= A6 (Sydney) =

Arterial road through Sydney, Australia

A6 (numerous constituent roads) New South Wales

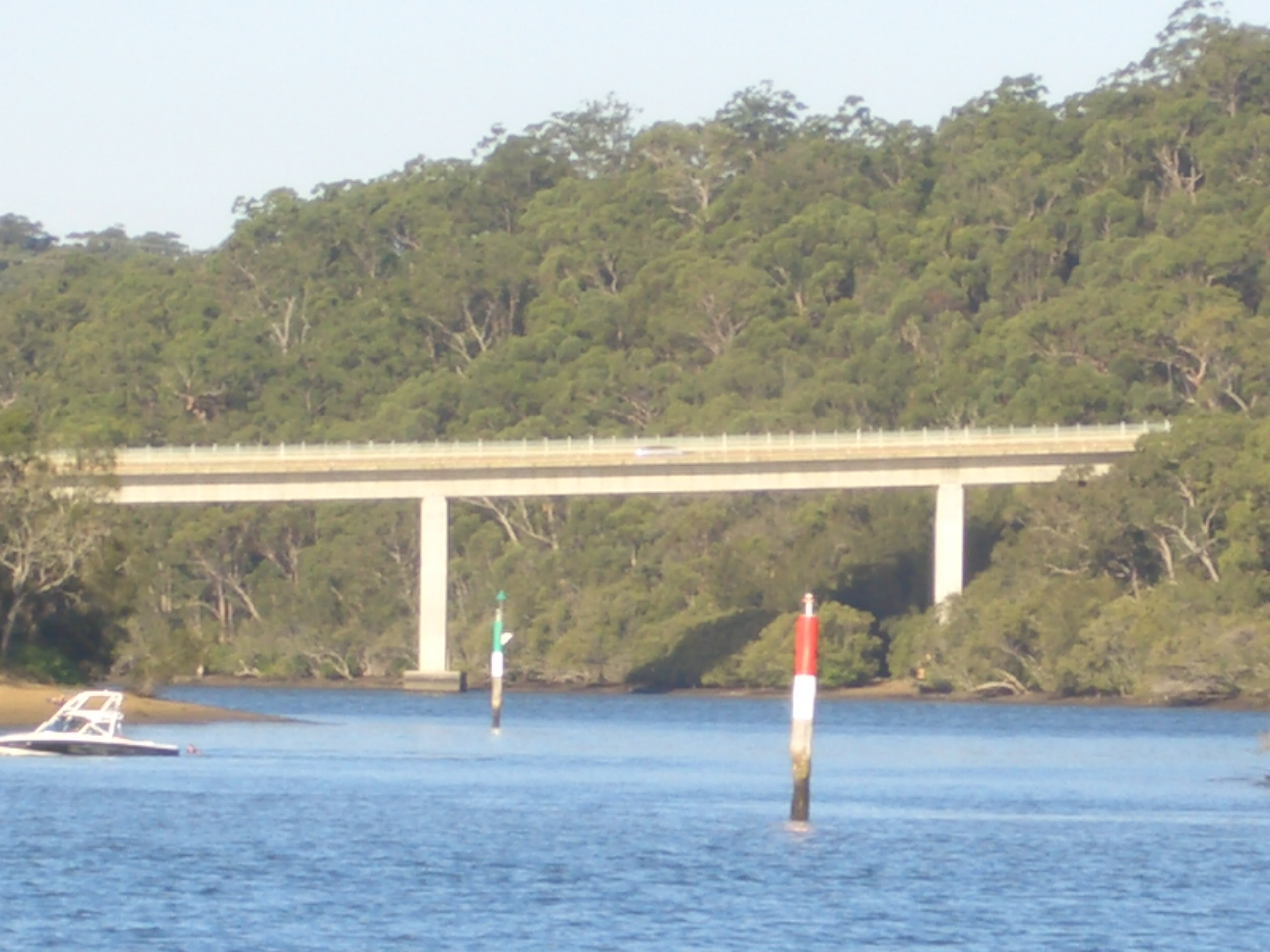
- Alfords Point Bridge
- Location in metropolitan Sydney
- Coordinates: 33.779626°S 151.052286°E (North end); 34.079481°S 151.010720°E (South end)

General information
- Type: Road
- Length: 40.8 km (25 mi)
- Gazetted: August 1928
- Route number(s): A6 (2013–present)
- Former route number: Metroad 6 (1999–2013); State Route 45 (1974–1999)

Major junctions
- North end: Cumberland Highway; Carlingford, Sydney
- Victoria Road; Western Motorway; Parramatta Road; Hume Highway; Canterbury Road; South Western Motorway; Henry Lawson Drive; Bangor Bypass
- South end: Princes Highway; Heathcote, Sydney

Location(s)
- Major suburbs: Eastwood, Ermington, Silverwater, Auburn, Lidcombe, Chullora, Bankstown, Alfords Point, Menai, Barden Ridge, Lucas Heights

Highway system
- Highways in Australia; National Highway • Freeways in Australia; Highways in New South Wales

The A6 is a route designation of a major metropolitan arterial route through suburban Sydney, linking Cumberland Highway at Carlingford and Princes Highway at Heathcote, via Lidcombe and Bankstown. This name covers a few consecutive roads and is widely known to most drivers, but the entire allocation is also known – and signposted – by the names of its constituent parts: Marsden Road, Stewart Street, Kissing Point Road, Silverwater Road, St Hilliers Road, Boorea Street, Olympic Drive, Joseph Street, Rookwood Road, Stacey Street, Fairford Road, Davies Road, Alfords Point Road, New Illawarra Road and Heathcote Road.

== Route ==
The A6 commences at the intersection of Cumberland Highway at Carlingford and heads in a southerly direction as Marsden Road as a two-lane, single carriageway road, before changing name to Stewart Street at Dundas Valley and heading west, widening to a four-lane, dual-carriageway road. It intersects with and changes name to Kissing Point Road, and then nearly immediately changing name again to Silverwater Road at Dundas and heads south, crossing over Victoria Road at an interchange in Ermington, crossing Parramatta River over Silverwater Bridge and widening to a six-lane, dual-carriageway just south of the river in Silverwater, meeting M4 Motorway at Auburn and then Great Western Highway shortly afterwards. It changes name to St Hilliers Road and continues southwest, then along Boorea Street heading east, then changes name again to Olympic Drive shortly afterwards and heads in a southerly direction to Lidcombe, changing name again to Joseph Street and Rookwood Road through Potts Hill, before changing name again to Stacey Street and narrowing to a four-lane, dual-carriageway road just before it meets Hume Highway at Chullora. It continues south, changing name to Fairford Road at Punchbowl, crossing over Canterbury Road at an interchange and then meeting M5 South Western Motorway shortly afterwards at Padstow, widening to a six-lane, dual-carriageway road. It changes name to Davies Road soon after, then again to Alfords Point Road at Padstow Heights, and crosses Georges River, narrowing to a four-lane, single-carriageway road at Alfords Point, and meets Old Illawarra Road at Menai, changing name to New Illawarra Road. It intersects with and changes name for the final time to Heathcote Road at Lucas Heights, before eventually terminating at the intersection with Princes Highway at Heathcote.

== History ==
The passing of the Main Roads Act of 1924 through the Parliament of New South Wales provided for the declaration of Main Roads, roads partially funded by the State government through the Main Roads Board (later the Department of Main Roads, and eventually Transport for NSW). Main Road no. 158 was declared from Kissing Point Road (today Victoria Road) in Ermington along Marsden Road to the intersection with Pennant Hills Road in Carlingford, and Main Road No. 190 was declared from the intersection with Great Western Highway in Lidcombe, via John Street, Church Street, Railway Parade, East Street, Victoria Street and Rookwood Road to the intersection with Hume Highway at Bankstown, on the same day, 8 August 1928; with the passing of the Main Roads (Amendment) Act of 1929 to provide for additional declarations of State Highways and Trunk Roads, these was amended to Main Roads 158 and 190 on 8 April 1929. Main Road 512 was declared along Heathcote Road on 15 November 1939, between Lucas Heights and Princes Highway at Heathcote (and continuing northwest to Hume Highway at Liverpool).

The Department of Main Roads constructed a number of defense routes during World War II, including Heathcote Road and a new road (called New Illawarra Road) between Lucas Heights and Heathcote Road, bypassing the causeway crossing of the Woronora River at The Needles; these projects were completed during 1941.

Main Road 532 was declared on 25 June 1947 along Sutherland Street, between its intersection with Great Western Highway at Auburn and the Parramatta River. Main Road 532A was declared on 4 May 1949 along Spurway Street, between Kissing Point Road in Dundas and Marsden Road in Dundas; this was replaced by Main Road 574 (and continuing west along Kissing Point Road to its intersection with Victoria Road in Parramatta) on 1 October 1951.

Spurway Street (part of Main Road 574) was later renamed Stewart Street, and Sutherland Street (Main Road 532) was later renamed Silverwater Road, on the same day, 6 August 1952; Main Road 512 was later renamed Heathcote Road (across its entire length between Liverpool and Heathcote), on 27 July 1955.

The road project to bypass Lidcombe station to the west and connect to Bridge Street was completed in 1955 (with Main Road 190 deviating from John Street along Childs Street and the new Bridge Street alignment under the railway lines on 23 March 1955, and its southern end also extended along Chapel Road to meet Canterbury Road at Bankstown at the same time), with the route realigned again to reach Great Western Highway via Olympic Drive and St Hilliers Road instead on 2 May 1962. When the Silverwater Bridge over the Parramatta River was completed in 1962, the northern end of Main Road 532 was extended to cross the bridge to reach the intersection with Victoria Road in Ermington on 22 February 1967. A new bridge over the railway line east of Bankstown connecting both halves of Stacey Street was completed in 1970, and the completion of Alfords Point Bridge over the Georges River in 1973 extended the route further south from Padstow to Lucas Heights.

The route underwent further realignments: the Lidcombe bypass, connecting a new alignment from Victoria Street to Olympic Drive where it met at Bridge Street, opened in 1982. The northern end of Main Road 190 was extended northwards (from the intersection with Great Western Highway in Auburn along Silverwater Road via Ermington to the intersection with Kissing Point Road at Dundas – the last section still under construction at the time - subsuming Main Road 532) and re-aligned southwards (from Rookwood and Chapel Roads to Canterbury Road at Bankstown, to Rookwood Road via Hume Highway along Stacey Street and Fairford and Davies Roads to Henry Lawson Drive at Padstow Heights), on 15 February 1991, then extended south again along Alfords Point Road and New and Old Illawarra Roads to Heathcote Road at Lucas Heights, on 22 January 1993.

The Silverwater Road extension from Ermington to Dundas opened in 1996, allowing through traffic along Stewart Street and Marsden Road to Cumberland Highway in Carlingford. In 1999 Stacey Street was extended north to directly connect with Rookwood Road at Chullora, bypassing the dog-leg via Hume Highway between these two roads.

The passing of the Roads Act of 1993 updated road classifications and the way they could be declared within New South Wales. Under this act, the A6 retains its declaration as Main Road 190 (from Dundas to Lucas Heights), and part of Main Roads 158 (Marsden Road), 512 (Heathcote Road), and 574 (Stewart Street and Kissing Point Road).

The route was allocated State Route 45 in 1974, from Victoria Road in Ermington to Princes Highway in Heathcote, extended to Carlingford when the Silverwater extension opened in 1996. It was replaced in its entirely by Metroad 6 in January 1999. When Metroad 7 along Cumberland Highway was replaced by Westlink M7 on its opening in December 2005, Metroad 6 was extended northwards along Pennant Hills Road to the interchange with M2 Hills Motorway. Metroad 6 was realigned between Menai and Barden Ridge, from Old Illawarra Road onto New Illawarra Road, completed between 2005–11 as part of the Bangor Bypass project. With the conversion to the newer alphanumeric system in 2013, Metroad 6 was replaced by route A6, with the previous extension along Pennant Hills Road truncated back to Carlingford.

== Future ==
In 2019, the New South Wales Government announced it would rename the northern extension of the Princes Motorway, between Arncliffe and Kogarah (due to open in 2027 or 2028) to the "M6 Motorway". No announcement has yet been made on whether the A6 will be renumbered to avoid duplicate numbers.

== Major intersections ==
| LGA | Location | km | mi | Destinations | Notes |
|---|---|---|---|---|---|
| Parramatta | Carlingford | 0.0 | 0.0 | Pennant Hills Road (Cumberland Highway) (A28) – Liverpool, Parramatta, Pennant Hills, Wahroonga | Northern terminus of route A6; Northern end of Marsden Road |
| Parramatta | Dundas Valley–Eastwood–Ermington tripoint | 2.5 | 1.6 | Marsden Road (south) – Melrose Park; Rutledge Street (east) – Eastwood | Southern end of Marsden Road; Eastern end of Stewart Street |
| Parramatta | Dundas Valley–Dundas–Ermington tripoint | 3.3 | 2.1 | Kissing Point Road (south) – Ermington | Western end of Stewart Street; Eastern end of Kissing Point Road |
| Parramatta | Dundas Valley–Dundas boundary | 3.5 | 2.2 | Kissing Point Road (west) – North Parramatta | Western end of Kissing Point Road; Northern end of Silverwater Road |
| Parramatta | Ermington–Rydalmere boundary | 5.1 | 3.2 | Victoria Road (A40) – Parramatta, Gladesville, Rozelle | |
| Parramatta River | | 6.3 | 3.9 | Silverwater Bridge | |
| Parramatta | Silverwater | 8.5 | 5.3 | Western Motorway (M4) – Penrith, Parramatta, Ashfield | |
| Parramatta–Cumberland boundary | Silverwater–Auburn–Lidcombe tripoint | 8.8 | 5.5 | Great Western Highway – Penrith, Parramatta, Haymarket | Southern end of Silverwater Road; Northern end of St Hilliers Road |
| Cumberland | Auburn | 9.6 | 6.0 | Rawson Street (west) – Auburn; St Hilliers Road (south) – Auburn | Southern end of St Hilliers Road; Western end of Boorea Street |
| Cumberland | Lidcombe | 10.0 | 6.2 | Boorea Street (east) – Lidcombe | Eastern end of Boorea Street; Northern end of Olympic Drive |
| Cumberland | Lidcombe | 11.0 | 6.8 | Main Suburban railway line | |
| Cumberland | Lidcombe | | | Joseph Street (north) – Lidcombe | Southern end of Olympic Drive; Northern end of Joseph Street |
| Cumberland | Lidcombe | 11.9 | 7.4 | Flemington–Campsie Goods Line | |
| Cumberland | Lidcombe | 13.9 | 8.6 | Lewis Street – Lidcombe | Southern end of Joseph Street; Northern end of Rookwood Road |
| Canterbury-Bankstown | Yagoona | 15.6 | 9.7 | Rookwood Road (south) – Yagoona | Southern end of Rookwood Road; Northern end of Stacey Street |
| Canterbury-Bankstown | Greenacre–Bankstown boundary | 16.1 | 10.0 | Hume Highway (A22) – Prestons, Liverpool, Ashfield | |
| Canterbury-Bankstown | Greenacre–Bankstown boundary | 17.4 | 10.8 | Bankstown railway line | |
| Canterbury-Bankstown | Bankstown–Punchbowl boundary | 18.3 | 11.4 | Macauley Avenue – Bankstown | Southern end of Stacey Street; Northern end of Fairford Road |
| Canterbury-Bankstown | Bankstown | 19.4 | 12.1 | Canterbury Road (A34) – Liverpool, Punchbowl, Canterbury | |
| Canterbury-Bankstown | Padstow | 20.1 | 12.5 | South Western Motorway (M5) – Prestons, Liverpool, Sydney Airport | |
| Canterbury-Bankstown | Padstow | 20.6 | 12.8 | Watson Road – Padstow | Southern end of Fairford Road; Northern end of Davies Road |
| Canterbury-Bankstown | Padstow | 21.4 | 13.3 | East Hills railway line | |
| Canterbury-Bankstown | Padstow | 22.6 | 14.0 | Alma Road – Padstow | Southern end of Davies Road; Northern end of Alfords Point Road |
| Canterbury-Bankstown | Padstow Heights | 23.2 | 14.4 | Clancy Drive, to Henry Lawson Drive – Milperra, Peakhurst | No right turn from southbound exit, no right turn into southbound entrance |
| Canterbury-Bankstown | Padstow Heights | 23.5 | 14.6 | Henry Lawson Drive – Padstow Heights | Southbound entrance only |
| Georges River | | 24.5 | 15.2 | Alfords Point Bridge | |
| Sutherland | Alfords Point | 26.7 | 16.6 | Brushwood Drive (north) – Alfords Point; Fowler Road (east) – Illawong; Old Illawarra Road (south) – Menai | Northbound entrance and southbound exit only |
| Sutherland | Menai | 27.7 | 17.2 | Old Illawarra Road – Menai | Southbound entrance only |
| Sutherland | Menai | 29.1 | 18.1 | Old Illawarra Road, to Menai Road – Illawong, Bangor | Southern end of Alfords Point Road; Northern end of New Illawarra Road |
| Sutherland | Menai | 30.3 | 18.8 | Bangor Bypass – Bangor, Sutherland | |
| Sutherland | Lucas Heights–Holsworthy boundary | 35.4 | 22.0 | Heathcote Road (west) – Moorebank, Liverpool | Southern end of New Illawarra Road; Western end of Heathcote Road |
| Woronora River | | 38.2 | 23.7 | Heathcote Road Bridge | |
| Sutherland | Heathcote–Engadine boundary | 40.8 | 25.4 | Princes Highway (A1) – Newtown, Sutherland, Wollongong | Southern terminus of route A6; Eastern end of Heathcote Road |
Incomplete access; Tolled; Route transition
