= Bangor Bypass =

Road in New South Wales

Bangor Bypass New South Wales
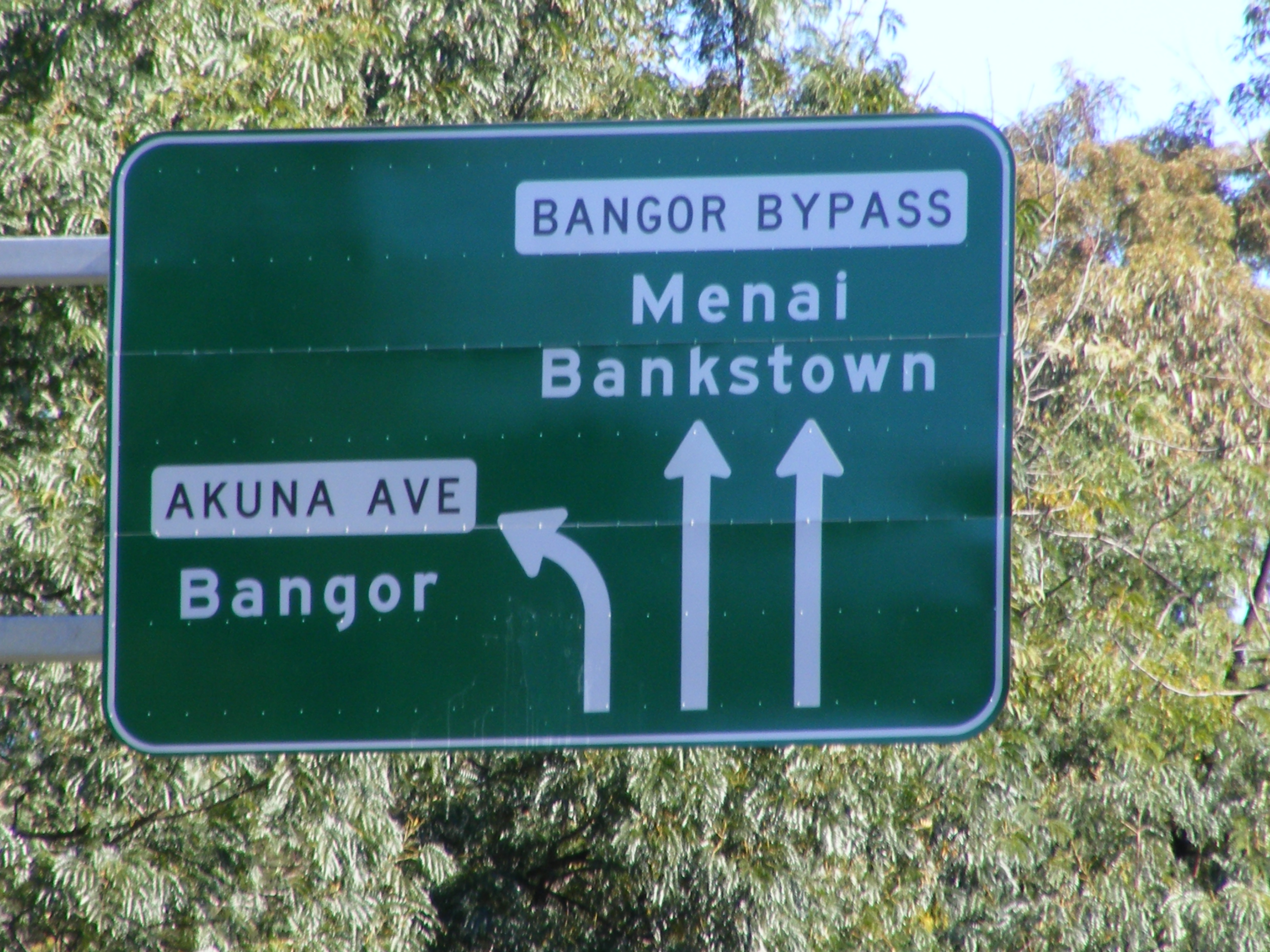
- Road sign at the eastern end of Bangor Bypass
- Location in metropolitan Sydney
- Coordinates: 34.023469°S 151.007800°E (West end); 34.022237°S 151.039337°E (East end)

General information
- Type: Road
- Length: 2.8 km (1.7 mi)
- Opened: February 2005
- Gazetted: February 2009

Major junctions
- West end: New Illawarra Road; Menai, Sydney
- Akuna Avenue
- East end: River Road; Bangor, Sydney

Location(s)
- Major suburbs: Bangor

Interactive Map

Bangor Bypass is a road in New South Wales, Australia, between New Illawarra Road (A6) and River Road, bypassing Bangor and Menai. Completed in February 2005, it replaced Menai Road as the main road between A6 and River Road, alleviating traffic on Menai Road and increasing travel speed through Bangor and Menai. It also acts as a western extension of River Road and Woronora Bridge, which was completed four years earlier in 2001. A section of New Illawarra Road north of the bypass was also completed as part of the project, linking the bypass directly to Alfords Point Road.

== Route ==
Bangor Bypass commences at the intersection with New Illawarra Road in Menai and heads east as a four-lane, dual-carriageway road, immediately crossing over Old Illarawrra Road by bridge, and continues through the forests flanking Woronora River until eventually terminating at the interchange with River Road and Akuna Avenue in Bangor.

== History ==
The bypass project had been planned many years earlier. During the years of planning a misunderstanding by residential developers led to new roads and housing being constructed on Roads & Traffic Authority land at the end of Anzac Road in Bangor. This caused the proposed position of the bypass to shift slightly north

Preparations for the Bangor Bypass included changing traffic flow between Bangor, Woronora and Sutherland. This was largely due to a stretch of road known as the "Woronora bends", a collection of steep hairpin bends along Menai Road. In June 1990, a changeover from the bends shifted traffic from Menai Road onto a small stretch of Akuna Avenue and a new road called River Road. In 2001, traffic was shifted onto an extended River Road via the new Woronora River Bridge, replacing Menai Road via the older Woronora Bridge. Construction on stage 1 of the Bangor Bypass was commenced by Abigroup in June 2003 with it opening in February 2005.

Stage 2 of the bypass project, commenced in 2009 and completed in early 2011, extended the Stage 1 New Illawarra Road southwards and joined it with the rest of New Illawarra Road at Barden Ridge, allowing the then Metroad 6 (now A6) to bypass Old Illawarra Road.

The passing of the Main Roads Act of 1924 through the Parliament of New South Wales provided for the declaration of Main Roads, roads partially funded by the State government through the Main Roads Board (MRB). With the subsequent passing of the Main Roads (Amendment) Act of 1929 to provide for additional declarations of State Highways and Trunk Roads, the Department of Main Roads (having succeeded the MRB in 1932) re-aligned the western end of Main Road 663 (originally declared from the intersection of Princes Highway and Old Princes Highway at Sutherland and along The Grand Parade, Linden Street, River and Menai Roads to the intersection with Old Illawarra Road in Menai on 22 January 1993) along River Road and Bangor Bypass to the intersection with New Illarwarra Road, on 20 February 2009.

The passing of the Roads Act of 1993 updated road classifications and the way they could be declared within New South Wales. Under this act, Bangor Bypass retains its declaration as part of Main Road 663.

== Exits and interchanges ==
Bangor Bypass is entirely contained within the Sutherland Shire local government area.

Location	km	mi	Destinations	Notes
Menai	0.0	0.0	New Illawarra Road – Carlingford, Silverwater, Lucas Heights	Western terminus of road
Menai	0.2	0.12	Barden Road – Barden Ridge to Old Illawarra Road – Illawong, Barden Ridge	Westbound entrance and exit only
Bangor	2.8	1.7	Akuna Avenue, to Menai Road – Bangor	Eastbound entrance and westbound exit only
Bangor	2.8	1.7	River Road – Sutherland	Eastern termius of road, continues east as River Road
1.000 mi = 1.609 km; 1.000 km = 0.621 mi: Incomplete access; Route transition
