= Heathcote Road =

Road in Sydney, Australia

Heathcote Road New South Wales
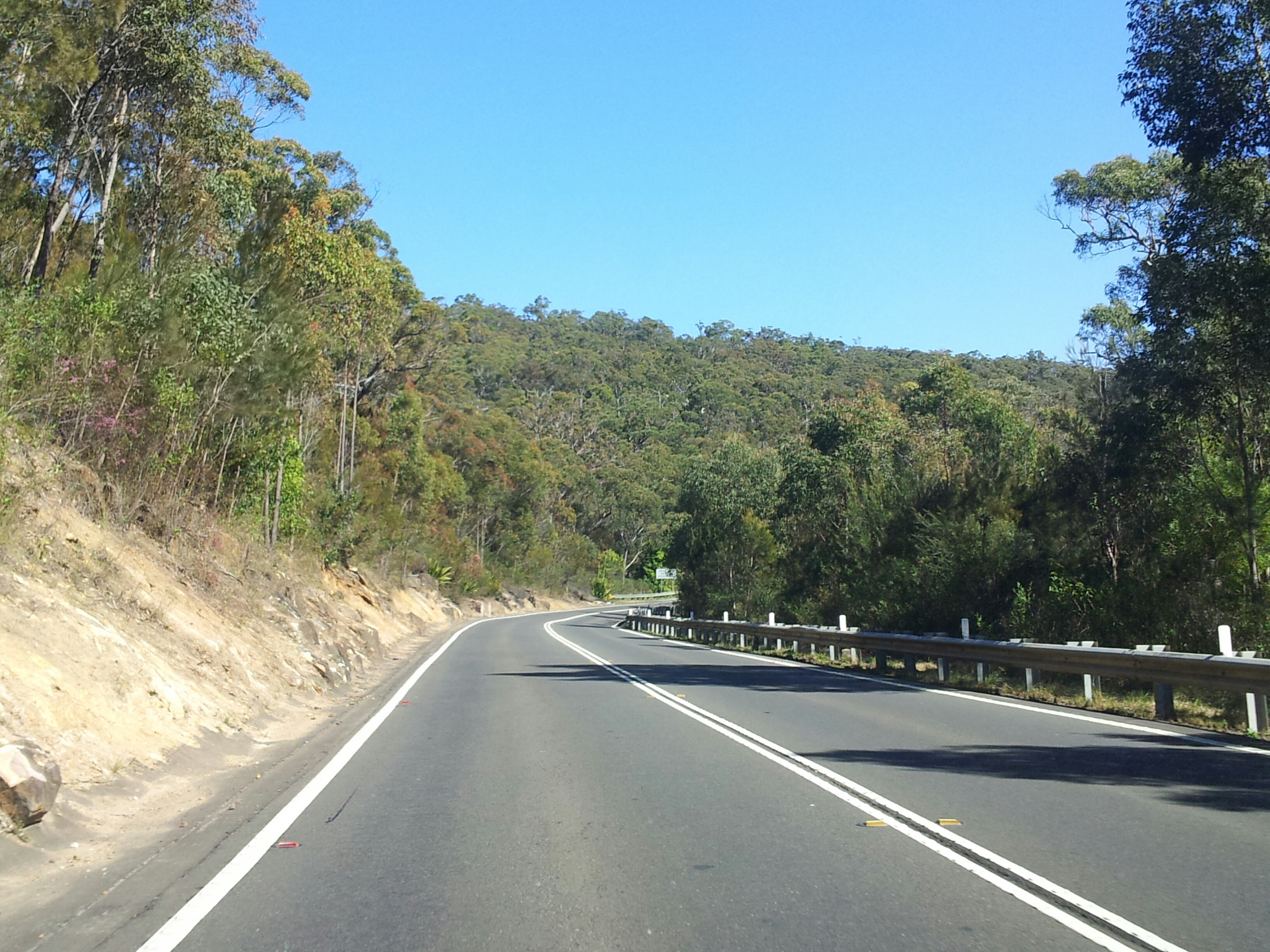
- The road as it passes through Lucas Heights
- Coordinates: 33.928201°S 150.931161°E (North end); 34.079477°S 151.010722°E (South end)

General information
- Type: Road
- Length: 23.9 km (15 mi)
- Gazetted: November 1939
- Route number(s): A6 (2013–present) (Lucas Heights–Heathcote)
- Former route number: Metroad 7 (1993–1999) State Route 61 (1974–1993) Entire route; Metroad 6 (1999–2013) (Lucas Heights–Heathcote)

Major junctions
- North end: Newbridge Road; Moorebank, Sydney
- South Western Motorway
- South end: Princes Highway; Heathcote, Sydney

Location(s)
- Major suburbs: Holsworthy, Lucas Heights

Heathcote Road is a 24-kilometre-long (15 mi) major arterial road in the south of Sydney, Australia. It plays a major role in the servicing of traffic travelling between the Illawarra and Western Sydney, and its eastern end is a constituent part of the A6 route.

== Route ==
Heathcote Road commences at the intersection of Newbridge Road in Moorebank, just east of Liverpool, and heads in a southeasterly direction as a four-lane, single carriageway road, meeting M5 South Western Motorway shortly afterwards. Still heading southeast, it enters the more rural areas of southern Sydney, past the Holsworthy Barracks in the northern borders of Heathcote National Park in Holsworthy. It intersects New Illawarra Road at Lucas Heights, with the Lucas Heights Resource Recovery Park bordering its northern side, before terminating at its junction with the Princes Highway in Heathcote.

As its name suggests, the road is generally surrounded by heath, but more often dry eucalyptus woodlands and shrublands with some mallee vegetation.

The road has a history of accidents, due to its narrow nature, the number of blind corners and the steep gradients.

== History ==
Heathcote Road was constructed during World War II as a military defence route and a way to bypass the old Illawarra Road which used the ridge lines and a causeway crossing of the Woronora River between Menai and Engadine. Construction began in 1940 and was completed in 1943, although the route, or at least sections of it, existed in some form prior to 1940.

The passing of the Main Roads Act of 1924 through the Parliament of New South Wales provided for the declaration of Main Roads, roads partially funded by the State government through the Main Roads Board (MRB, later Transport for NSW). With the subsequent passing of the Main Roads (Amendment) Act of 1929 to provide for additional declarations of State Highways and Trunk Roads, the Department of Main Roads (having succeeded the MRB in 1932) declared Main Road 512 along the route on 15 November 1939, between Hume Highway in Liverpool and Princes Highway in Heathcote, in preparation of the route's reconstruction starting the following year.

The route was officially re-named Heathcote Road, between Terminus Street in Liverpool and Pacific Highway at Heathcote, on 27 July 1955. The opening of the new bridge over Georges River (now known as the Light Horse Bridge) in 1958 had the western end of Heathcote Road truncated to meet the new road over the bridge (now Newbridge Road) in Moorebank instead.

The passing of the Roads Act of 1993 updated road classifications and the way they could be declared within New South Wales. Under this act, Heathcote Road retains its declaration as part of Main Road 512.

The route was allocated State Route 61 in 1974, then re-designated part of Metroad 7 in April 1993. This was completed removed in 1999, with just the eastern end between Lucas Heights and Heathcote re-designated as part of Metroad 6 in its place. With the conversion to the newer alphanumeric system in 2013, Metroad 6 was replaced by route A6.

== Major intersections ==
LGA	Location	km	mi	Destinations	Notes
Liverpool	Moorebank	0.0	0.0	Newbridge Road (A34) – Liverpool, Punchbowl, Canterbury	Northern terminus of road
Liverpool	Moorebank	0.1	0.062	Moorebank Avenue – Glenfield	
Liverpool	Moorebank–Wattle Grove–Hammondville tripoint	1.9	1.2	South Western Motorway (M5) – Prestons, Liverpool, Sydney Airport	No right turn southbound onto westbound entrance ramp
Liverpool	Holsworthy	4.9	3.0	East Hills railway line	
Sutherland	Lucas Heights–Holsworthy boundary	18.5	11.5	New Illawarra Road (A6) – Alfords Point, Lidcombe, Carlingford	Route A6 continues north along New Illawarra Road
Woronora River		21.3	13.2	Heathcote Road Bridge	
Sutherland	Heathcote–Engadine boundary	23.9	14.9	Princes Highway (A1) – Newtown, Sutherland, Wollongong	Southern terminus of road and route A6
Tolled; Route transition
