= List of bridges in Sydney =

This is a list of major bridges in Sydney, New South Wales, Australia.

== Road bridges ==
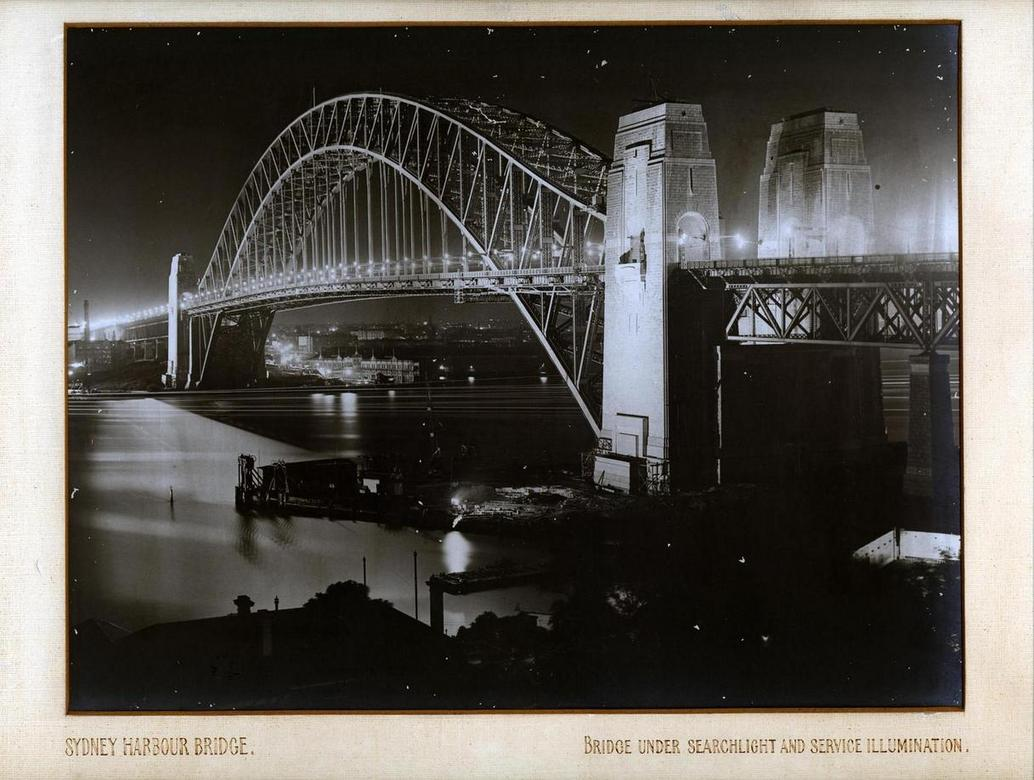
The Sydney Harbour Bridge, completed in 1932

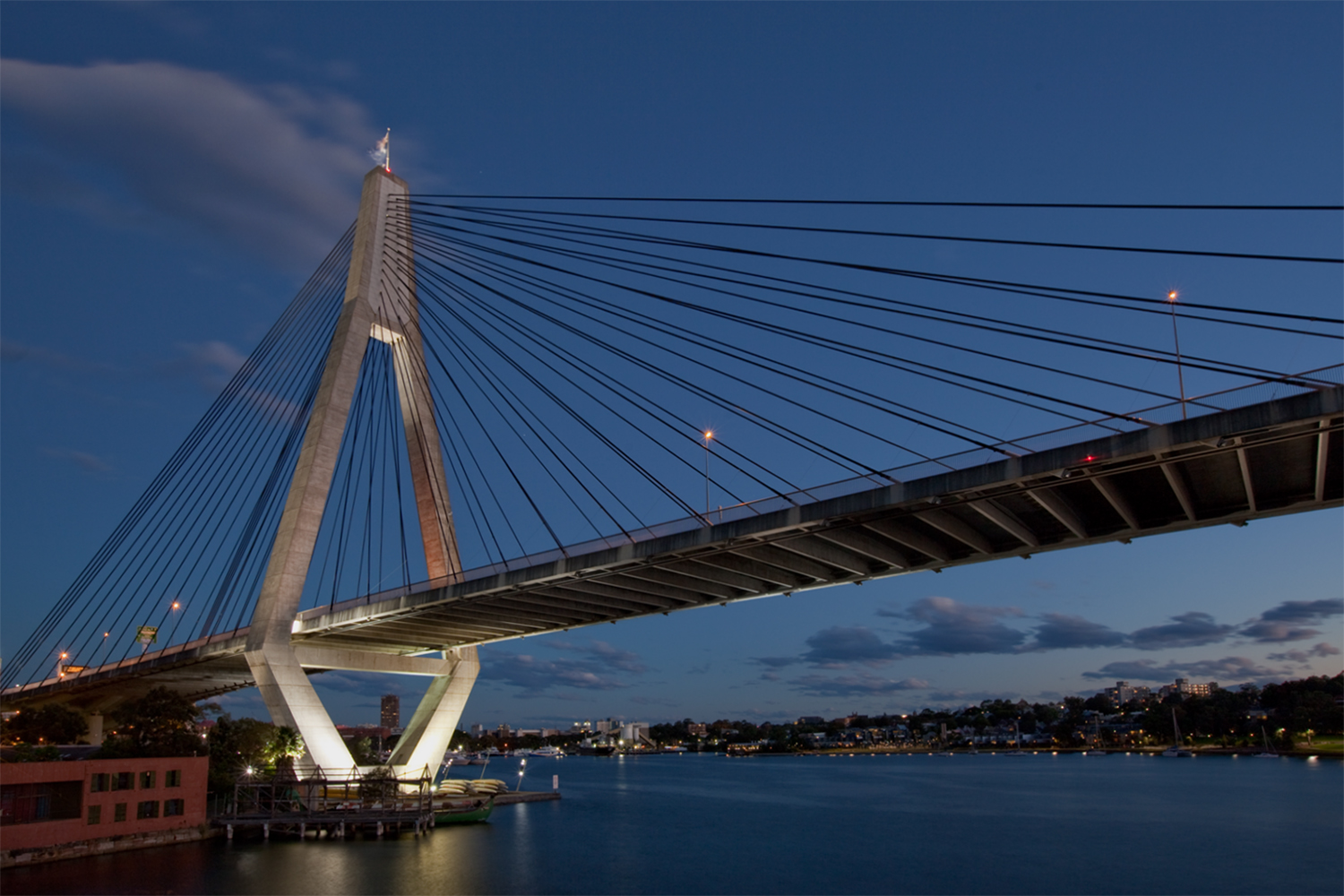
Anzac Bridge, completed in 1995

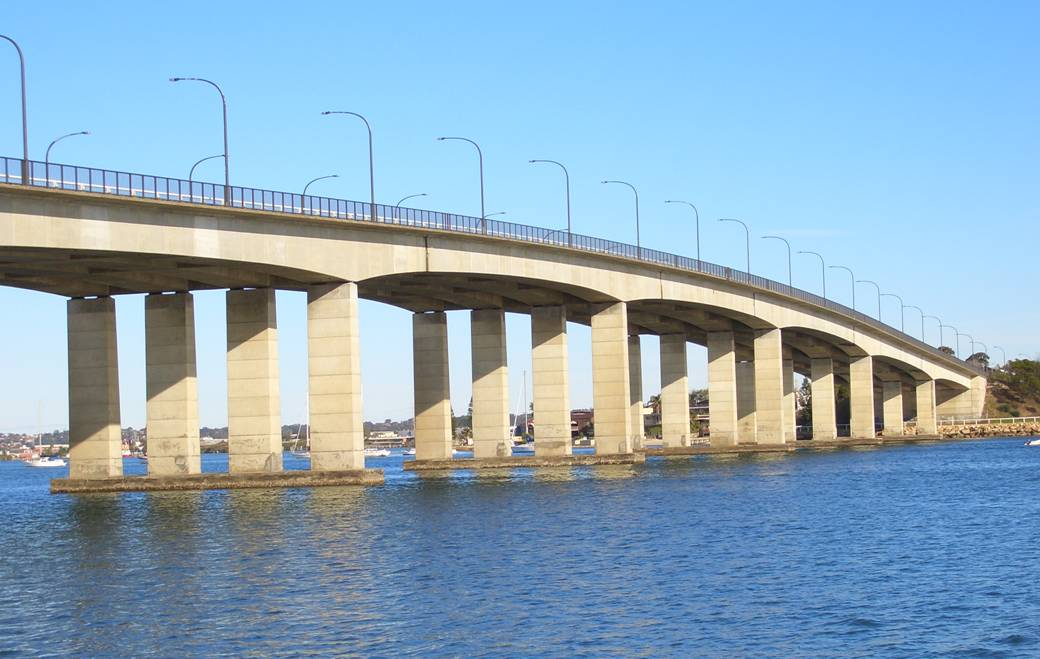
Captain Cook Bridge

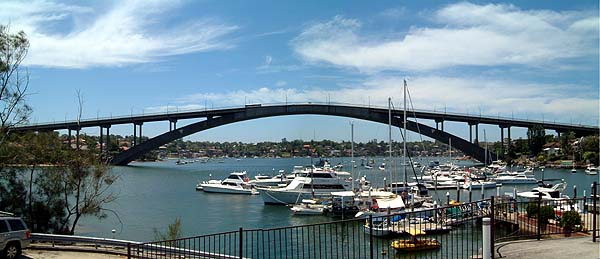
Gladesville Bridge

- Alfords Point
- Anzac
- Bennelong (private vehicles not permitted)
- Bernie Banton
- Captain Cook
- De Burghs
- Endeavour
- Epping Road
- Fig Tree
- Fullers
- Gasworks Bridge
- Gladesville
- Glebe Island
- Iron Cove
- James Ruse Drive
- Lansdowne
- Lennox
- Long Gully Bridge
- Peats Ferry Bridge
- Richmond Bridge
- Roseville
- Ryde
- Silverwater
- Spit
- Sydney Harbour
- Tarban Creek
- Tom Uglys
- Victoria Bridge, Penrith
- Victoria Bridge, Picton
- Windsor
- Woronora

== Railway bridges ==
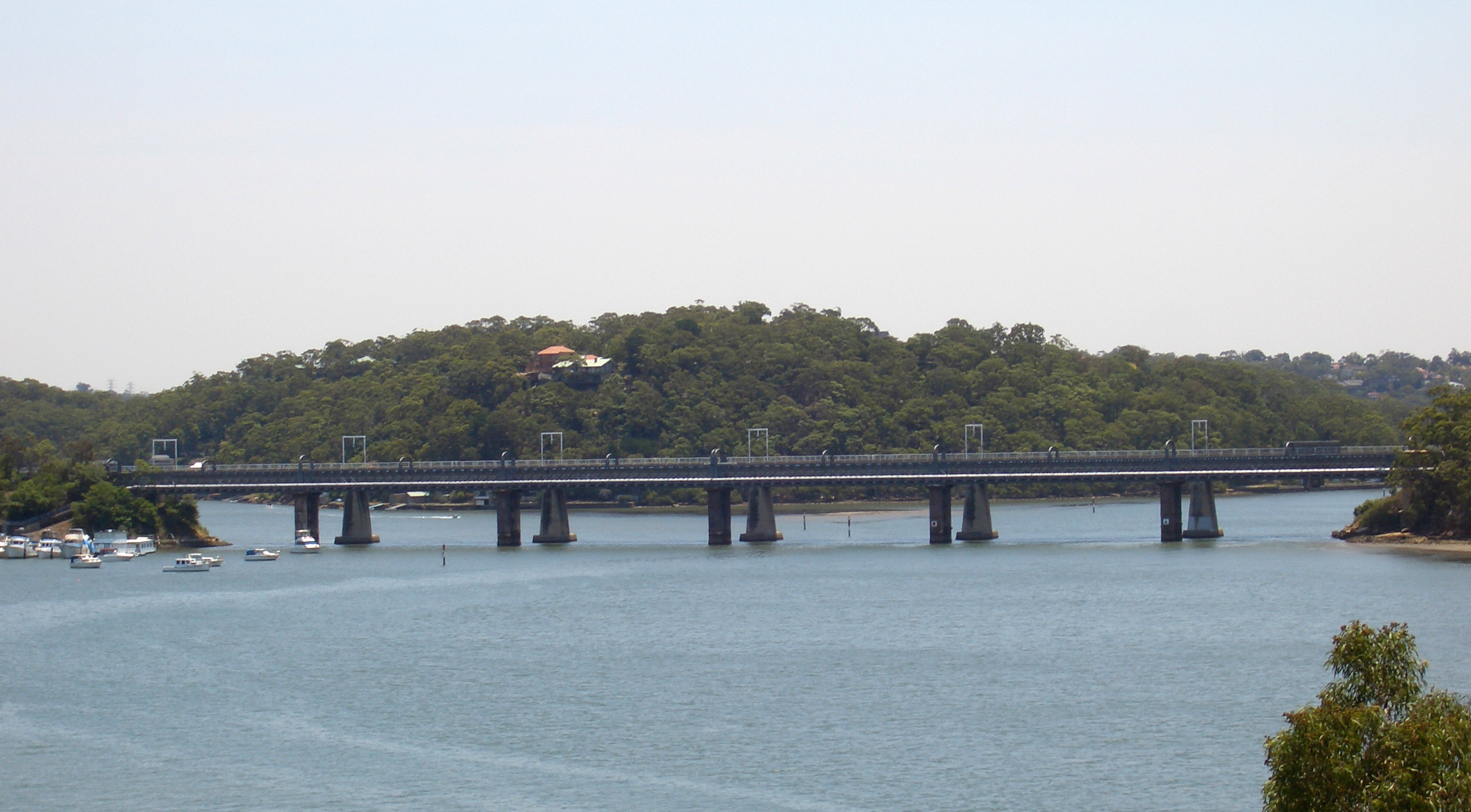
Como railway bridge in 2006

- Clyde-Carlingford
- Como
- Glebe Viaduct
- Hawkesbury River
- Jubilee Park Viaduct
- Knapsack Gully viaduct
- John Whitton
- Holsworthy rail
- Wentworth Park Viaduct
- Rouse Hill Sydney Metro northwest bridge

== Pedestrian bridges ==
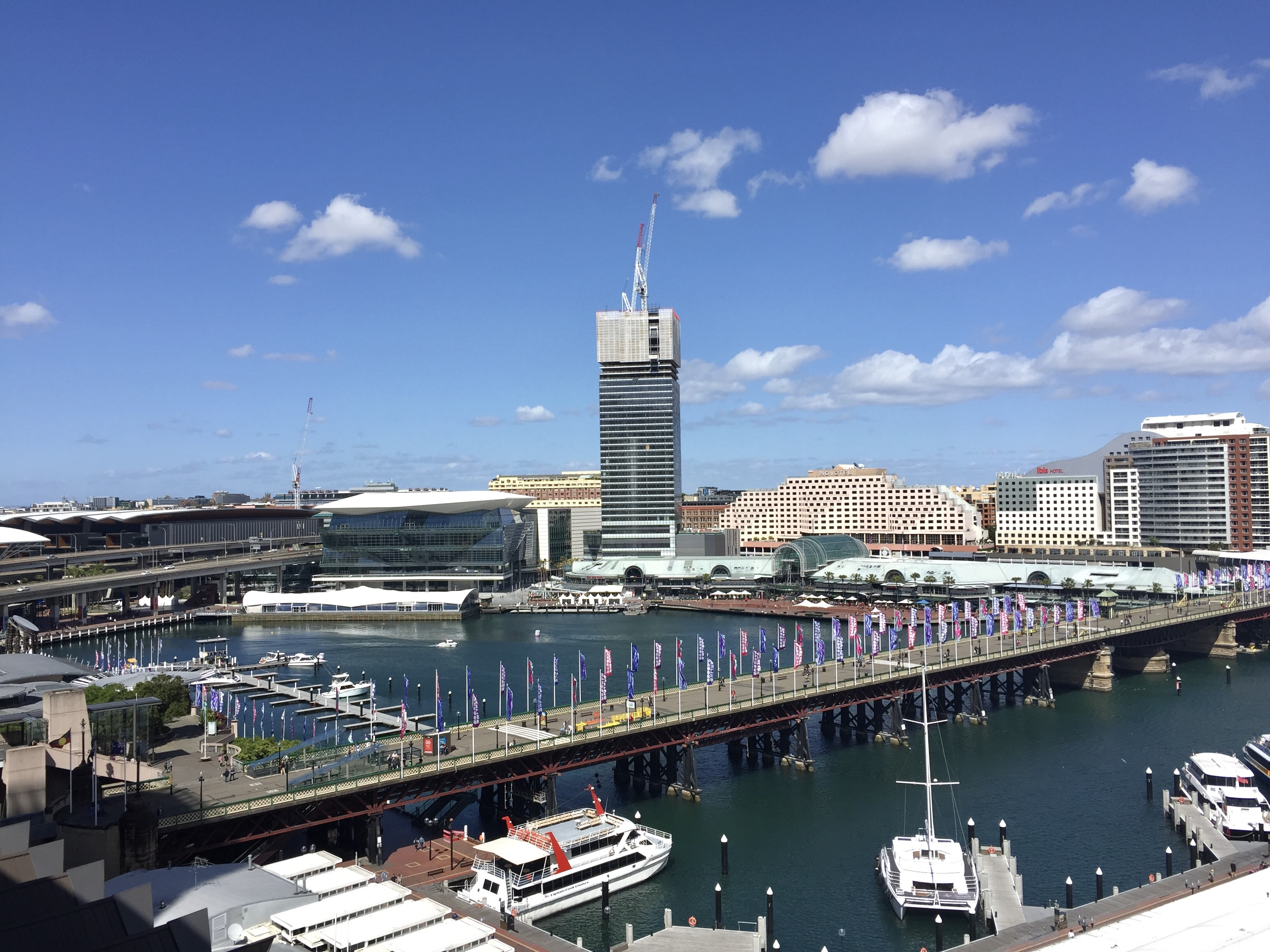
Pyrmont Bridge in 2016

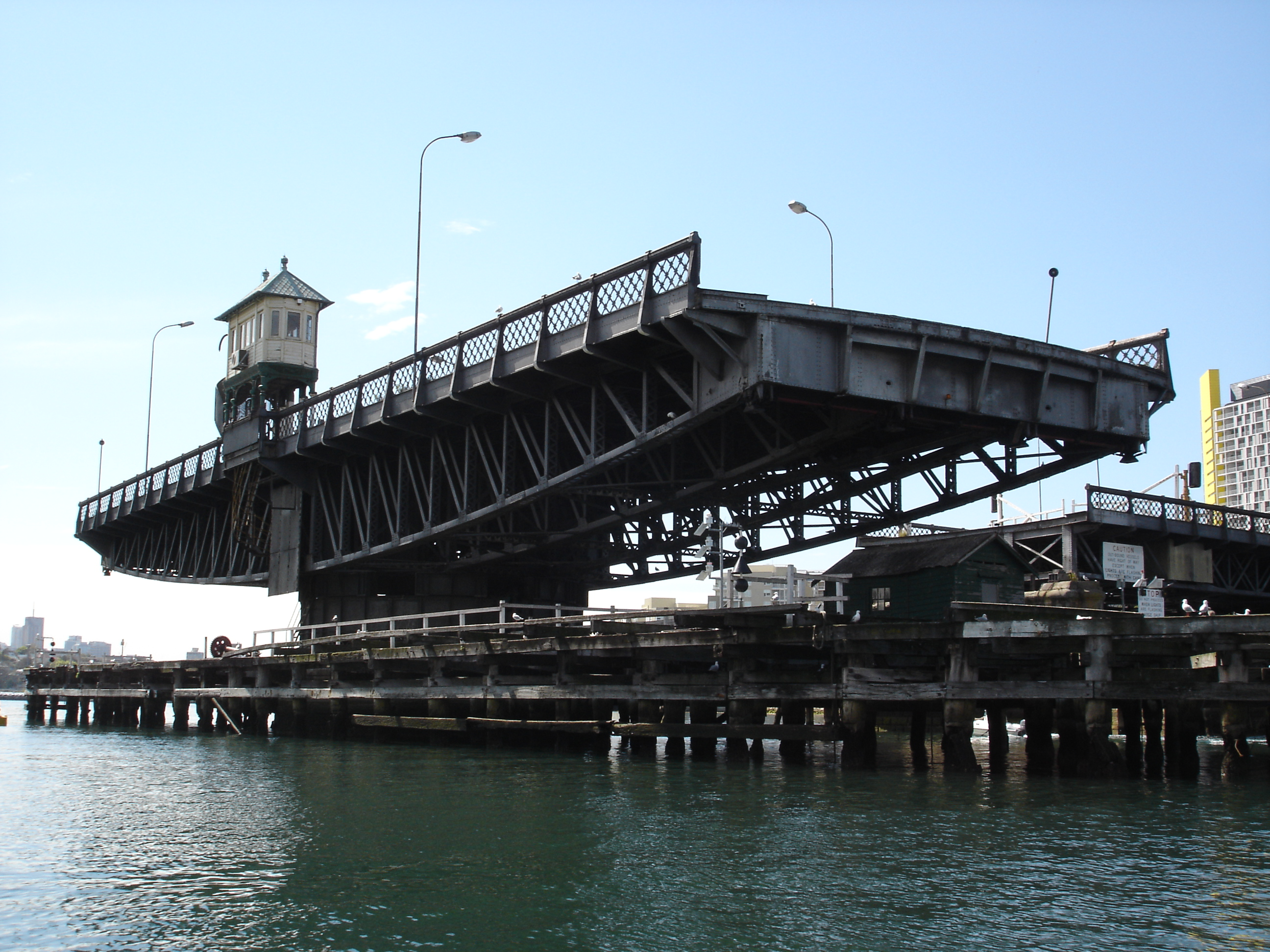
Glebe Island Bridge in 2006

- Albert Cotter
- Arncliffe
- Balgowlah
- Boothtown Aqueduct
- Clifford Love Bridge
- Elizabeth Street (Parramatta)
- Fairfield West
- Huntleys Point
- Kogarah
- Macquarie Culvert
- Meadowbank
- Mount Annan
- Old Como
- Pyrmont
- Rozelle
- Skye Winter (Claymore)
- Sydney University footbridge (Darlington)
- Sydney University footbridge (Forest Lodge)
- Woollahra

== Closed bridges ==
- Glebe Island

== See also ==
- Historic bridges of New South Wales
