= A34 (Sydney) =

Road in Sydney, Australia

A34 (numerous constituent roads) New South Wales

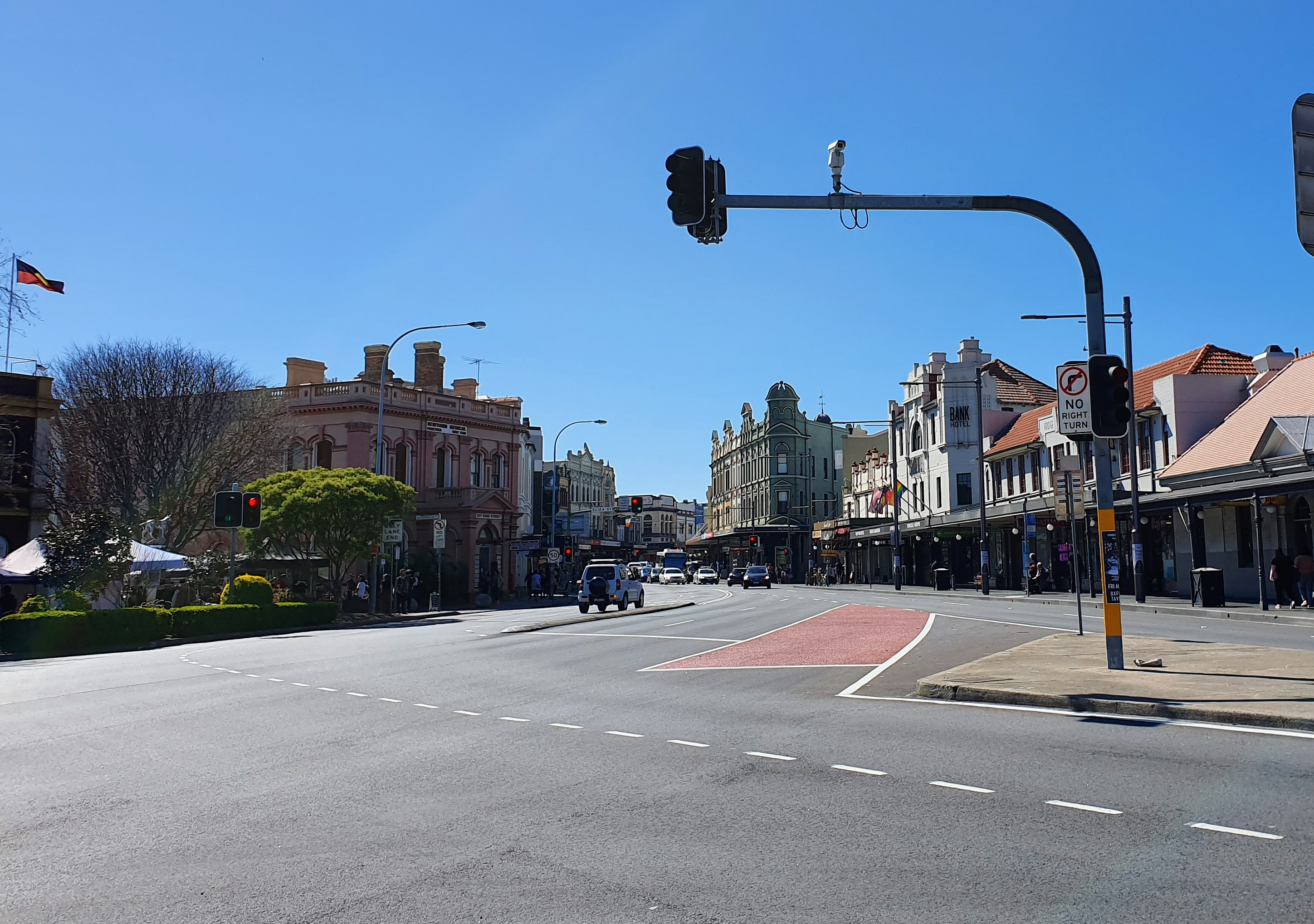
- Eastern end of A34 (Enmore Road) at Newtown
- Location in metropolitan Sydney
- Coordinates: 33.928628°S 150.917985°E (West end); 33.897738°S 151.178461°E (East end)

General information
- Type: Road
- Length: 26.2 km (16 mi)
- Gazetted: August 1928
- Route number(s): A34 (2013–present)
- Former route number: State Route 54 (1974–2013)

Major junctions
- West end: Hume Highway; Liverpool, Sydney
- Heathcote Road; Henry Lawson Drive; Fairford Road; King Georges Road; Old Canterbury Road
- East end: King Street; Newtown, Sydney

Location(s)
- Major suburbs: Milperra, Bankstown, Punchbowl, Lakemba, Canterbury, Dulwich Hill, Petersham, Enmore

Highway system
- Highways in Australia; National Highway • Freeways in Australia; Highways in New South Wales

The A34 is a route designation of a major metropolitan arterial route through suburban Sydney, linking Hume Highway at Liverpool and Princes Highway at Newtown, running parallel to the tolled M5 Motorway. This name covers a few consecutive roads and is widely known to most drivers, but the entire allocation is also known – and signposted – by the names of its constituent parts: Macquarie Street, Terminus Street, Newbridge Road, Milperra Road, (New) Canterbury Road, Stanmore Road and Enmore Road.

== Route ==
The A34 commences at the intersection with Hume Highway and Hoxton Park Road in Liverpool and heads in an easterly direction as Macquarie Street as a four-lane, single-carriageway road, turning into Terminus Street very shortly afterwards. It changes name to Newbridge Road and crosses the Georges River for the first time, intersecting with Heathcote Road shortly afterwards, and widening to a six-lane, dual-carriageway road. It continues east through Moorebank, crosses the Georges River again and meets Henry Lawson Drive at Milperra. It changes name to Milperra Road and continues in an easterly direction until it reaches The River Road in Revesby, where it changes name again to Canterbury Road, meeting King Georges Road at Roselands. At Hurlstone Park, the route splits off east to become New Canterbury Road. It changes name to Stanmore Road at the intersection of Crystal and Shaw Streets at Petersham, and intersecs with and changes name to Enmore Road at the intersection with Edgeware Road in Enmore, before eventually terminating at the intersection with King Street in Newtown.

== History ==
The passing of the Main Roads Act of 1924 through the Parliament of New South Wales provided for the declaration of Main Roads, roads partially funded by the State government through the Main Roads Board. Main Road No. 167 was declared on 8 August 1928, from the intersection with King Street in Newtown, along Enmore and Stanmore Roads, New Canterbury Road and Canterbury Road to the intersection with Chapel Road in Bankstown; with the passing of the Main Roads (Amendment) Act of 1929 to provide for additional declarations of State Highways and Trunk Roads, this was amended to Main Road 167 on 8 April 1929.

Main Road 512 was declared between Heathcote Road and Hume Highway in Liverpool on 15 November 1939 (and continuing southeast along Heathcote Road via Lucas Heights to Princes Highway at Heathcote); the western end of Main Road 167 was later extended along Milperra and Newbridge Roads to meet Main Road 512 (Heathcote Road) at Moorebank on 20 March 1940.

The passing of the Roads Act of 1993 updated road classifications and the way they could be declared within New South Wales. Under this act, the A34 retains its declaration as Main Road 167 (from Moorebank to Newtown), and part of Main Road 512 (Liverpool to Moorebank).

The route was allocated State Route 54 in 1974, from Liverpool to Newtown. In 1993, its eastern end was extended along King Street and City Road to the intersection with Broadway at Chippendale (replacing State Route 66, itself having replaced National Route 1 the previous year when the opening of the Sydney Harbour Tunnel had it re-aligned). With the conversion to the newer alphanumeric system in 2013, State Route 54 was truncated back to its original eastern terminus at King Street in Newtown and replaced by route A34, with the former extension replaced by route A36 as part of Princes Highway.

== Major intersections ==
LGA	Location	km	mi	Destinations	Notes
Liverpool	Liverpool	0.0	0.0	Hume Highway (A28) – Cabramatta, Camden, Campbelltown	Western terminus of route A34; Western end of Macquarie Street
Liverpool	Liverpool	0.0	0.0	Hoxton Park Road – Hoxton Park, Austral	
Liverpool	Liverpool	0.3	0.19	Macquarie Street (east) – Liverpool	Eastbound entrance and westbound exit only Eastern end of Macquarie Street, western end of Terminus Street
Liverpool	Liverpool	0.8	0.50	Terminus Street (east) – Liverpool; Speed Street (south) – Liverpool	Eastbound exit to Terminus Street only, no right turn eastbound into Speed Street; Eastern end of Terminus Street, western end of Newbridge Road
Liverpool	Liverpool	0.9	0.56	Main Southern railway line	
Georges River		1.1	0.68	Light Horse Bridge	
Liverpool	Moorebank	1.4	0.87	Heathcote Road – Wattle Grove, Lucas Heights, Heathcote	
Georges River		5.9	3.7	Milperra Bridge	
Canterbury-Bankstown	Milperra–Bankstown Aerodrome boundary	6.0	3.7	Henry Lawson Drive – Lansdowne, Padstow Heights	Eastern end of Newbridge Road; Western end of Milperra Road
Canterbury-Bankstown	Revesby	9.8	6.1	The River Road – Revesby Heights	Eastern end of Milperra Road; Western end of Canterbury Road
Canterbury-Bankstown	Bankstown	11.6	7.2	Fairford Road (A6) – Carlingford, Lidcombe, Padstow, Heathcote	No right turn westbound into Fairford Road, no southbound exit from Fairford Road
Canterbury-Bankstown	Punchbowl	12.4	7.7	Punchbowl Road (north) – Punchbowl, Croydon Park; Bramhall Avenue (south) – Punchbowl	
Canterbury-Bankstown	Wiley Park–Roselands boundary	15.0	9.3	King Georges Road (A3) – Mona Vale, Ryde, Greenacre, Blakehurst	
Cooks River		19.5	12.1	Bridge (no known official name)	
Canterbury-Bankstown	Canterbury	19.7	12.2	Bankstown railway line	
Canterbury-Bankstown–Inner West boundary	Hurlstone Park–Ashfield–Dulwich Hill tripoint	20.9	13.0	Old Canterbury Road (north) – Lewisham; Griffiths Street (west) – Ashfield	Eastern end of Canterbury Road; Western end of New Canterbury Road
Inner West	Dulwich Hill	21.9	13.6	Inner West Light Rail	
Inner West	Petersham	24.1	15.0	Crystal Street (north) – Leichhardt; Shaw Street (south) – Petersham	Eastern end of New Canterbury Road; Western end of Stanmore Road
Inner West	Enmore	25.5	15.8	Enmore Road (southwest) – Marrickville; Edgeware Road (southeast) – St Peters	Eastern end of New Canterbury Road; Western end of Enmore Road
Inner West–Sydney boundary	Newtown	26.2	16.3	Main Suburban railway line	
Inner West–Sydney boundary	Newtown	26.2	16.3	King Street (A36) – Chippendale, Blakehurst, Heathcote	Eastern terminus of route A34; Eastern end of Enmore Road
Incomplete access; Route transition
