= Silverwater Bridge =

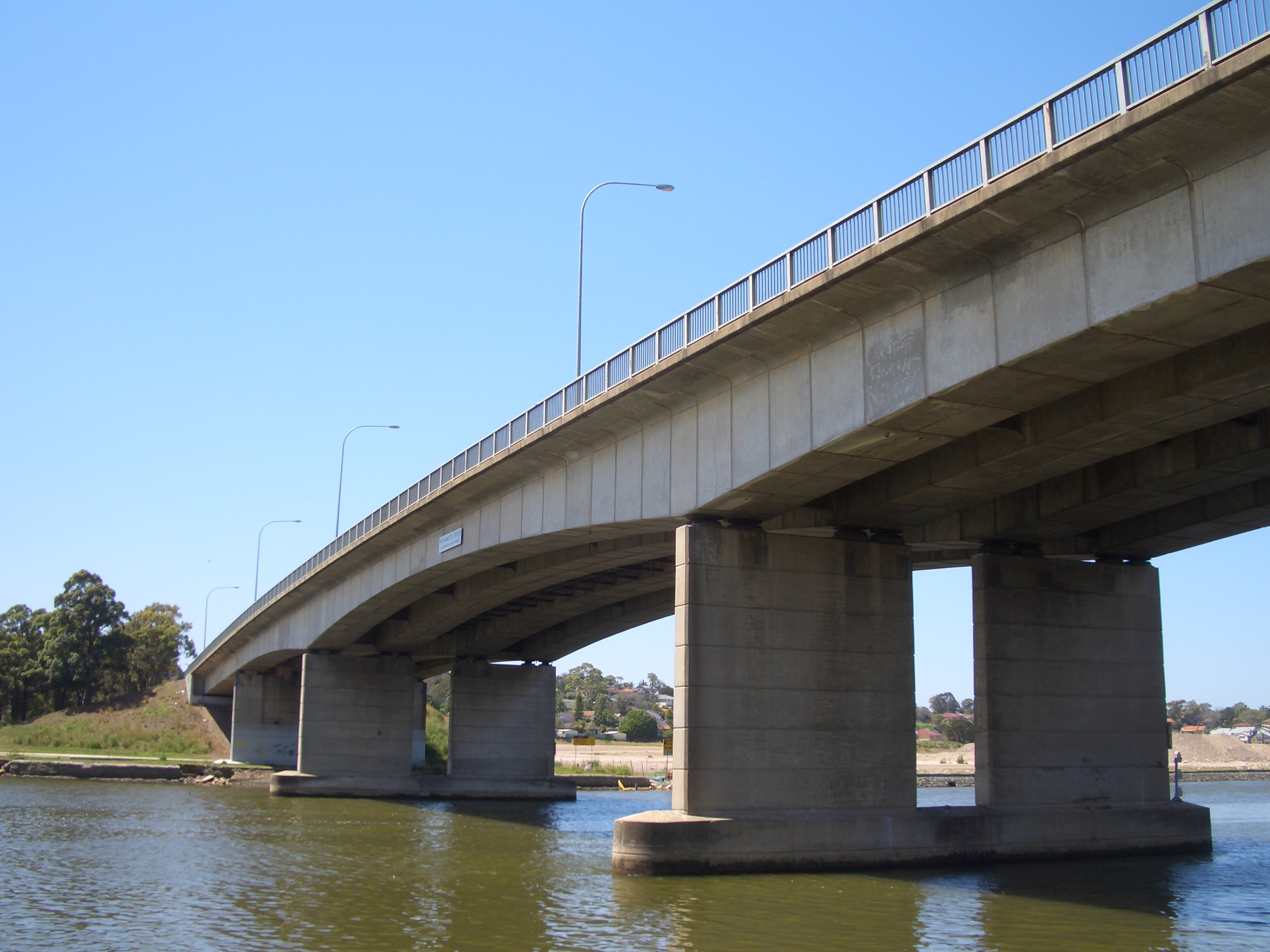
- Silverwater Bridge in 2007
- Coordinates: 33°49′27″S 151°03′05″E
- Carries: Silverwater Road
- Crosses: Parramatta River
- Locale: Silverwater, Sydney, New South Wales, Australia
- Owner: Transport for NSW
- Preceded by: Parramatta Light Rail bridge
- Followed by: John Whitton Bridge

Characteristics
- Design: Box girder
- Material: Concrete and metal
- Total length: 189 metres

History
- Constructed by: John Holland
- Opened: 10 November 1962

Statistics
- Daily traffic: 29,000 (2012)

Location
- Interactive map of Silverwater Bridge

The Silverwater Bridge is a concrete box girder bridge that spans the Parramatta River in Sydney, New South Wales, Australia. The bridge carries Silverwater Road over the river to link Silverwater in the south to Rydalmere and Ermington in the north.

== Description ==
Built by John Holland, the Silverwater Bridge was opened on 10 November 1962 by Premier of New South Wales Bob Heffron and was the first concrete box girder bridge built in New South Wales.

It was the first of the two major bridges needed to construct the Hornsby-Heathcote county road (the other being the Alfords Point Bridge), and was the second project undertaken in the construction of this county road (the first being Olympic Drive, Lidcombe, between Boorea and Church Streets, in 1959).

In conjunction with the construction of the bridge, Silverwater Road between Parramatta Road and the bridge was widened to six lanes, and was extended across the new bridge to connect to Victoria Road at Ermington.

The origin of the suburb's name, and subsequently the bridge's name, is unknown. It may have been a reference to the nearby Parramatta River, which could have provided silver reflections of light off the water.
