= Tom Uglys Bridge =

Australian road bridge

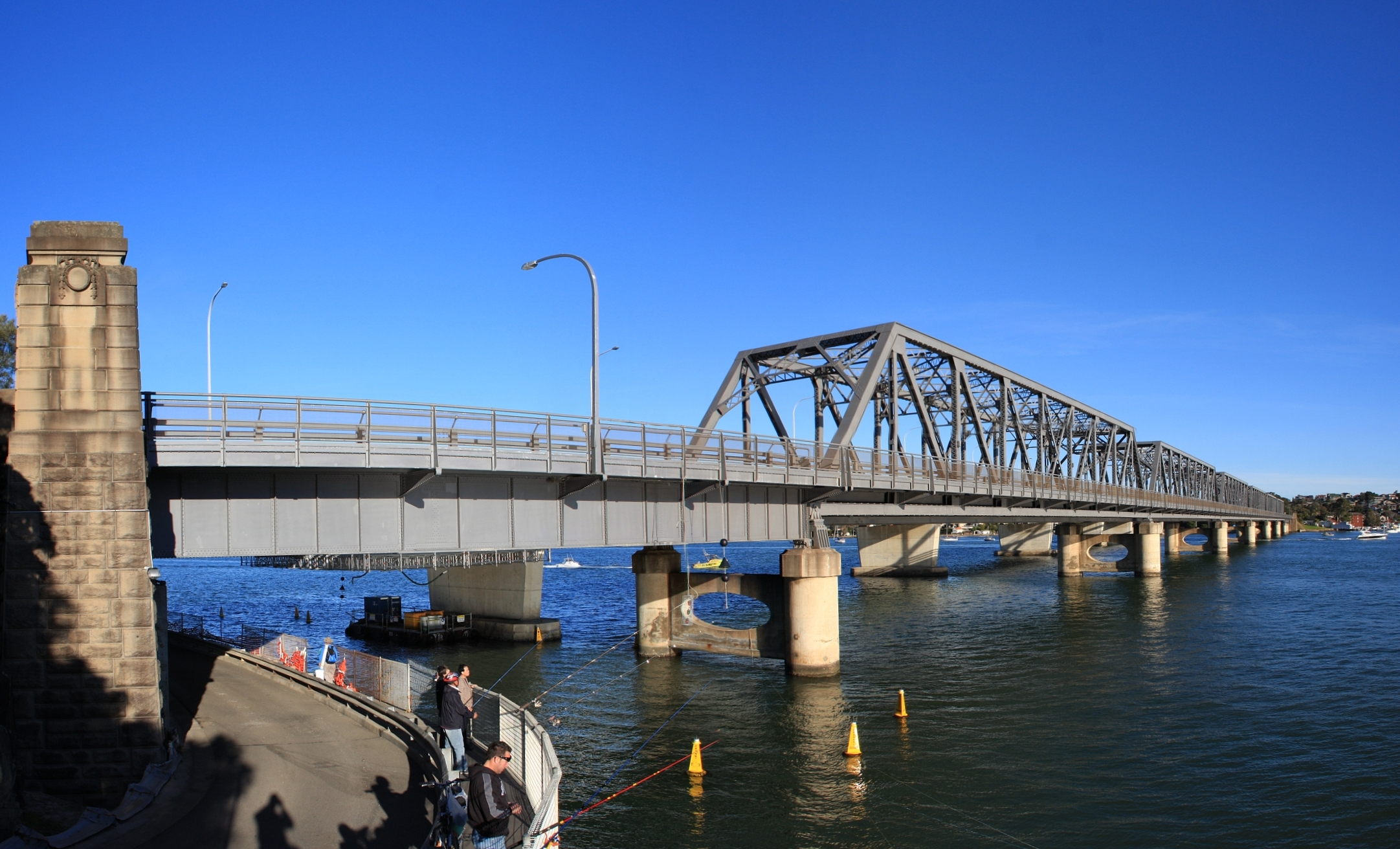
- The Pratt truss spans of the 1929 Tom Uglys Bridge, as viewed from the north
- Coordinates: 34°00′12″S 151°06′48″E
- Carries: Princes Highway: Motor vehicles; Pedestrians; Bicycles
- Crosses: Georges River
- Locale: Sydney, New South Wales, Australia
- Begins: Blakehurst
- Ends: Sylvania
- Owner: Transport for NSW
- Heritage status: 1. New South Wales State Heritage Register; 2. not listed
- Preceded by: Alfords Point Bridge
- Followed by: Captain Cook Bridge

Characteristics
- Design: 1. Pratt truss bridge 2. Box girder
- Material: 1. Steel; 2. Concrete
- Total length: 1. 499 m (1,637 ft); 2. 570 m (1,870 ft)
- Longest span: 1. 69.5 m (228 ft); 2. 70 m (230 ft)
- No. of spans: 1. 9; 2. 9
- No. of lanes: 6

History
- Designer: 1. Percy Allan; 2. unknown
- Constructed by: 1. State Monier Works; 2. Citra Constructions
- Fabrication by: 1. Lindapter International; 2. Citra MED (Homebush)
- Construction start: 1. February 1925; 2. unknown
- Construction end: 1. 26 April 1929; 2. 17 October 1987
- Opened: 1. 11 May 1929; 2. 17 October 1987
- Replaces: Tom Ugly's Punt

Statistics
- Toll: 1. 1929–1952; 2. no toll

Location
- Interactive map of Tom Uglys Bridge

Tom Uglys Bridge consists of two road bridges, completed in 1929 and 1987, that carry the Princes Highway across the Georges River in southern Sydney, in the state of New South Wales, Australia. The bridges link the St George area at Blakehurst to the Sutherland Shire at Sylvania. Tom Uglys Bridge is one of six major road crossings of Georges River.

The 1929 Pratt truss bridge is listed on the New South Wales State Heritage Register and carries three lanes of northbound vehicular traffic on the Princes Highway. The 1987 concrete box girder bridge was built to the east of the older bridge and carries the three southbound lanes of the highway. Both bridges have shared bicycle and pedestrian pathways.

== Tom Uglys Point ferries ==
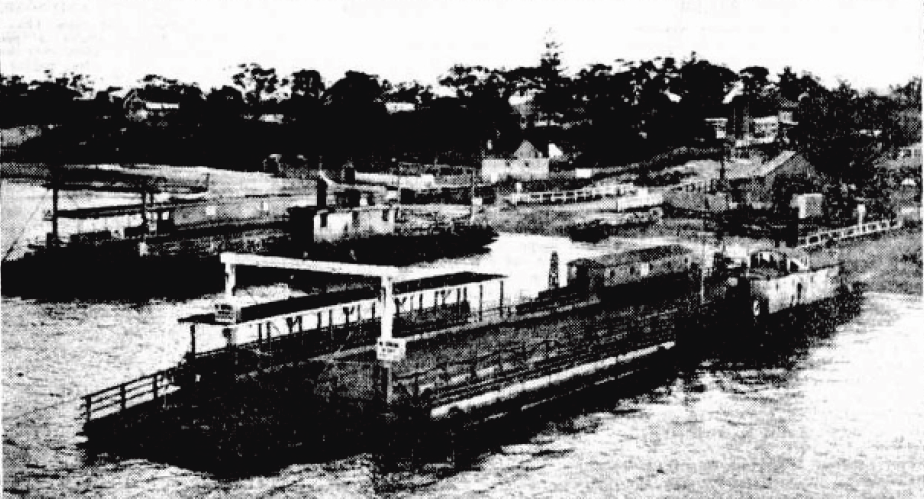
Twin punts running across the Georges River in 1929.

Tenders were called to construct a punt for Tom Ugly's Point in 1864. A hand-operated punt service from Tom Ugly's Point to Horse Rock Point commenced. The ferry service was improved and expanded over the years. In 1882 a steam-driven ferry, guided by steel cables, was installed. It crossed the river in less than ten minutes. The punt was 16 metres (54 ft) long, had a 3.4-metre (11 ft) wide roadway, and was capable of carrying six horse-drawn vehicles. By 1898 a larger steam-driven ferry began operation. It was capable of carrying one hundred passengers and fifteen vehicles. A new punt capable of carrying 28 vehicles and making the crossing in three minutes was installed in 1922. By 1929 there were two cable ferries operating, and delays of several hours were experienced on weekends and public holidays.

== Description ==
=== 1929 bridge ===
Following a long campaign by local councils and motoring authorities, a Government of New South Wales loan to Sutherland Shire Council was used to finance the replacement of one of the punt services across the Georges River. The Bill for the building of a bridge across the Georges River was introduced into New South Wales Parliament in 1923, and the foundation stone for the bridge was laid on 7 June 1924. The funds borrowed by Sutherland Shire Council were to be repaid by a bridge toll once it was opened. As use of the punt was free the bridge toll was controversial. The crossing was first opened for traffic on 26 April 1929, and officially opened by the Governor of New South Wales on 11 May 1929. It was known as the George's River Bridge.

The 1929 bridge consists of nine steel truss spans forming a total length of 499 metres (1,637 ft); six spans were 69.5 metres (228 ft) and three spans were 27.4 metres (90 ft). The bridge was designed by Percy Allan who designed many bridges in New South Wales including the Pyrmont Bridge. When the bridge was opened it was the longest bridge in Australia.

The toll was collected on the Sylvania side of the bridge by toll collectors who stood on the road. On 31 May 1952 the tolls were removed after the council repaid the loan to the Government of New South Wales.

In the late 1940s the lanes on the bridge were reconfigured to provide a third lane, and this allowed the introduction of a reversible lane (northbound in the morning and southbound in the evening), which continued until the second bridge was opened. Notwithstanding the creation of the third lane, by the mid-1960s congestion had grown to a significant level, especially on summer weekend afternoons. However it was not for another twenty years that funding was allocated by the New South Wales government for the design and construction of a duplicate bridge.

In 2006, the 1929 steel truss bridge was repainted. The original lead paint was removed using a blasting process and an air extraction system was employed to safely remove airborne particles, protecting the environment as well as the workers.

=== The 1987 bridge ===
Tenders for a second bridge were called for in 1983.

It opened on 17 October 1987, also with nine spans (in order to place the piers in line with those of the first bridge) of three identical steel box girders, composite with a cast-in-place reinforced concrete deck; the major spans are 70 metres (230 ft) in length with end spans of 50 metres (160 ft).

The new bridge was designed to carry four lanes of traffic. During repair work on the 1929 bridge, when it was temporarily closed to traffic, the 1987 bridge was configured to carry one lane northbound and three lanes southbound.

=== Features of both bridges ===
Most duplicate bridges are close together (like the dual bridges at Ryde) and parallel, allowing the form of the road approaches to continue. However, at Tom Uglys Point, the two bridges are not parallel. They are less than 5 metres (16 ft) apart at the northern end, but about 62 metres (203 ft) apart at the southern end. This avoids replication of the pair of tight curves on the southern approach to the 1929 bridge on the southern exit from the second bridge.

On the southern side, between the two bridges, is a boat ramp, accessible from the northbound bridge approach. On the northern side a loop road allows drivers travelling south along the Princes Highway (A1) to avoid the bridge and return northwards along the highway.

== Etymology ==
Tom Uglys Bridge took its name from the geographical feature at the northern end of the bridge, known as Tom Uglys Point. The point was known as Tom Uglys Point over 80 years prior to the construction of the bridge. At various times the bridge is incorrectly transcribed as Tom Ugly's Bridge.

There are several theories about the origin of the name of the point.

- One is that it was named after a local resident Tom Huxley and the name was a mispronunciation by local Aboriginal people. Descendants of Thomas Huxley have concluded that he lived and owned land in the area but official records do not exist to verify this.
- Another theory is that it was derived from the name of a local Aboriginal man, Tow-weiry, who lived in the area and died about 1846.
- Another theory is that there was a local fisherman resident in the area by the name of Tom Illigley.
- Yet another is that there was a one-legged man, possibly an army deserter or a boat operator, called either "Tom Woggleg" or "Wogul Leg Tom", either because of a mispronunciation of wooden leg, or from the local Aboriginal dialect word for "one".

The name was officially adopted to distinguish between the various subsequent bridges across Georges River, after the opening of the Captain Cook Bridge in 1965 and the Alfords Point Bridge in 1973.

== Gallery ==
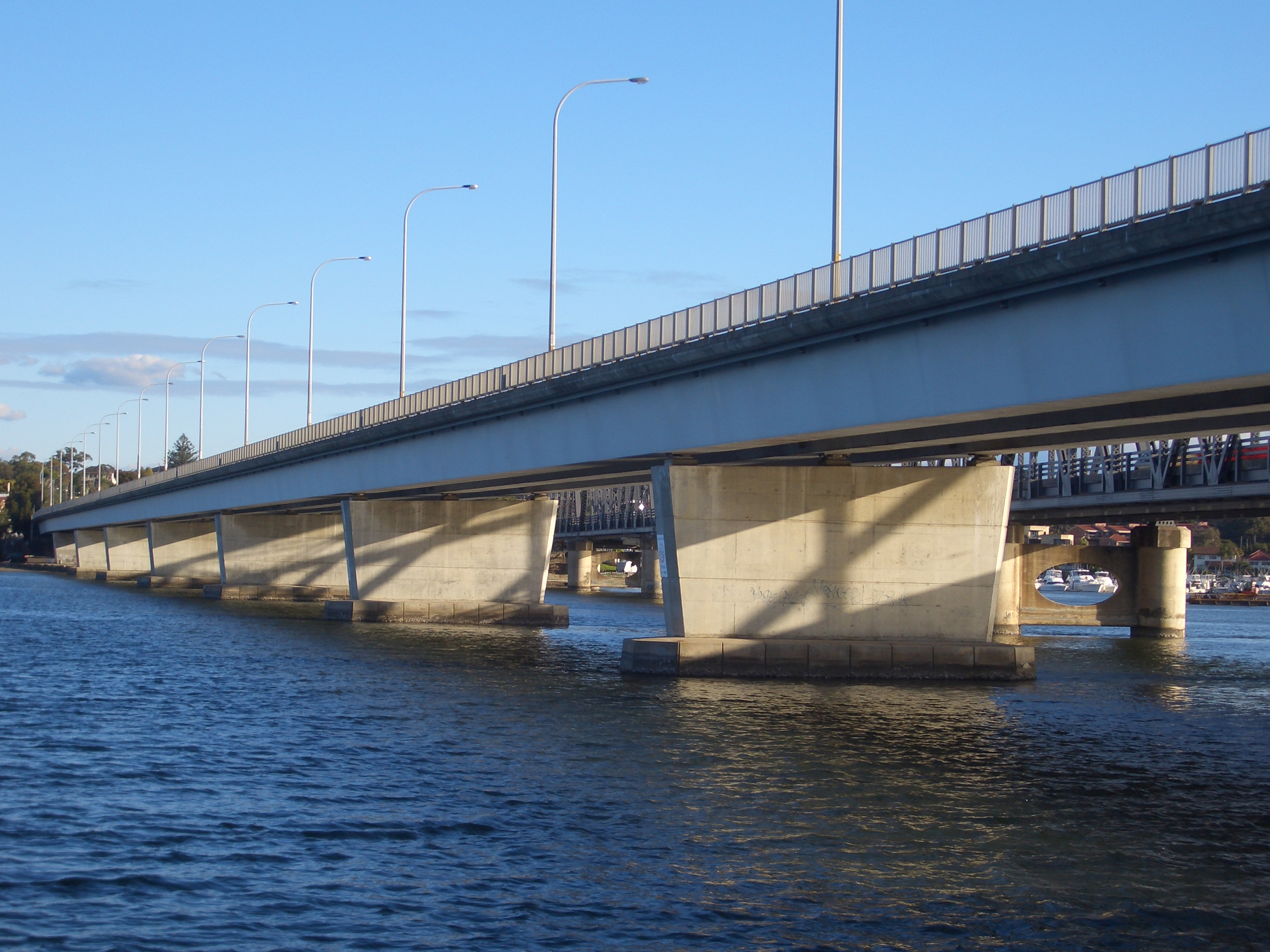
The 1987 span, view from north.

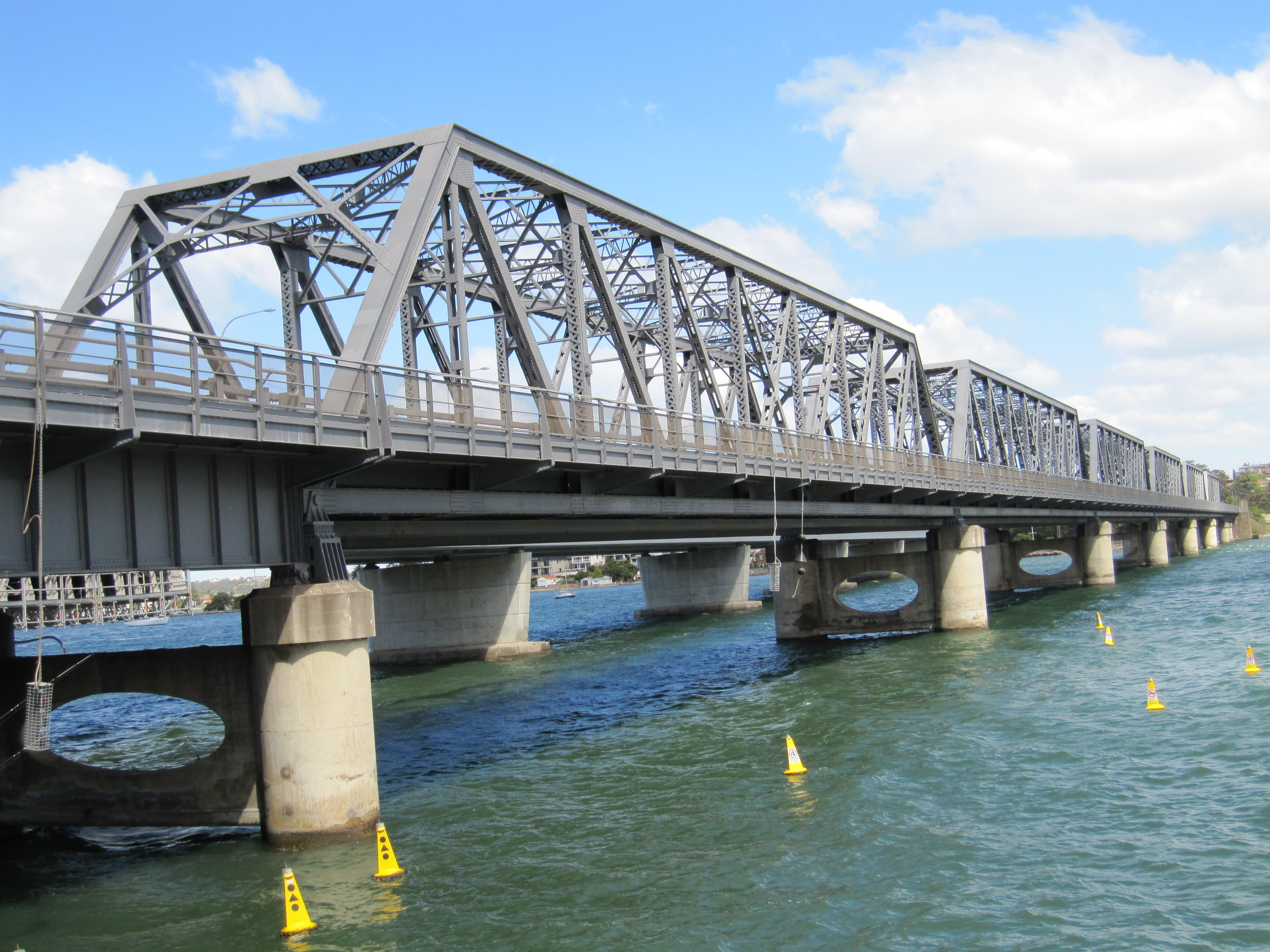
The 1929 span, view from north.

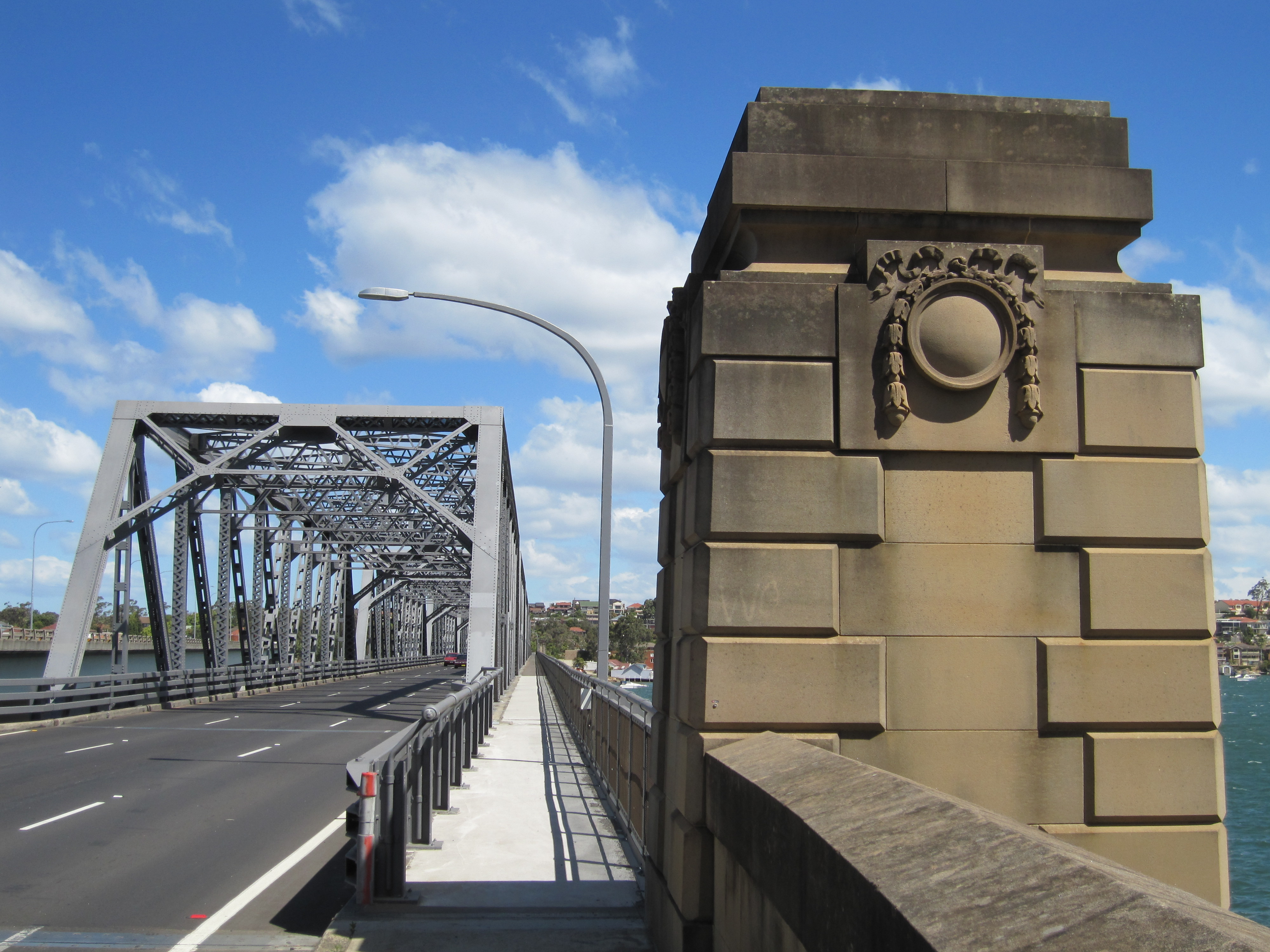
Princes Highway (A1), northbound.

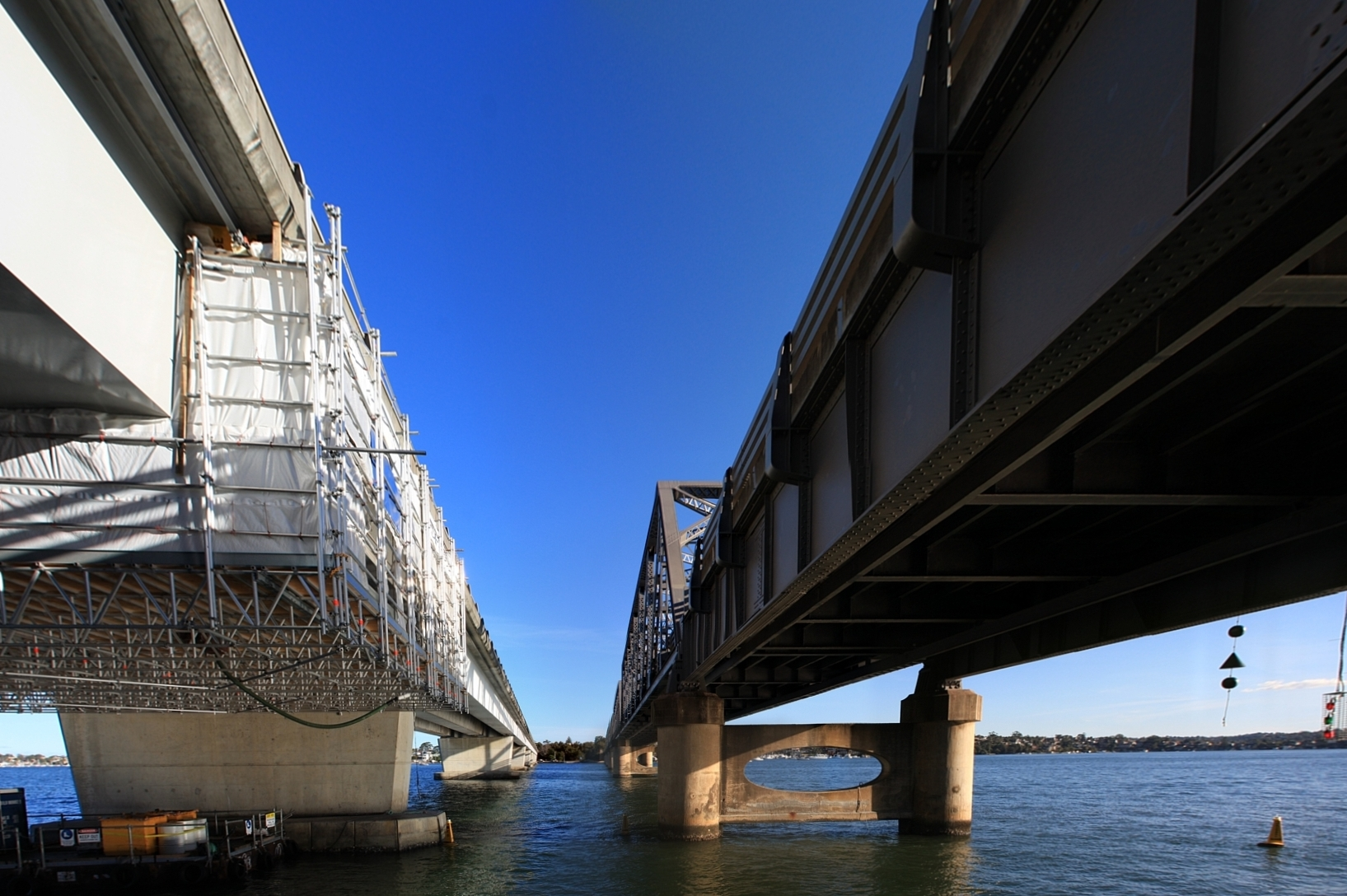
View from Loop Road, on the northern side.

== See also ==
- List of bridges in Sydney
- Princes Motorway (A1)
