= Alfords Point Bridge =

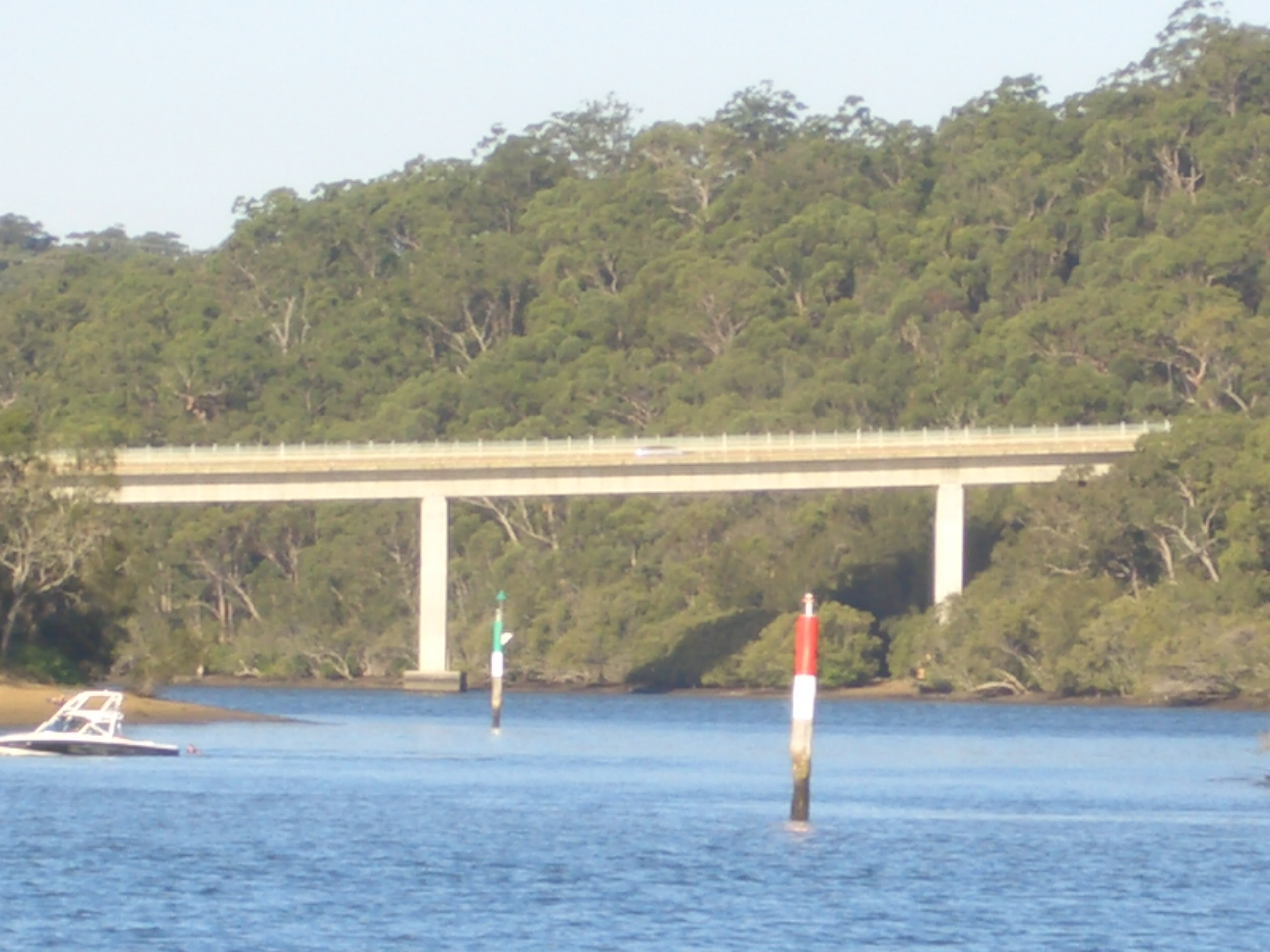
- Alfords Point Bridge in 2007, prior to completion of the duplication of the bridge
- Coordinates: 33°58′39″S 151°01′50″E
- Carries: Alfords Point Road: Motor vehicles; grade-separated pedestrian footpath
- Crosses: Georges River
- Locale: Sutherland Shire/City of Canterbury-Bankstown, Sydney, New South Wales, Australia
- Maintained by: Transport for NSW
- Preceded by: M5 Motorway bridge
- Followed by: Tom Uglys Bridge

Characteristics
- Design: Duplicated box girder
- Material: Concrete
- Trough construction: Steel
- Total length: 445 metres (1,460 ft)
- Width: 15.3 metres (50 ft) per carriageway
- No. of spans: 10
- Piers in water: 6
- No. of lanes: 3 northbound; 3 southbound

History
- Opened: 7 September 1973; 22 August 2008 (duplication)
- Replaces: Vehicular punt between Lugarno and Illawong

Location
- Interactive map of Alfords Point Bridge

Alfords Point Bridge is a twin 445-metre-long (1,460 ft) concrete and steel box girder road bridge that carries Alford Point Road as state route A6 across the lower Georges River between Padstow Heights in the City of Canterbury-Bankstown and Alfords Point in the Sutherland Shire in Sydney, New South Wales, Australia.

The first bridge opened on 7 September 1973. Although the deck was built wide enough to accommodate three lanes of traffic, it carried one lane of traffic in each direction. In 1980 the lane arrangements on the bridge were changed to provide a third lane, and a tidal-flow traffic management system was introduced, with two lanes northbound in the morning and two lanes southbound in the evenings.

When the first bridge was built, a second set of piles and abutments was built a few metres downstream, allowing for future duplication. The second bridge was opened for southbound traffic on 22 August 2008, leaving the first bridge for northbound use only.

== Description ==
There are two other road crossings over Georges River downstream of the Alfords Point Bridge: the Captain Cook Bridge, which opened in 1965 and connects Sans Souci to Taren Point; and the Tom Uglys Bridge, which opened in 1929 and connects Blakehurst to Sylvania.

== History ==
The bridge was built as the last link in the Hornsby-Heathcote county road (although a number of route realignments followed), and serves a metropolitan function. Construction of the bridge allowed the decommissioning (in 1976) of Lugarno ferry, which had operated since 1843 on Surveyor-General Thomas Mitchell's line of the Illawarra Road. The ferry had operated between Lugarno and Illawong.

== See also ==
- List of bridges in Sydney
