= Alfords Point =

- Suburb
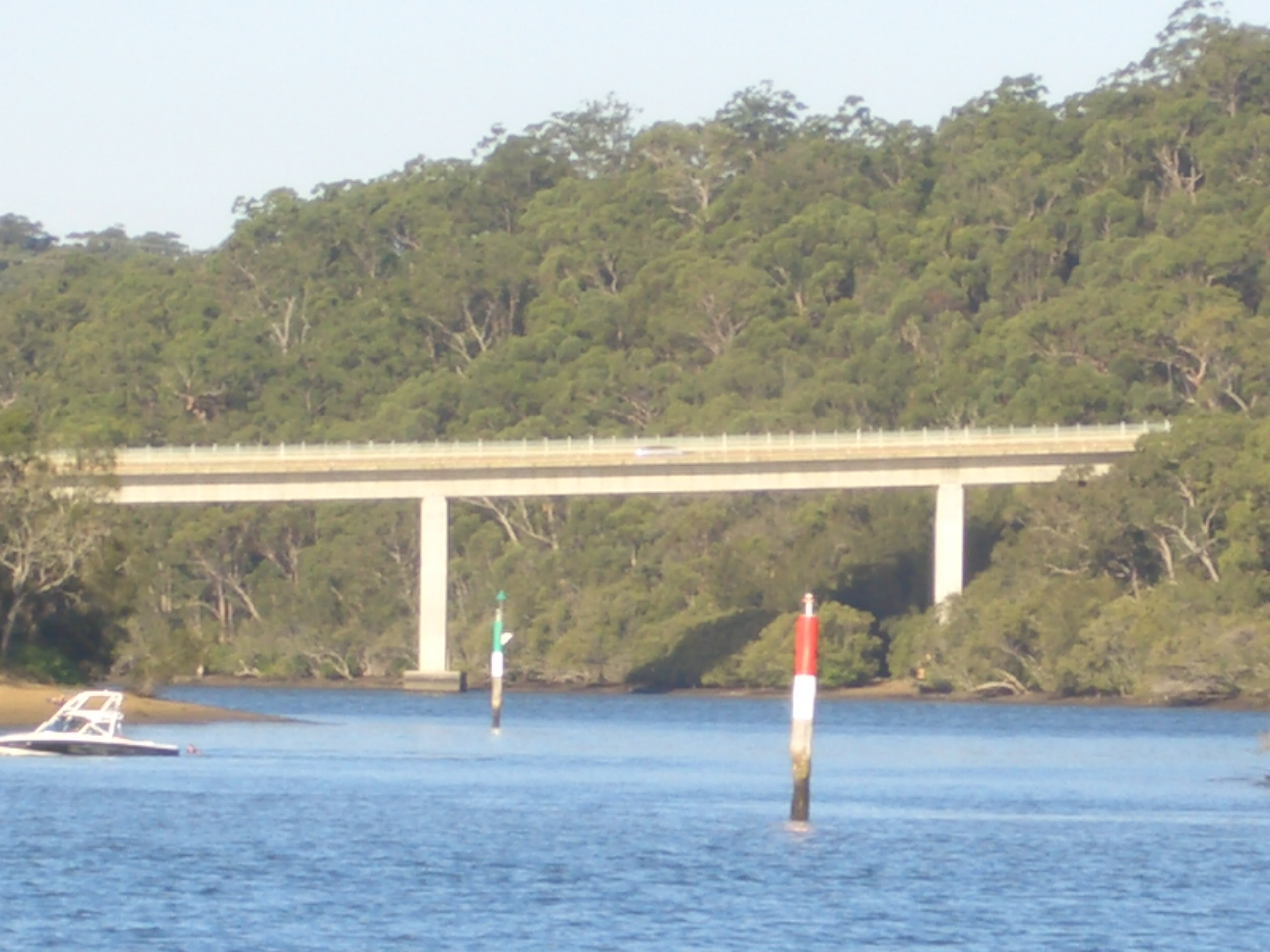
- Alfords Point Bridge over Georges River

- Interactive map of Alfords Point
- Country: Australia
- State: New South Wales
- City: Sydney
- LGA: Sutherland Shire
- Location: 28 km (17 mi) SW of Sydney CBD

Government
  - State electorate: Miranda
  - Federal division: Hughes
- Elevation: 98 m (322 ft)

Population
  - Total: 3,131 (2021 census)
- Postcode: 2234
Suburbs around Alfords Point
Picnic Point	Revesby Heights	Padstow Heights
Padstow	Alfords Point	Lugarno
Menai	Illawong	Illawong

Alfords Point is a suburb in southern Sydney, in the state of New South Wales, Australia. Alfords Point is 28 kilometres south of the Sydney central business district, within the local government area of the Sutherland Shire. Alfords Point shares the postcode of 2234 with neighbouring suburbs of Menai, Bangor and Illawong.

Alfords Point is on the southern bank of the Georges River. The suburb is nearly completely surrounded by bushland from the Georges River nature Reserve and with Alfords Point Road within its eastern border running south to north onto the Alfords Point Road Bridge across the Georges River towards Padstow. Brushwood Drive is the only road to enter and exit Alfords Point.

== History ==
Jane Alford, widow of John Alford Senior owned 50 acres (200,000 m^{2}) of land near here in 1828. Alford was originally the name given to an area of public reserve on the bank of the Georges River.

When the Sutherland Shire was officially formed in 1906, the western boundary extended to what is today called Menai (then called Bangor). In 1922, a proclamation was made to allow for an adjustment of the shire boundaries and include the areas which are now Illawong and Alfords Point. The area was formerly attached to the Municipality of Hurstville. Modern Alfords Point began to develop alongside the Menai Town Centre initiative in the late 1970s-1980s with large plots of bushland divided for housing development.

The Alfords Point Bridge was built across the Georges River connecting the Sutherland Shire with Canterbury-Bankstown. This connected the suburbs of Alfords Point and Padstow Heights. The first bridge opened on 7 September 1973, which only accommodated three lanes. The second bridge was built next to it, opening on 22 August 2008, making it three lanes north and three lanes south.

Alfords Point residents have been victim to bushfires, perhaps the most infamous being those of the 1994 Eastern seaboard fires which claimed many homes in the area, particularly those directly neighbouring the Georges River National Park. Other recent bushfires in the area occurred in Summer 1997–98 and Summer 2001–2002, however, damage to property was limited due to improved bush prevention as a result of the 1993–94 disaster.

== Demographics ==
According to the 2021 census of Population, there were 3,131 people in Alfords Point. 76.1% of people were born in Australia. 70.9% of people only spoke English at home. Other languages spoken at home included Greek 6.2% and Arabic 5.8%. The most common responses for religious affiliation were Catholic 31.9%, No Religion 18.4%, Orthodox 14.9% and Anglican 12.1%.

== Commercial area ==
Alfords Point has a small group of shops on Brushwood Drive adjacent to Alfords Point Public School. Shops include a hair salon, pharmacy, convenience store, Charcoal Chicken & Pizza take-away and the Menai Dance Centre.

== Sport and recreation ==
Alfords Point contains two sporting ovals, one named Casuarina Road Oval positioned on Casuarina Road and the other named Narina Park positioned on Coachwood Crescent, which are used for soccer and cricket in local competitions. Narina Park also hosts the Alfords Point Community Centre, which can be hired out from Sutherland Shire Council. Natural bushland is abundant in this area, as Alfords Point is positioned on the shores of the Georges River and National Park, with many walking tracks and firetrails popular amongst locals in summer.

== Education ==
Alfords Point Primary School K-6 is a community-oriented school that often hosts community events and functions. Alfords Point Pre-School Kindergarten (Blessed By Bubs Early Learning Centre/Best Kidz Alfords Point), an early learning centre, is located opposite the shops.

== Street names ==
The street theme of Alfords Point is types of flora; trees and shrubs.

Examples include: Brushwood Drive, Lavender Place, Eucalyptus Street.

== Notable residents ==
- Steve Waugh – Former Australian cricket captain
- Steve Smith – Australian international cricketer
