= Illawong =

- Suburb
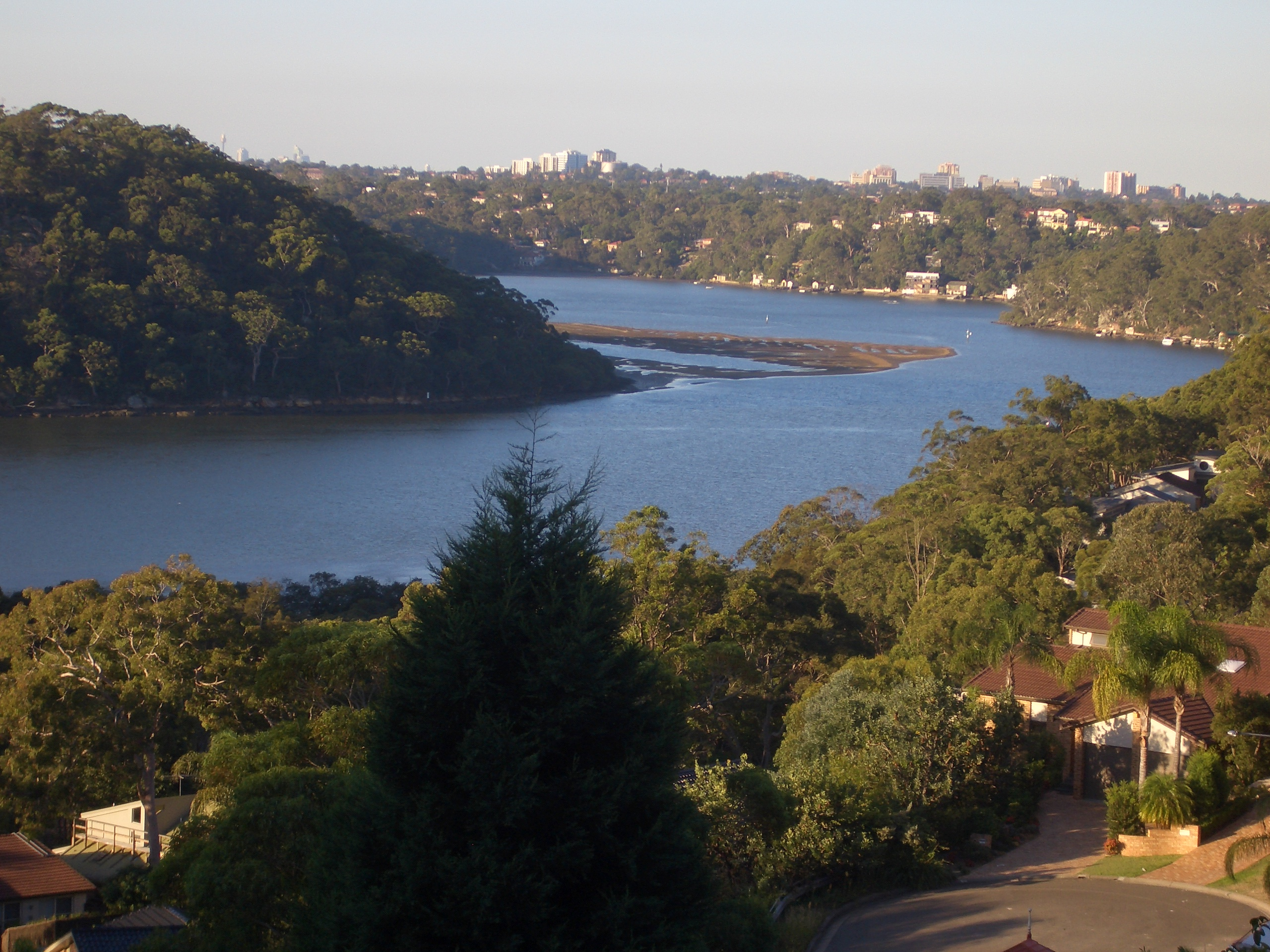
- Illawong, view of Georges River

- Interactive map of Illawong
- Country: Australia
- State: New South Wales
- City: Sydney
- LGA: Sutherland Shire
- Location: 27 km (17 mi) south-west of Sydney CBD

Government
  - State electorate: Miranda
  - Federal division: Hughes
- Elevation: 99 m (325 ft)

Population
  - Total: 7,427 (2021 census)
- Postcode: 2234
Suburbs around Illawong
Alfords Point	Lugarno	Lugarno
Menai	Illawong	Oatley
Bangor	Bonnet Bay	Como

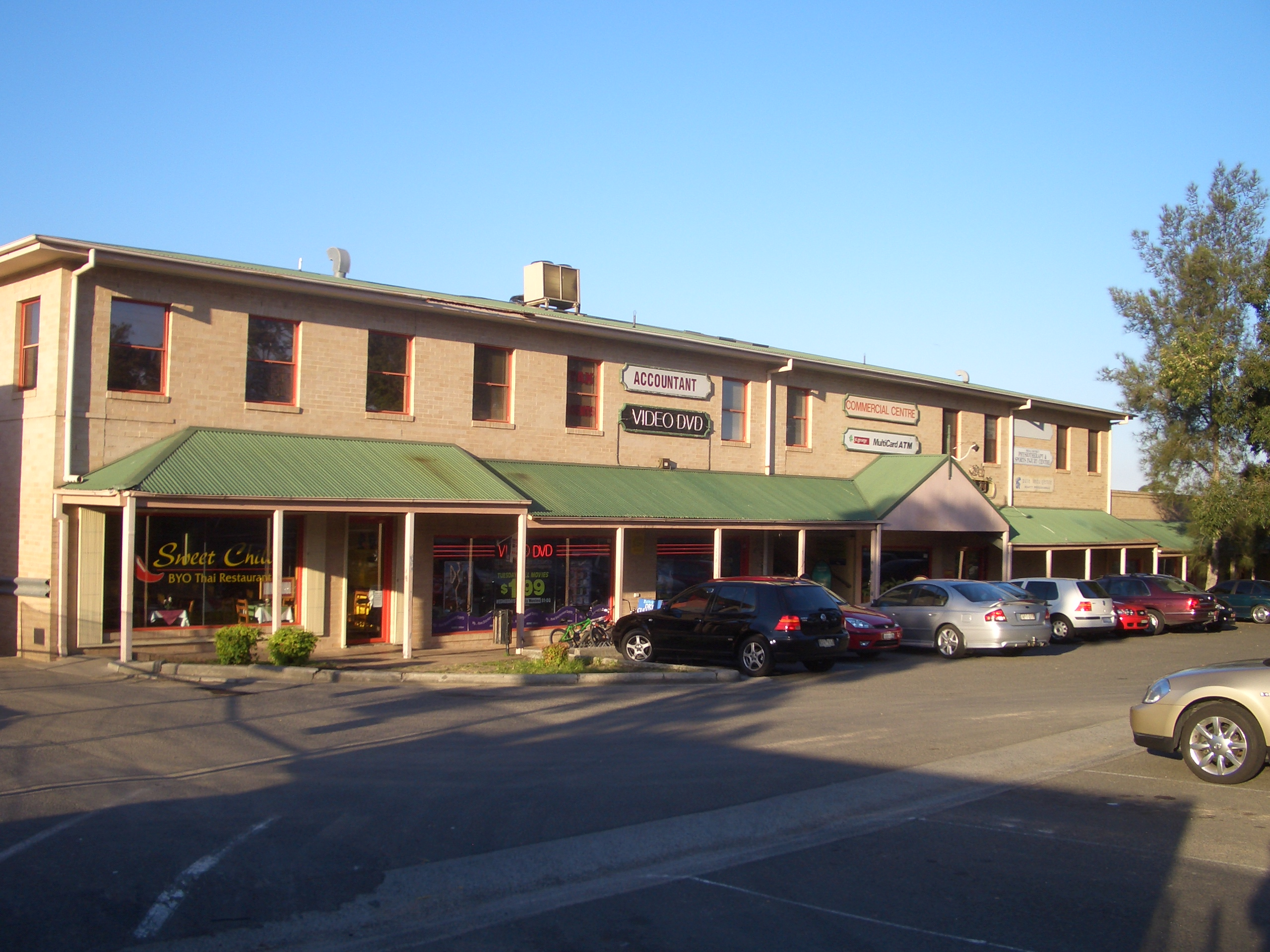
Illawong Village shopping centre

Illawong is a suburb in southern Sydney, in the state of New South Wales, Australia. Illawong is located 27 kilometres south of the Sydney Central Business District, in the local government area of the Sutherland Shire in the area commonly called Menai. The postcode is 2234, which is also assigned to the contiguous suburbs of Menai, Bangor, Barden Ridge and Alfords Point.

Illawong sits between the southern shore of the Georges River and the northern shore of the Woronora River. Illawong consists mainly of residential homes, a nursing home, two primary schools, a high school and a small shopping centre.

== History ==
Illawong is an Aboriginal word meaning between two waters, referring to the Georges and Woronora Rivers. Illawong was originally inhabited by the Tharawal and/or Eora tribes who left remnants of their lives in many middens, rock carvings and cave paintings. The Illawong Nature Reserve also lies "between two waters". In this case, the reserve lies between a system of 2 wetlands, which in combination with the heavily vegetated ridgeland, provide habitat which is particularly suited to the long necked turtle.

Captain John Hunter (1731–1821) was the first European to explore the area. In 1789, Hunter sailed through the Georges and Woronora Rivers. In 1795–96, with Matthew Flinders and George Bass, Hunter explored further up the Georges River and declared the area of Bankstown.

Construction of Old Illawarra Road took place between 1843 and 1845 and was inspected by Major Thomas Mitchell, it being one of the last public works completed by convicts. The construction allowed the new route to be about 32 kilometres shorter towards the South Coast. At the southern end of the district Major Mitchell took the road across the ford at the head of the Woronora River, naming the ford "Pass of Sabugal", possibly due to the resemblance in scenery of the north-eastern frontier of Portugal.

In the 1890s, Menai was a farming area and Illawong, which was then known as East Menai, was an area where wealthy people of Sydney built holiday homes and weekenders.

Originally, Illawong was part of Hurstville Municipality, but became part of Sutherland Shire in 1921.

During the 1970s the Menai region was suburbanised, and Illawong was chosen to have historic nautical street names. (Bangor, New South Wales having Aboriginal names, Alfords Point, New South Wales having botanic names and Barden Ridge, New South Wales having names to do with Australian pioneers.

This area was ravaged in the 1994 Eastern seaboard fires, which also caused destruction in the suburbs of Alfords Point, Bangor, Menai and Como. Illawong is considered to be a bushfire prone area.

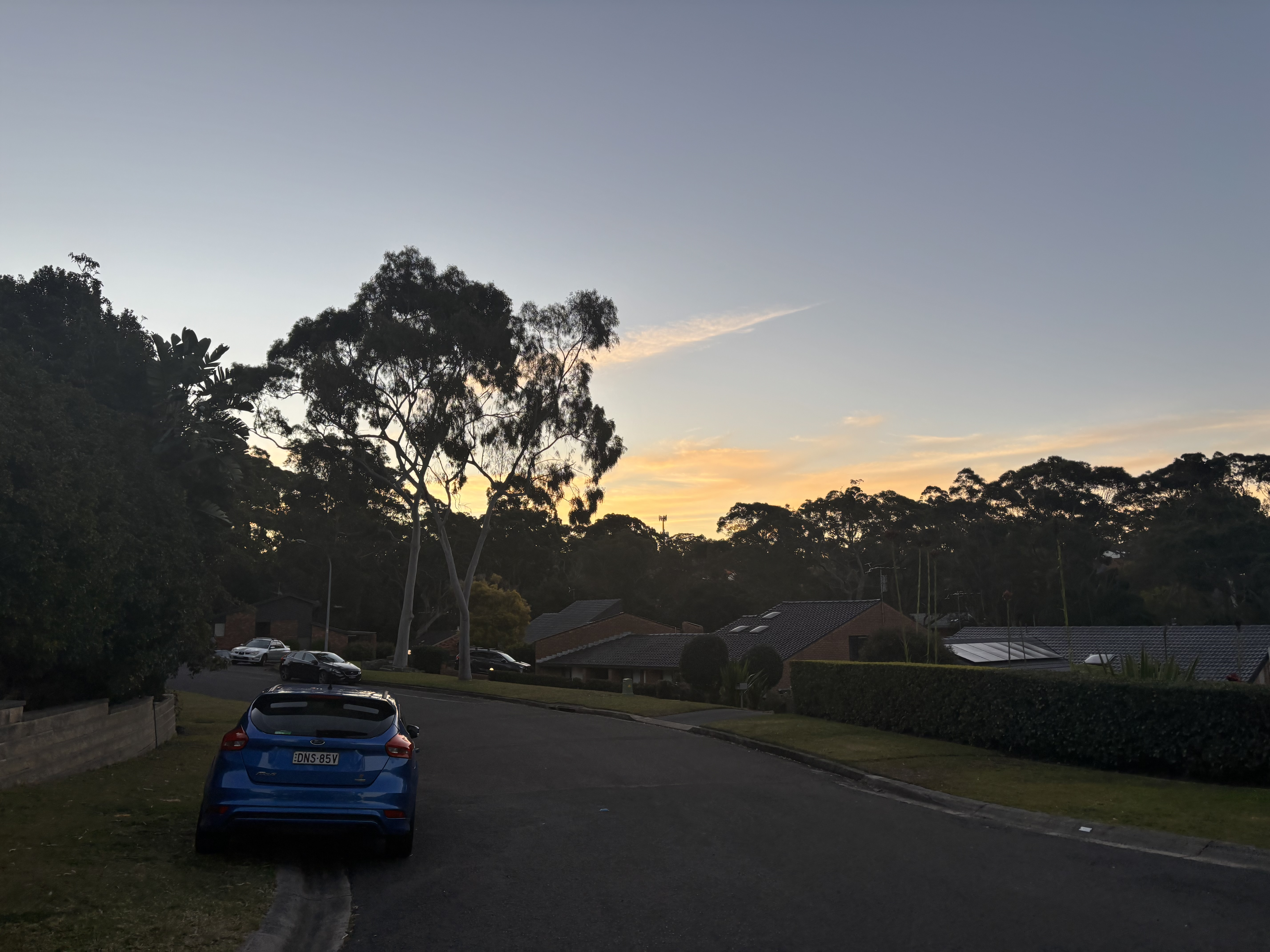
a street in Illawong

== Demographics ==
At the 2021 census, there were 7,427 residents in Illawong. The most common ancestries in Illawong were English 29.7%, Australian 27.8%, Irish 9.2%, Scottish 8.1% and Greek 7.7%. 74.4% of people were born in Australia. The next most common countries of birth were England 2.6%, China 2.4%, Lebanon 2.2%, New Zealand 1.2% and Greece 1.2%. 73.8% of people spoke only English at home. Other languages spoken at home included Arabic 5.5%, Greek 4.2%, Mandarin 1.9%, Cantonese 1.8% and Macedonian 1.7%. The most common responses for religion were Catholic 29.5%, No Religion 23.5%, Anglican 14.6%, Eastern Orthodox 10.5% and Islam 3.8%. The median weekly household income was $2,778 and this was considerably higher than the national figure of $1,746. Most dwellings were separate houses and these tended to be large, with 74.2% of dwellings having 4 or more bedrooms.

== Commercial area ==
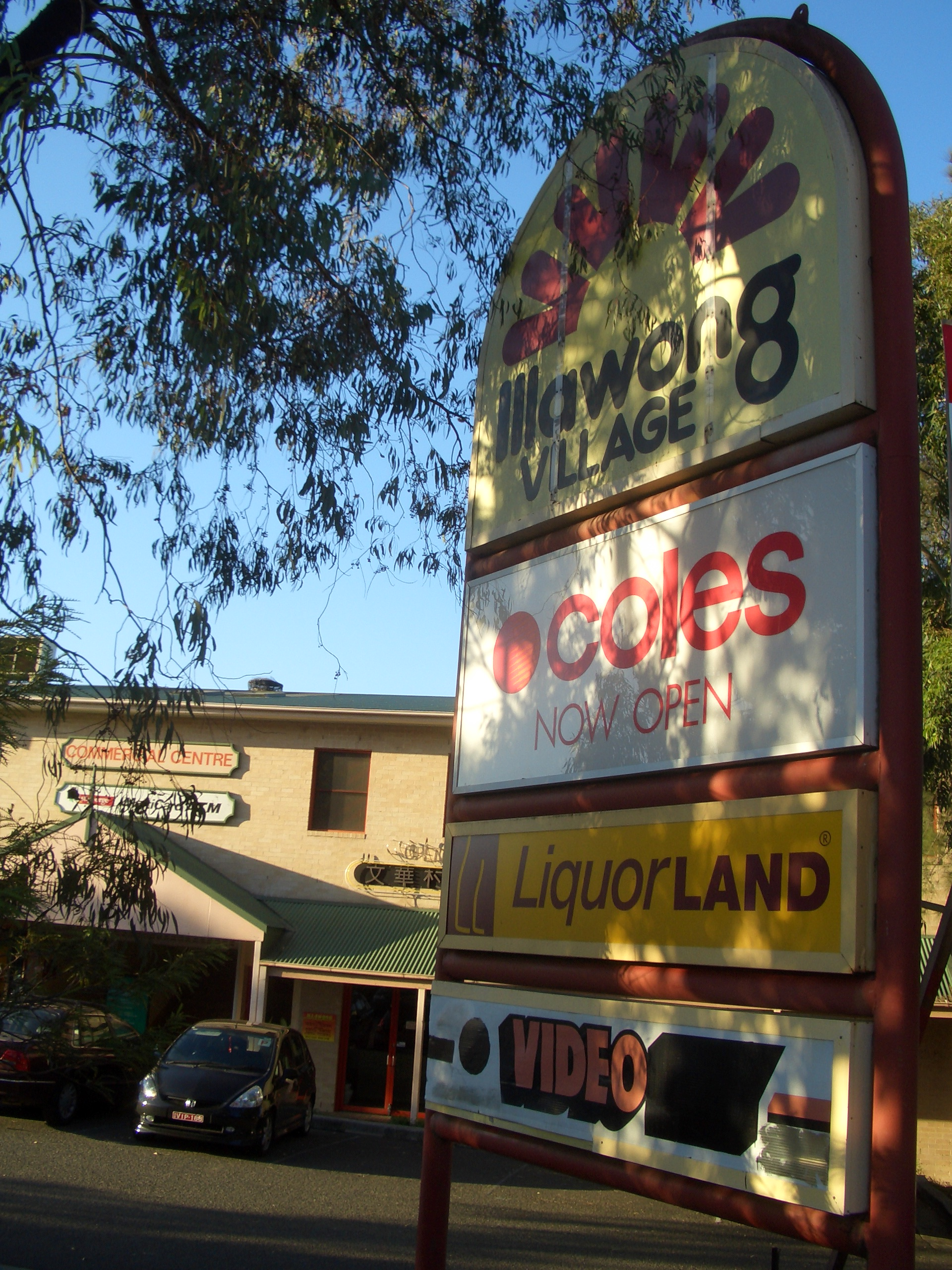
Illawong Village shopping centre

Illawong Village shopping centre sits between Fowler Road and Hobart Place. Originally a small collection of shops, the shopping centre was rebuilt in 2007. Illawong Village features a supermarket, large liquor store and many specialty shops including butcher, chemist, gift shops and several cafes and restaurants.

== Transport ==
Major roads include Fowler Road and Moreton Road. U-Go Mobility has regular bus services which links Illawong to surrounding centres such as Menai, Sutherland and Bankstown.

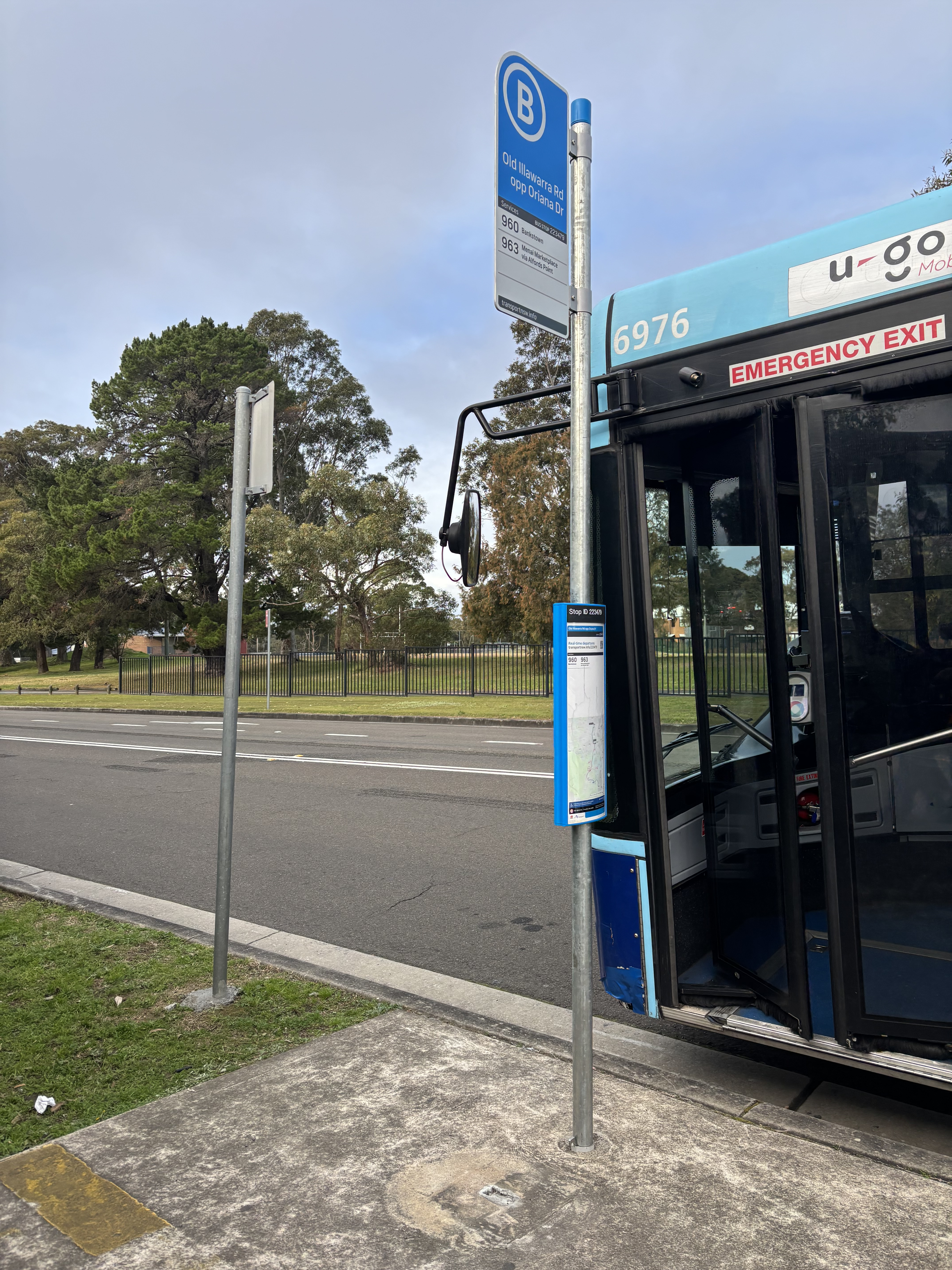
Old Illawarra Rd opp Oriana Dr bus stop. A bus stop just on the border between Illawong and Menai

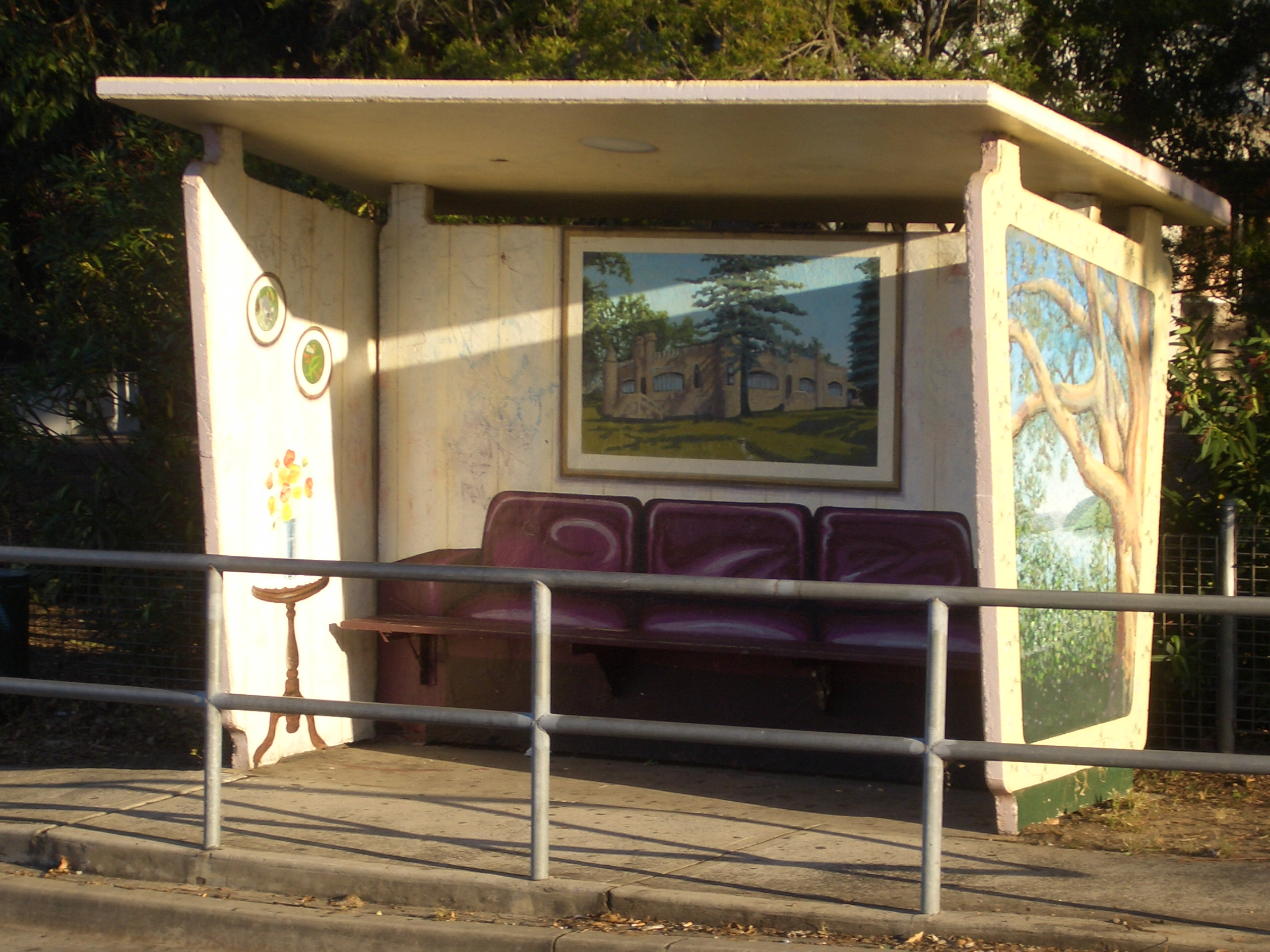
Old bus stop at Illawong Public School

== Schools ==
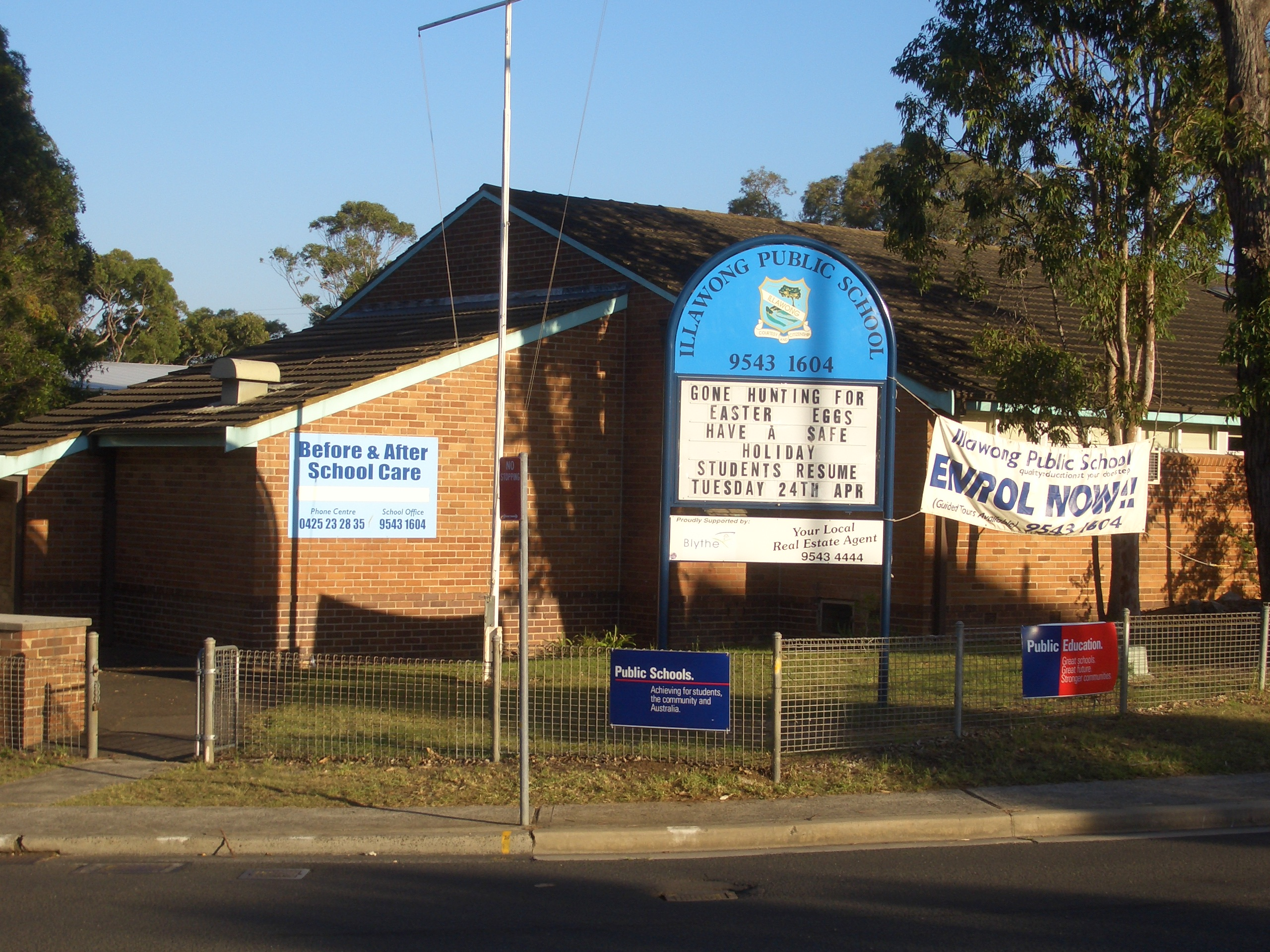
Illawong Public School

- Illawong Primary School
- Tharawal Primary School
- Menai High School is the major public secondary co-educational high school servicing the Menai area.

== Churches ==
The church within Illawong is the Menai Illawong Uniting Church, near the Illawong shopping centre.

== Sport and recreation ==
The Scout group in Illawong is 1st Wearne Bay Sea Scouts. They have all five youth sections (Joeys, Cubs, Scouts, Venturers and Rovers) represented. The group meets in the scout hall at Wearne Bay, on the Georges River. This hall was previously the house of the former ferry master, Mr Maurie Chegwidden. The Sea Scout group was started in 1966 by Mr Ron Robertson,(first Scoutmaster), Mr William Arthur (Skip) Ross and his wife Mrs Yvonne Marlene Ross (aka Akela) Cubmaster. In the early days of the group invaluable assistance was provided by Mr Steve Hobkirk in a group leadership role. The original hall was located in a boatshed on the waterfront nearby to the present day scout hall.

== Emergency Services ==
The Menai/Illawong Rural Fire Service (RFS) is located on the Old Illawarra Road roundabout intersection with Fowler Road.
