= Electoral results for the district of East Hills =

Election results for East Hills, New South Wales, Australia

East Hills, an electoral district of the Legislative Assembly in the Australian state of New South Wales, has existed from 1953 to the present.

== Members for East Hills ==
Election	Member	Party
1953	Arthur Williams	Labor
1956	Joe Kelly	Labor
1959	Joe Kelly	Labor
1962	Joe Kelly	Labor
1965	Joe Kelly	Labor
1968	Joe Kelly	Labor
1971	Joe Kelly	Labor
1973	Pat Rogan	Labor
1976	Pat Rogan	Labor
1978	Pat Rogan	Labor
1981	Pat Rogan	Labor
1984	Pat Rogan	Labor
1988	Pat Rogan	Labor
1991	Pat Rogan	Labor
1995	Pat Rogan	Labor
1999	Alan Ashton	Labor
2003	Alan Ashton	Labor
2007	Alan Ashton	Labor
2011	Glenn Brookes	Liberal
2015	Glenn Brookes	Liberal
2019	Wendy Lindsay	Liberal
2023	Kylie Wilkinson	Labor

== Election results ==
=== 2023 ===
2023 New South Wales state election: East Hills
Party	Candidate	Votes	%	±%
Labor	Kylie Wilkinson	22,140	43.9	+3.2
Liberal	Wendy Lindsay	21,996	43.6	+2.1
Greens	Natalie Hanna	3,578	7.1	+2.2
Independent	Chris Brogan	2,679	5.3	+5.3
Total formal votes		50,393	95.2	−0.1
Informal votes		2,544	4.8	+0.1
Turnout		52,937	88.7	−0.2
Two-party-preferred result
Labor	Kylie Wilkinson	24,677	51.7	+1.8
Liberal	Wendy Lindsay	23,013	48.3	−1.8
Labor gain from Liberal		Swing	+1.8	

=== Elections in the 2010s ===
==== 2019 ====
2019 New South Wales state election: East Hills
Party	Candidate	Votes	%	±%
Liberal	Wendy Lindsay	19,963	41.92	−2.27
Labor	Cameron Murphy	19,152	40.22	−1.83
Greens	Suzan Virago	2,298	4.83	−1.79
Christian Democrats	Owen Butt	2,159	4.53	−0.33
Keep Sydney Open	Lisa Maddock	1,773	3.72	+3.72
Independent	Chris Brogan	1,346	2.83	+2.83
Animal Justice	Heather Barnes	932	1.96	+1.96
Total formal votes		47,623	95.41	−0.31
Informal votes		2,292	4.59	+0.31
Turnout		49,915	90.52	−1.58
Two-party-preferred result
Liberal	Wendy Lindsay	21,646	50.50	+0.08
Labor	Cameron Murphy	21,217	49.50	−0.08
Liberal hold		Swing	+0.08	

==== 2015 ====
2015 New South Wales state election: East Hills
Party	Candidate	Votes	%	±%
Liberal	Glenn Brookes	20,975	44.2	+2.9
Labor	Cameron Murphy	19,958	42.1	+1.0
Greens	Astrid O'Neill	3,141	6.6	+1.7
Christian Democrats	Violet Abdulla	2,310	4.9	+0.7
No Land Tax	Jean Russell	1,078	2.3	+2.3
Total formal votes		47,462	95.7	+0.3
Informal votes		2,124	4.3	−0.3
Turnout		49,586	92.1	+0.4
Two-party-preferred result
Liberal	Glenn Brookes	22,184	50.4	+0.2
Labor	Cameron Murphy	21,812	49.6	−0.2
Liberal hold		Swing	+0.2	

==== 2011 ====
2011 New South Wales state election: East Hills
Party	Candidate	Votes	%	±%
Liberal	Glenn Brookes	17,929	41.8	+14.3
Labor	Alan Ashton	17,528	40.8	−12.8
Greens	Susan Roberts	2,105	4.9	−1.2
Independent	Tony Batch	1,879	4.4	+4.4
Christian Democrats	Mark Falanga	1,771	4.1	−2.5
Family First	Stan Hurley	991	2.3	+2.3
Democratic Labor	Boutros Zalloua	715	1.7	+1.7
Total formal votes		42,918	96.0	−0.2
Informal votes		1,770	4.0	+0.2
Turnout		44,688	93.8	
Two-party-preferred result
Liberal	Glenn Brookes	19,704	50.6	+14.7
Labor	Alan Ashton	19,210	49.4	−14.7
Liberal gain from Labor		Swing	+14.7	

=== Elections in the 2000s ===
==== 2007 ====
2007 New South Wales state election: East Hills
Party	Candidate	Votes	%	±%
Labor	Alan Ashton	22,190	53.6	−1.6
Liberal	Glenn Brookes	11,352	27.4	+2.7
Christian Democrats	Stephen Chavura	2,724	6.6	+2.7
Greens	Michael Tierney	2,538	6.1	+0.1
Against Further Immigration	Francis Dale	1,472	3.6	+2.1
Unity	Andy Truong	1,109	2.7	+0.9
Total formal votes		41,385	96.2	−0.6
Informal votes		1,622	3.8	+0.6
Turnout		43,007	94.2	
Two-party-preferred result
Labor	Alan Ashton	23,921	64.1	−3.8
Liberal	Glenn Brookes	13,417	35.9	+3.8
Labor hold		Swing	−3.8	

==== 2003 ====
2003 New South Wales state election: East Hills
Party	Candidate	Votes	%	±%
Labor	Alan Ashton	22,367	55.2	+6.0
Liberal	Glenn Brookes	9,606	23.7	+4.3
Greens	Sonya McKay	2,570	6.3	+4.1
Christian Democrats	Karen Reid	1,796	4.4	+4.4
One Nation	Mark Potter	1,633	4.0	−6.7
Independent	Alan Cronin	789	1.9	+1.9
Against Further Immigration	Howard Dakin	740	1.8	−1.5
Unity	Stanley Xie	698	1.7	+1.7
Democrats	Nabil Dabbagh	357	0.9	−1.6
Total formal votes		40,556	96.6	+0.0
Informal votes		1,429	3.4	−0.0
Turnout		41,985	94.2	
Two-party-preferred result
Labor	Alan Ashton	24,441	68.5	+0.2
Liberal	Glenn Brookes	11,221	31.5	−0.2
Labor hold		Swing	+0.2	

=== Elections in the 1990s ===
==== 1999 ====
1999 New South Wales state election: East Hills
Party	Candidate	Votes	%	±%
Labor	Alan Ashton	20,146	49.2	−3.1
Liberal	Nick Korovin	7,926	19.4	−8.7
One Nation	Kay Bounds	4,369	10.7	+10.7
Independent	Max Parker	4,263	10.4	−1.5
Against Further Immigration	John Moffat	1,369	3.3	−2.2
Democrats	Jeff Meikle	1,003	2.5	+1.5
Greens	Colin Charlton	919	2.2	+2.2
Independent	Dean Carver	554	1.4	+1.4
Earthsave	Marie Coppolaro	358	0.9	+0.9
Total formal votes		40,907	96.6	+1.8
Informal votes		1,444	3.4	−1.8
Turnout		42,351	94.5	
Two-party-preferred result
Labor	Alan Ashton	22,862	68.3	+6.7
Liberal	Nick Korovin	10,610	31.7	−6.7
Labor hold		Swing	+6.7	

==== 1995 ====
1995 New South Wales state election: East Hills
Party	Candidate	Votes	%	±%
Labor	Pat Rogan	16,732	49.6	−4.5
Liberal	David Sparkes	8,964	26.6	−9.5
Independent	Max Parker	5,284	15.7	+15.7
Against Further Immigration	John Moffat	2,460	7.3	+7.3
Natural Law	Ann Hughes	269	0.8	+0.8
Total formal votes		33,709	95.3	+4.8
Informal votes		1,665	4.7	−4.8
Turnout		35,374	95.9	
Two-party-preferred result
Labor	Pat Rogan	19,039	60.7	+1.9
Liberal	David Sparkes	12,342	39.3	−1.9
Labor hold		Swing	+1.9	

==== 1991 ====
1991 New South Wales state election: East Hills
Party	Candidate	Votes	%	±%
Labor	Pat Rogan	17,257	54.1	−1.1
Liberal	Max Parker	11,518	36.1	−5.1
Independent	David Sparkes	2,105	6.6	+6.6
Democrats	Robert Springett	993	3.1	+3.1
Total formal votes		31,873	90.5	−6.1
Informal votes		3,363	9.5	+6.1
Turnout		35,236	95.4	
Two-party-preferred result
Labor	Pat Rogan	18,242	58.7	+1.7
Liberal	Max Parker	12,809	41.3	−1.7
Labor hold		Swing	+1.7	

=== Elections in the 1980s ===
==== 1988 ====
1988 New South Wales state election: East Hills
Party	Candidate	Votes	%	±%
Labor	Pat Rogan	16,747	57.4	−5.4
Liberal	Peter Carver	12,425	42.6	+11.6
Total formal votes		29,172	96.4	−1.2
Informal votes		1,093	3.6	+1.2
Turnout		30,265	96.2	
Labor hold		Swing	−8.6	

==== 1984 ====
1984 New South Wales state election: East Hills
Party	Candidate	Votes	%	±%
Labor	Pat Rogan	19,206	62.8	−6.1
Liberal	Max Parker	9,477	31.0	+9.1
Democrats	Margaret Vitlin	1,879	6.2	−3.1
Total formal votes		30,562	97.6	+0.8
Informal votes		749	2.4	−0.8
Turnout		31,311	95.1	+1.1
Two-party-preferred result
Labor	Pat Rogan		66.0	−9.8
Liberal	Max Parker		34.0	+9.8
Labor hold		Swing	−9.8	

==== 1981 ====
1981 New South Wales state election: East Hills
Party	Candidate	Votes	%	±%
Labor	Pat Rogan	20,656	68.9	−4.3
Liberal	Paul Brazier	6,570	21.9	−0.1
Democrats	Margaret Vitlin	2,777	9.3	+4.5
Total formal votes		30,003	96.8	
Informal votes		975	3.2	
Turnout		30,978	94.0	
Two-party-preferred result
Labor	Pat Rogan	21,156	74.9	−0.7
Liberal	Paul Brazier	7,090	25.1	+0.7
Labor hold		Swing	−0.7	

=== Elections in the 1970s ===
==== 1978 ====
1978 New South Wales state election: East Hills
Party	Candidate	Votes	%	±%
Labor	Pat Rogan	22,645	73.2	+8.4
Liberal	Nefra Clarke	6,793	22.0	−13.2
Democrats	Paul Terrett	1,479	4.8	+4.8
Total formal votes		30,917	98.3	0.0
Informal votes		545	1.7	0.0
Turnout		31,462	94.8	−0.1
Two-party-preferred result
Labor	Pat Rogan	23,385	75.6	+10.8
Liberal	Nefra Clarke	7,532	24.4	−10.8
Labor hold		Swing	+10.8	

==== 1976 ====
1976 New South Wales state election: East Hills
Party	Candidate	Votes	%	±%
Labor	Pat Rogan	20,095	64.8	+10.4
Liberal	George Edgell	10,905	35.2	+2.4
Total formal votes		31,000	98.3	+0.5
Informal votes		521	1.7	−0.5
Turnout		31,521	95.0	−0.4
Labor hold		Swing	+3.7	

==== 1973 ====
1973 New South Wales state election: East Hills
Party	Candidate	Votes	%	±%
Labor	Pat Rogan	16,337	54.4	−2.5
Liberal	John Edwards	9,842	32.8	+11.5
Australia	Robert Walsh	2,165	7.2	+7.2
Democratic Labor	John Anderson	1,664	5.6	+5.6
Total formal votes		30,008	97.8	
Informal votes		659	2.2	
Turnout		30,667	95.4	
Two-party-preferred result
Labor	Pat Rogan	18,337	61.1	−2.3
Liberal	John Edwards	11,671	38.9	+2.3
Labor hold		Swing	−2.3	

==== 1971 ====
1971 New South Wales state election: East Hills
Party	Candidate	Votes	%	±%
Labor	Joe Kelly	17,021	56.9	+4.4
Liberal	Albert Hurley	6,387	21.3	−2.9
Independent	Harold McIlveen	3,942	13.2	−10.1
Independent	Raymond Buchanan	2,572	8.6	+8.6
Total formal votes		29,922	98.0	
Informal votes		605	2.0	
Turnout		30,527	95.7	
Two-party-preferred result
Labor	Joe Kelly	18,976	63.4	+4.0
Liberal	Albert Hurley	10,946	36.6	−4.0
Labor hold		Swing	+4.0	

=== Elections in the 1960s ===
==== 1968 ====
1968 New South Wales state election: East Hills
Party	Candidate	Votes	%	±%
Labor	Joe Kelly	14,625	52.5	−0.8
Liberal	John Colley	6,758	24.2	−4.8
Independent	Harold McIlveen	6,502	23.3	+11.6
Total formal votes		27,885	97.8	
Informal votes		632	2.2	
Turnout		28,517	95.9	
Two-party-preferred result
Labor	Joe Kelly	16,576	59.4	+0.7
Liberal	John Colley	11,309	40.6	−0.7
Labor hold		Swing	+0.7	

==== 1965 ====
1965 New South Wales state election: East Hills
Party	Candidate	Votes	%	±%
Labor	Joe Kelly	14,036	53.3	−13.5
Liberal	John Colley	7,621	29.0	−4.2
Independent	Harold McIlveen	3,089	11.7	+11.7
Independent	Russell Duncan	989	3.8	+3.8
Independent	Jack Mingramm	320	1.2	+1.2
Independent	Norman Weeks	259	1.0	+1.0
Total formal votes		26,314	97.1	−1.2
Informal votes		785	2.9	+1.2
Turnout		27,099	96.2	+0.9
Two-party-preferred result
Labor	Joe Kelly	15,434	58.7	−8.1
Liberal	John Colley	10,880	41.3	+8.1
Labor hold		Swing	−8.1	

==== 1962 ====
1962 New South Wales state election: East Hills
Party	Candidate	Votes	%	±%
Labor	Joe Kelly	16,005	66.8	+2.1
Liberal	Keith Batten	7,949	33.2	+6.8
Total formal votes		23,954	98.3	
Informal votes		407	1.7	
Turnout		24,361	95.3	
Labor hold		Swing	−0.6	

=== Elections in the 1950s ===
==== 1959 ====
1959 New South Wales state election: East Hills
Party	Candidate	Votes	%	±%
Labor	Joe Kelly	16,578	64.7	
Liberal	Allan Young	6,768	26.4	
Independent	John Bennett	2,269	8.9	
Total formal votes		25,615	98.1	
Informal votes		498	1.9	
Turnout		26,113	95.5	
Two-party-preferred result
Labor	Joe Kelly	17,259	67.4	
Liberal	Allan Young	8,356	32.6	
Labor hold		Swing		

==== 1956 ====
1956 New South Wales state election: East Hills
Party	Candidate	Votes	%	±%
Labor	Joe Kelly	16,897	56.0	−13.9
Liberal	Harold Stalker	10,515	34.9	+4.8
Independent	Douglas Marshall	2,740	9.1	+9.1
Total formal votes		30,152	97.9	0.0
Informal votes		656	2.1	0.0
Turnout		30,808	93.8	−0.2
Two-party-preferred result
Labor	Joe Kelly	18,267	60.6	−9.3
Liberal	Harold Stalker	11,885	39.4	+9.3
Labor hold		Swing	−9.3	

==== 1953 ====
1953 New South Wales state election: East Hills
Party	Candidate	Votes	%	±%
Labor	Arthur Williams	16,018	69.9	
Liberal	Armand Macquart	6,891	30.1	
Total formal votes		22,909	97.9	
Informal votes		489	2.1	
Turnout		23,398	94.0	
Labor notional hold		Swing	N/A	
