= Bankstown Aerodrome, New South Wales =

Bankstown Aerodrome
- Suburb
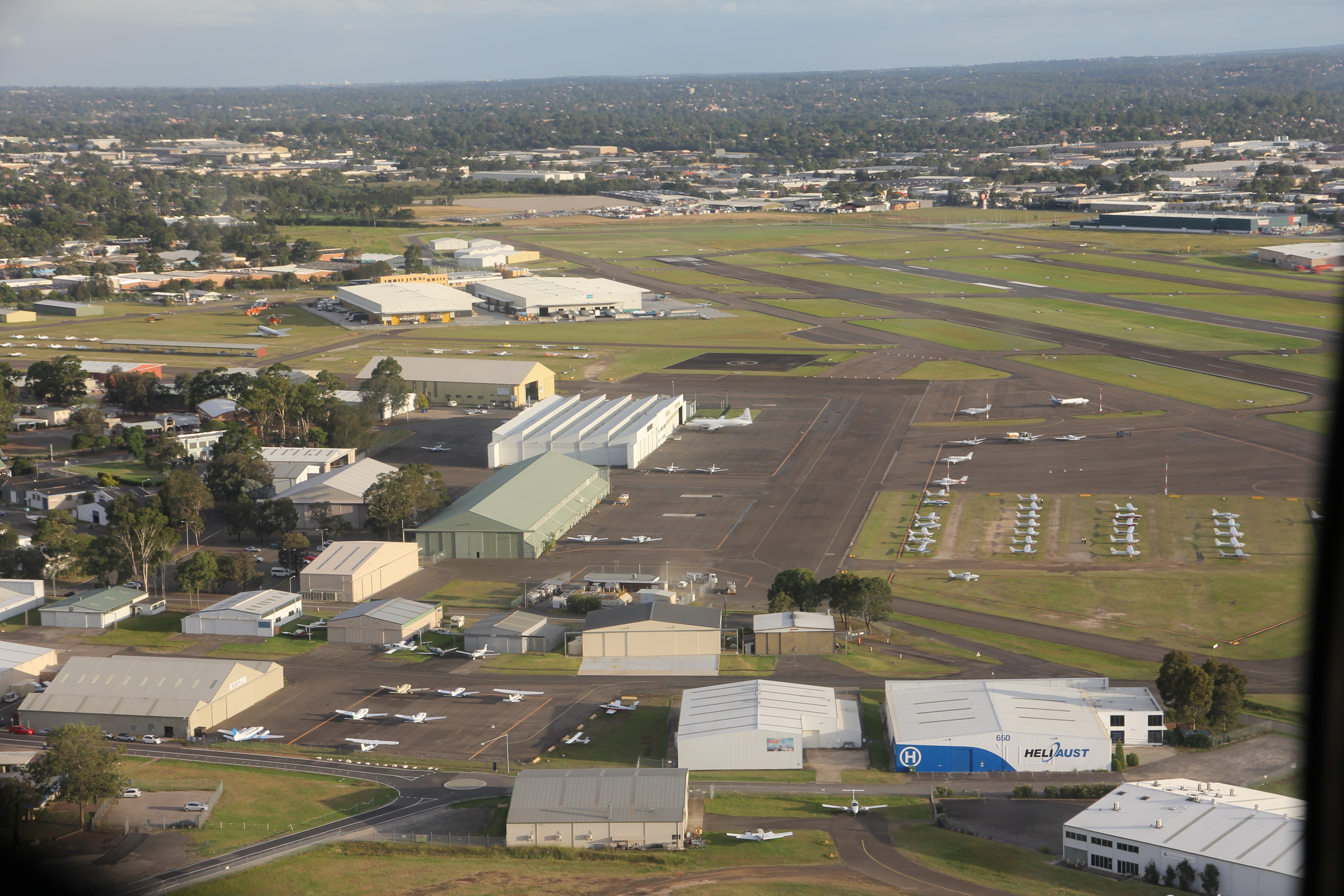
- Aerial view of Bankstown Aerodrome

- Interactive map of Bankstown Aerodrome
- Coordinates: 33°55′S 150°59′E
- Country: Australia
- State: New South Wales
- City: Bankstown
- LGA: City of Canterbury-Bankstown
- Location: 24 km (15 mi) SW of Sydney CBD
- Established: 1994

Government
  - State electorate: East Hills
  - Federal division: Watson
- Elevation: 6 m (20 ft)

Population
  - Total: 5 (2021 census)
- Postcode: 2200
Suburbs around Bankstown Aerodrome
Lansvale	Georges Hall	Yagoona
Chipping Norton	Bankstown Aerodrome	Condell Park
Moorebank	Milperra	Revesby

Bankstown Aerodrome is a suburb south-west of Sydney, in the state of New South Wales. The suburb was gazetted in May 1994 and is the location of the Bankstown Airport. The suburb is bounded by the Georges River in the west and Condell Park in the east. In the 2021 census, Bankstown Aerodrome had a population of 5 people.
