= Milperra =

- Suburb
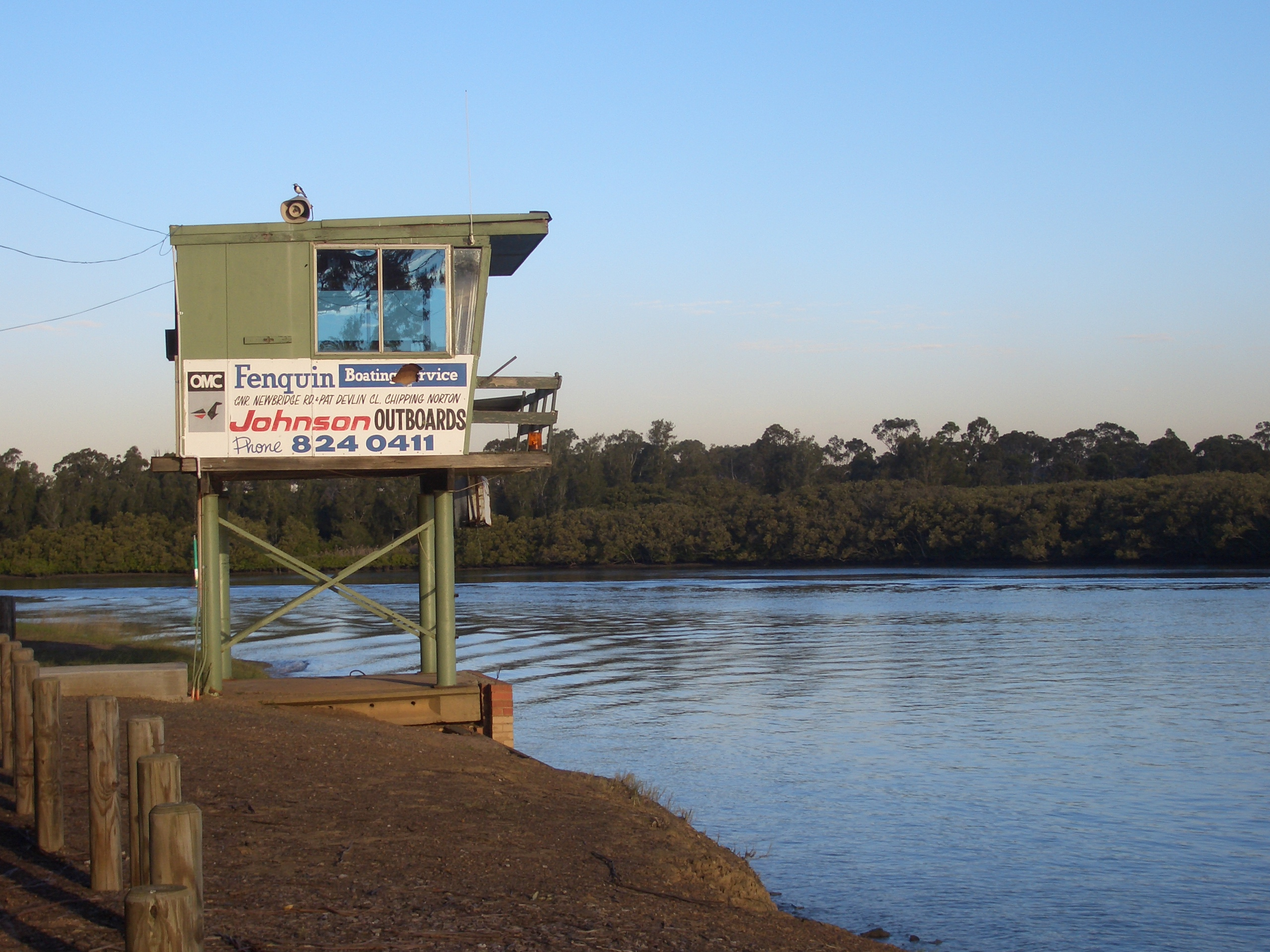
- Deepwater Park, Georges River, Milperra

- Interactive map of Milperra
- Country: Australia
- State: New South Wales
- City: Sydney
- LGA: City of Canterbury-Bankstown
- Location: 24 km (15 mi) south-west of Sydney CBD

Government
  - State electorate: East Hills
  - Federal division: Banks
- Elevation: 11 m (36 ft)

Population
  - Total: 4,074 (2021 census)
- Postcode: 2214
Suburbs around Milperra
Picnic Point	Bankstown Aerodrome	Condell Park
Padstow	Milperra	Revesby
Revesby Heights	Voyager Point	Panania

Milperra, a suburb of local government area City of Canterbury-Bankstown, is located 24 kilometres west of the Sydney central business district in the state of New South Wales, Australia, and is a part of the South Western Sydney region.

== History ==
Milperra is an Aboriginal word for a gathering of people. The land at Milperra was taken over by George Johnson Jr. After World War I, returning soldiers established poultry farms and vegetable gardens in the area. The area commonly known as Thorns Bush, became officially known as Bankstown Soldier Settlement in 1917. Many streets in the area are named after World War 1 battles and officers.

The Milperra College of Advanced Education was established in 1974, bringing tertiary education to south-western Sydney. It became the Macarthur Institute of Higher Education in 1983, and then became the Bankstown campus of Western Sydney University in 1989. The campus was closed in 2023 when the university opened its new vertical campus in the Bankstown CBD. Against the wishes of local residents, the land was controversially sold to private housing developers rather than being repurposed for much needed local services like a high school, where some of the infrastructure could have been reused.

In September 1984, on Father's Day, members of rival motorbike gangs the Comanchero and the Bandidos had a showdown in the car park of the Milperra Viking Tavern, which is technically located in Revesby. This altercation has since been called the 'Milperra Massacre'. Six bikies (bikers) and a 14-year-old girl were killed.

== Parks ==
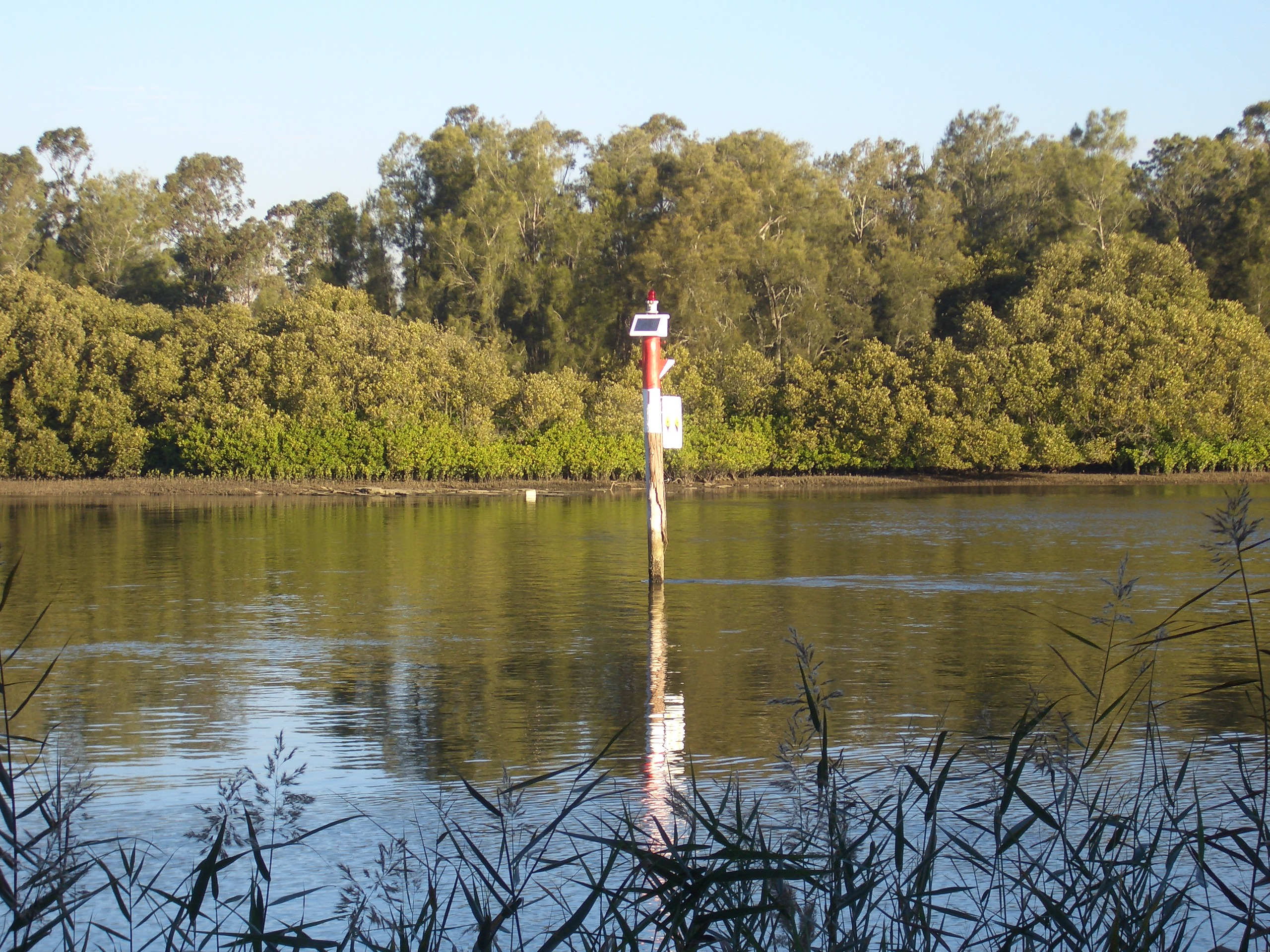
Deepwater Park, Georges River

Milperra sits on the bank of the Georges River and features a number of parks and reserves along the river, including Deepwater Park, Bankstown Golf Course and Vale of Ah Reserve.

== Schools ==
Milperra is also home to Mount Saint Joseph, Milperra, an all-girls private catholic high school with grades 7–12.

Milperra Public School is primary school located on Pozieres Avenue.

== Commercial areas ==
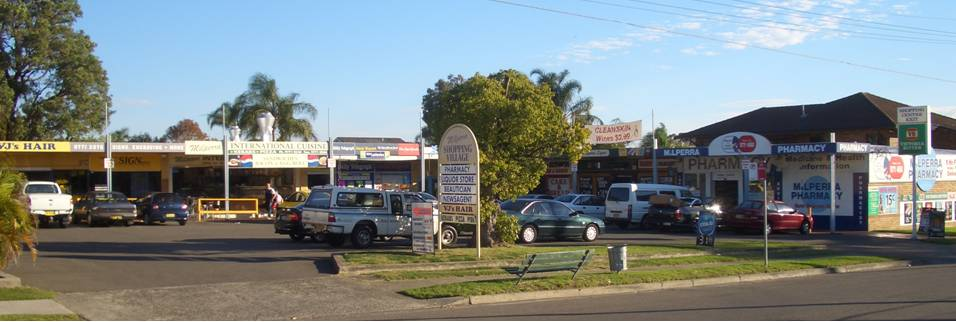
Milperra Shopping Village

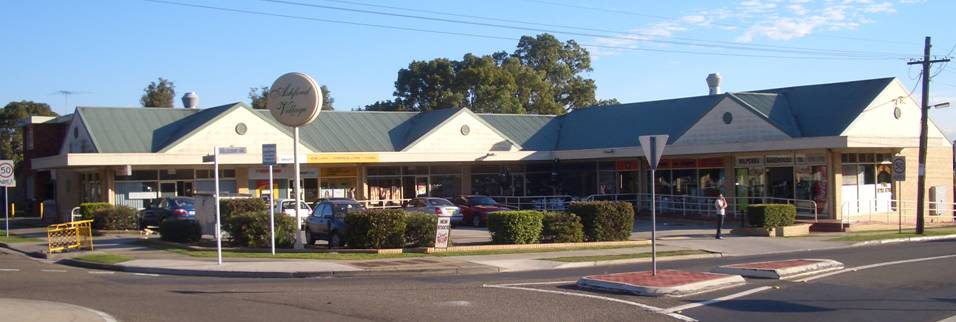
Ashford Village

Milperra features a mixture of residential, commercial and industrial areas. A number of small retail strips are scattered throughout the suburb including Milperra Shopping Village on Bullecourt Avenue and Ashford Village on the corner of Bullecourt Avenue and Ashford Avenue. Another small group of shops is located on the corner of Pozieres Avenue and Amiens Avenue, opposite the public school and many commercial developments are situated along Milperra Road.

== Transport ==
Milperra Road is a major road on the northern border which links to Newbridge Road and Moorebank, on the western side of the Milperra Bridge, over the Georges River. The M5 South Western Motorway runs along the southern border and Henry Lawson Drive is the other major road through the area.

== Notable residents ==
- Robyn Denholm (born 1963), chair of Tesla, Inc., born and grew up in Milperra
- Daniel Sams (born 1992), cricketer, born and grew up in Milperra
- Ian Thorpe (born 1982), swimmer, grew up in Milperra
