= PDW =

PDW may refer to:

- Personal defense weapon, a class of submachine gun-like firearms designed to fire rifle cartridges
- PDW, the National Rail station code for Paddock Wood railway station, Kent, England
- PDW, the Sydney Trains station code for Padstow railway station, Sydney, New South Wales, Australia
