= Revesby, New South Wales =

Revesby
- Suburb
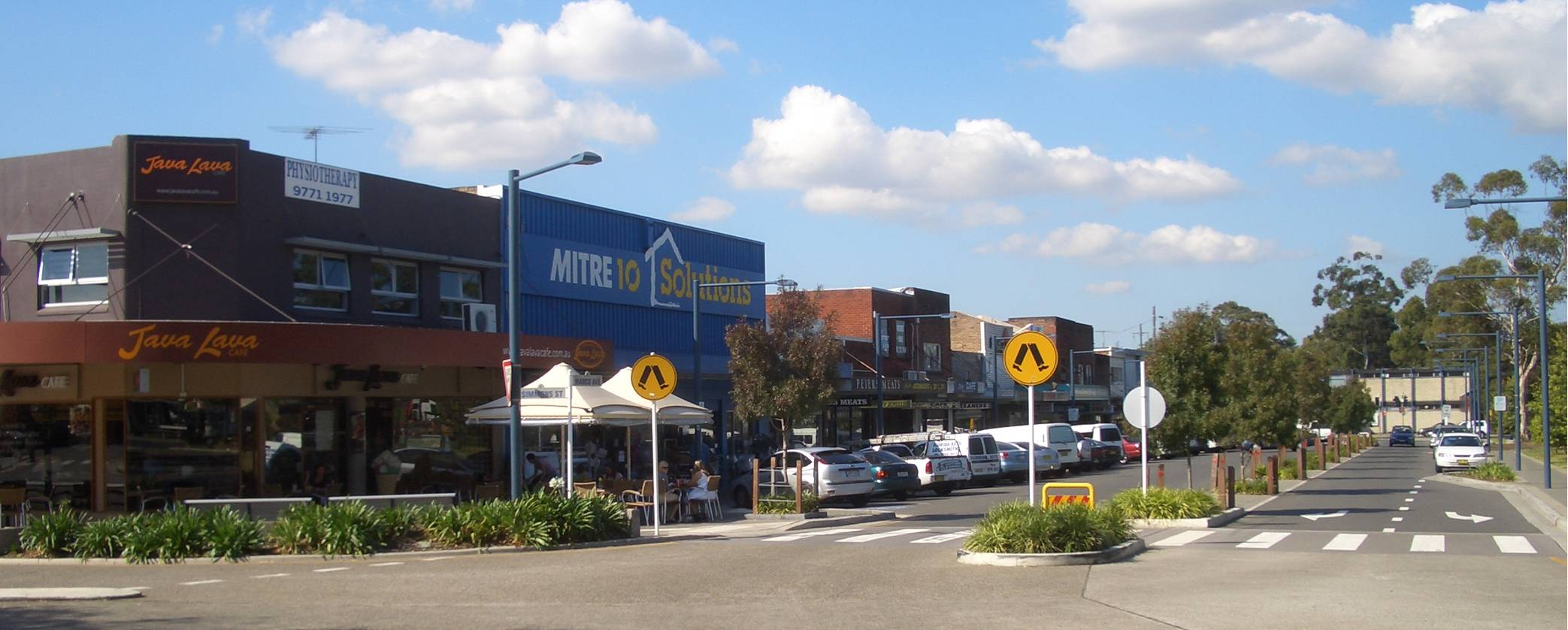
- Marco Avenue, near The River Road

- Interactive map of Revesby
- Coordinates: 33°57′0″S 151°0′37″E
- Country: Australia
- State: New South Wales
- City: Sydney
- LGA: City of Canterbury-Bankstown
- Location: 22 km (14 mi) south-west of Sydney CBD

Government
  - State electorate: East Hills
  - Federal division: Banks
- Elevation: 14 m (46 ft)

Population
  - Total: 15,268 (2021 census)
- Postcode: 2212
Suburbs around Revesby
Milperra	Condell Park	Bankstown
Panania	Revesby	Padstow
Picnic Point	Revesby Heights	Padstow Heights

Revesby is a suburb in South-western Sydney, in the state of New South Wales, Australia. It is part of the local government area of City of Canterbury-Bankstown and is located 22 kilometres south-west of the Sydney central business district.

Revesby is mostly a residential suburb, which was developed as part of Sydney's post-war urban sprawl, and contains many modest freestanding bungalows built from asbestos cement sheeting (fibro). Revesby is bounded on the north by Canterbury Road and the suburbs of Bankstown and Condell Park, on the south by Revesby Heights and Picnic Point, on the Georges River, on the west by Panania, and on the east by Padstow.

== History ==
Revesby was named in 1913 in honour of Sir Joseph Banks, the botanist who sailed with Captain James Cook on the Endeavour, when he reached the east coast of Australia in 1770. Banks had inherited his father's estate of Revesby Abbey, in Lincolnshire, England, so he was known as the Squire of Revesby. He is also commemorated in the Sir Joseph Banks High School in Turvey Street.

George Johnston, an officer of marines who had arrived on the First Fleet was granted land in this area in 1804. His wife Esther Julian, who had arrived as a convict on the same ship in 1788 was granted 570 acres (230 ha) on 1 November 1813. That part of Julian's 570 acres south of Milperra Road between The River Road and Queen Street down to Bransgrove Road was subdivided in 1889 into 707 lots to land, each about a quarter of an acre (1,011 m^{2} (10,880 sq ft)). It was known as the Beaconsfield Estate. <Deposited Plan 2343>

The earliest landowners did not reside in the area. The only mansion built in the early days was 'The Pah' on Tompson Road. It was built in 1896-1897 by Samuel John Hales on 14 acres (5.7 ha) that had been purchased from the Weston estate. That property was subdivided in 1926 but the house remains (as at 2025).

The first school opened as Bankstown South in 1896; now known as Revesby Public School. The railway station opened on 21 December 1931. The local post office opened in 1955.

The establishment of Revesby railway station in 1931 allowed for easier access to the suburban areas, making Revesby a more attractive place for residents and businesses. Revesby was still seen as a location for people seeking a more rural lifestyle while remaining within reasonable distance to the Sydney CBD.

== Demographics ==
According to the 2021 census of Population, there were 15,268 people in Revesby. More recent estimates from areasearch.com.au say 16,877 as of August 2026.

- 55.5% of people were born in Australia. The next most common countries of birth were China 5.4%, Vietnam 5.2%, Lebanon 3.5%, India 2.5% and New Zealand 1.8%.
- 45.9% of people spoke only English at home. Other languages spoken at home included Arabic 11.6%, Vietnamese 6.9%, Mandarin 5.4%, Cantonese 4.0% and Greek 3.0%.
- The most common responses for religion were Catholic 24.8%, No Religion 22.1%, Islam 11.2% and Anglican 7.1%.

== Commercial area ==
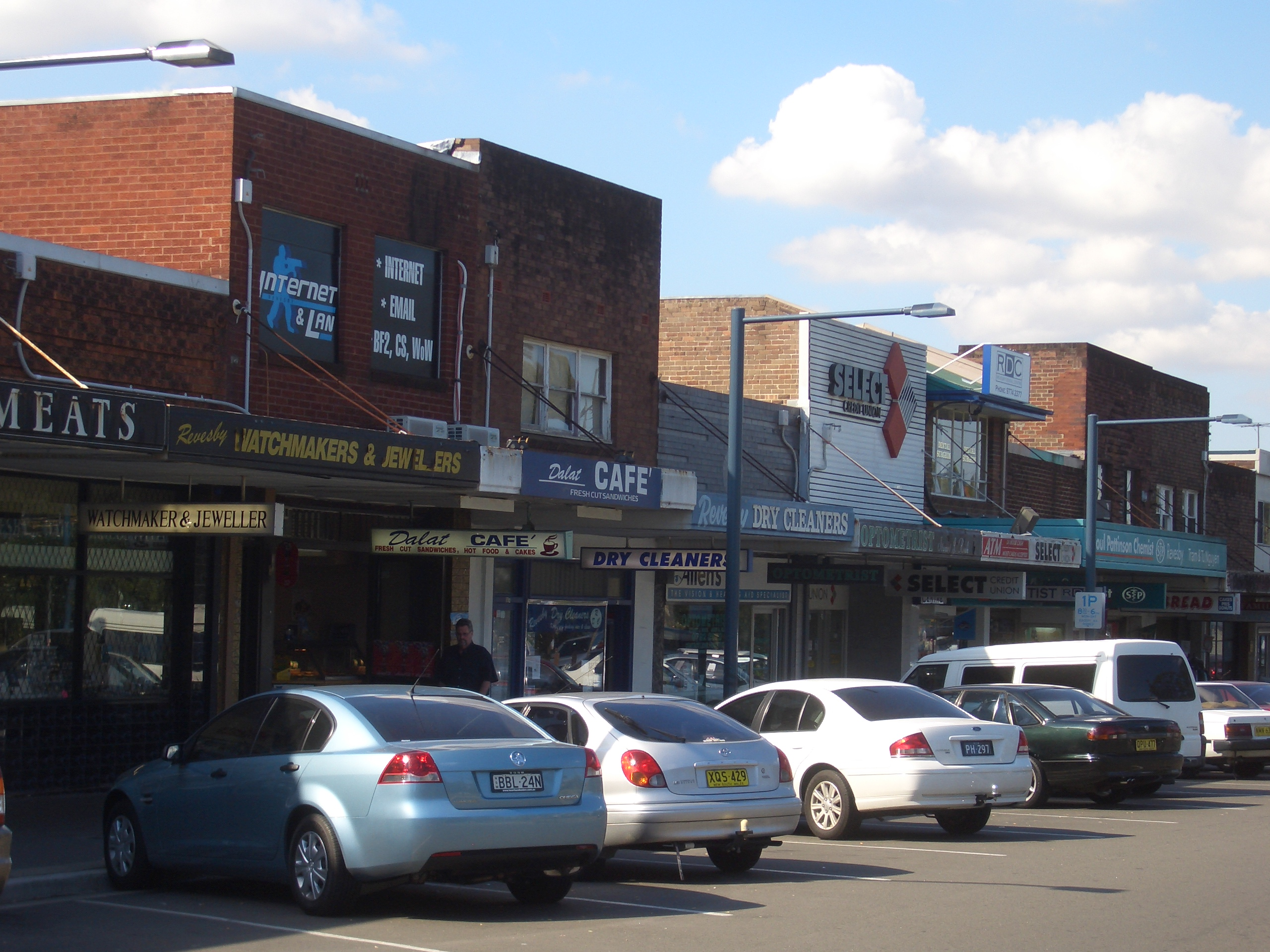
Marco Avenue, looking east from Simmons Street

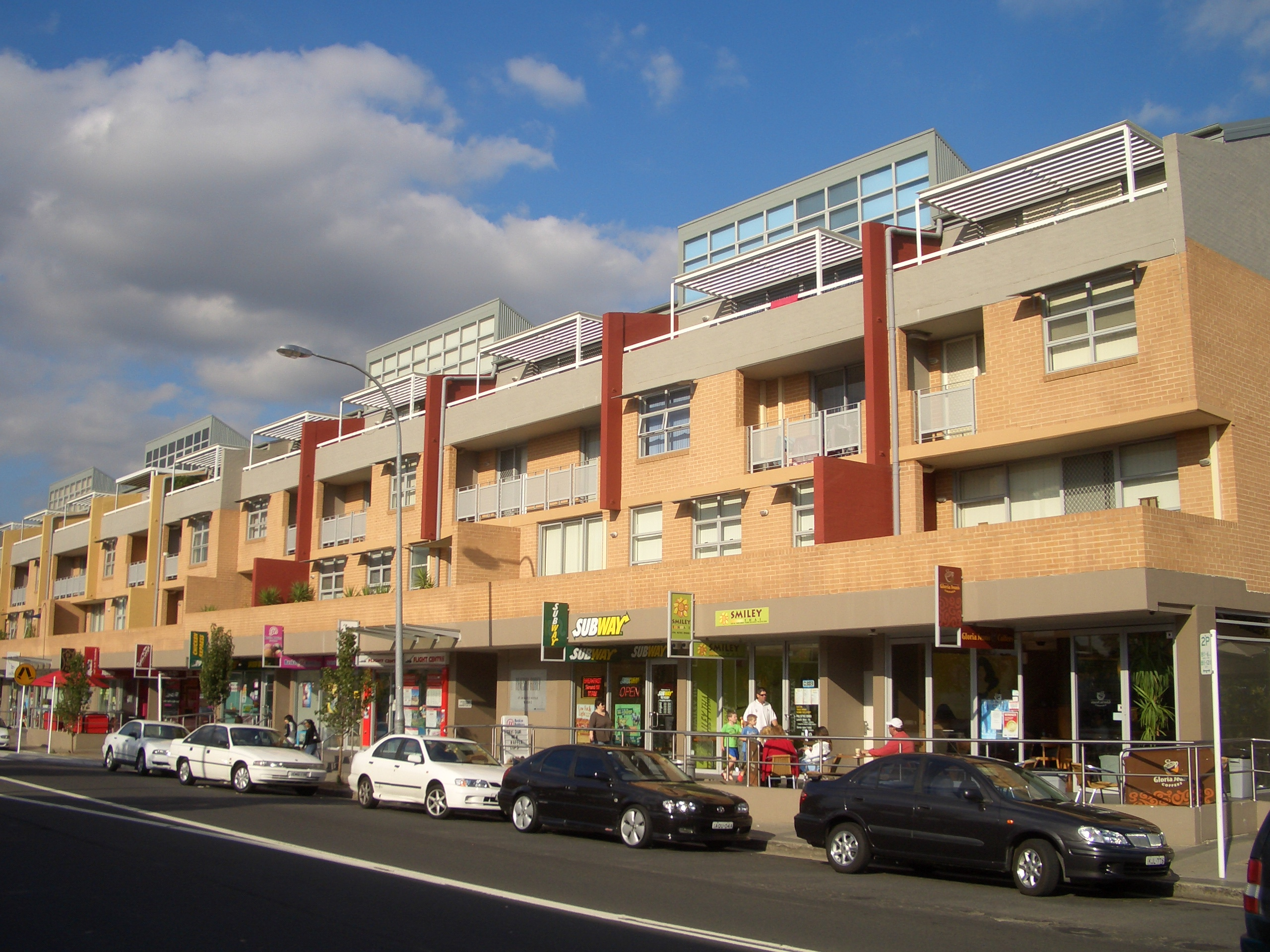
Revesby Abbey, Marco Avenue

Revesby has a growing retail shopping centre, adjacent to Revesby railway station, centred on Marco Avenue and Selems Parade. It is also the site of several local government facilities including a senior citizens centre.

The Revesby shopping village is home to many banks, specialty retailers, restaurants and cafés. In the early 2000s, one of the largest Woolworths supermarkets in Sydney was built in Marco Avenue, across the road from the existing complex. On the original site, a combined residential and retail development called Revesby Abbey was completed in 2003. These developments brought a major increase in shoppers and business to the area. Revesby Abbey is now a popular spot for people to meet as it features many cafes, restaurants and boutiques lining the street.

== Culture and entertainment ==
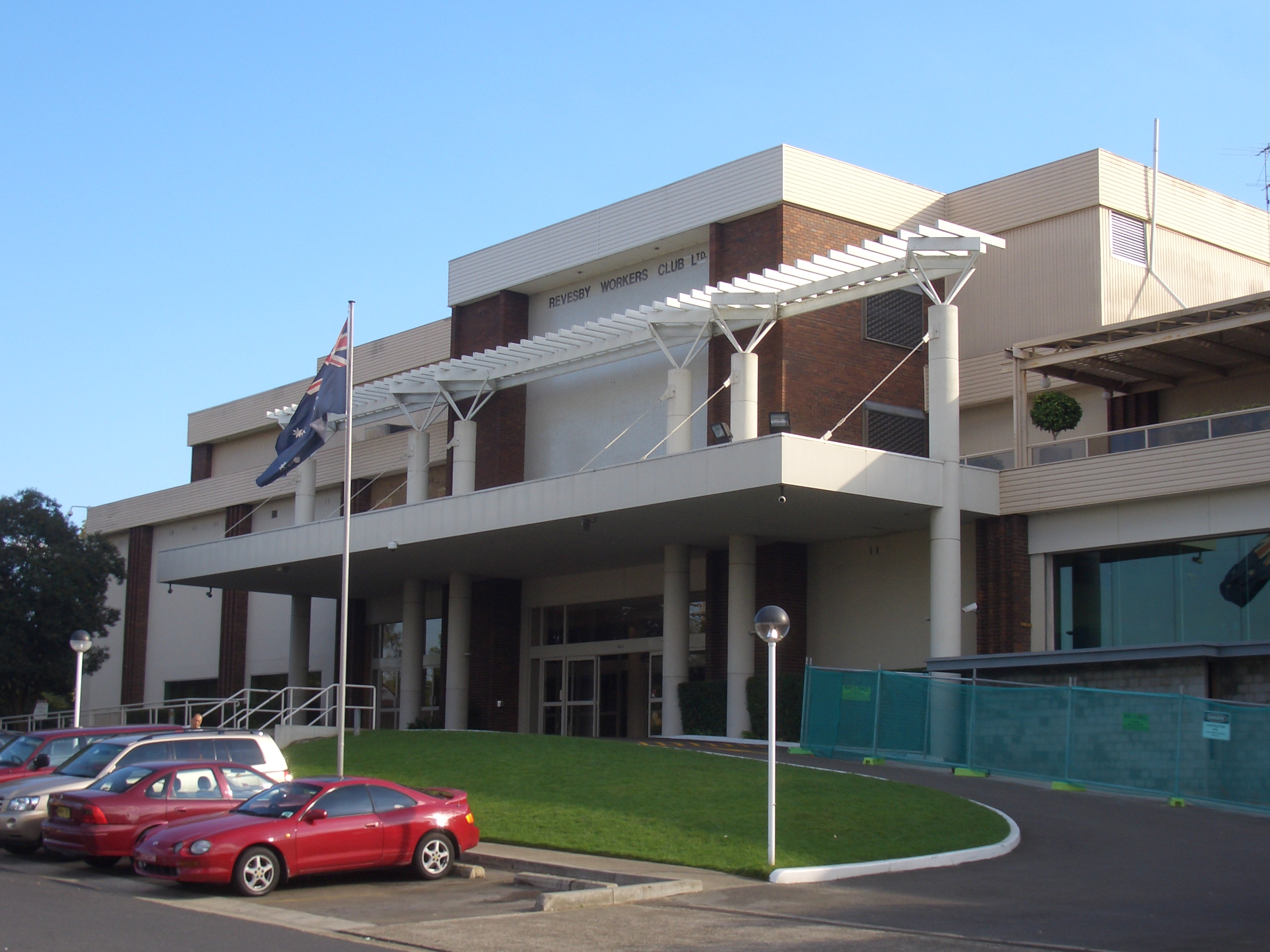
Revesby Workers Club

A major attraction of Revesby is the Revesby Workers' Club. Originally opened in 1962, today it has over 50,000 members, with extensive modern facilities. The most recent upgrades were completed in 2000, with further extensions currently under construction expected to significantly change the club, making it one of the largest in the state. The 2023 extension of a multi-level car park as well as another supermarket in close proximity has greatly increased access for locals for entertainment and products.

An Arts and Crafts Fair is held every month at Abel Reserve.

== Transport ==
Revesby railway station is on the East Hills railway line. During the morning and afternoon peak, express services run via Sydenham and Redfern.

Revesby is serviced by buses operated by U-Go Mobility, generally following the routes established by McVicar's Bus Services:

Route	From	To	Via	Ref
922	East Hills	Bankstown	Milperra	
923	Panania	Bankstown	Picnic Point	
924	East Hills	Bankstown	Panania	
925	East Hills	Lidcombe	Bankstown	
926	Revesby Heights	Bankstown		

== Education ==
- Revesby Public School
- Revesby South Public School
- Sir Joseph Banks High School
- St Lukes Catholic Primary School
- Broderick Gillawarna School
- De La Salle College

== Politics ==
For federal elections, Revesby is in the federal electoral division of Banks, currently held by Zhi Soon for the Australian Labor Party.

For NSW state elections, Revesby is predominantly in the state electoral district of East Hills. The seat is currently held by Labor's Kylie Wilkinson.

== Sport ==
- Revesby Workers Football Club is based at Marco Reserve
- Revesby Rover's Football Soccer Club Inc. is based at Amour Park
- St Christopher's Soccer Club is based at Marco Reserve
- St Christopher's Junior Rugby League Club, part of the Canterbury-Bankstown District Junior Rugby League. It has produced such players as Brent Sherwin, Graeme Hughes, Corey Hughes, Jarrad Hickey and Mark Riddell.
- Revesby Skate Park
- Max Parker Leisure & Aquatic Centre
- Revesby Workers Cricket Club
- St Christopher's Cricket Club
- Panania Cricket Club, it has produced players such as Steve Waugh and Mark Waugh

== Notable residents ==
The following people live, or have lived, in Revesby.

- Pat Clancy, trade union leader (1919–1987)
- Eric Cox, rugby league administrator (1923–2006)
- Lisa Jackson Pulver, epidemiologist (born 1959)
- Johnny Raper, rugby league player (1939–2022)
- Maurie Raper, rugby league player
- Sean Russo, paralympian (born 1991)
