= Wendy Lindsay =

Australian politician

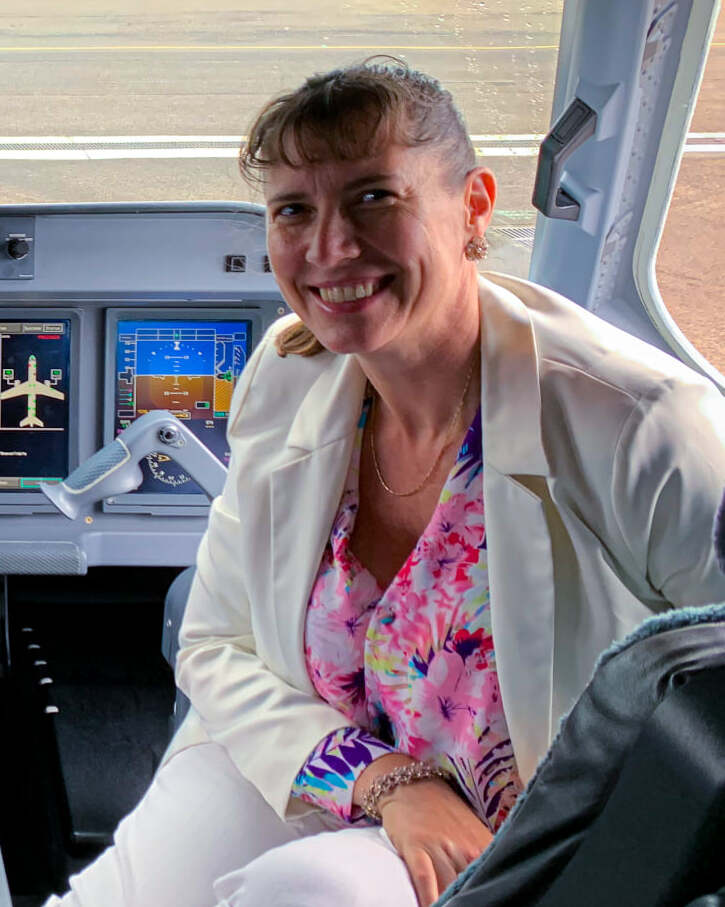

Member of the New South Wales Parliament for East Hills
- In office 23 March 2019 – 3 March 2023
- Preceded by: Glenn Brookes
- Succeeded by: Kylie Wilkinson

Personal details
- Born: 31 July Padstow
- Party: Liberal
- Spouse: John
- Children: Lori, Ruby
- Occupation: Manager of Community Radio Station

Wendy Elizabeth Lindsay is an Australian politician serving as a councillor representing the Revesby Ward of the City of Canterbury Bankstown. She was a member of the New South Wales Legislative Assembly from 2019 to 2023, representing East Hills for the Liberal Party.

== Political career ==
Prior to being elected to parliament, Lindsay was the manager of the multilingual Bankstown Auburn Community radio station.

In August 2018, the then-incumbent member for East Hills, Glenn Brookes, who had resigned from the Liberal Party in 2016 after his campaign manager was charged with electoral offences, announced that he would retire from parliament. Lindsay was preselected by the Liberal Party to contest the seat. She was elected, narrowly defeating Labor candidate Cameron Murphy.

Lindsay was defeated by Kylie Wilkinson at the 2023 state election, having served one term.

Wendy Lindsay was elected as a councillor for the Revesby Ward on the City of Canterbury Bankstown Council during the local government elections held on 14 September 2024. This ward includes suburbs such as East Hills, Milperra, Padstow, Padstow Heights, Panania, Picnic Point, Revesby and Revesby Heights.

In October 2024, Lindsay expressed concerns regarding the proposed demerger of the Canterbury-Bankstown Council. While acknowledging the challenges posed by the council's growing population, she highlighted the significant expenses involved in reversing the merger and suggested that such a process would be complex and unlikely to occur in the current term.

New South Wales Legislative Assembly
Preceded by Glenn Brookes	Member for East Hills; 2019–2023	Succeeded by Kylie Wilkinson
