= Padstow railway station =

Padstow railway station may refer to:

- Padstow railway station (England) in Cornwall, England
- Padstow railway station, Sydney in Australia
