= Padstow Heights =

- Suburb
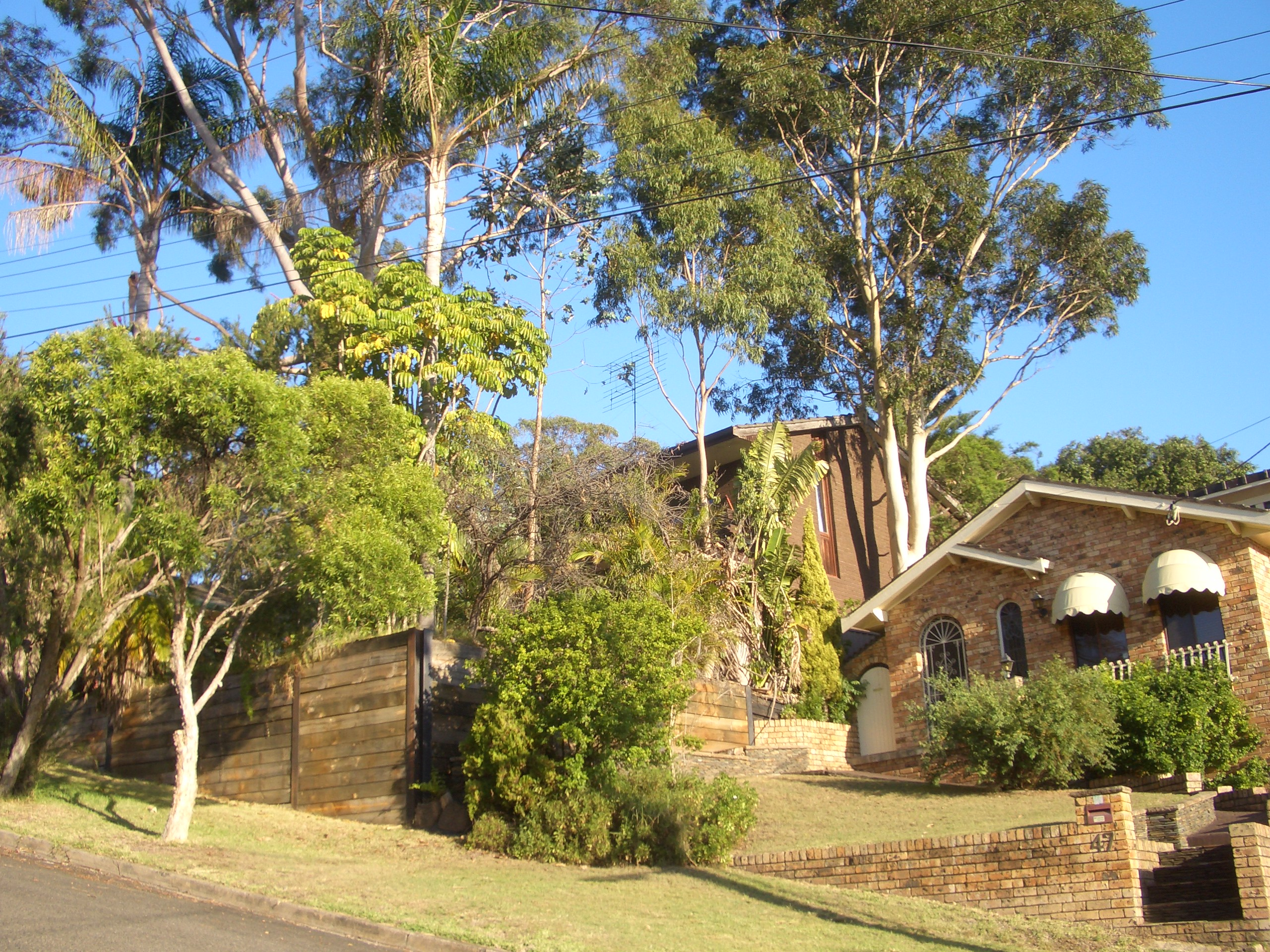
- Henry Kendall Avenue, Padstow Heights

- Interactive map of Padstow Heights
- Country: Australia
- State: New South Wales
- City: Sydney
- LGA: City of Canterbury-Bankstown
- Location: 22 km (14 mi) south-west of Sydney central business district

Government
  - State electorate: East Hills
  - Federal division: Banks
- Elevation: 47 m (154 ft)

Population
  - Total: 3,594 (2021 census)
- Postcode: 2211
Suburbs around Padstow Heights
Revesby	Padstow	Peakhurst
Revesby Heights	Padstow Heights	Riverwood
Picnic Point	Alfords Point	Lugarno

Padstow Heights is a suburb in South-western Sydney in the state of New South Wales, Australia. It is in the local government area of the City of Canterbury-Bankstown, and located 22 kilometres south-west of the Sydney central business district. Padstow is a separate suburb to the north and One Tree Point is a locality within Padstow Heights.

== Geography ==
Padstow Heights is a mostly residential suburb bounded on the east by Salt Pan Creek and to the south by the Georges River. The Alfords Point Bridge links Padstow Heights to Alfords Point in the Sutherland Shire.

== Transport ==
U-Go Mobility bus route 927 from One Tree Point to Padstow railway station serves Padstow Heights.

== History ==
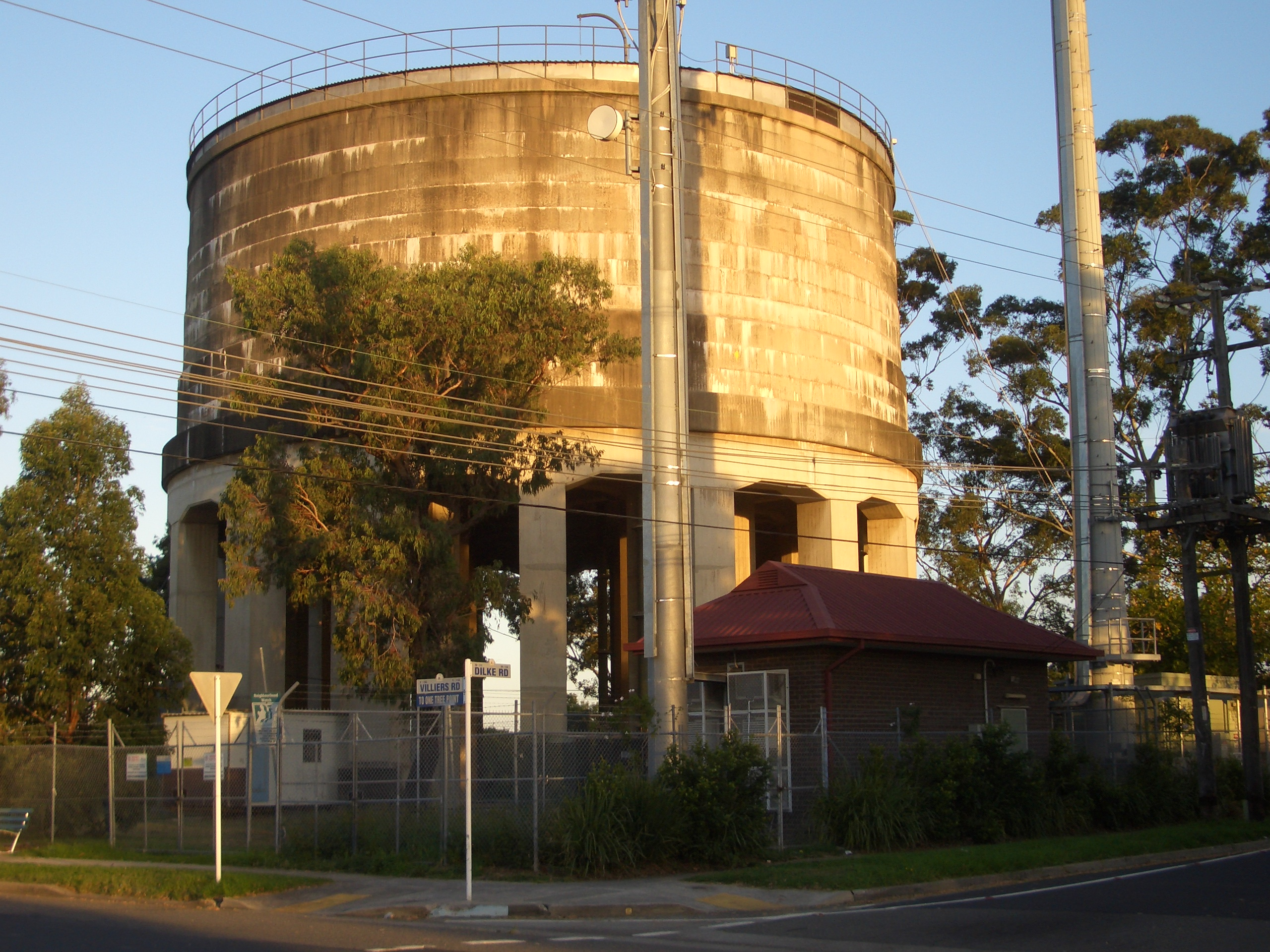
Padstow Heights Reservoir, built in 1935

The Padstow area was first named Padstow Park Estate after a town called Padstow in Cornwall, England. It was named for being the "holy place of St Petrock" (not to be confused with St Patrick), an important Cornish saint.

== Population ==
As per the 2021 Census, there were 3,594 people in Padstow Heights. 73.4% of people were born in Australia and 71.1% of people spoke only English at home. Other languages spoken at home included Greek 5.0% and Arabic 4.8%. The most common responses for religion were Catholic 28.7%, No Religion 20.6%, Anglican 14.2% and Eastern Orthodox 11.7%.

== Notable residents ==
- Jason Clare – Member for Blaxland in the federal parliament is currently living in Padstow Heights.
- Roger Rogerson – former detective-sergeant of the New South Wales Police Force
