= Condell Park =

- Suburb
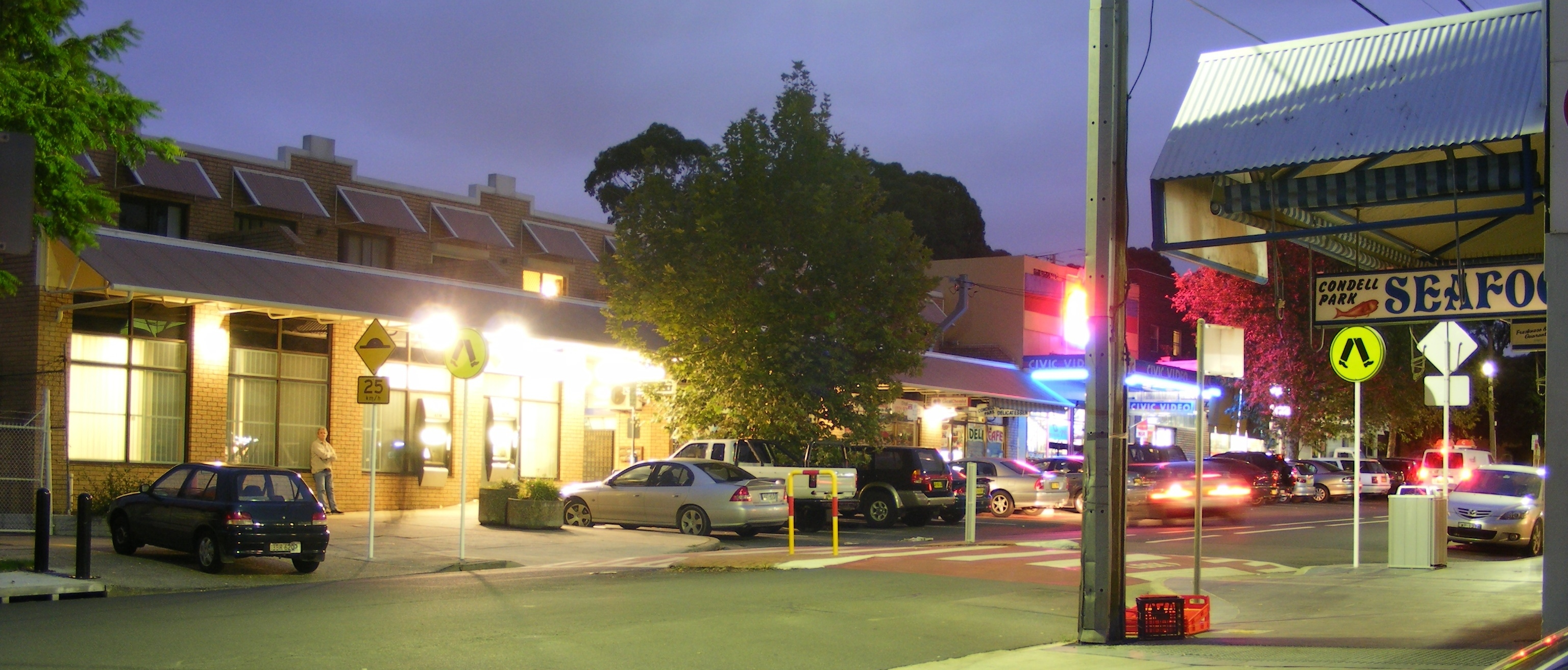
- Evening at Condell Park shopping centre, Simmat Avenue, looking north.

- Interactive map of Condell Park
- Coordinates: 33°55′30″S 151°0′28″E
- Country: Australia
- State: New South Wales
- City: Sydney
- LGA: City of Canterbury-Bankstown
- Location: 21 km (13 mi) south-west of Sydney CBD
- Established: 1830

Government
  - State electorates: East Hills; Bankstown
  - Federal division: Watson
- Elevation: 45 m (148 ft)

Population
  - Total: 13,066 (2021 census)
- Postcode: 2200
Suburbs around Condell Park
Georges Hall	Bass Hill	Yagoona
Bankstown Aerodrome	Condell Park	Bankstown
Milperra	Revesby	Padstow

Condell Park is a suburb in Western Sydney in the state of New South Wales, Australia. The suburb is 21 kilometres south-west of the Sydney central business district and is a part of the City of Canterbury Bankstown local government area, and within the Inner South West area categorised by the Australian Bureau of Statistics. The postcode of Condell Park is 2200, which is shared with Bankstown and Bankstown Aerodrome.

== History ==
Condell Park was named after Ousley Condell, an engineer who arrived on 8 May 1829 on the barque Swiftsure with 13 other settlers. He applied for a position in the public service and was granted four 50-acre (200,000 m^{2}) adjoining lots in 1830 that he called Condell Park.

Black Charlie's Hill, located in Simmat Avenue Condell Park, was named after a local identity whose nickname was 'Black Charlie'. His real name is said to have been Charles Luzon or Charlie Lopez, a man of Aboriginal ancestry. He lived near Edgar Street, South Yagoona and like others in the area, during the early 1900s, grew vegetables that he carried off to the market by horse and cart. His home was constructed of corrugated iron. Black Charlie was said to fire a single shot each evening promptly at 9pm but the reason was never disclosed. Some suggested he was hunting rabbits, others to warn of the approach of aircraft.

=== Bankstown Bunker ===
The heritage listed Bankstown Bunker was an exact replica of the underground Ops rooms of wartime England, which directed Britain's air defence fighter plane attacks on the invading German Luftwaffe. It had all the attenuated fixtures necessary to run a top secret operational defence base. The bunker was equipped with its own code room, plotting rooms, two escape tunnels and a radio transmitter room. In the centre of the bunker was a large room of about two stories in height. This was the main Ops room and control centre for all RAAF Missions in the Pacific area. The room also had a large map of the South West Pacific theater of World War II.

=== Recent history ===
In October 2020, Mejid Hamzy, the brother of Brothers for Life gang founder Bassam Hamzy, was shot dead in a driveby shooting at his Condell Park home.

== Demographics ==
In the 2021 census, Condell Park recorded a population of 13,066 people.

The median age of the Condell Park population was 34 years, four years below the national median of 38.

52.7% of people were born in Australia. The next most common countries of birth were Vietnam 10.1%, Lebanon 9.8%, Syria 1.5%, Greece 1.5% and China 1.5%.

28.8% of people spoke only English at home. Other languages spoken at home included Arabic 30.2%, Vietnamese 14.3%, Greek 4.0%, Macedonian 2.2% and Mandarin 1.7%.

The most common responses for religion were Islam 31.4%, Catholic 21.9%, No Religion 10.6% and Eastern Orthodox 9.5%.

== Commercial area ==
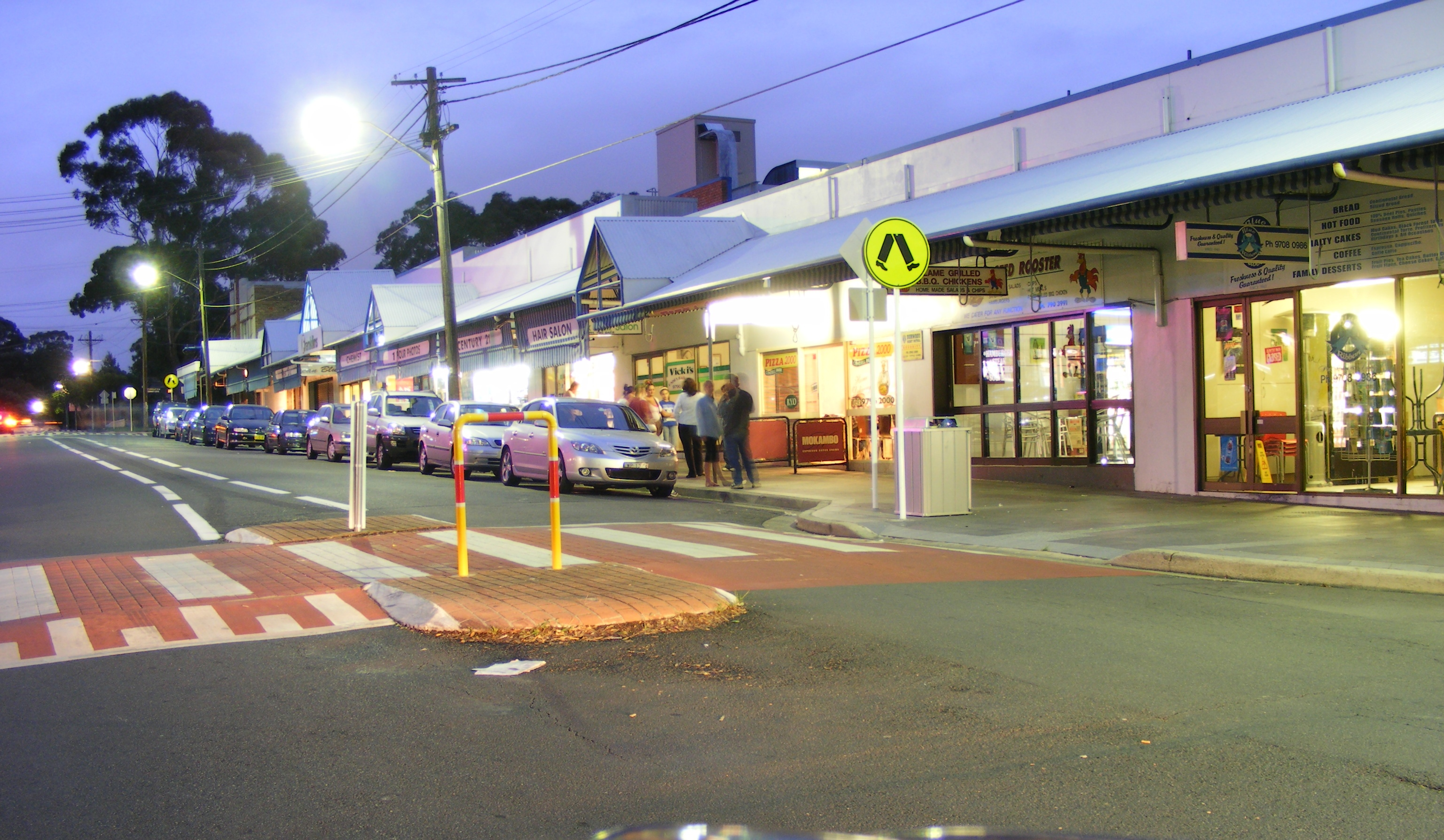
Condell Park Shopping Centre

There are a number of shops in Condell Park, including IGA supermarket, several chemists and numerous other shops and restaurants. Most of the shops are located on a small section of Simmat Avenue, with a few other shops scattered around the suburb.

There is also a commercial area on the corner of Chapel and Canterbury Roads, which is commonly known as Manahan.

== Schools ==
- Condell Park Public School (K-6)
- Condell Park High School (7-12)
- Condell Park Christian School (K-10)

== Churches ==
- Condell Park Anglican Church
- Condell Park Bible Church

== Sport and recreation ==
Condell Park is home to Club Condell Park (formerly Bankstown Trotting Club), next to where Bankstown Markets are held every Sunday. The sporting venue Deverall Park is home to an extensive number of netball courts, 6 tennis courts, and the Bankstown Basketball Stadium which is the largest basketball stadium in Australia. Kinch Reserve, next to the Basketball Stadium, is home to Condell Park Football Club.
