= Padstow, New South Wales =

Suburb of Sydney, Australia

Padstow
- Suburb
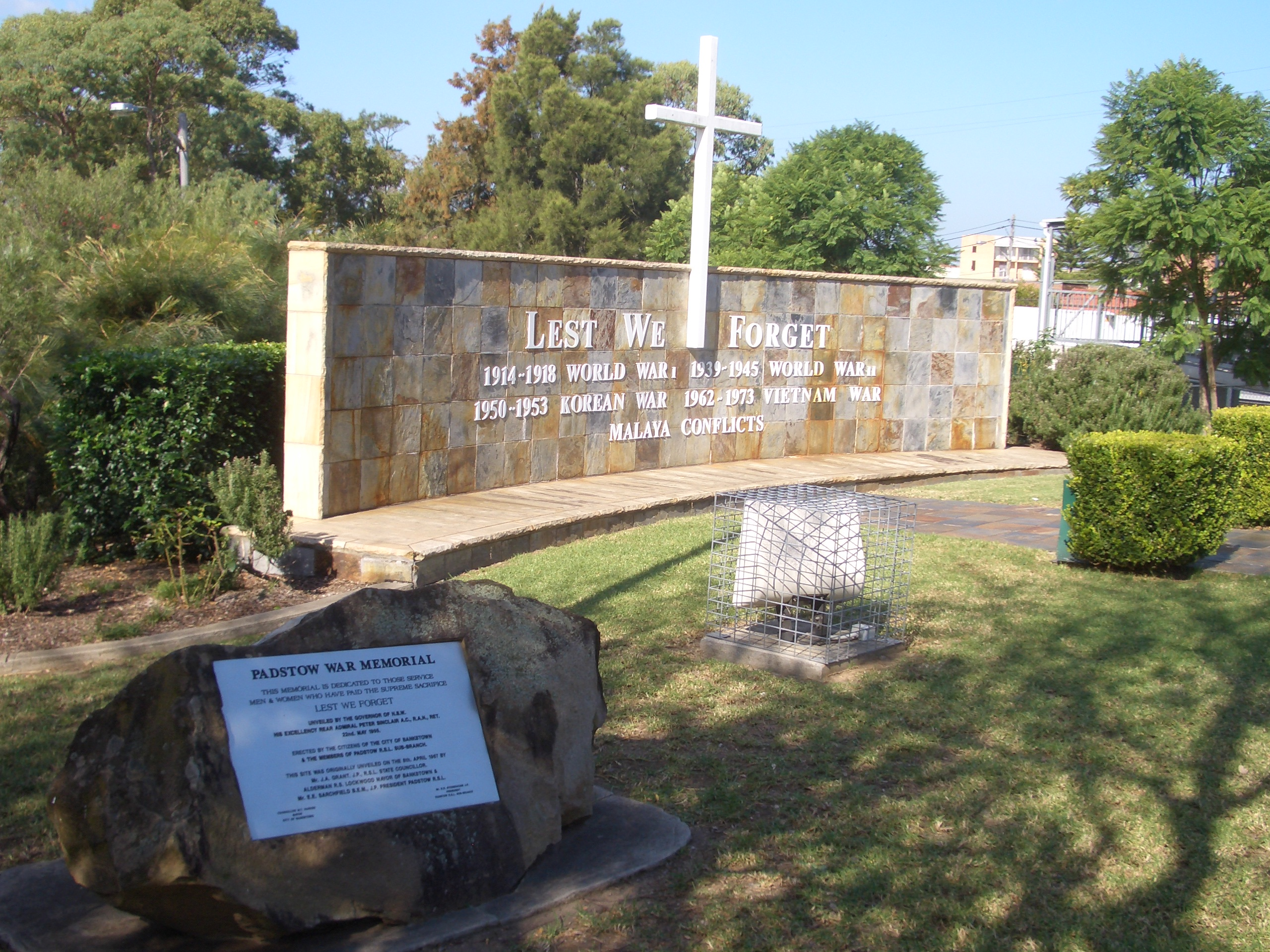
- Padstow War Memorial

- Interactive map of Padstow
- Country: Australia
- State: New South Wales
- LGA: City of Canterbury-Bankstown
- Location: 21 km (13 mi) south-west of Sydney CBD

Government
  - State electorate: East Hills
  - Federal division: Banks
- Elevation: 25 m (82 ft)

Population
  - Total: 14,017 (2021 census)
- Postcode: 2211
Suburbs around Padstow
| Condell Park | Bankstown | Punchbowl |
| Revesby | Padstow | Riverwood |
| Revesby Heights | Padstow Heights | Peakhurst |

Padstow is a suburb in South-western Sydney in the state of New South Wales, Australia. It is in the local government area of City of Canterbury-Bankstown and is located 21 kilometres south-west of the Sydney central business district. Padstow is a mostly residential suburb bounded on the north by Bankstown and on the east by Salt Pan Creek, which is a stream feeding into the Georges River. The M5 South Western Motorway traverses the northern end of the suburb, which is also the location of a number of light industrial facilities.

== History ==
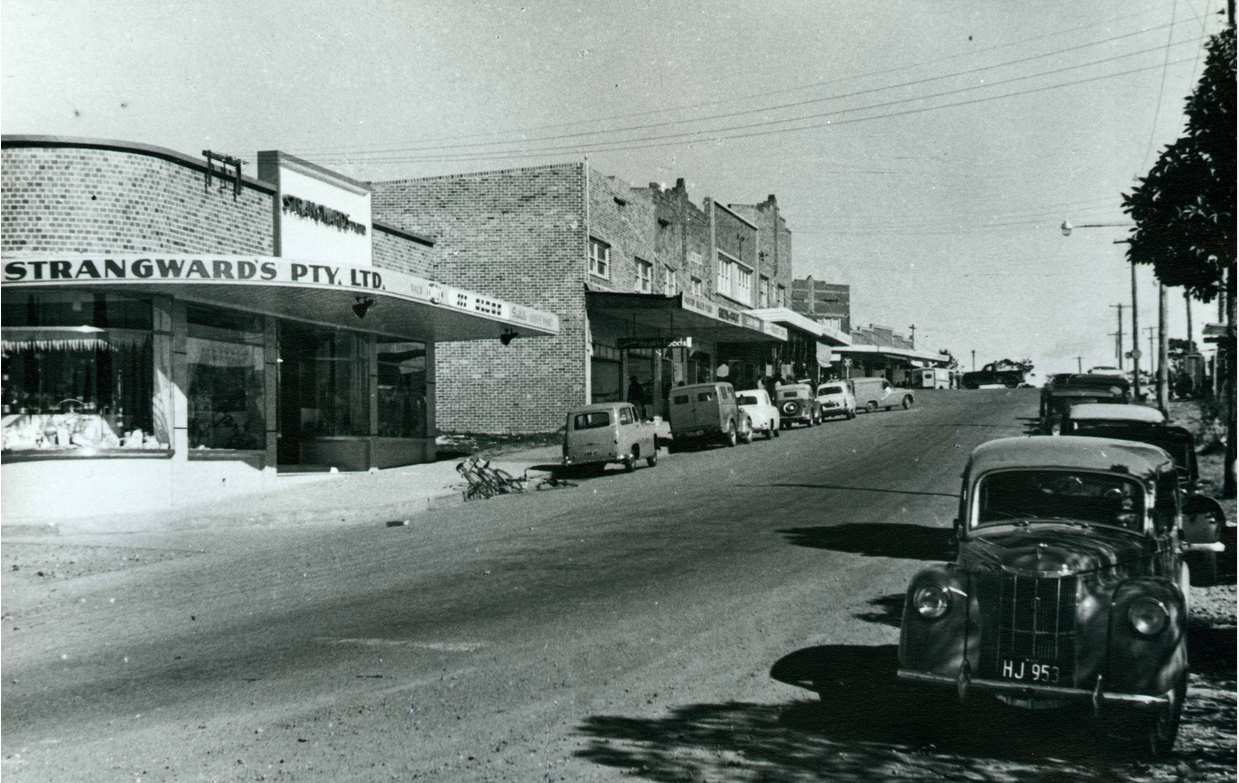
Howard Road in 1955

Padstow was first named Padstow Park Estate after the town of Padstow in Cornwall, England. The Cornish Padstow's name means "the holy place of St Petrock" (not to be confused with St Patrick, as they are spelled and pronounced differently), an important Cornish saint. The estate included the grants of Simon McGuigan (130 acres), Joseph Cunningham 50 acres (20 ha) and Michael Conroy 40 acres (16 ha) . Timber-getting and farming were the main activities here. The Padstow Park post office opened in 1927 and the first school opened in January 1929. The railway station opened on 21 December 1931, which encouraged development in the area, especially after World War II. The suburb's name was changed to Padstow in 1939.

== Commercial area ==
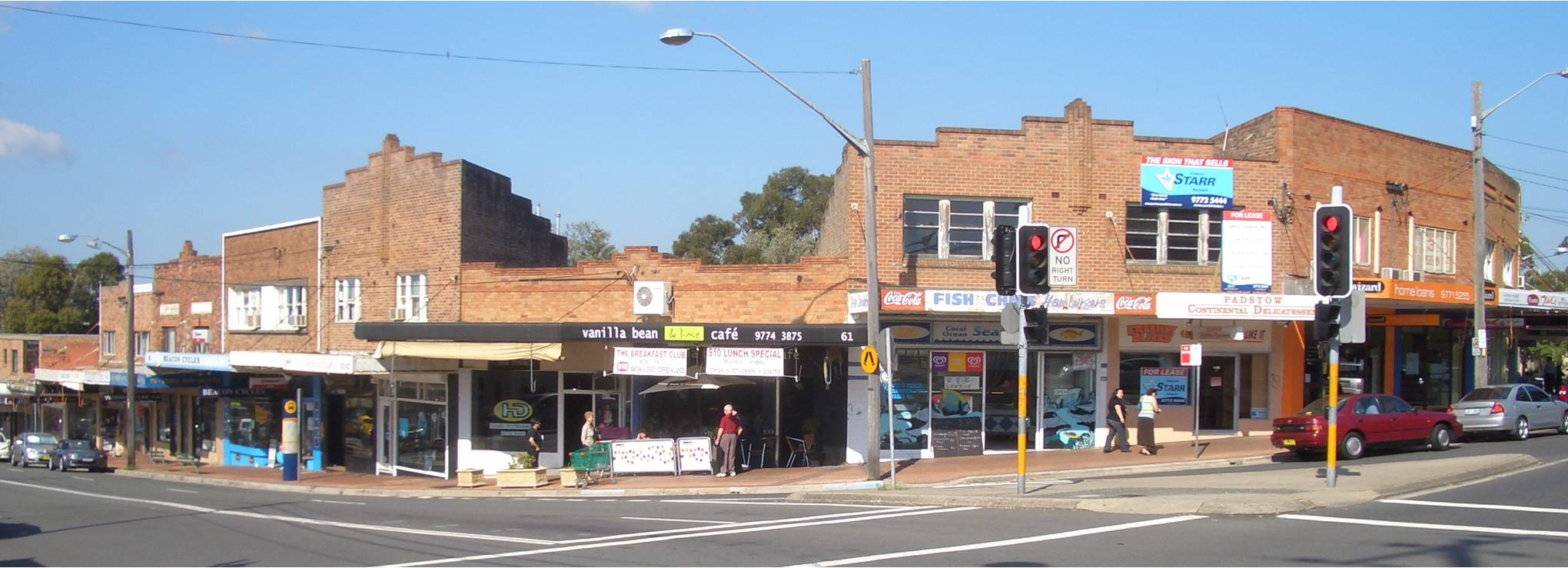
Howard Road and Padstow Parade intersection

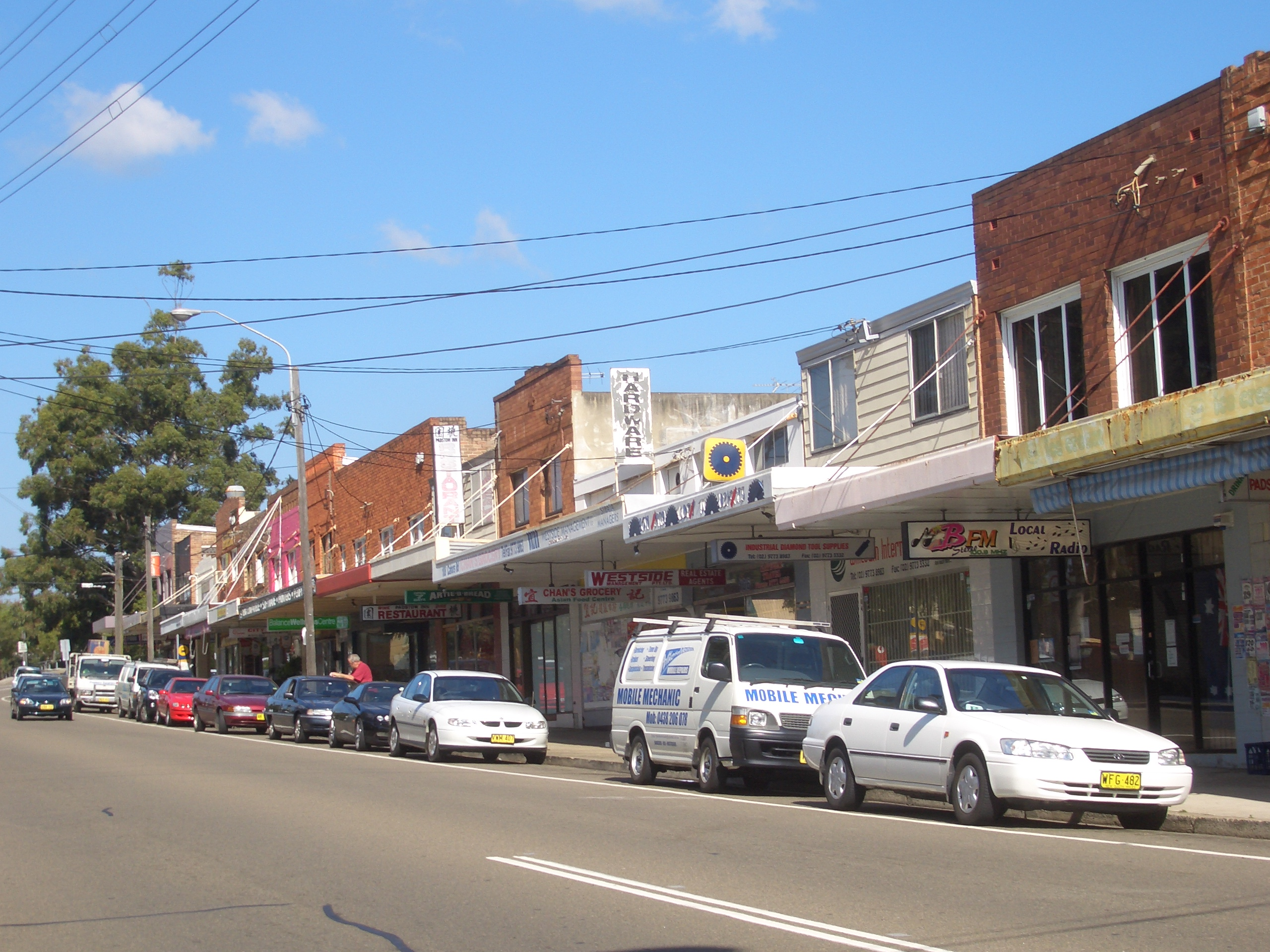
Cahors Road

Padstow shopping centre is located around Padstow railway station. Most of the shops are located on the southern side, around the Howard Road and Padstow Parade intersection, but more shops are located on the northern side past Memorial Drive on Cahors Road.

== Street names ==
A number of the streets in the vicinity of Padstow railway station have Egyptian themes as names, including Arab Road, Cairo Avenue, Pyramid Avenue and Sphinx Avenue. To the west of Padstow, on the border with Revesby there is also a group of streets with outer space related names, such as Uranus Road, Mars Street, Neptune Street, Hydrae Street and Vega Street.

== Transport ==
Padstow railway station is on the Sydney Trains Airport & South Line, west of Riverwood and east of Revesby. There are several bus routes that pass through Padstow, all operated by U-Go Mobility. These services developed from routes established by McVicar's Bus Services, which was dissolved in 1978. The 927 travels from One Tree Point (the easternmost tip of Padstow Heights) to Padstow. The 962 travels from Bankstown to Miranda through Padstow, Illawong, Menai and Sutherland. The S5 travels from Milperra to Padstow. One Metrobus route travels through Padstow: M91 and, formerly, M92. M91 travels from Parramatta to Hurstville, via Granville, Chester Hill, Bankstown, Padstow and Peakhurst. 960, which replaced the M92 service in September 2023, travels from Bankstown to Sutherland via Padstow and Menai.

== Demographics ==
According to the 2021 Australian census, there were 14,017 residents in Padstow. 56.3% of people were born in Australia. The next most common countries of birth were China 7.3%, Vietnam 4.5%, Lebanon 2.4%, India 1.8% and New Zealand 1.7%. 49.2% of residents spoke only English at home. Other languages spoken at home included Arabic 7.8%, Cantonese 7.0%, Mandarin 6.5%, Vietnamese 5.5% and Greek 3.3%. The most common responses for religion in Padstow were No Religion 25.2%, Catholic 23.3%, Islam 8.9%, Anglican 8.0% and Eastern Orthodox 7.3%.

== Churches ==
- South West Christian Church
- St Therese Catholic Church
- Padstow Baptist Community Church
- Trinity Christian Church
- Padstow Chinese Congregational Church
- Lifegate Church, Padstow
- Padstow Anglican Church
- Grace Christian Church (formerly Padstow Uniting Church)

== Schools ==
Padstow has five schools – four public schools and one Catholic school. All are K-6, with students then moving to high schools in the nearby suburbs of Revesby, Picnic Point, East Hills or Milperra. Primary schools include Padstow North Public and School Padstow Park Public School. Padstow Park Public School gains its title from the original name of the suburb. It is the oldest school in the suburb.

St Therese Primary School is a single-stream primary school which was opened in 1962.

Caroline Chisholm is a school for students that have "moderate to severe support needs".

== Sport ==
The suburb is home to two junior football (soccer) clubs: Padstow United, whose home ground is Playford Park at the intersection of Gibson, Cahors, Watson and Sphinx Roads, and the Padstow Hornets, who play at Stuart Street Reserve on Stuart Street. In the 1960s, the suburb also supported additional football clubs including the now defunct clubs of Padstow Pirates Soccer Club (later renamed South Bankstown Soccer Club), the Padstow Hotspurs Soccer Club and the Padstow RSL Junior Soccer Football Club. The Padstow Pirates and South Bankstown Soccer clubs used Playford Park as their home ground. Padstow Park, which is on the corner of Davies Road and Banks Road, is the home ground of the Padstow Panthers Junior Rugby League Club. It was also the home ground of the now defunct St Lukes Junior Rugby League Club and the Padstow RSL Junior Soccer Football Club. Padstow is also home to Doug Frost Swim School, where Ian Thorpe first began swimming. Padstow Bowling & Recreation Club situated in Iberia Street has two first class synthetic greens and keen supporter of Zone 12 NSW Bowling Association.

== Politics ==
For federal elections, Padstow is located in both the marginal Liberal federal electoral division of Banks which seat is currently held by Zhi Soon, of the Australian Labor Party, since the 2025 Australian federal election and the safe Liberal seat of Division of Hughes, previously held by Craig Kelly, who lost the seat after defecting to the United Australia Party.

For NSW state elections, Padstow is located in the state electoral district of East Hills. As of 2023, this seat is held by Kylie Wilkinson.
