= Revesby Heights =

- Suburb
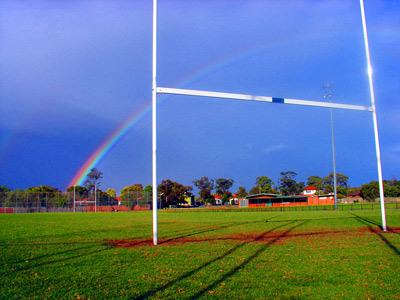
- Rainbow in Neptune Park

- Interactive map of Revesby Heights
- Country: Australia
- State: New South Wales
- City: Sydney
- LGA: City of Canterbury-Bankstown
- Location: 24 km (15 mi) south-west of Sydney CBD

Government
  - State electorate: East Hills
  - Federal division: Banks
- Elevation: 28 m (92 ft)

Population
  - Total: 1,916 (2021 census)
- Postcode: 2212
Suburbs around Revesby Heights
Revesby	Revesby	Padstow
Picnic Point	Revesby Heights	Padstow Heights
Picnic Point	Alfords Point	Padstow Heights

Revesby Heights is a suburb in South-western Sydney in the state of New South Wales, Australia. It is part of the local government area of City of Canterbury-Bankstown, and is located 24 kilometres south-west of the Sydney central business district.

Revesby Heights is located on the northern bank of the Georges River and west of Little Salt Pan Creek.

== History ==
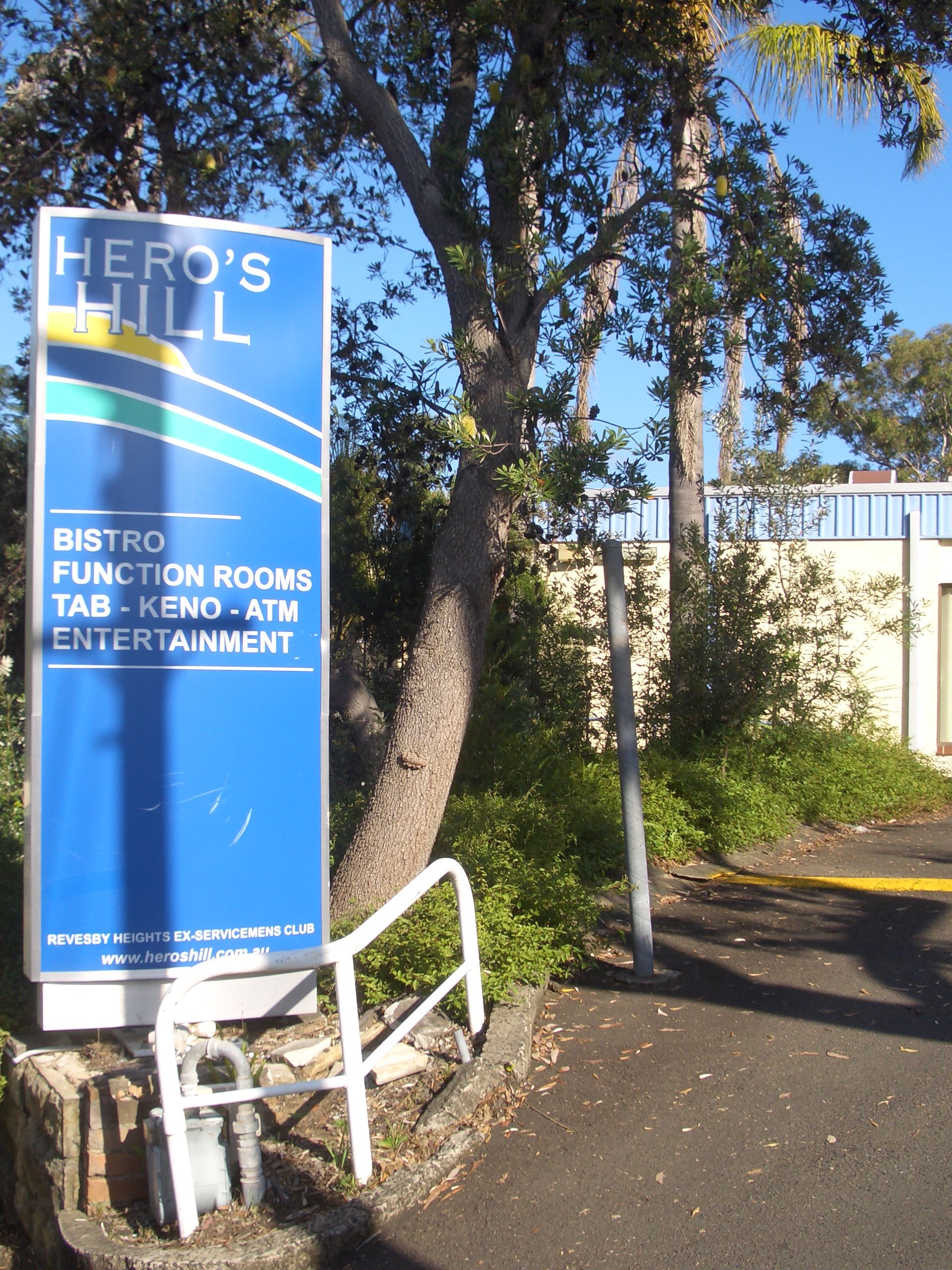
Hero's Hill

Revesby was named in 1913 in honour of Sir Joseph Banks (1743–1820), the famous botanist who sailed with Captain James Cook on the Endeavour, when he discovered the east coast of Australia in 1770. Banks had inherited his father's estate of Revesby Abbey, in Lincolnshire, England, so he was known as the Squire of Revesby. He is also commemorated in the Sir Joseph Banks High School in Turvey Street.

Revesby Heights was known as Hero's Hill in recognition of returned service men who obtained affordable government housing in the area. The Hero's Hill servicemen's club was founded soon after these returned service men settled in the area after World War II. This club later became known as Revesby Heights Ex-Servicemen's Club. This club ceased trading in June 2013.

== Schools ==
De La Salle College provides education for boys in years 7–12.

== Sport and recreation ==
Revesby Heights Junior Rugby League Football Club, part of the Canterbury Bankstown District Junior Rugby League, is a rugby league club that operates from Neptune Park. Known locally as "Heighties", the club has supplied many first grade and representative players to the National Rugby League over its 40-year history. For the 2007 season the club has fielded 12 Junior and one Senior U/15s team. The club is the only one in the district to have its own organised cheerleading squad made up of young girls and boys from the area.
