= Joe Kelly (New South Wales politician) =

Australian politician

Robert Joseph Kelly (16 April 1905 – 7 December 1995) was an Australian politician. He was a Labor Party member of the New South Wales Legislative Assembly from 1956 to 1973, representing the electorate of East Hills.

Kelly was born at Rix Creek, near Singleton. His miner father was seriously injured in an industrial accident when he was five, leading Kelly and his sister to live with their grandmother; he returned to live with his father when he was fifteen. He attended Chatswood Intermediate High School, but went to Queensland at the age of 17 to cut cane. He returned to Lithgow at the age of 20; over the next thirty years he worked alternately as a steelworker, metallurgist, and brickworks engine-driver. He was actively involved in the local Labor Party, serving as the president and secretary of the local branch, and was elected an alderman of the City of Bankstown from 1953 to 1954.

Kelly was elected to the safe Labor seat of East Hills at the 1956 state election upon the retirement of Arthur Williams. He was re-elected without difficulty at five state elections, before retiring in 1973. He was credited upon his death with having played a crucial role in the creation of the Georges River National Park, thus saving the area from development. Kelly was succeeded in the seat by Pat Rogan.

Kelly moved out of the East Hills seat after his retirement, living in the Ingleburn area. He died in 1995 at Macquarie Fields.

New South Wales Legislative Assembly
Preceded by Arthur Williams	Member for East Hills; 1956 – 1973	Succeeded by Pat Rogan
