= Glenn Brookes =

Australian politician

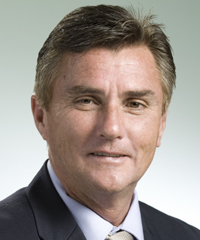

Member of the New South Wales Parliament for East Hills
- In office 26 March 2011 – 23 March 2019
- Preceded by: Alan Ashton
- Succeeded by: Wendy Lindsay
- Majority: 0.6 points

Personal details
- Born: 13 August 1959 (age 66) Bankstown, New South Wales
- Party: Liberal Party (2011–16, 2017–present); Independent (2016–17)
- Occupation: Politician

Glenn Edward Brookes (born 13 August 1959) is an Australian politician who was a member of the New South Wales Legislative Assembly representing East Hills from 2011 to 2019. A member of the Liberal Party, he resigned to become an independent in 2016 after questions were raised about his 2015 campaign, but rejoined the party in 2017.

== Early years and background ==
Brookes was born at Bankstown Hospital and attended East Hills Primary and High Schools. Leaving school at a young age, he built a successful large business, Sydney Signs, in a monopoly market. He now manages several companies.

== Political career ==
In 2004, Brookes was elected to serve as a councillor on Bankstown City Council and continues to hold this position. He first ran for East Hills in the 2003 NSW election, losing to incumbent Labor member Alan Ashton who achieved 68.5 per cent of the two-party preferred vote. He ran again for East Hills at the 2007 NSW election, losing again to Ashton, on a two-party preferred margin of 64.1 per cent for Labor. Brookes was the recipient of a 3.8-point increase in support from the 2003 election.

In 2011, Brookes again contested East Hills; Ashton was again his main competitor. With the election strategies implemented by his Campaign Manager, Geoffrey Grasso, Brookes defeated Ashton, with a swing of 14.3 per cent, winning the seat from Labor for the first time in history, and holding the seat with 50.6 per cent of the two-party vote. Since the seat of East Hills was created in 1953, up until the 2011 NSW election, it had been held continuously by Labor, represented by only three members of parliament. On 21 March 2016, Brookes resigned from the Liberal Party to sit as an independent after his election campaign manager, Jim Daniels, was charged with electoral offences. He later rejoined the party.

New South Wales Legislative Assembly
Preceded by Alan Ashton	Member for East Hills; 2011–2019	Succeeded by Wendy Lindsay
