= Cameron Murphy =

Australian politician

The Honourable Cameron Murphy AM MLC
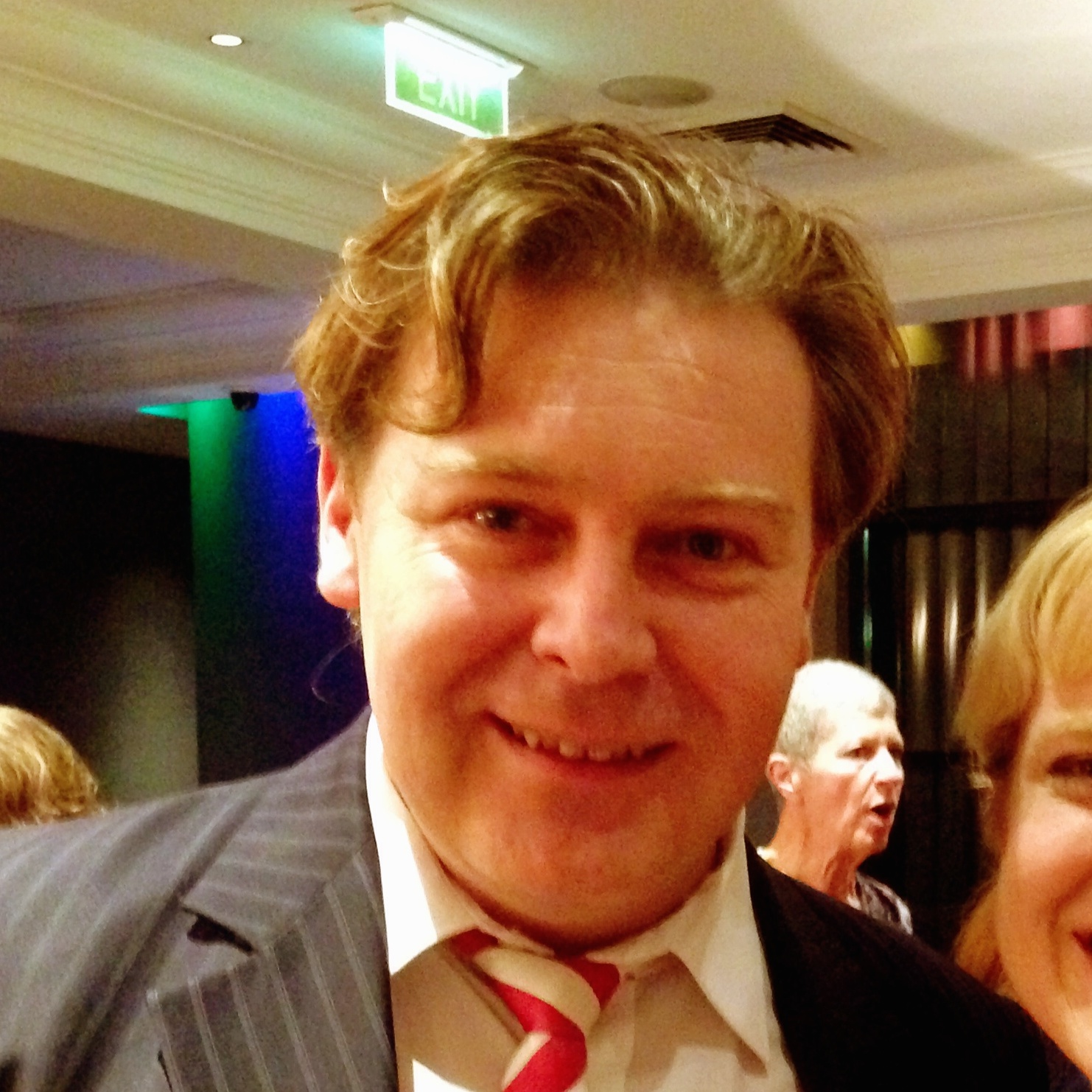

Member of the New South Wales Legislative Council
- Incumbent
- Assumed office 25 March 2023

Personal details
- Born: 30 March 1973 (age 53) Camperdown, New South Wales, Australia
- Party: Labor Party
- Spouse: Agatha
- Education: Macquarie University
- Website: Personal Website

The Hon. Cameron Lionel Murphy AM MLC (born 30 March 1973) is an Australian barrister, civil libertarian and Labor Party member of the NSW Legislative Council.

Murphy is a member of the New South Wales Bar Association and is admitted as a lawyer in NSW. He specialises in Industrial Law, Workplace Health & Safety, Administrative Law and Intellectual Property Law. He is best known for his role as the President of the NSW Council for Civil Liberties from 1999 to 2013 and was endorsed as the ALP candidate in the seat of East Hills for the March 2015 and March 2019 NSW state elections, which he narrowly lost. He was the seventh person elected to the NSW Legislative Council at the 2023 NSW state election.

== Personal and early life ==
Murphy is the son of former Attorney-General and High Court Justice, Lionel Murphy and Ingrid Gee (née Grzonkowski). Murphy has two siblings, a half sister Lorel and a brother Blake. Murphy was educated at Macquarie University where he graduated with a Bachelor of Arts and a Bachelor of Laws. He is married to Agatha and has two children, a son and a daughter.

== Career ==
Murphy was an intern under the Australian Council of Trade Unions 'Organising Works' program in its inaugural year, 1994, where he trained in recruitment and organising of workers. He was placed as an Organiser with the Forestry Division of the Construction, Forestry, Mining and Energy Union and upon graduation he continued to work there from 1994 to 1997 becoming an Industrial Officer in 1996–1997.

During his career in civil liberties and administrative justice, Murphy served as President of the NSW Council for Civil Liberties from 1999 to 2013, a period in which he was publicly active on human rights issues. In that capacity he regularly engaged with policymakers, media and community organisations to articulate civil liberties concerns and to respond to legislative proposals. He was also appointed as a Statutory Board Member of the Anti-Discrimination Board of NSW, serving from 2003 to 2009, and was a member of the Consumer, Trader and Tenancy Tribunal of New South Wales between 2003 and 2008.

Alongside these public roles, he has been a Trustee of the Lionel Murphy Foundation since 2004, and worked in the private sector as Operations Manager at International Underwriting Services Pty Ltd from 2008 to 2011 before becoming Director of Employee Benefits at Coverforce Pty Ltd from 2011 to 2014. Within the party organisation, he has been a member of the Australian Labor Party National Policy Forum since 2012, and has served as a Board Member of the Light on the Hill Society since 2015.

Since 2016, Murphy has practised as a barrister at Denman Chambers, focusing on Employment/Industrial, Administrative and Human Rights Law. His practice areas align with his earlier work in industrial relations and civil liberties, providing continuity between his professional roles and public advocacy.

== Political career ==
In 2012, Murphy stood as a candidate in the NSW Labor Party's trial community preselection for the Lord Mayor of the City of Sydney. He was unsuccessful, with Linda Scott winning the community preselection.

In 2012, he stood as a candidate in the rank and file ballot for the ALP National Policy Forum on a human rights platform and he was elected as one of only six rank and file representatives from NSW. In 2016, he was re-elected for a second three-year term with the second-highest vote tally of the five NSW candidates elected.

In 2014, Murphy was preselected as the Labor candidate for the state electorate of East Hills, defeating Nicole Campbell in a rank and file preselection by 103 votes to 61 (weighted up to 73.2 under the ALP rules affirmative action weighting for female candidates). He was narrowly defeated by the sitting Liberal Party member at the 2015 New South Wales state election

In February 2017, he was preselected once again, unopposed, as the Labor candidate for East Hills at the 2019 New South Wales state election. Murphy again was narrowly defeated in the 2019 state election for Electoral district of East Hills losing by just 429 votes.

In 2022, Murphy ran for preselection for the NSW Legislative Council within the Socialist Left Faction of the Labor Party. He came fourth behind Rose Jackson, John Graham and Mich Veitch after a number of his voters were excluded from participating in the ballot. He then nominated at the NSW State Labor Conference for a position on the NSW Legislative Council ticket, running against the factional tickets. The previously excluded voters in the Left factional ballot were able to participate at the ALP State Conference. He was successful and was preselected at the number 3 position on the Labor ticket for the NSW Legislative Council at the 2023 NSW State Election. Murphy was declared elected in 7th position for the NSW Legislative Council at the 2023 NSW Election.

In October 2023, Murphy signed an open letter which condemned attacks against Israeli and Palestinian civilians during the Gaza war. In August 2025, Murphy attended the March for Humanity in Sydney, a large protest highlighting the plight of Palestinians in the Gaza conflict.

== Awards ==
In 2013, Murphy was a finalist for the Australian Human Rights Commission Human Rights Awards 2013 in the "Community (Individual) Award - Tony Fitzgerald Memorial Award" category.

In 2013, Murphy was made an Honorary Life Member of the NSW Council for Civil Liberties.

In 2014, he was made a Member of the Order of Australia (AM) for his significant service to the community through a range of human rights and civil liberty organisations.
