= Alan Ashton (politician) =

Australian politician

Alan John Ashton OAM (born 3 June 1952) is an Australian former politician, previously a member of the New South Wales Legislative Assembly.

Ashton received a Master of Arts and Diploma of Education from the University of Sydney and taught at schools in southwestern Sydney. He was a councillor on the City of Bankstown from 1977 to 1987 and 1987 to 1995. Ashton represented East Hills from 1999, for the Labor Party, and was Deputy Government Whip from 2003.

Ashton emerged as a prominent opponent of the former Iemma Government's plans to privatise the NSW electricity industry. He stated that privatisation would be "the Iemma Government's WorkChoices". He also warned of resulting swings to the Greens in inner-city seats. Ashton is a long-time resident of the East Hills electorate. He is married with two children. His interests include politics, sport, history, education and the Health system. He is a member of the History Teachers Association and the NSW Teachers Federation.

Ashton was defeated by Liberal candidate Glenn Brookes by a mere 494 votes at the 2011 state election. This was the first time Labor had lost the seat since its creation in 1953.

== Notes ==
New South Wales Legislative Assembly
Preceded by Pat Rogan	Member for East Hills; 1999–2011	Succeeded by Glenn Brookes
