= De La Salle College, Revesby Heights =

De La Salle College

Location
- Revesby Heights, Sydney, New South Wales; Bankstown; Sydney, New South Wales; Australia; 33°57′47″S 151°00′53″E

Information
- Other names: De La Salle Revesby
- School type: Independent comprehensive single-sex secondary day school Systemic Catholic High School
- Motto: Christo Regente (Christ Reigns)
- Religious affiliation: De La Salle Brothers
- Denomination: Roman Catholic
- Established: 1960; 66 years ago
- Founder: Fr. Carr
- Status: Open
- Educational authority: Sydney Catholic Schools
- Principal: Michael Hollis
- Staff: ≈60
- Male: Boys
- Enrolment: c. 630
- Colours: Red and black
- Feeder schools: St Christophers Panania Catholic Primary School, St Luke's Catholic Primary School
- Website: www.dlsrevesby.catholic.edu.au

De La Salle Catholic College Revesby Heights, also referred to as De La Salle College Revesby, is an independent Roman Catholic comprehensive single-sex secondary day school for boys, located in Revesby Heights, A suburb of Sydney, New South Wales, Australia. De La Salle caters for approximately 620 students from Year 7 to Year 12.

== History ==
The school was founded in 1960 by the De La Salle brothers. The senior secondary school for students in Year 11 and Year 12 began in 2006, with their first HSC class in 2007.

HSC results are gradually improving, with numerous students being listed on various merit listings. In 2017, DLS Revesby was ranked 115th. De La Salle is also well known for the sporting accomplishments. They win a fair proportion of events in the Christian Brothers Sporting Association (CBSA) competitions. Revesby's Year 9 and 10 Netball was announced in 2018, for the second year in a row, as the best boys team for their age group in NSW. Additionally, their CBSA futsal team were crowned champions in 2018. Achievements also include wins in the statewide 2011 Berg Shield for cricket and the 2011 NSW Teams Championships for Schools for golf.

== Notable alumni ==
- Jacob Host, rugby league football player for St. George Illawarra Dragons
- Ryan Gray, rugby league football player for South Sydney Rabbitohs
- Max Esposito, modern pentathlete, Olympian
- Daryl Melham MP, Federal Member for Banks (1990–2013)
- Glen Hughes, rugby league football player for Canterbury-Bankstown
- Dr Brian Owler, President of the Australian Medical Association (2014–2016)

== Notable faculty ==
- Grayson Waller, professional wrestler

== See also ==
- List of Catholic schools in New South Wales
- Catholic education in Australia
- Lasallian educational institutions
