= Pat Rogan =

Australian politician

Patrick Allan Rogan (22 September 1936 – 10 February 2015) was an Australian politician. He was the Labor Party member of the New South Wales Legislative Assembly for East Hills from 1973 to 1999.

Rogan was apprenticed in electrical trades and received higher education from Granville Technical College and Ultimo Technical College. He was a senior automation sales engineer, and also served in the Royal Australian Air Force for his National Service. He was also active in the Australian Labor Party, and was president of the electoral councils for both his federal seat of Banks and the state seat of East Hills.

In 1973, the sitting member for East Hills, Joe Kelly, retired and Rogan was preselected as his replacement. He won the seat easily, and was never seriously challenged in subsequent elections. He never rose from the back bench and retired in 1999.

He died 10 February 2015 after suffering from mesothelioma for several years.

New South Wales Legislative Assembly
Preceded by Joe Kelly	Member for East Hills; 1973–1999	Succeeded by Alan Ashton
