= Padstow railway station, Sydney =

Railway station in New South Wales, Australia

Padstow
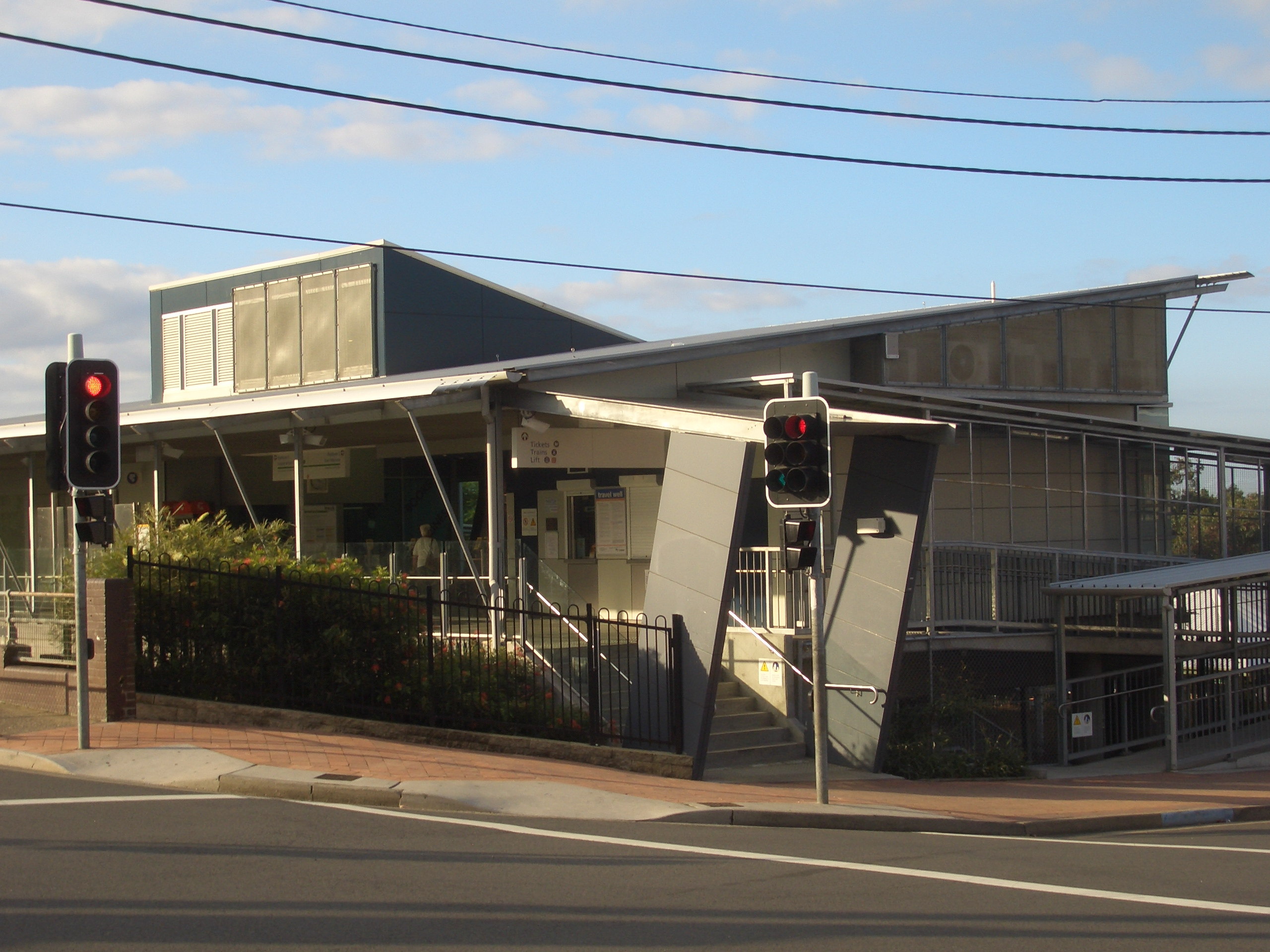
- Station building and entrance, May 2007

General information
- Location: Howard Road, Padstow
- Coordinates: 33°57′07″S 151°01′56″E
- Owner: Transport Asset Manager of New South Wales
- Operator: Sydney Trains
- Line: East Hills
- Distance: 19.34 kilometres (12.02 mi) from Central
- Platforms: 2 (1 island)
- Tracks: 4
- Connections: Bus

Construction
- Structure type: Ground
- Accessible: Yes

Other information
- Status: Weekdays: Staffed: 6am to 7pm: Weekends and public holidays: Staffed: 8am to 4pm
- Station code: PDW
- Website: Transport for NSW

History
- Opened: 21 December 1931

Passengers
- 2025: 1,290,362 (year); 3,535 (daily) (Sydney Trains)
- Rank: 109

Services
Preceding station	Sydney Trains	Following station
Revesby towards Revesby or Macarthur	Airport & South Line	Riverwood towards City Circle
Location

Padstow railway station is a heritage-listed railway station located on the East Hills line, serving the Sydney suburb of Padstow. It is served by Sydney Trains' T8 Airport & South Line services.

== History ==
Padstow station opened on 21 December 1931 when the line was extended from Kingsgrove to East Hills.

On 5 May 1986, the line was duplicated from Riverwood with a new track laid to the north of the existing one. The line from Padstow to Revesby was duplicated around the same time.

In 2002, the station was upgraded and given a new concourse and lift.

In 2013, as part of the quadruplication of the line from Kingsgrove to Revesby, through lines were added on either side of the existing pair.

== Platforms and services ==
Platform	Line	Stopping pattern	Notes
1	Airport & South Line	services to Central & the City Circle via the Airport	
2	Airport & South Line	services to Revesby early morning & late night services to Macarthur; 2 weekday evening peak services to Campbelltown	

== Transport Links ==
U-Go Mobility operates five bus routes via Padstow station, under contract to Transport for NSW:

- 927: to One Tree Point
- 950: Hurstville Station to Bankstown Station
- 960: Sutherland Station to Bankstown Station
- 962: Sutherland station to East Hills station
- 963: to Menai, Alfords Point, Illawong and Sutherland Station

== Gallery ==
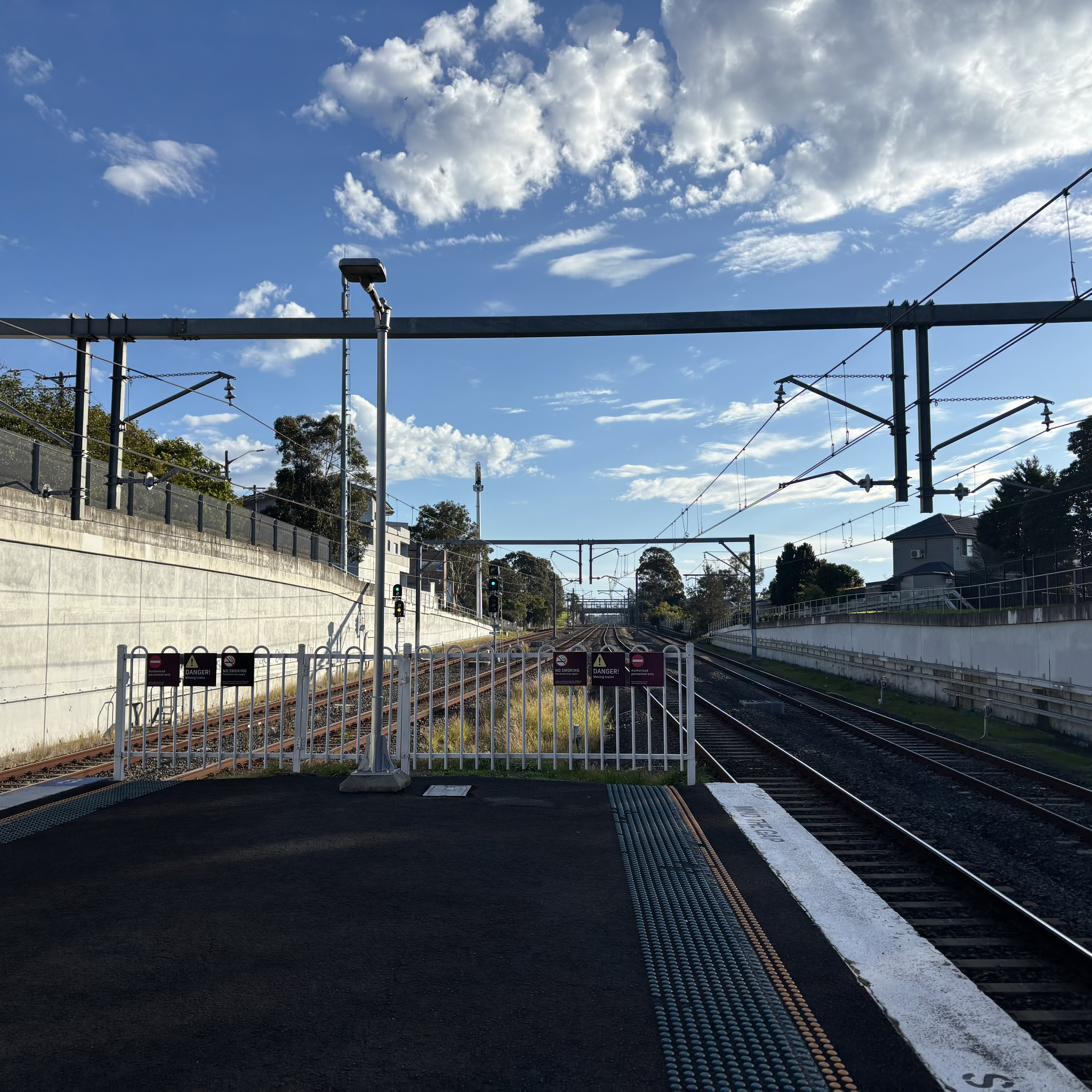
Padstow station facing west in July 2025

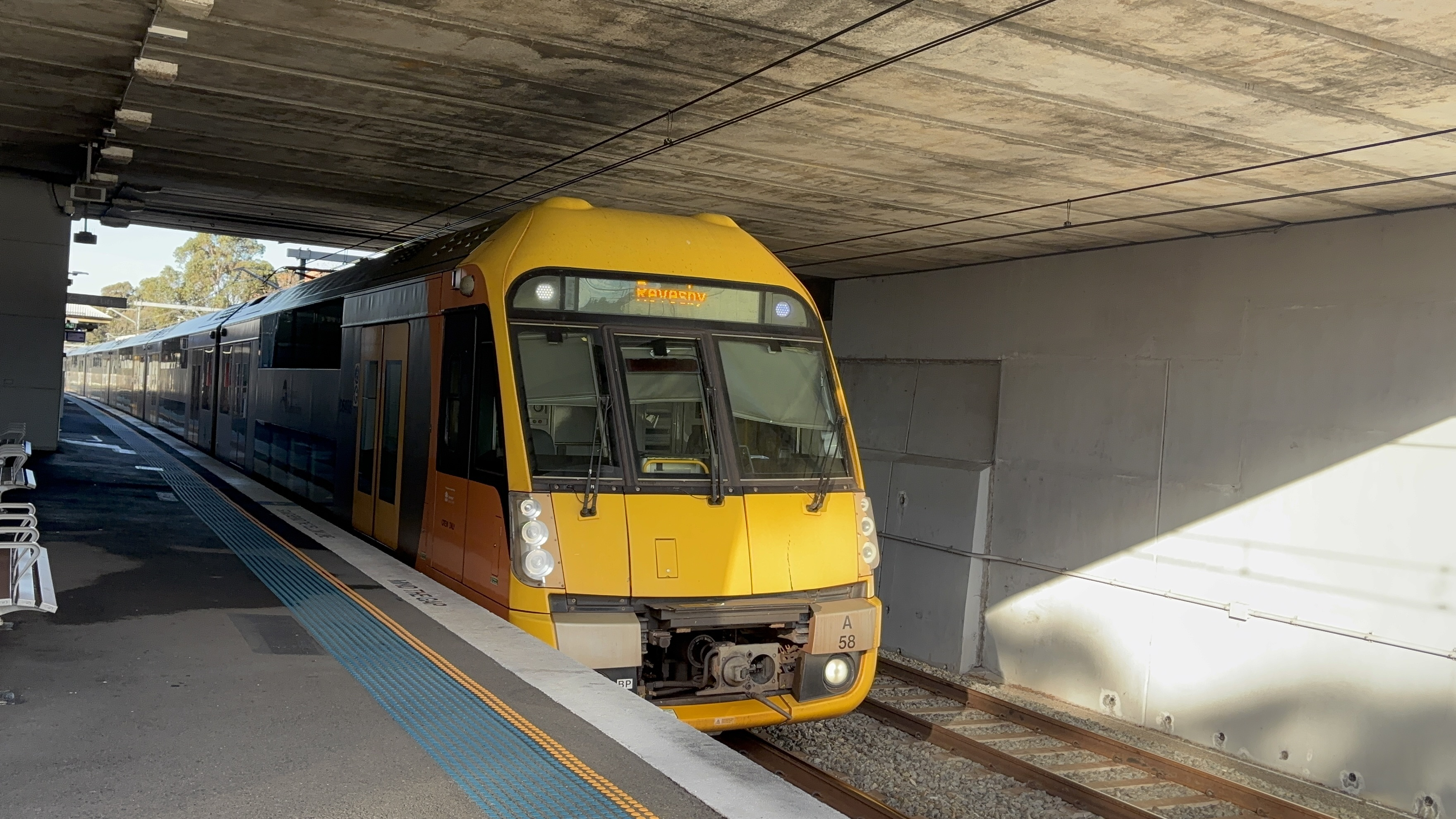
A58 arriving at Padstow for Revesby in July 2025
