= Salt Pan Creek =

Coordinates: 33°57′S 151°03′E

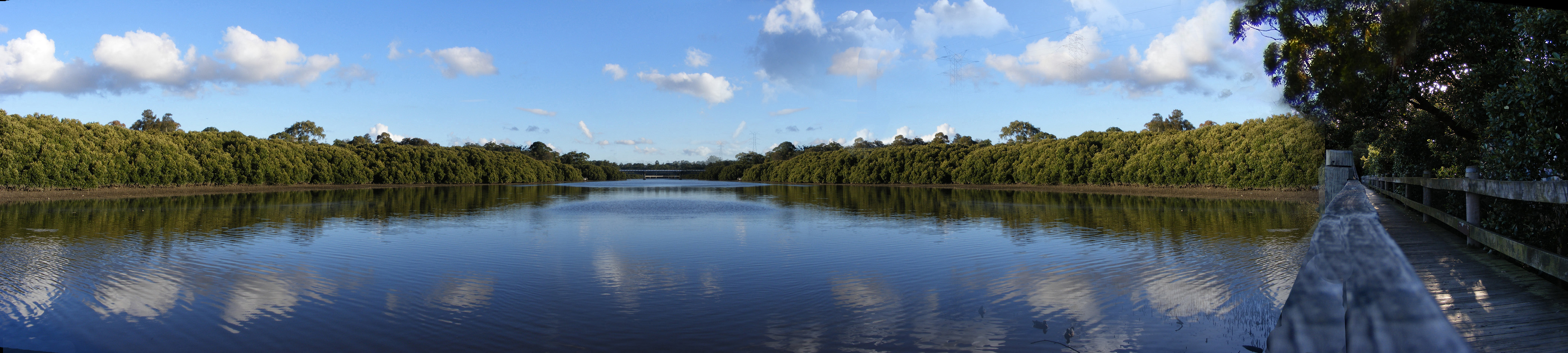
- Etymology: Early settlers took salt from the swampland by evaporating the salt water.

Location
- Country: Australia
- State: New South Wales
- Region: Sydney Basin (IBRA), Canterbury-Bankstown, Southern Sydney
- Local government areas: City of Canterbury-Bankstown, Georges River

Physical characteristics
- Source
  - location: west of Mount Lewis
- Mouth: confluence with the Georges River
  - location: Lugarno
- Length: 7 km (4.3 mi)
- Basin size: 26 km^{2} (10 sq mi)

Basin features
- River system: Georges River

Salt Pan Creek is an urban watercourse of the Georges River catchment, located in the Canterbury-Bankstown region of Sydney, in New South Wales, Australia. The banks of the creek are of historical importance to Aboriginal Australians, being one of the few places where some Aboriginal families owned land, the site also becoming a focal point for Indigenous rights in the early 20th century.

== History ==
Aboriginal Australians lived on both sides of the Georges Creek for many years before the colonisation of Australia. The Salt Pan Creek area, on the northern shore of the Georges River between present-day Padstow and Riverwood is the traditional country of the Bidjigal clan of the Dharug people.

Salt Pan Creek was named by early colonial settlers, who took salt from the swampland by evaporating the salt water.

From as early as 1809, the land surrounding Salt Pan Creek was the site of uprising by Indigenous Australians against colonial settlement. Tedbury, the son of Pemulwuy, an Aboriginal elder, was involved in a skirmish that saw Frederick Meredith, a European settler, injured with a spear and forced to abandon his farm. Meredith and another settler were seeking to clear and cultivate land surrounding the creek that may have been an important food source for Aboriginal people.

In the early 1900s, some Aboriginal families bought land along the creek, including Dharawal woman Ellen Anderson, at time when it was very rare for Aboriginal people to hold freehold land. The Rowley family also bought land along the creek, which was not farmed as it was low-lying, and had large amounts of sandstone and forest. The surrounding land was similar to these two blocks, and became camps for Aboriginal people not wanting to live on Aboriginal reserves, which were controlled by the Aborigines Welfare Board under the Aborigines Protection Act 1909. Teenage girls were sent to serve as domestic servants, often becoming pregnant in white homes, while young men were sent to work on sheep or cattle stations for no payment. They lived by working for a variety of jobs for cash, and by using their knowledge of the flora and fauna of the area. Some sold wildflowers door-to-door; others collected the bright red gum tips and Christmas bush and sold them at the Friday night markets. They were all able to gather oysters, prawns and river fish, and there were swamp wallabies and other game which could be hunted for food. The land remained as open camping grounds for Aboriginal people until the 1930s.

Ellen and Hugh Anderson maintained contact with the Aborigines Inland Mission, and met the founders of the Australian Aboriginal Progressive Association (AAPA) in the 1920s, Aboriginal rights activist Fred Maynard and missionary Elizabeth McKenzie Hatton. In 1924, AAPA set up a safe house in Homebush, not far away, for Aboriginal girls who had left their apprenticeships.

Between 1926 and 1935, lands surrounding the creek became a focal point for Indigenous rights, as they set up squatter camps that consisted of refugee families whose traditional lands had been taken by settlers, and also those seeking to escape the Aboriginal Protection Board. The land was important because it was freehold, and therefore not under any government or missionary control, and politics was a major source of conversation at the camp.

The refugees included Bill Onus, Jack Patten, Jack(o) Campbell (from Kempsey), Pearl Gibbs, Ted Thomas from Wallaga Lake Aboriginal Station, Bert Groves, and siblings Tom Williams Jnr and Ellen James, grandchildren of Ellen Anderson. In 1933, Joe Anderson (aka "King Burraga") son of Ellen and Hugh Anderson, was filmed at Salt Pan Creek by Cinesound news urging his people to petition King George V for better conditions, and rights and recognition for Indigenous Australians.

In May 2025, to launch the nationwide truth-telling project run by Uluru Dialogue, one of the groups that signed the 2017 Uluru Statement from the Heart in 2017, called "Towards Truth", Hurstville Library mounted an exhibition of the same name. The project aims to map all of the laws and policies affecting Indigenous Australians since colonisation in 1788, starting with New South Wales.

== Course and features ==
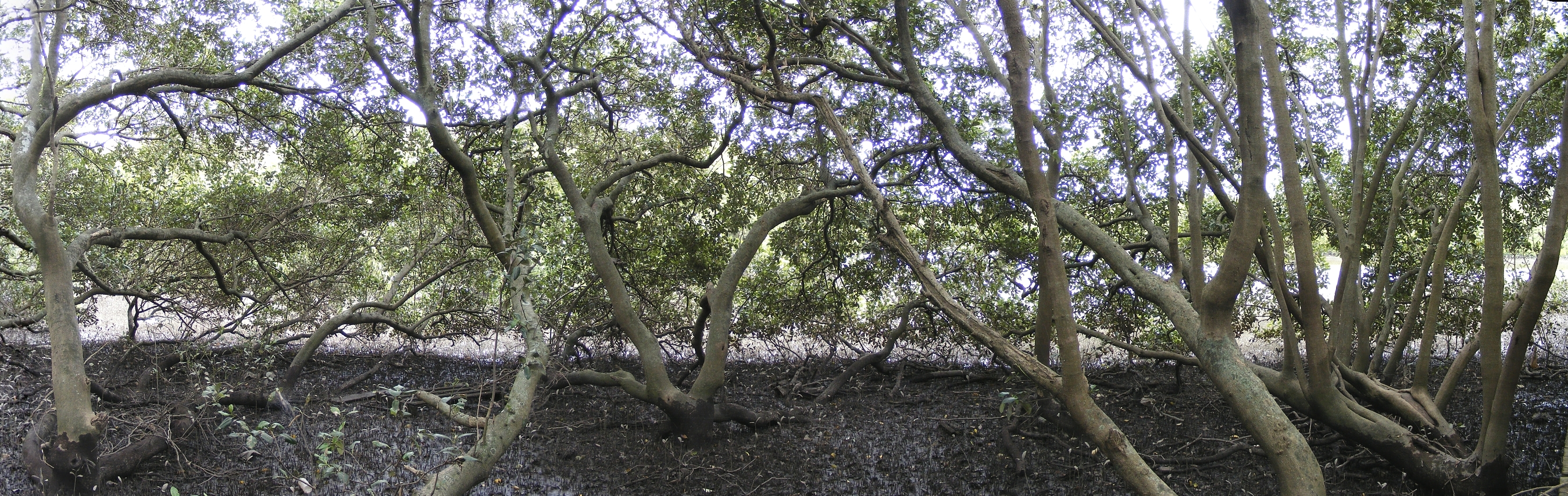
Mangroves on the shores of Salt Pan Creek

Salt Pan Creek rises west southwest of the suburb of Mount Lewis, within the City of Canterbury-Bankstown local government area, and flows generally south by east through Georges River local government area, before reaching its confluence with the Georges River, at Riverwood. The catchment area of the creek is approximately 26 square kilometres (10 sq mi), and is subject to flooding due to vegetation modification and urban development.

Vegetation in the catchment area consists of three endangered ecological species, including coastal saltmarsh, Cooks River Castlereagh Ironbark Forest, and Shale / Sandstone Transition Forest. Vegetation varies substantially throughout the catchment area and includes freshwater environments, estuarine environments, mangroves and saltmarshes, riparian and terrestrial environments, which provide important habitat for native fauna.
