= Electoral district of East Hills =

East Hills New South Wales—Legislative Assembly
- Interactive map of district boundaries from the 2023 state election
- State: New South Wales
- Dates current: 1953–present
- MP: Kylie Wilkinson
- Party: Labor
- Namesake: East Hills, New South Wales
- Electors: 55,144 (2019)
- Area: 39.55 km^{2} (15.3 sq mi)
- Demographic: Outer-metropolitan
Electorates around East Hills:
| Cabramatta; Fairfield | Auburn | Bankstown |
| Holsworthy | East Hills | Bankstown; Oatley |
| Holsworthy | Miranda | Oatley |

East Hills is a state electoral district of the Legislative Assembly in the state of New South Wales, Australia. It is represented by Labor member Kylie Wilkinson. In 2019, Wendy Lindsay succeeded Glenn Brookes after he stood down.

== Geography ==
On its current boundaries, East Hills takes in the suburbs of Condell Park, East Hills, Milperra, Padstow, Padstow Heights, Panania, Picnic Point, Revesby, Revesby Heights and parts of Bankstown, Bass Hill, Georges Hall and Yagoona.

== Members for East Hills ==
| Member | Party | Period |
|---|---|---|
| Arthur Williams | Labor | 1953–1956 |
| Joe Kelly | Labor | 1956–1973 |
| Pat Rogan | Labor | 1973–1999 |
| Alan Ashton | Labor | 1999–2011 |
| Glenn Brookes | Liberal | 2011–2016 |
| Glenn Brookes | Independent | 2016−2017 |
| Glenn Brookes | Liberal | 2017–2019 |
| Wendy Lindsay | Liberal | 2019–2023 |
| Kylie Wilkinson | Labor | 2023–present |

== Election results ==
2023 New South Wales state election: East Hills
| Party | Candidate | Votes | % | ±% |
|---|---|---|---|---|
| Labor | Kylie Wilkinson | 22,140 | 43.9 | +3.2 |
| Liberal | Wendy Lindsay | 21,996 | 43.6 | +2.1 |
| Greens | Natalie Hanna | 3,578 | 7.1 | +2.2 |
| Independent | Chris Brogan | 2,679 | 5.3 | +5.3 |
| Total formal votes | | 50,393 | 95.2 | −0.1 |
| Informal votes | | 2,544 | 4.8 | +0.1 |
| Turnout | | 52,937 | 88.7 | −0.2 |
Two-party-preferred result
| Labor | Kylie Wilkinson | 24,677 | 51.7 | +1.8 |
| Liberal | Wendy Lindsay | 23,013 | 48.3 | −1.8 |
| Labor gain from Liberal | | Swing | +1.8 | |
