= Kylie Wilkinson =

Australian politician

Kylie Wilkinson MP

Member of the New South Wales Assembly for East Hills
- Incumbent
- Assumed office 25 March 2023
- Preceded by: Wendy Lindsay

Personal details
- Party: Labor Party
- Occupation: Politician

Kylie Anne Wilkinson is an Australian politician. She was elected to the New South Wales Legislative Assembly representing East Hills for the Labor Party in 2023.

== Career ==
Wilkinson set up a women's shelter for victims of domestic violence.

In October 2023, Wilkinson signed an open letter which condemned attacks against Israeli and Palestinian civilians during the Gaza war.

== Personal life ==
Wilkinson has lived in the East Hills area for 34 years. She is mother to six children.
