= Garrison Point =

Urban park and promontory in Sydney, Australia

- Peninsula
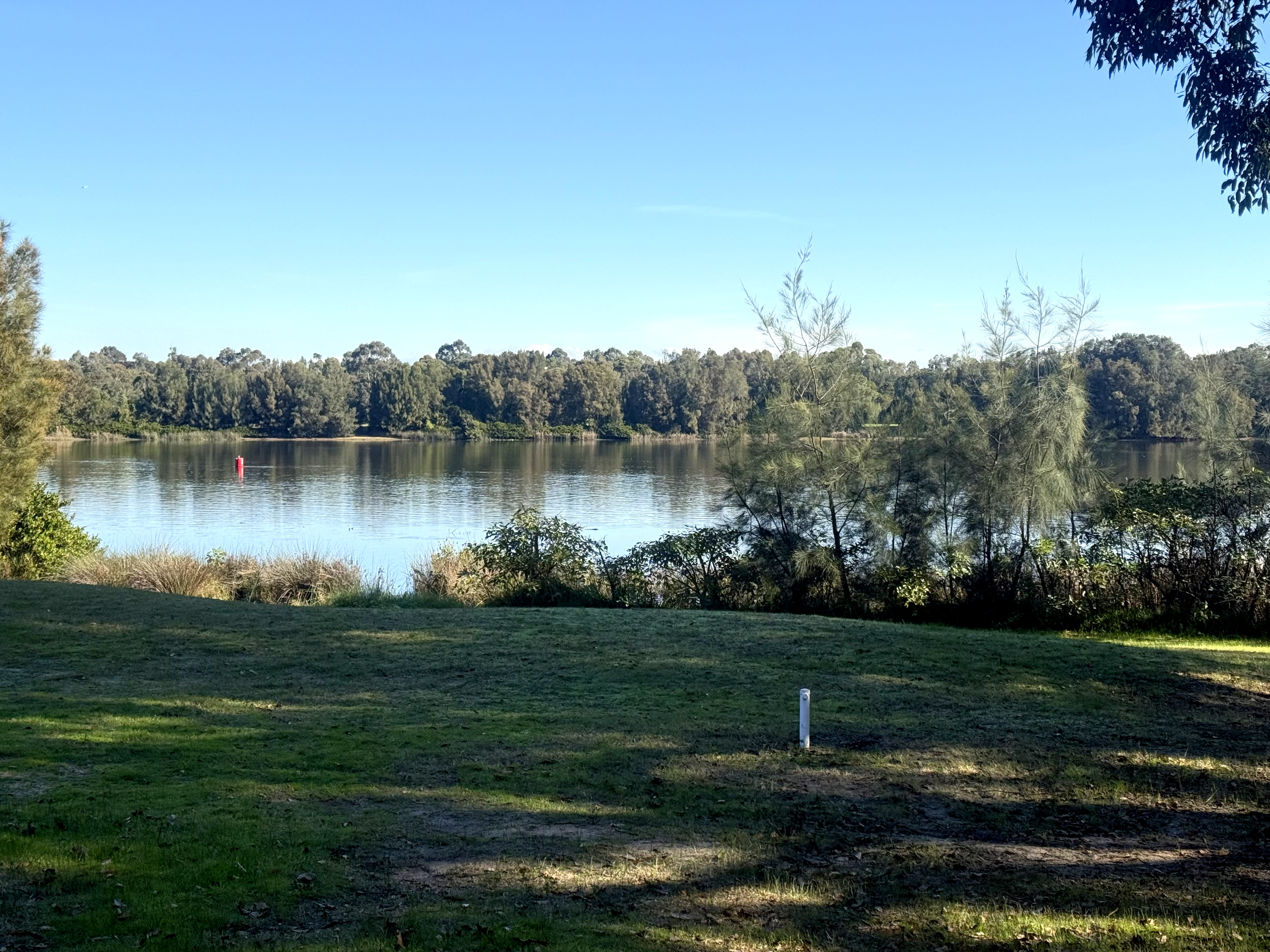
- The reedy beach at Garrison Point, where Prospect Creek flows into Dhurawal Bay on the Georges River

- Location within Sydney
- Coordinates: 33°54′26″S 150°58′23″E
- Water bodies: Georges River and Prospect Creek
- Geology: Quaternary alluvium
- Operator: City of Canterbury-Bankstown

Area
  - Total: 13.7 ha (34 acres)
- Highest elevation: 10 metres (33 ft)

Garrison Point is a headland and a historically significant urban park that is situated in Sydney, New South Wales, Australia. A peninsula within Mirambeena Regional Park, the parkland is located near the junction of Georges River and Prospect Creek, and may be accessed off Henry Lawson Drive in the South Western Sydney suburb of Georges Hall, in the City of Canterbury-Bankstown. The headland is formed by a bend in Prospect Creek, approximately 500 metres (1,600 ft) north of its confluence with the Georges River.

== History ==
In 1795 Matthew Flinders, George Bass, and the boy servant William Martin, explored the Georges River to land at what is now Garrison Point and discover the what is now part of City of Canterbury-Bankstown.The Garrison Point beach is also the site where voyagers Bass and Flinders first landed and declared the area as Bankstown. The area is so named because in Bankstown's early history, a garrison of soldiers was stationed here to ensure the safety of Major George Johnston as he conducted a census in the area.

George Johnston, a lieutenant who arrived with the First Fleet, was also granted land in the area and built his first residence on Prospect Creek, near the present-day intersection of Henry Lawson Drive and Beatty Parade, naming the property Georges Hall. A military guard was later stationed at the site, an association reflected in the name of nearby Garrison Point. Following repeated flooding, the Johnston family constructed a new residence on higher ground in 1837; the house survives in nearby Lionel Street.

== Geography ==
Garrison Point is a low-lying, flat to gently undulating riverside peninsula at the confluence of the Georges River and its tributary, Prospect Creek. It is bounded by Prospect Creek to the north and east and Dhurawal Bay on the Georges River to the west, and is shaded by native trees. River-flat eucalypt forest is the predominant ecological community along the peninsula's waterways, while a remnant patch of Cumberland Plain Woodland survives at the eastern end of the park.

The park is used for passive recreation and fitness activities, including jogging and cycling, and contains pedestrian and cycle paths, picnic shelters, barbecue facilities, playground equipment, parking, bus access, toilets, a wharf and a performance stage. It is also used for community gatherings and large public events, and formerly hosted major Australia Day civic celebrations. The beach at Garrison Point is identified as the site where explorers George Bass and Matthew Flinders first landed in the area and proclaimed it as Bankstown.

== Features ==
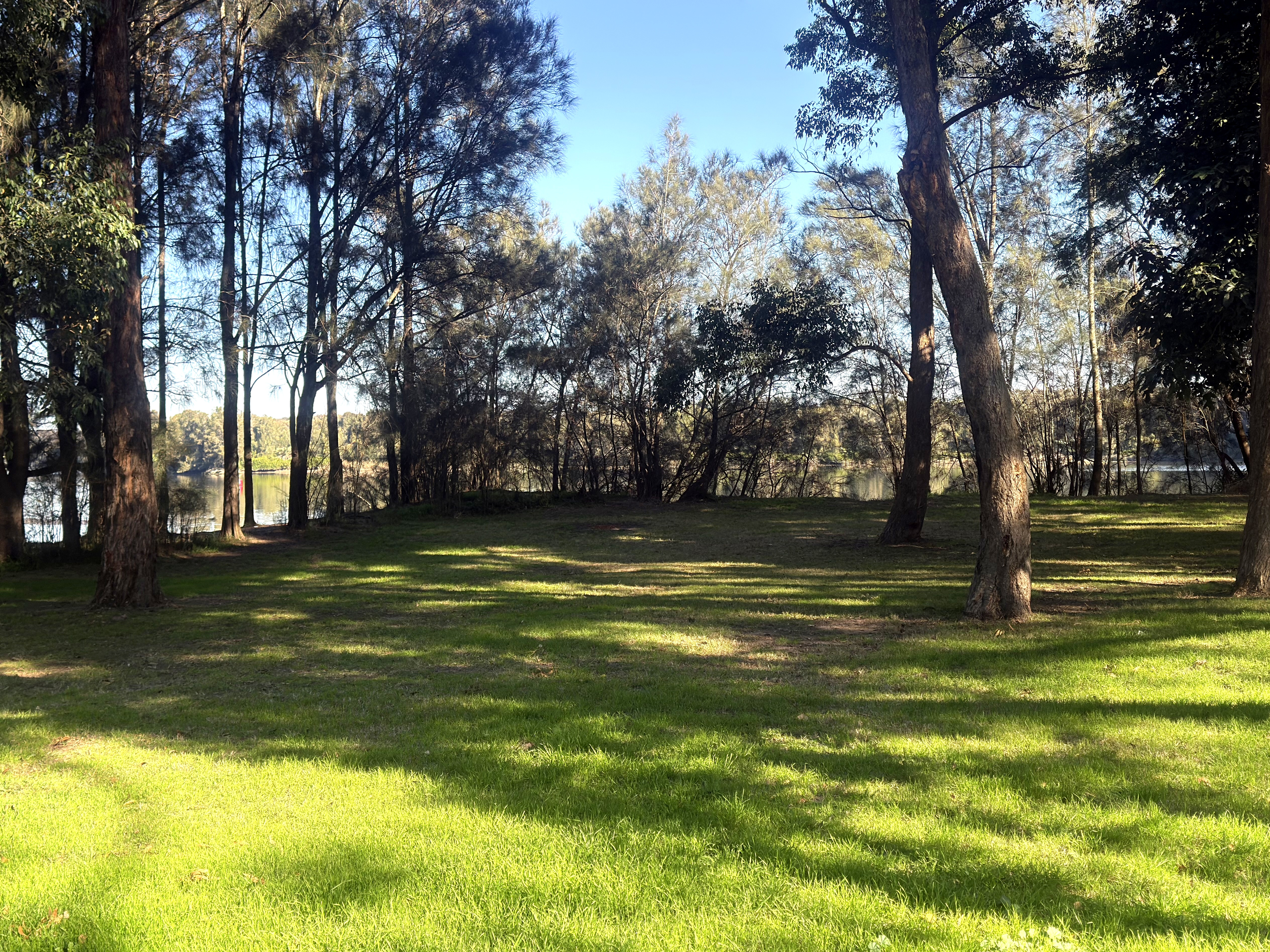
Riverside parkland, with the Georges River visible through the trees

The park features pedestrian and cycleways, picnic shelters, BBQs, children's playgrounds, large car parking and bus access, toilet block, a wharf and a performance stage. Widely used by the public, Garrison Point is the most known of the reserves, especially for larger groups and for people with disabilities. It is a popular festive site for community events where it is exceedingly used by large groups of people. Though there is poor accessibility at the timber boardwalk near the waterway. Recently, park furniture has been installed at the site. The park is also the local focus of annual Australia Day celebrations in the Bankstown area.

=== Proposals ===
Plans for Garrison Point Reserve proposed re-establishing and maintaining the beach by relocating the existing salt marsh, removing weeds, debris and mud, and adding sand to restore the shoreline and reduce erosion. The proposal also included a sandstone beach edge, facilities for launching kayaks, and a water tap for visitors to clean themselves after using the beach. New park furniture, including seating and shaded picnic tables, has been installed at Garrison Point and Lake Gillawarna, with accessibility improvements for people with disabilities. The furniture was introduced as part of a distinctive visual identity for Mirambeena Regional Park and is intended to be adopted throughout the reserve, with potential use in other parks along the Georges River. Plans also proposed installing interpretive signage near the Garrison Point beach to commemorate the landing of George Bass and Matthew Flinders, and formalising the beach with a sandstone edge.

== Gallery ==
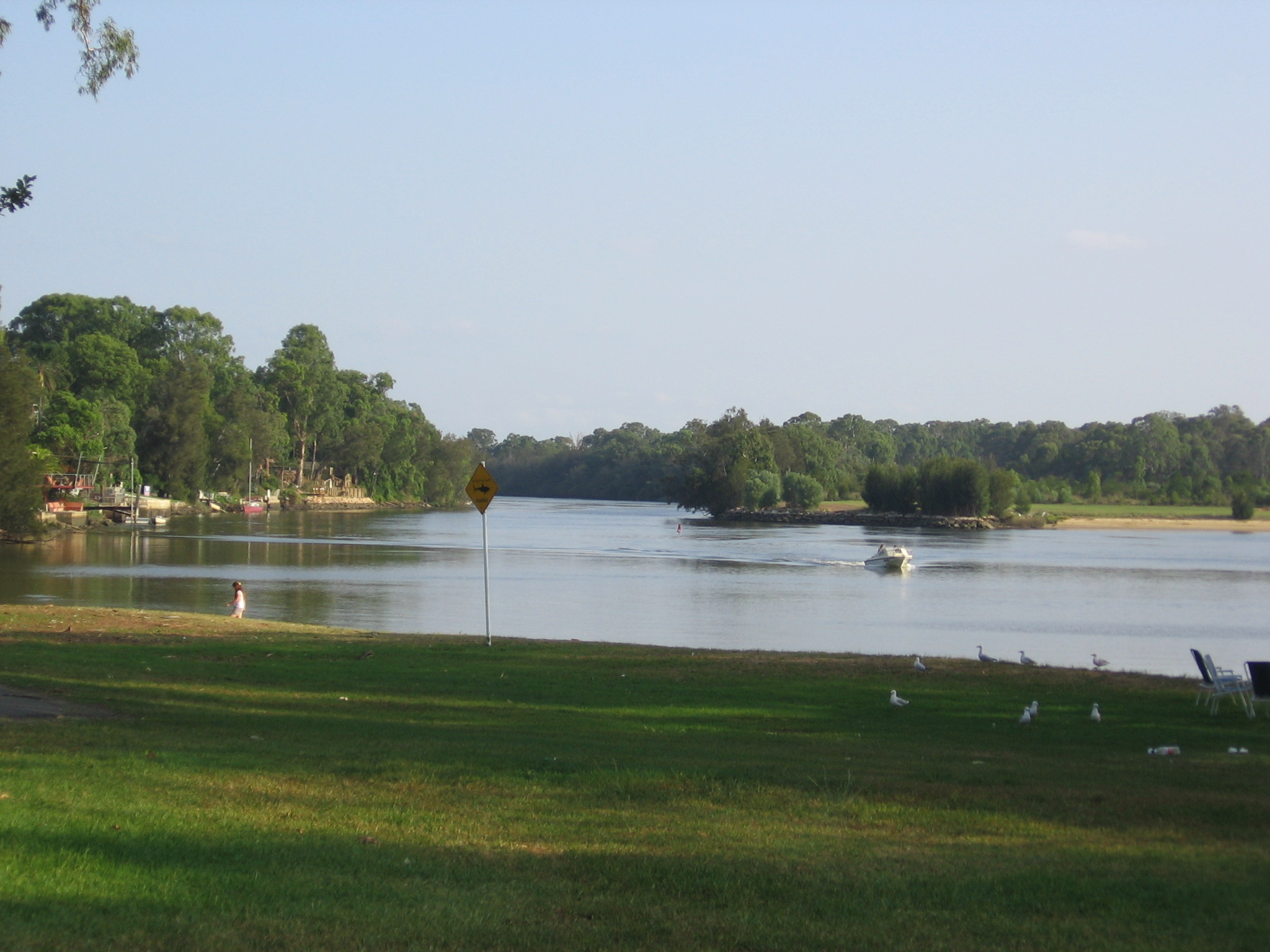
The beach in 2006, before becoming overgrown with invasive reeds

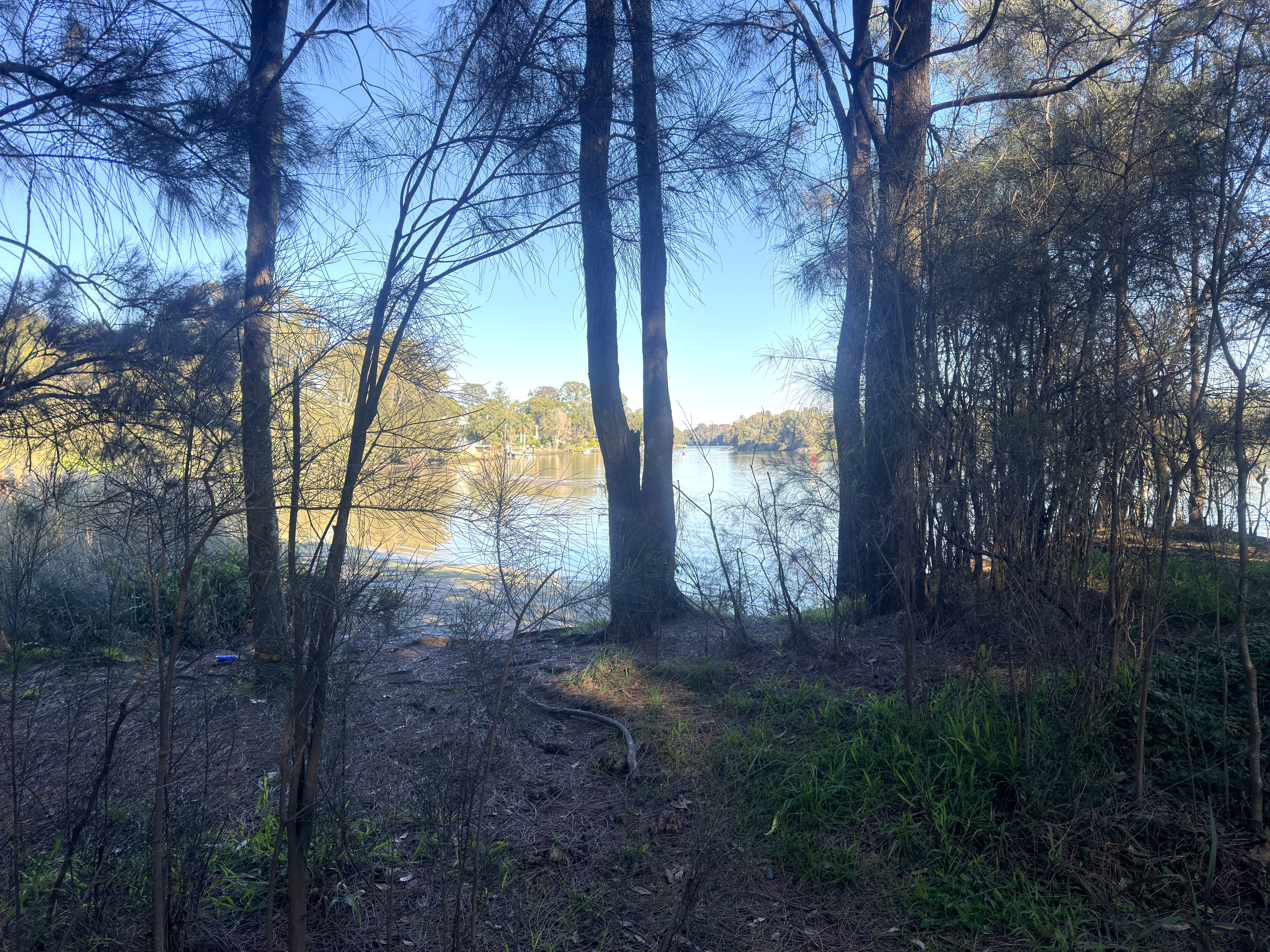
View of the beach (Georges River)

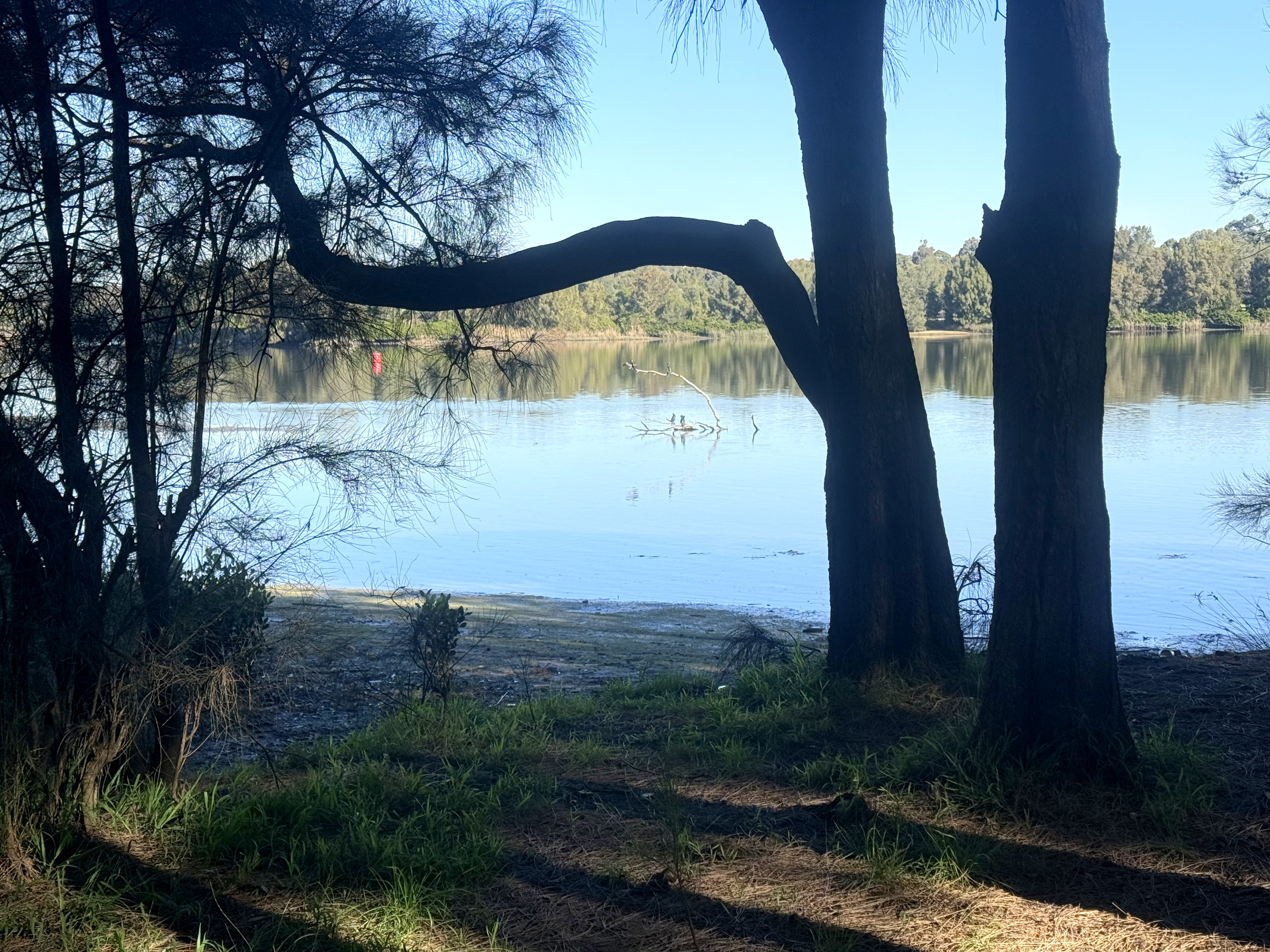
Another view of the beach

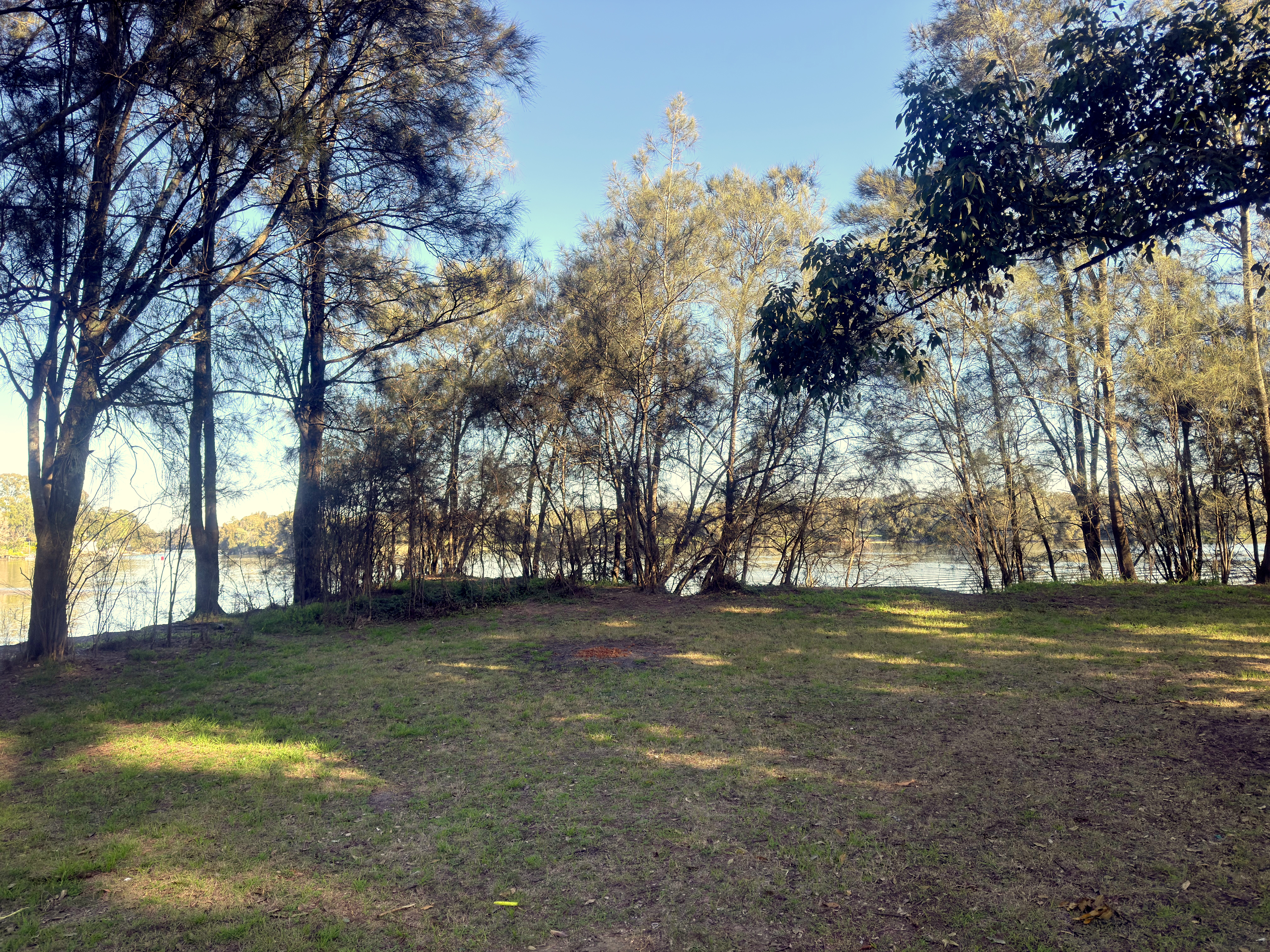
The wooded headland at Garrison Point, with the Georges River beyond

== See also ==
- Parks in Sydney
