= Meccano Set =

Overhead gantry in Sydney, Australia

Meccano Set New South Wales
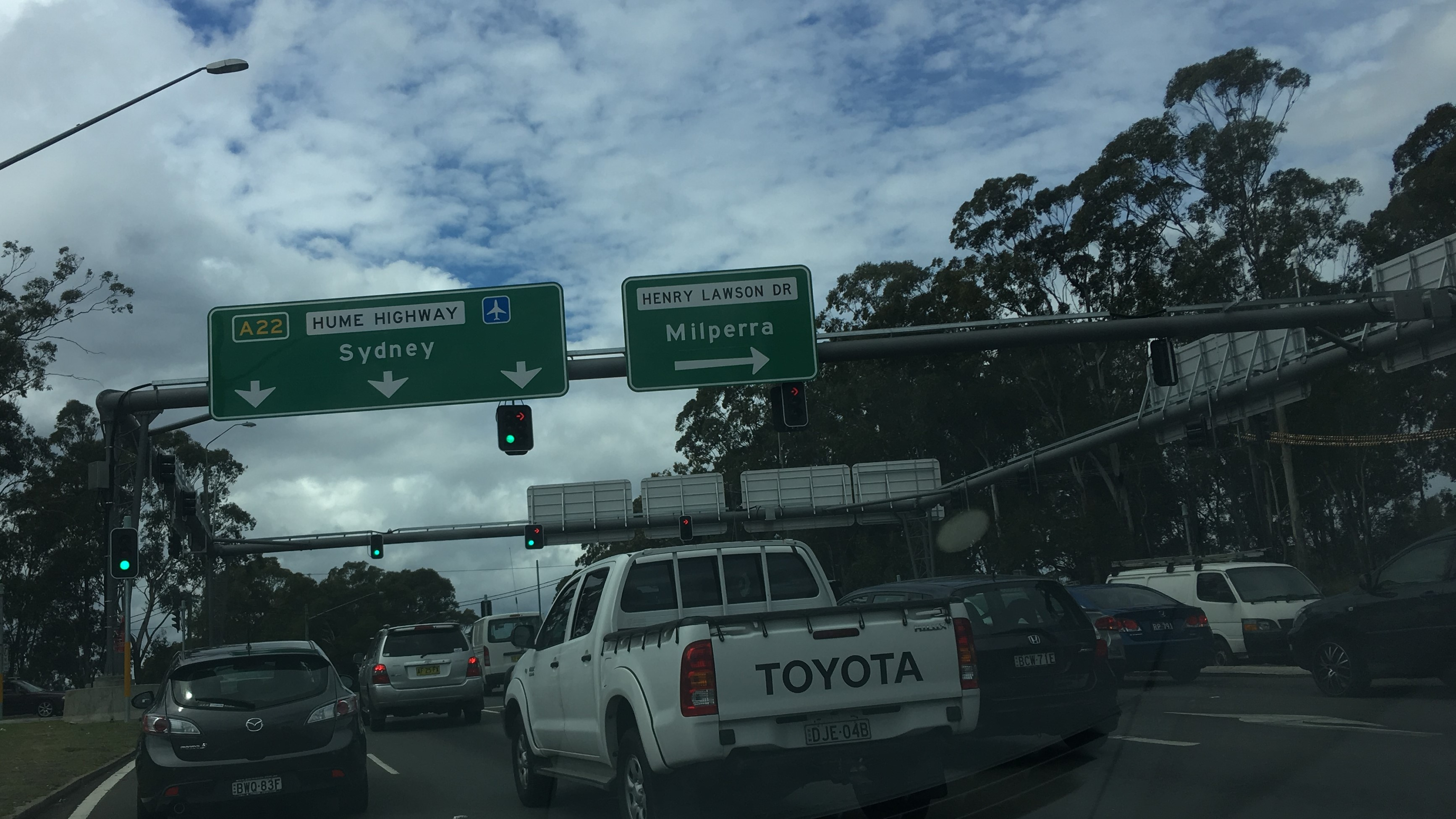

- Coordinates: 33°53′23″S 150°58′23″E

General information
- Type: Road junction
- Junction type: Controlled at-grade intersection
- Location: Lansdowne / Villawood
- Opened: December 1962
- Built by: Department of Main Roads
- Maintained by: Transport for NSW
- Roads at junction: Hume Highway (A22); Henry Lawson Drive; Woodville Road

Location(s)
- Region: Western Sydney
- LGA(s): City of Canterbury-Bankstown

The Meccano Set is an overhead gantry located above a busy controlled at-grade road intersection located at the boundary between Lansdowne and Villawood in Sydney, New South Wales, Australia. Built in 1962, the Meccano Set was proposed for demolition in 2015, but was retained after public consultation found overwhelming community support for its preservation. The structure was maintained by Roads and Maritime Services for more than 50 years. In early 2019, the overhead structure was replaced with a new identical pre-fabricated version and was completed in June 2019.

== History ==
In December 1962 a large overhead gantry with directional signs and traffic lights, was erected by the Department of Main Roads. It was quickly nicknamed the Meccano Set with reference to the children's construction toy Meccano. At that stage, the intersection was a junction for through traffic between Brisbane and Melbourne. Although this was superseded by the Cumberland Highway in August 1988, it remains an important intersection.

By 2016, the Meccano Set had deteriorated significantly after decades of exposure and ageing. Although community consultation conducted in 2015 found strong support for retaining and restoring the structure, local Member for Fairfield, Guy Zangari, criticised the New South Wales Government for delays in undertaking the planned restoration despite funding having been allocated in the 2016–17 state budget. Roads and Maritime Services stated that it was finalising plans for restoration work after considering community feedback.

== Geography ==
The intersection is a junction where the Hume Highway, Henry Lawson Drive and Woodville Road intersect. The Meccano Set serves as a gateway landmark to the City of Liverpool, City of Parramatta, City of Fairfield and City of Canterbury-Bankstown local government areas. It is also located immediately north of the Mirambeena Regional Park.

== Design ==
The Meccano Set is a distinctive steel gantry carrying overhead directional signs and traffic signals above the Hume Highway at Lansdowne. The structure, which directs traffic towards Milperra, Liverpool, Fairfield and Parramatta, derives its nickname from its resemblance to the Meccano construction toy, or Lego. The structure was constructed to improve traffic management by supporting overhead directional signs and traffic signals at the busy intersection. Although it is not heritage-listed, it has been regarded by some as a local landmark and an icon of Western Sydney.

== Reconstruction ==
In 2015, the New South Wales Government consulted the public on the future of the Hume Highway "Meccano Set", a steel gantry at the intersection of the Hume Highway, Woodville Road and Henry Lawson Drive in Lansdowne. Approximately 90% of respondents supported retaining the landmark, which had stood at the site since 1962. As a result, the government elected to replace the ageing structure with a near-identical replica. Design work commenced following the consultation, with construction beginning in January 2019 and concluding later that year.

The replacement structure was designed using 3D survey technology to accurately replicate the original 1962 gantry. Unlike the original, which had been designed using imperial measurements and fabricated from numerous welded steel plates, the new structure was prefabricated using modern engineering techniques before being transported to the site and installed over four consecutive Saturday nights in May and June 2019. The completed steel gantry consists of four rhombus-shaped beams, each 32 metres (105 ft) long and weighing approximately five tonnes, with a total weight of around 25 tonnes.
