= The Homestead (Georges Hall) =

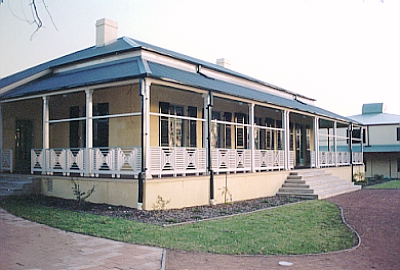
- The Homestead, in 2019

- Location within New South Wales
- 33°54′41″S 150°58′39″E
- Location: 1a Lionel Street, Georges Hall, City of Canterbury-Bankstown, New South Wales, Australia

History
- Built: 1837

Site notes
- Architectural style: Old Colonial Georgian
- Owner: Church of the Foursquare Gospel (Aust) Ltd

New South Wales Heritage Register
- Official name: Homestead, The; Georges Hall
- Type: state heritage (built)
- Designated: 2 April 1999
- Reference no.: 448
- Type: Homestead building
- Category: Residential buildings (private)

The Homestead is a large, single-storey former homestead and now school, at 1a Lionel Street, Georges Hall, New South Wales, Australia. Built by David Johnston in 1837, the homestead was also known as Georges Hall. The property is owned by Church of the Foursquare Gospel (Aust) Ltd.

It was added to the New South Wales State Heritage Register on 2 April 1999; and on 21 March 1978 was added to a non-statutory list, the now-defunct Register of the National Estate.

== History of the area ==
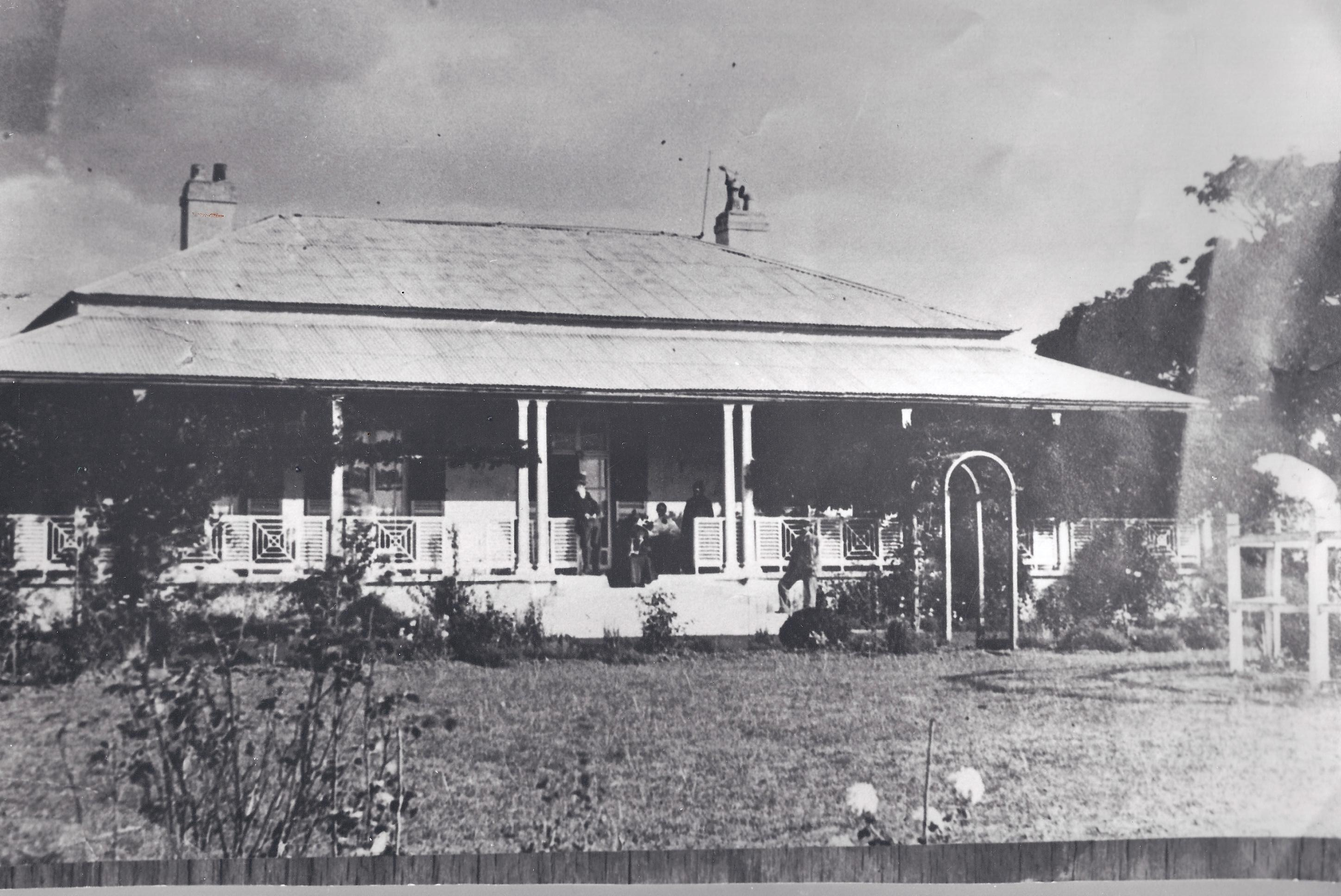
The Homestead, 1915

On 6 April 1798, George Johnston received a land grant of 172 acres (70 ha) in the district from Governor Hunter. The grant was made up of a number of parcels of land including 12 acres (4.9 ha) at Marquee Point, 70 acres (28 ha) adjacent to "Strongs Farm" and 90 acres (36 ha) above "Red Bank".

It was on the 12-acre lot at Marquee Point, at the junction of Prospect Creek and the Georges River that Johnston built a simple timber farmhouse building. It was known as Georges Hall. It became an unofficial military outpost and in 1801 it was reported that there were no less than one sergeant and four privates stationed there. A further 60 acres (24 ha) were granted to Johnston in 1804. George Johnston spent most of his time at his large family home known as Annandale. George Johnston died in 1823 and his son David inherited the Georges Hall property, known as Johnston's Flat and the upper farm or David Banks.

David Johnston married Selina Willey in February 1836 and the couple resided in Georges Hall. However, the land was prone to flooding and it is likely that this led to the construction in 1837 of a new house called Georges Hall, today known as The Homestead. By 1837, 100 acres (40 ha) had been cleared and 30 acres (12 ha) cultivated.

David and his wife lived at Georges Hall until his death in 1886, three years after his wife. In his will David left his large land holdings to be divided between his children by the Trustees. Two sons, George Robert and Arthur Alfred inherited the Georges River Estates, consisting of 1,064 acres (431 ha), as joint tenants. In 1876 an agreement was made between the brothers that should either of the two pass away the surviving party had the option to buy the other party's share at current market values. It appears that following the death of George, Arthur purchased George's share.

Arthur continued to reside at Georges Hall with his wife until he died in 1907 when he was found in his bedroom having shot himself with a pea rifle. His wife, Maria inherited the property and remained at Georges Hall. In 1912, two additional rooms were added at the south-west corner and other external alterations were made to the house. The property was gradually subdivided and in 1913 the Georgetown Estate was formed. Ralph Johnston controlled the 100-acre property until 1917 when it was sold to Henry Crossing a grazier from Pilliga.

James William Ashcroft and his wife Amelia purchased the property in 1920 residing there for only two years until James Ashcroft's death in 1922. It was then sold to Robert Harvey Layton and during this time the remaining 100 acres was subdivided and a subdivision planned known as the Deepwater Estate.

Layton sold much of the Deepwater Estate including the lot on which the original Georges Hall stood. In 1948 the After Care Association purchased Georges hall for use as a hostel for elderly women. The name "The Homestead" appears to have come into use by 1946 when a valuation of the house and grounds was conducted. The Association spent £2000 on renovations and other necessary alterations including additional bathing facilities. The addition on the south side was removed sometime between 1949 and 1991.

In the late 1950s it was decided to build a men's hostel on adjacent land and to finance the project, the 14 lots of land around The Homestead were auctioned off during 1960–61.

In 1991, the Calvary Gospel Church (later Causeway Church) moved their school onto the site's northern side. Through funding from the Heritage Assistance Program, restoration and archaeological work was undertaken during 1992 and 1993. The interior front two rooms and entry lobby/hallway were adaptively reused as Church meeting and relaxation rooms prior to 2006, with two fireplaces installed in spaces where original (removed) fireplaces had been. Chimneys were blocked up to prevent water entry. The school is now known as HopePoint Christian School.

== The house ==
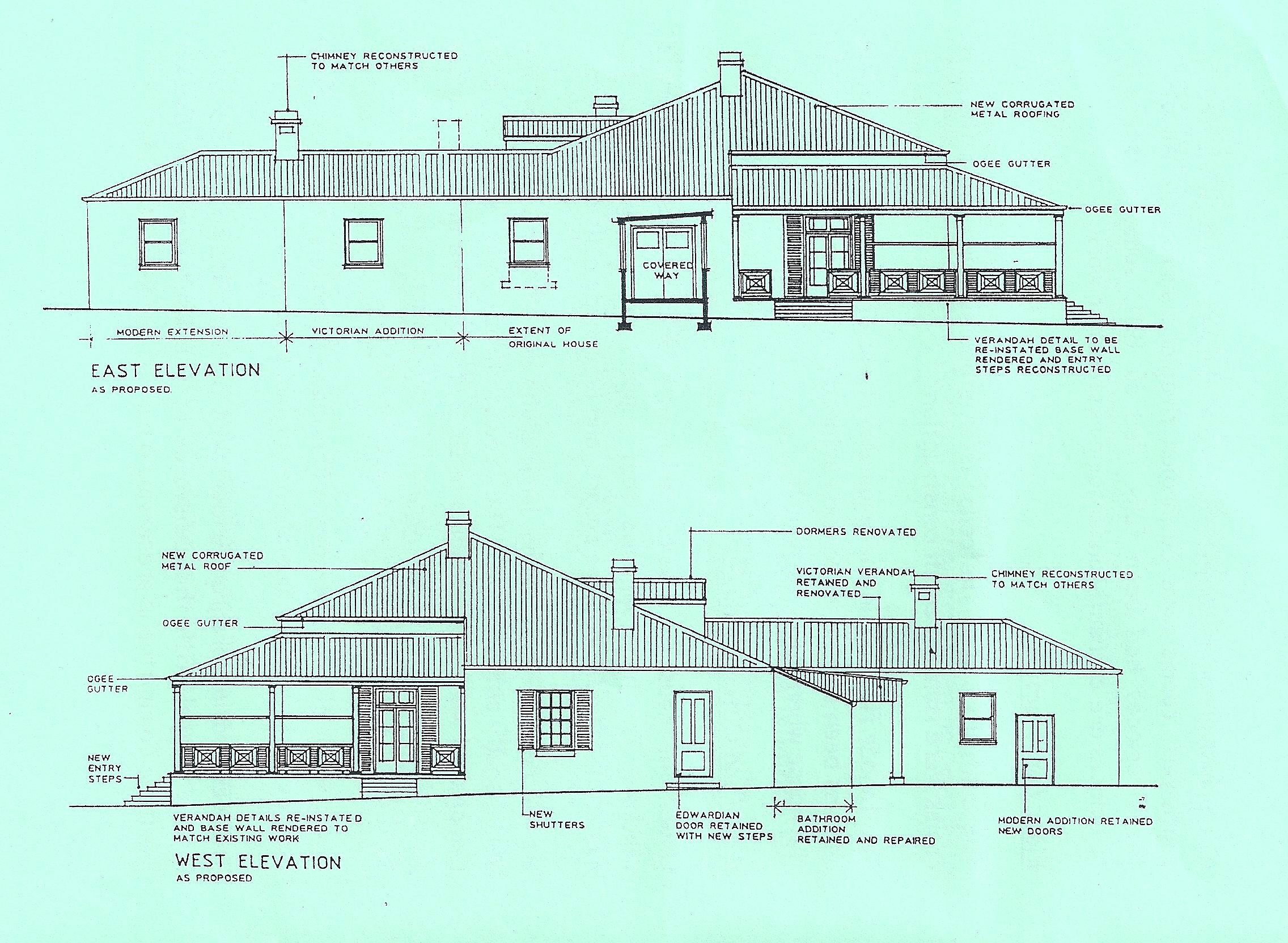
Original plans of The Homestead Georges Hall NSW

The Homestead built in 1837, is the oldest remaining building in the Bankstown district and is evidence of the earliest permanent settlement in the district. The building being substantially intact, it is a well-proportioned and finely detailed Old Colonial Georgian-styled homestead with strong links to Australia's early colonial history through its original owners and residents the Johnston family of Annandale.

It was the second Johnston house built on this land with the first house being affected by flooding. Its location on the rise above the river and floodplain, demonstrates the settlers' adaptation to their environment, standing on ground above Henry Lawson Drive in Lionel Street, and was the home of the Johnston family until 1917.

While the architect and builder are unknown, The Homestead that David Johnston built is typical of many Colonial Georgian country homes with a low pitch all-encompassing roof and a detached return verandah form on an elevated masonry base. Stuccoed brick construction on sandstone foundations enclosing extensive cellars. Floor and roof are of pit sawn timbers fastened by hand forged nails. The original part of the house is of symmetrical design with wide verandahs to three sides enclosing four large rooms, a hall and pantry. Two additional rooms added at south west corner. The attic has four large rooms lit by attractive dormers having arched transoms with curved glazing bars. This pattern is repeated in the fine fanlight over the south door. The interior joinery is cedar with extensive panelled window reveals, dados and built-in cupboards. Doors are all six panelled and windows either twelve pane sash type or French windows with transoms above. Windows are all shuttered, including the unusual front French door with narrow sidelights. Verandas are massively constructed of timber with an unusual tall skillion pitch over the cellar entrance. There are some fine marble chimney pieces and Edwardian timber ones in later additions. The roof is now covered with Marseilles pattern tiles and Edwardian brackets have been added to the veranda posts but the house is otherwise intact and in very good condition. The original kitchen wing has possibly been incorporated within later additions. All other outbuildings have been demolished.

Even in its reduced curtilage today, the house retains its traditional relationship to Prospect Creek (over Kentucky Reserve, Henry Lawson Drive and the Murrumbeena Regional Park to Dhurawal Bay), and to the site of the earlier homestead (lost due to regular flooding).

The original Johnson property is now within Kentucky Reserve by Dhurawal Bay. Within that reserve, three large old English Oaks, (Quercus robur) remain which may date to the military use of the site or to the first homestead site. These are now fenced off within the reserve near Lake Mirrambeena.

The estate (in much reduced form) is relatively intact, in particular the immediate surrounds of the homestead, its relationship to the river, and some remnant landscape elements such as early plantings or their progeny. A recreated carriage loop is on the site of the old one in front of the house. The rose garden and fence were reinstated in 1992/93.

The carriage loop and enframing trees (plantings and natural) provide some sympathetic setting for the house. Species include spotted gum (Corymbia maculata), forest red gum (Eucalyptus tereticornis), Brazilian pepper tree (Schinus molle) (one tree to the rear of the house could be as old as the house), white cedar (Melia azederach var. australasica), camphor laurel (Cinnomomum camphora) and Hill's/weeping fig, (Ficus hillii). A trumpet creeper (Campsis grandiflora) twines up the trunks of the pepper trees, again a common plant in 19th century gardens of this type.

The physical condition of the property was reported as good as at 24 September 1997.

Outbuildings, including a dairy, no longer survive. The coach house and stables were demolished in the 1920s.

The estate is relatively intact in a much reduced form, in particular the immediate surrounds of the homestead, its relationship to the river, and some remnant landscape elements such as early plantings or their progeny, and a recreated carriage loop on the site of the old one. The rose garden and fence were reinstated in 1992/93.

=== Exterior ===
The building is a well-proportioned symmetrical rectangular mass modulated by timber columns and a regularly spaced window pattern. The principal chimneys reinforced the symmetry of the building which was centred on a circular carriage drive. The front entry was orientated 20 degrees west of north and had extensive views down to the Georges River and beyond. Additions and extensions have altered the rear of the house.

=== Foundations ===
The house is built on a raised plinth over a partly excavated cellar. While most of the cellar is built of brick, the main walls at the rear and the front of the house are sandstone. The building is founded on a clay or shale base and the cellar is subject to a rising water table.

=== Walls ===
Wall construction was the finest quality sandstock bricks of a red and blue mottle and laid in lime mortar. The exterior walls were stuccoed and lined to imitate. The principal rooms contain fine stone chimney pieces while the south - west rooms have Edwardian fireplace surrounds. All of the fireplaces had been fully tiled c. 1911; these fireplaces have been restored.

=== Floor construction ===
The central floor of the cellar is of stone flagging while the side rooms were rammed earth construction. The original timber flooring in the house has been sanded, oiled and restored to their original condition.

=== Cellar and outer buildings ===
Under the house is a large cellar with brick arches and barred windows. The huge windows that support the building show the marks of the adaze and the square, and handmade nails can be seen.

At the rear of the building, large slabs are all that remain of the demolished outbuildings. The coach house and the stables, although now demolished, were still intact in 1923; a curve in Beale Street shows how the street was aligned to avoid them when part of the estate was subdivided as the Deepwater Estate. While many alterations have been made, they have not obscured the line of the original building.

The restoration program undertaken by the Church of the Four Square Gospel, with the assistance of Bankstown City Council Heritage Committee, is preserving part of the local heritage.

=== Roof ===
The roof which was framed in pit sawn hardwood framing with purlins and struts onto internal walls and chimneys. Originally shingled with hand split oak shingles the roof was subsequently covered in corrugated iron, and then later terracotta tiles. The unusual half second storey breaks the roof structure into two along the centre of the house providing the support at the ridge between the two principal chimneys. The verandah is roofed separately at a lower pitch.

The earliest photographic records of the house date from circa 1860. No photos of the extensive outer buildings exist and none of these buildings have survived. Photos from the 1890s show the front of the house and the ring or central garden area surrounded by a carriage drive, some of the Johnston family are believed to have been buried in this garden. These photographs were used to recreate the original verandah details that were removed when extensive alterations were made to the house by Henry Crossing in 1917 when he purchased the house.

The Crossings and later the Beans tried to update the property by re-roofing with terracotta tiles and replacing the verandah details with Art Nouveau columns and brackets.

=== Wall finishes ===
The internal walls were plastered and electricity installed when Mr. Bean owned the property.

=== Joinery ===
The cedar panelling inside the house is intact (the cedar believed to have come from the Johnston holdings on the south coast at Albion Park). The panelling consists of six panelled doors and twelve panel windows. The French doors to the main rooms have magnificent glazing and fixed highlights. The semi-circular fan light at the rear door and the unusual gothic sashes of the attic windows are fine examples of the influence of Regency design.

The steep and narrow staircase leading to the attic bedrooms is typical of the style of colonial stairs built in this period. Large double door sets opening of the entry hall were seen in a number of houses of the period.

All the openings are shuttered externally and have splayed cedar linings internally.

== Heritage listing ==
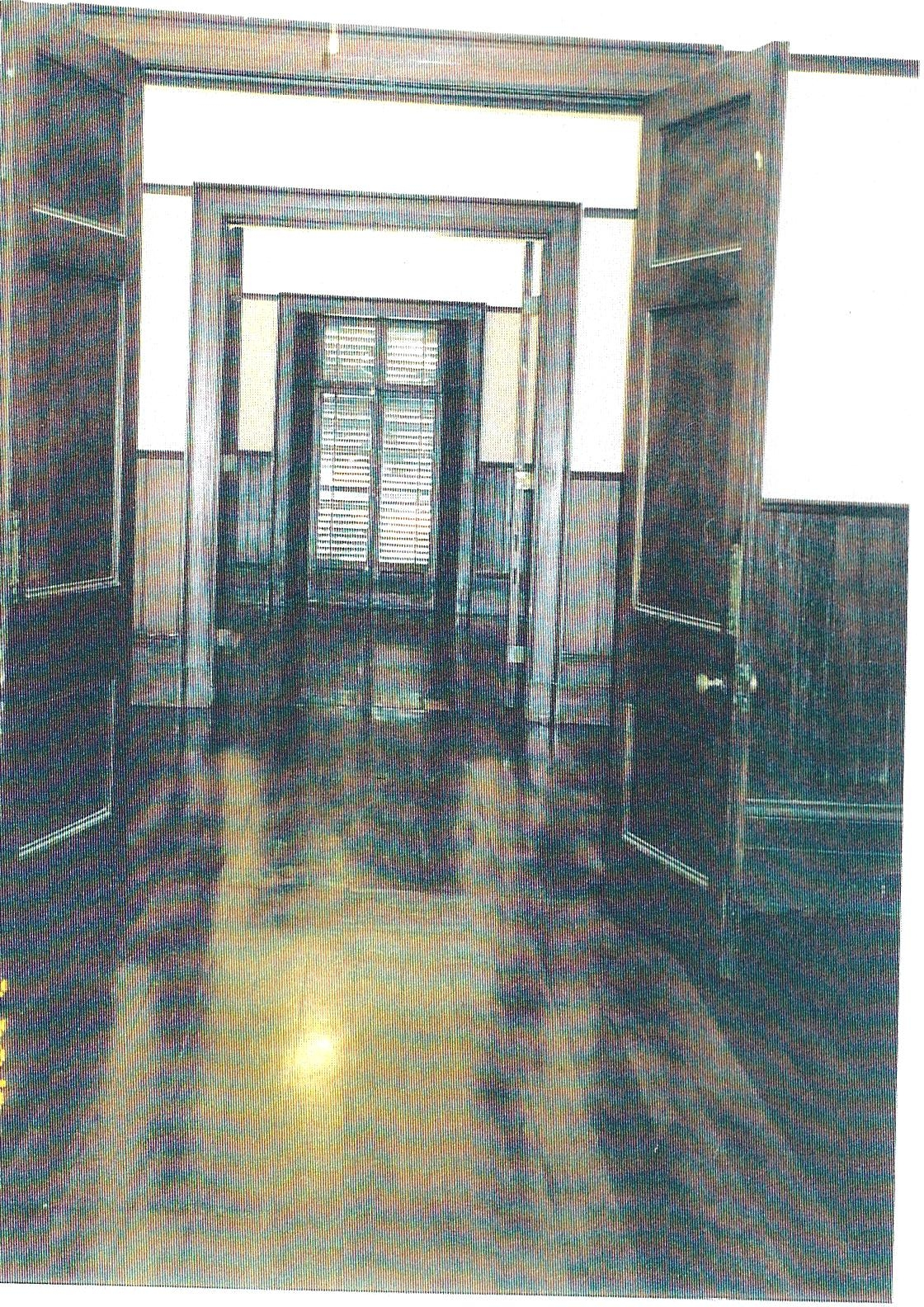
Interior view, circa 1970s

It is a fine example of Australian Georgian architecture and retains many of its former qualities and characteristics typical of its period and style. It has important associations with the renowned Johnston family. It was the second Johnston house built on this land with the first house being affected by flooding. Its location on the rise above the river and floodplain, demonstrates the settlers' adaptation to their environment. The Homestead is the earliest remaining house in the Bankstown district. It is also evidence of the earliest permanent settlement in the area.

The Homestead was listed on the New South Wales State Heritage Register on 2 April 1999 having satisfied the following criteria.

The place is important in demonstrating the course, or pattern, of cultural or natural history in New South Wales.

It has important associations with the Johnston family. It was the second Johnston house built on this land with the first house being affected by flooding. Its location on the rise above the river and floodplain, demonstrates the settlers adaption to their environment. The homestead is the earliest remaining house in the Bankstown district. It is also evidence of the earliest permanent settlement in the area.

The place has a strong or special association with a person, or group of persons, of importance of cultural or natural history of New South Wales's history.

It is associated with the man and family of officer of the Marines Lieutenant, later Major George Johnson, also of "Annandale", to whom the land was granted, his wife Esther Abrahams (Julian), sons George Johnson (jnr) (d.1823), David (who inherited the estate), his wife Selina Willey, their eight children (all had at George's Hall) including two sons who inherited the estate, George and Arthur, Arthur's wife Maria, Ralph Johnson.

It is also associated with the Military, being an unofficial army base in the district.

It is also associated with later owners, being Henry Crossing, James and Amelia Ashcroft, Robert Layton, the After Care Association who ran an elderly women's hostel on site, and now with the Calgary Church.

The place is important in demonstrating aesthetic characteristics and/or a high degree of creative or technical achievement in New South Wales.

It is a fine example of Australian Georgian architecture and retains many of its former qualities and characteristics typical of its period and style.

Even in its reduced curtilage today, the house retains its traditional relationship to Prospect Creek, the site of the first Johnson land grant and the first homestead. A recreated carriage loop in front of the house, and enframing trees (plantings and natural) provide some sympathetic setting for the house. And some demonstration of common plants in 19th century gardens of this type.

The place possesses uncommon, rare or endangered aspects of the cultural or natural history of New South Wales.

It is the earliest remaining house in the Bankstown district.

The place is important in demonstrating the principal characteristics of a class of cultural or natural places/environments in New South Wales.

The house and its curtilage, although reduced, are a good representative example of early gentry estates in South West Sydney, on early land grants to non-convicts. Many elements remain that are typical, including a circular carriage loop, the relationship of the homestead to the river/transport route, typical plantings of both exotic and remnant indigenous flora, and Georgian architecture and detailing.

== See also ==
- List of historic homesteads in Australia
