= Mirambeena Regional Park =

Park in New South Wales, Australia

Coordinates: 33.902635°S 150.978855°E

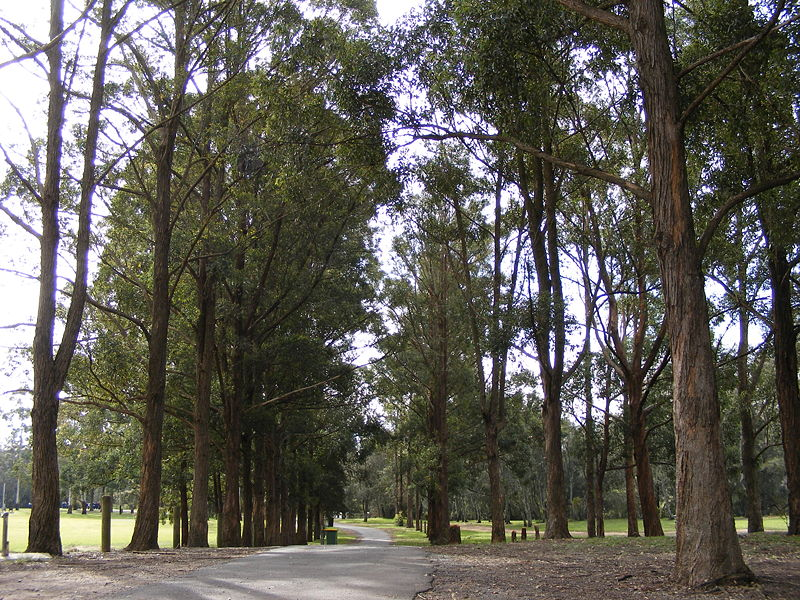
- One of the many walking tracks within the reserve
- Interactive map of Mirambeena Regional Park
- Type: Urban park, wildlife park, nature reserve
- Location: Georges Hall
- Area: 20 ha (49 acres)
- Elevation: 10–50 metres (33–164 ft)
- Owner: NSW National Parks and Wildlife Service
- Status: Open all year

The Mirambeena Regional Park, also known as Mirambeena Regional Reserve, is an urban park system and a nature reserve within the suburbs of Georges Hall and Lansdowne in Sydney, New South Wales, Australia. It features recreational parks and nature reserves bounded by the Prospect Creek to the west and Henry Lawson Drive to the east.

Mirambeena Regional Reserve functions as a regional parkland, regional trail, a river access and as a conservation area. The Regional Parkland consists of the five parks, such as, Garrison Point and Lake Gillawarna in Georges Hall; and Flinders Slopes, Shortland Brush and Lansdowne Reserve in Lansdowne, all of which attract visitors from across Sydney and the broader encompassing regions.

== History ==
For over 30,000 years, the area that was once part of the modern parkland was the traditional land of the Gweagal, Bidjigal and Dharug tribes. In 1795 George Bass and Matthew Flinders both explored the land near the Georges River and at the site of today's Garrison Point, Georges Hall declared the area as Bankstown, to honour Sir Joseph Banks. Lieutenant of the First Fleet Captain George Johnston received a land grant and constructed his first home located near Prospect Creek, close to Henry Lawson Drive and Beatty Parade, where he named it Georges Hall. The following posting of a military guard at the site is echoed in the present-day name of Garrison Point. In 1800, just beside Prospect Creek, Lieutenant John Shortland from the First Fleet acquired an initial grant of 100 acres over the northern part of Lansdowne Reserve which he increased to 380 acres (154ha).

In 1922, plans were arranged to separate the whole estate, and today many of the current tracks in the reserves reflect the former subdivision design. In the 1920s, the Railways Department operated special weekend excursion trains to the area, bringing visitors from Sydney CBD to attractions including Latty's Pleasure Grounds and Lansdowne Reserve. Further downstream on Prospect Creek, near its confluence with the Georges River, Hollywood Park emerged as another well-known picnic destination. In 1924, the Cabramatta-Canley Vale Council purchased the site under the leadership of Mayor Jacob Cook. During the Great Depression, however, rising maintenance costs and a Board of Health directive requiring improved toilet and ablution facilities placed a financial burden on the council. The site was subsequently leased, and new facilities, including a dance hall, an ambulance station and a swimming pool, were constructed, attracting large crowds despite the economic hardship of the period. In 1934, the Lang Labor government restricted transport services to pleasure grounds, contributing to the decline of Hollywood Park. Although the reserve was subsequently taken over by the Sergeant group, it never regained its former prominence.

Most of the land that constitutes the Reserve eventuated from the advice of the Cumberland Plain Planning Scheme of 1945 and ensuing government optional land purchase schemes of flood affected properties beside Prospect Creek after significant flooding events along the creek and the Georges River, especially in 1956. From the mid 1970s, the previous Bankstown Council started to develop the parklands in their current nature with the establishment of artificial ponds in Lansdowne Reserve, Shortland Brush and Lake Gillawarna. In this period, just two private properties persisted in the parklands in the northern division of Lansdowne Reserve.

== Geography ==
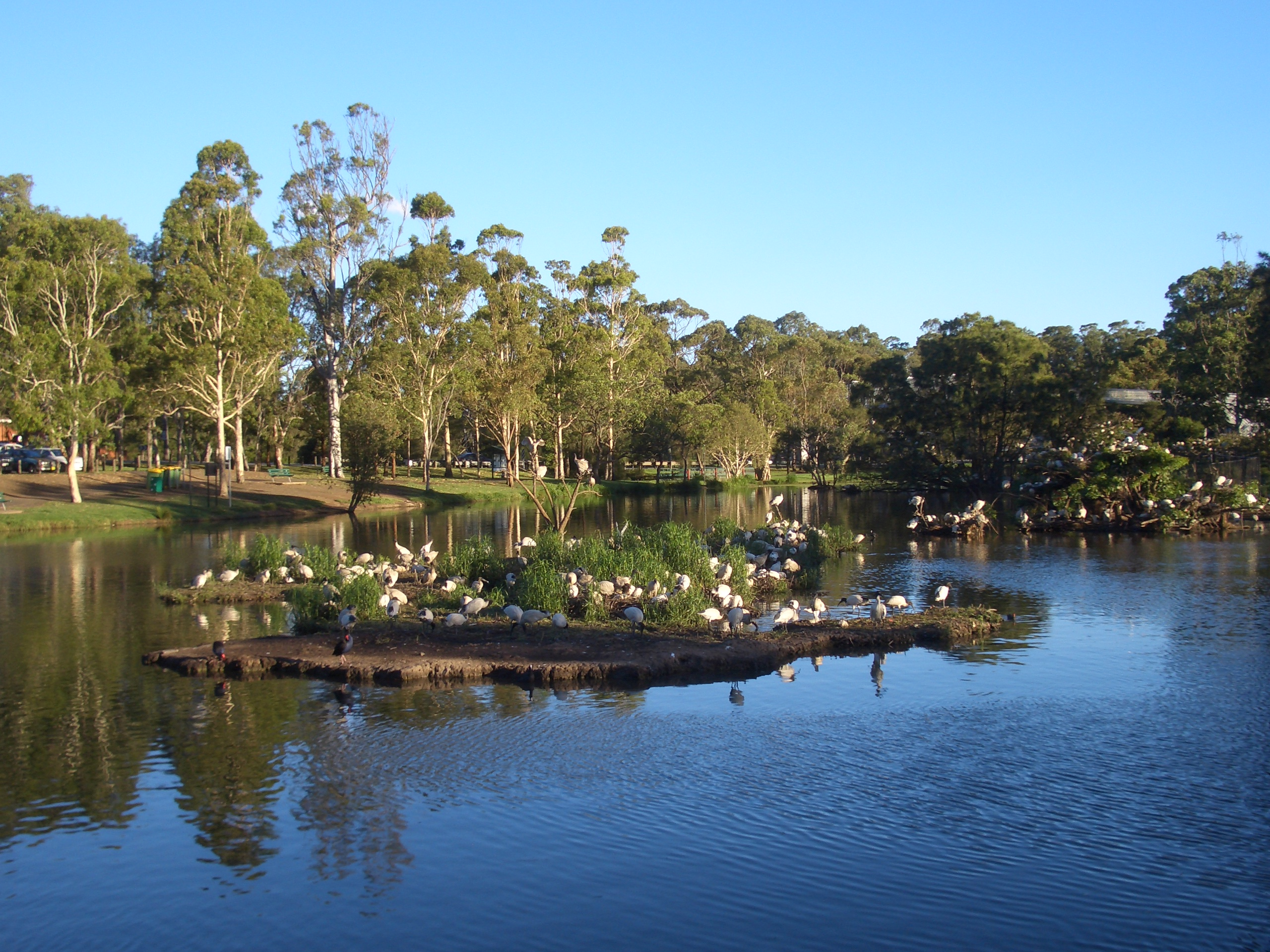
Ibis colony in Lake Gillawarna at Georges Hall

Lansdowne Reserve is the largest reserve in the park system, and Amaroo Reserve is the smallest; both are situated on the eastern side of Henry Lawson Drive. The other four parks which are Garrison Point, Lake Gillawarna, Flinders Slopes and Shortland Brush are situated between the western side of the Henry Lawson Drive and eastern side of Prospect Creek, one of Georges River tributaries. Henry Lawson Drive is a barrier between the aforementioned reserves, with the only official pedestrian access being an overhead, shared pedestrian and cycle bridge that joins Amaroo Reserve to Lake Gillawarna.

The reserve features a cycle track, play areas, wetlands, sportsgrounds, picnics, natural bushland and walking tracks. There are also lookouts, an amphitheater, electric barbeque spots, cross and country tracks. Water quality in the lakes and ponds has been depraved due to stormwater pollution, bad stormwater runoff and shortage of maintenance. Most of the park is in high flood risk zone and its structures have been built to withstand flooding.

The reserve features two threatened plant species, one threatened flora population and ten threatened animal species. Moreover, fifty-five threatened species and six migratory bird species have been recorded in the park. Main tree species, remnant of the Cumberland Plain Woodland and River-flat eucalypt forests, include: Eucalyptus microcorys, Eucalyptus maculata, Casuarina glauca, Lophostemon confertus and Corymbia citriodora. There is also a small portion of Sydney Freshwater Wetlands and Cooks River/Castlereagh Ironbark Forest in the parkland.

=== Parks ===
- Lansdowne Reserve is the largest of the parks and is principally managed as a nature conservation zone that includes a registered BioBank site and features a vegetation canopy that offers strong enclosure and shading for visitors. Moreover, its regenerating woodland is in somewhat good condition, though there exists weed invasion near drainage lines and the limits of the park, which originate from the adjacent properties and roadways. This area features a 2.1 km sealed standard cycling track, an artificial lake, a remote-control car track, picnic shelters and a public toilet block. The bike circuit has served both local and regional competitions, where it accommodated three cycling clubs.
- Garrison Point is a low lying, flat riverside peninsula positioned where the Georges River meets the tributary of Prospect Creek that features shaded trees that makes it popular festive site for community events where it is exceedingly used by large groups of people, in addition to be the most publicly known of the reserves. The site also hosted major public celebrations for Australia Day. The Garrison Point beach is also the site where voyagers Bass and Flinders first landed and declared the area as Bankstown.
- Amaroo Reserve acts as an important entrance point to the reserve for the surrounding residents with an elevated pedestrian and cycle bridge that links this site across Henry Lawson Drive to Lake Gillawarna. The site features an open drainage canal and a gross pollutant trap (GPT) aids in enhancing water quality by removing waste.
- Lake Gillawarna is low elevated, flat to somewhat undulating parkland that is situated between Henry Lawson Drive and Prospect Creek and set within a structure of wetland ponds with walking and cycling paths and picnic shelters. The area is also known for the large group of Australian ibis that nest on the islands in the lakes.
- Flinders Slopes and Shortland Brush are long, thin stretch of parklands located between Prospect Creek and Henry Lawson Drive which feature highly dense native trees on undulating and elevated areas with steep slopes that provide panoramic views of the region. Shortland Brush contains a large artificial pond, in addition to recreational facilities, and Flinders Slopes has a grassed amphitheater.

== Access ==
The Mirambeena Regional Reserve is crucial when it comes to regional connections through cycleways, pedestrian footpaths and automobile links to other areas of the City and local government areas such as Liverpool City Council and Fairfield City Council. There are several pedestrian and cycle tracks across reserve. Pedestrian access to Lansdowne Reserve is accessible from the east at Lucinda Ave, through Brooke, Kirrily and Boggabilla Reserves. The comprehensive path system across the park is part of the more extensive Georges River recreation track that spans from the Hume Highway in the north near Prospect Creek and the Georges River to the south for about 9 km to East Hills. There is also a path to the Duck River trail.

Vehicular access is from Henry Lawson Drive, and they are well maintained with carpark zones and entry signage. Lansdowne Reserve features an unofficial carpark on Henry Lawson Drive. Amaroo Reserve does not have an assigned carparking zone. Public transport is broadly inadequate with no bus routes on Henry Lawson Drive. Though bus stops near Amaroo Avenue offer access to Amaroo Reserve and to Lake Gillawarna through the pedestrian flyover on Henry Lawson Drive.

== Gallery ==
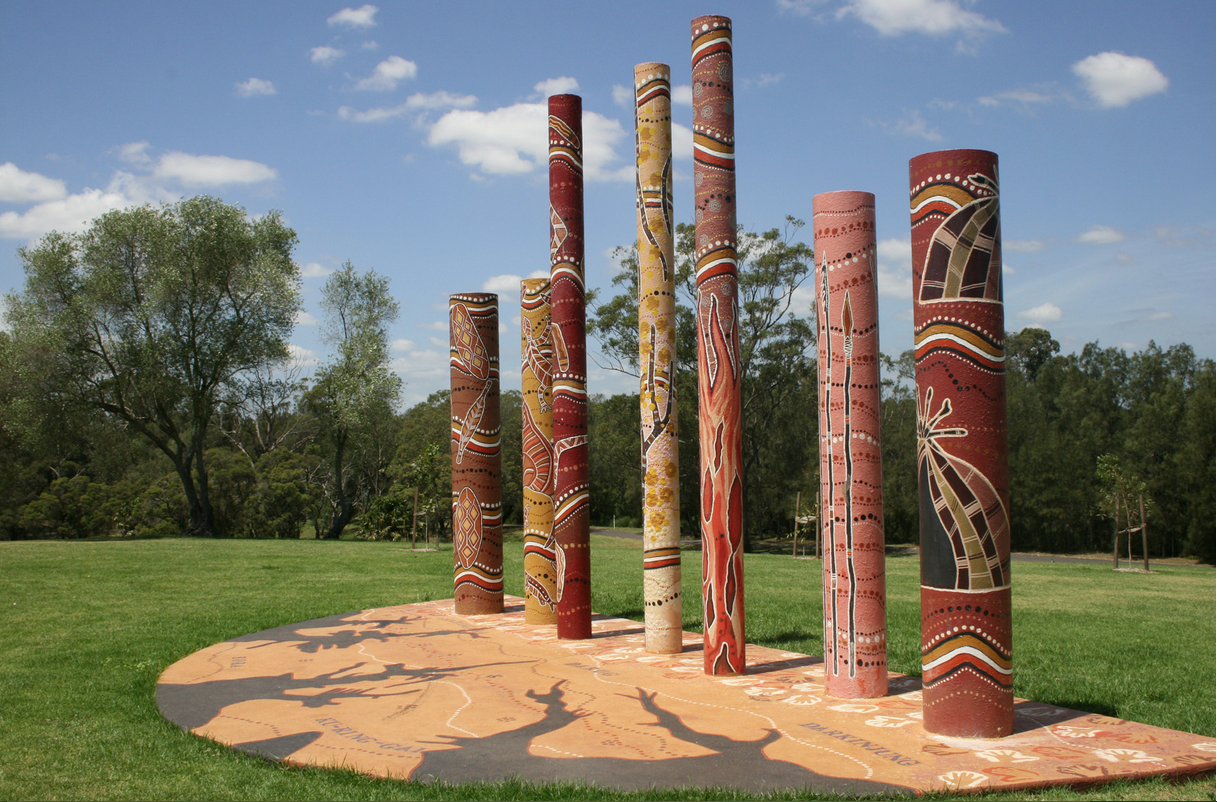
Seven Peace Keepers at Flinders Slopes

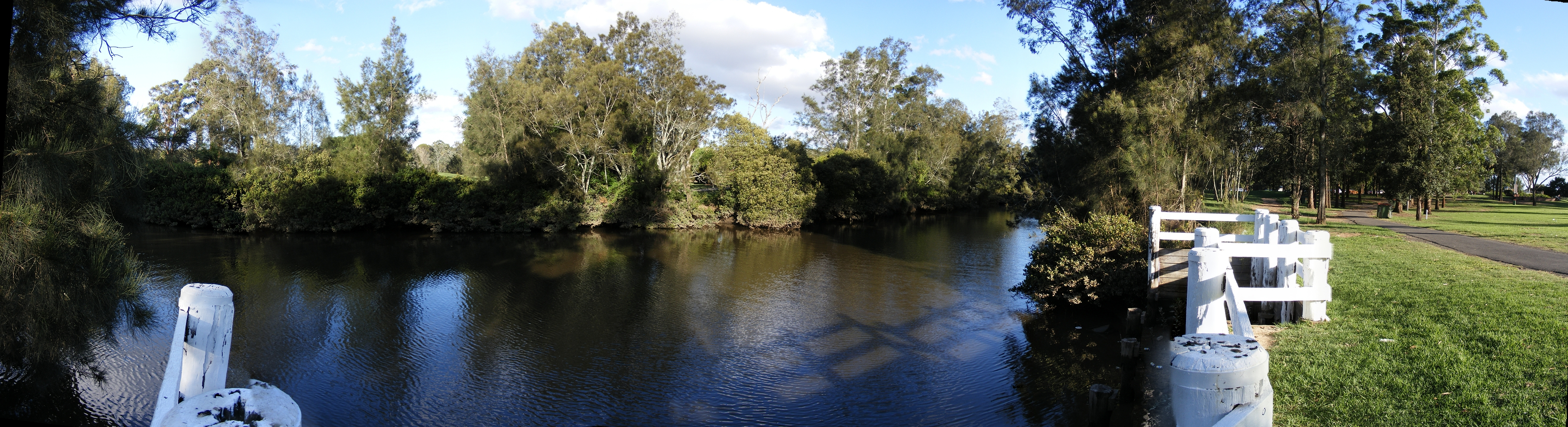
Lake Gillawarna

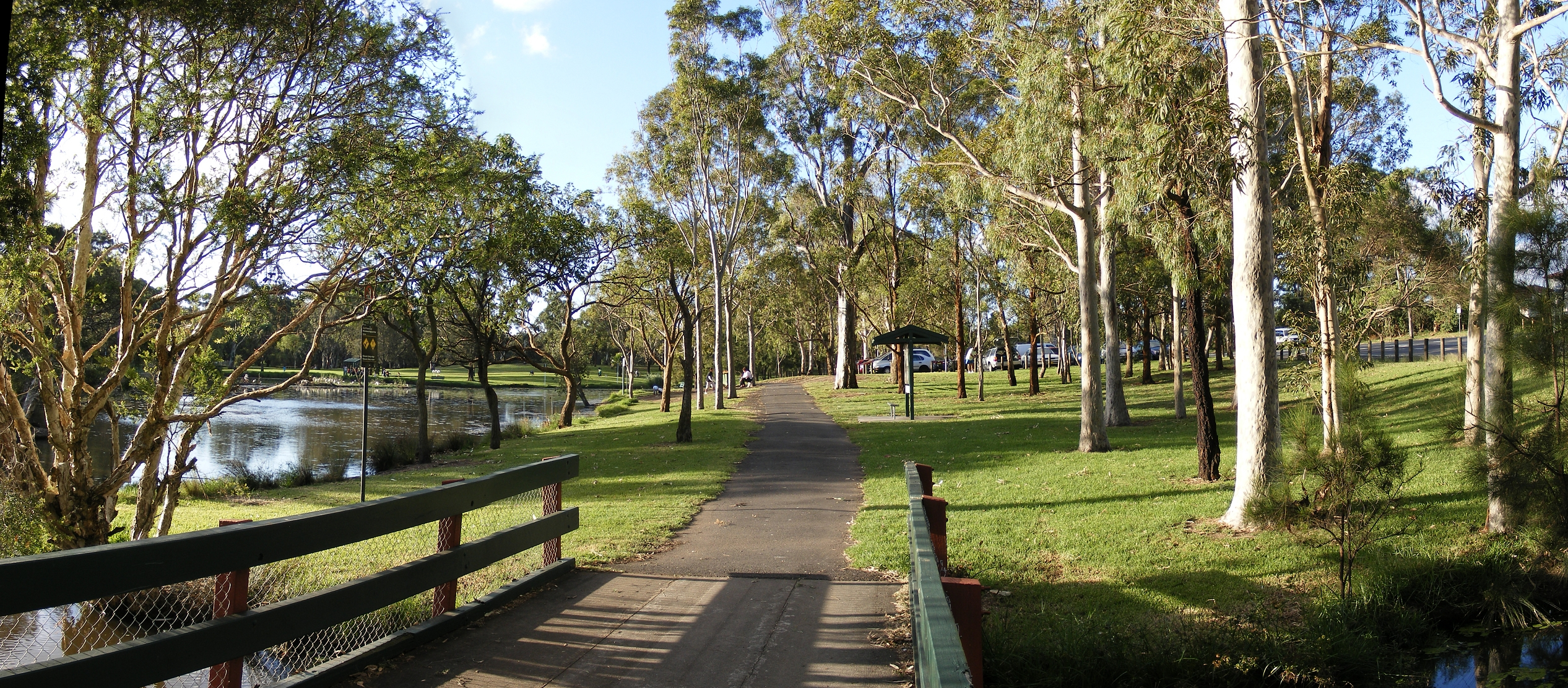
Parking area

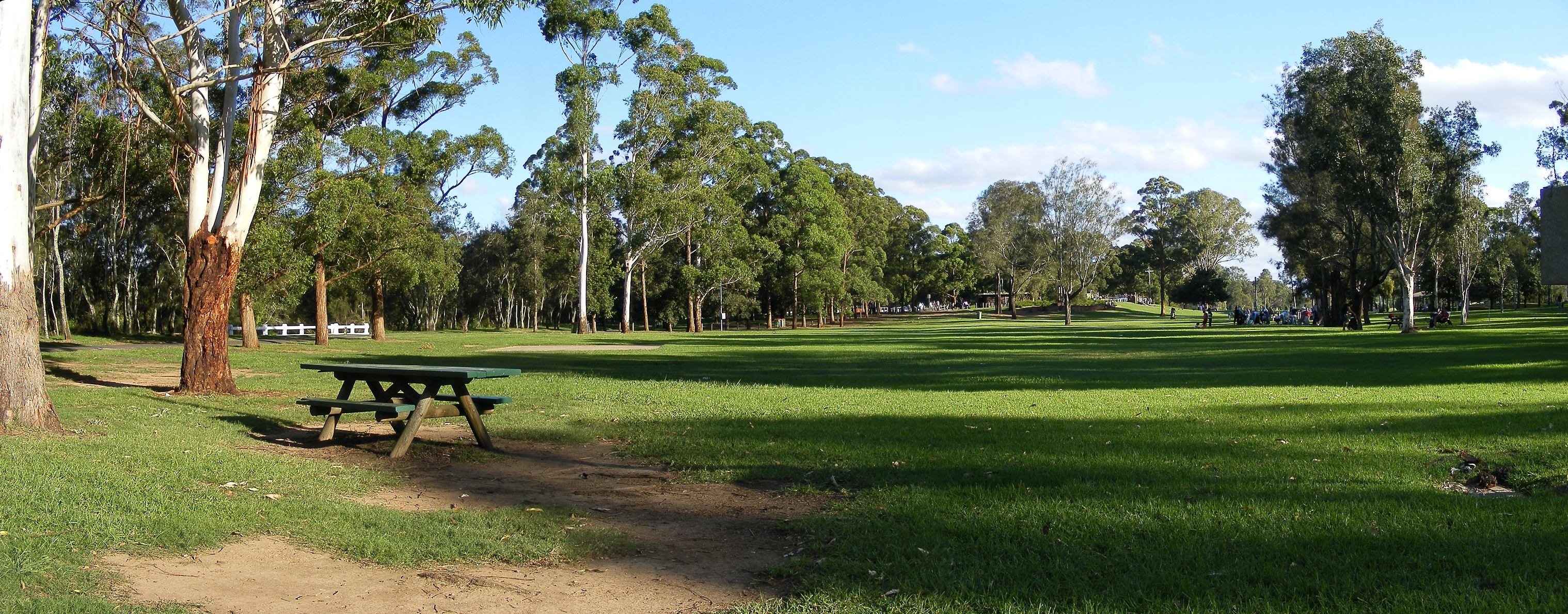
Garrison Point picnic area

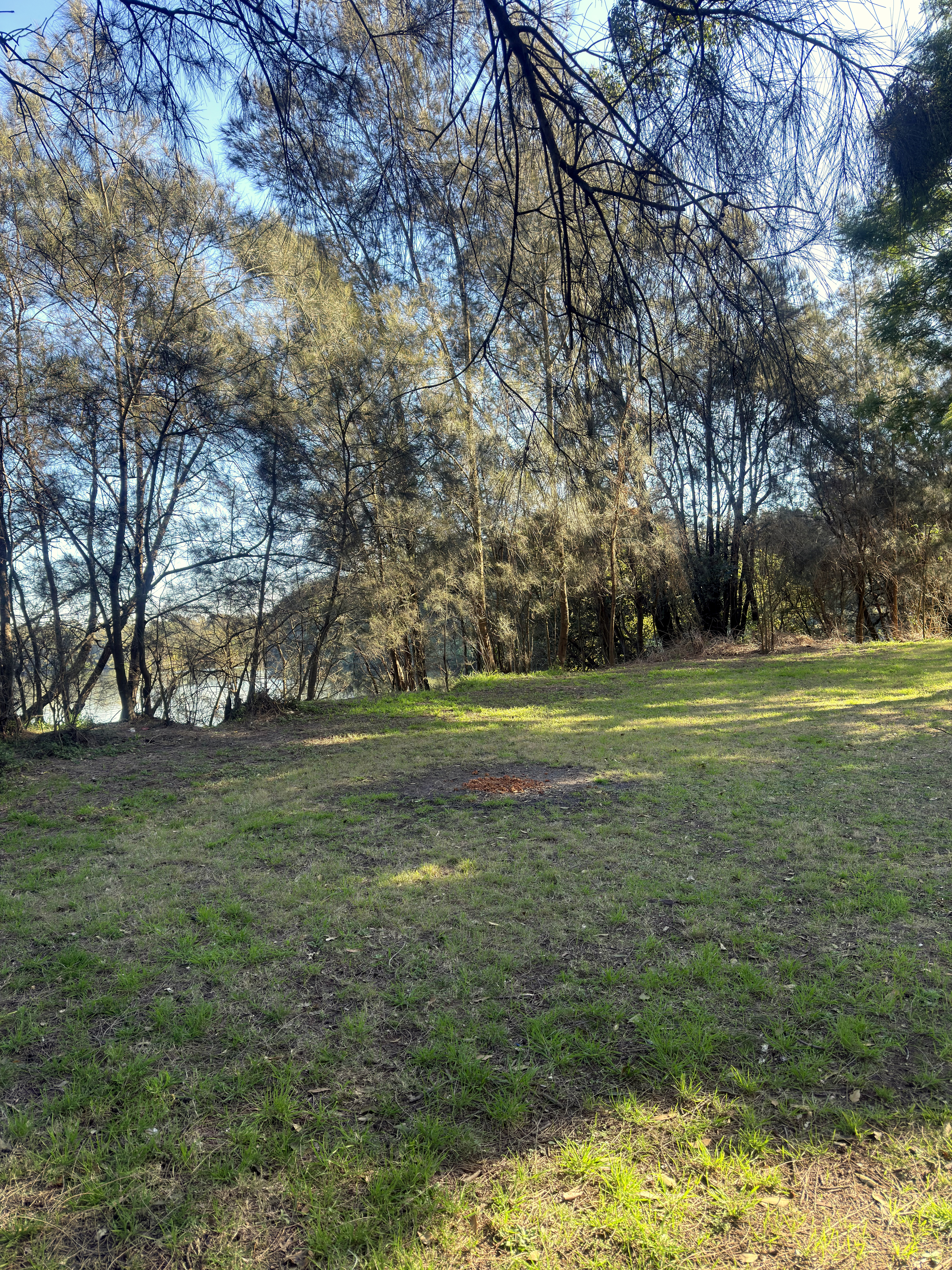
A wooded headland at Garrison Point, with the Georges River in the background
