= Georges River National Park =

National park in Sydney, Australia

Coordinates: 33°58′58″S 151°01′15″E

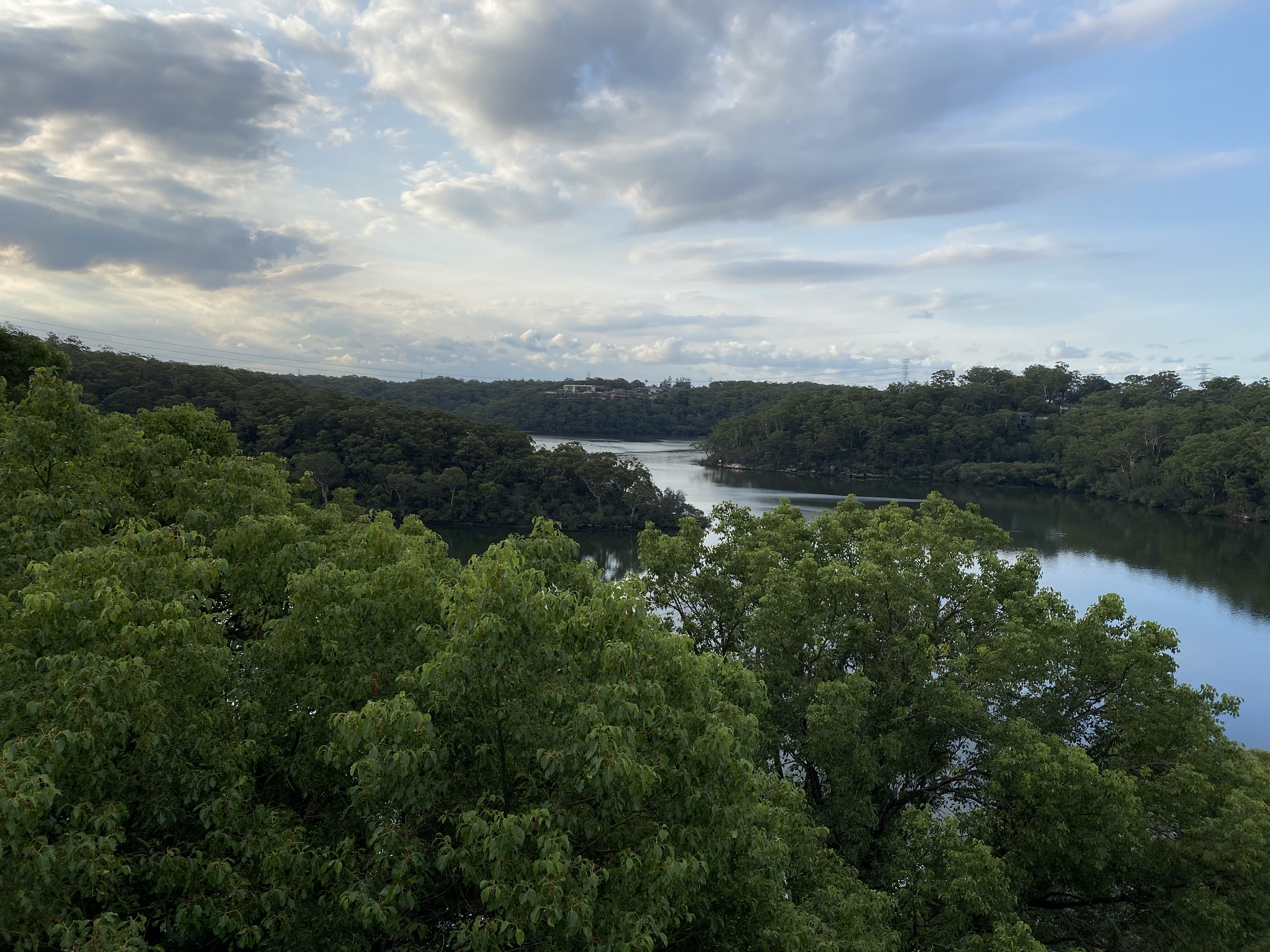
- Snapshot from Lugarno of the Georges River National Park
- Interactive map of Georges River National Park
- Location: Sydney, New South Wales, Australia
- Area: 514 hectares (1,270 acres)
- Established: April 1992
- Governing body: NSW National Parks and Wildlife Service

Georges River National Park is a protected Australian National Park, under the management of the NSW National Parks and Wildlife Service. The park falls in the regions of the Sutherland Shire Council and Canterbury-Bankstown Council. Located in the city of Sydney, 25 km south-west of the CBD, surrounded by neighbouring suburbs of Lugarno, Illawong, Alfords Point, Padstow Heights, Revesby Heights, Picnic Point and Sandy Point. The primary use of the park is to service for recreational activities such as; bush walking, picnics, barbeques, boating, fishing, and water/jet skiing. The park is segmented into 15 sectors along the riverbanks of the Georges River, encompassing 514 hectares (1,270 acres), housing many native aquatic and terrestrial Australian flora and fauna. The traditional custodians are the Dharug people located on the north side of the river, and Dharawal people located on the south of the river.

The park is legally protected under the National Parks and Wildlife Act 1974, with the aim to conserve nature through means of conservation, and ecology, encouraging people to visit the park in a safe, fun and sustainable way.

== Park highlights and attractions ==
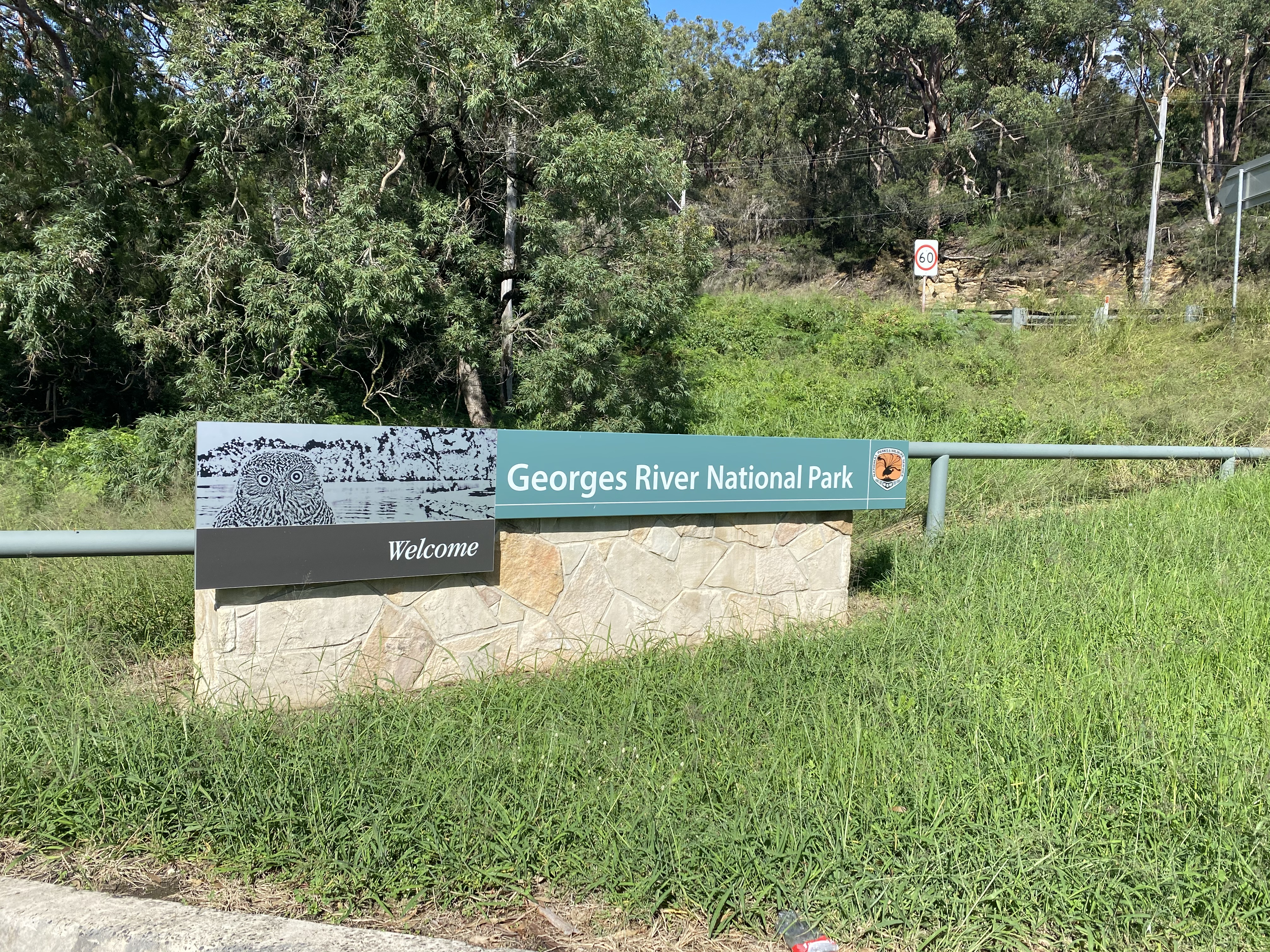
Entrance sign of the park, taken from Henry Lawson Drive

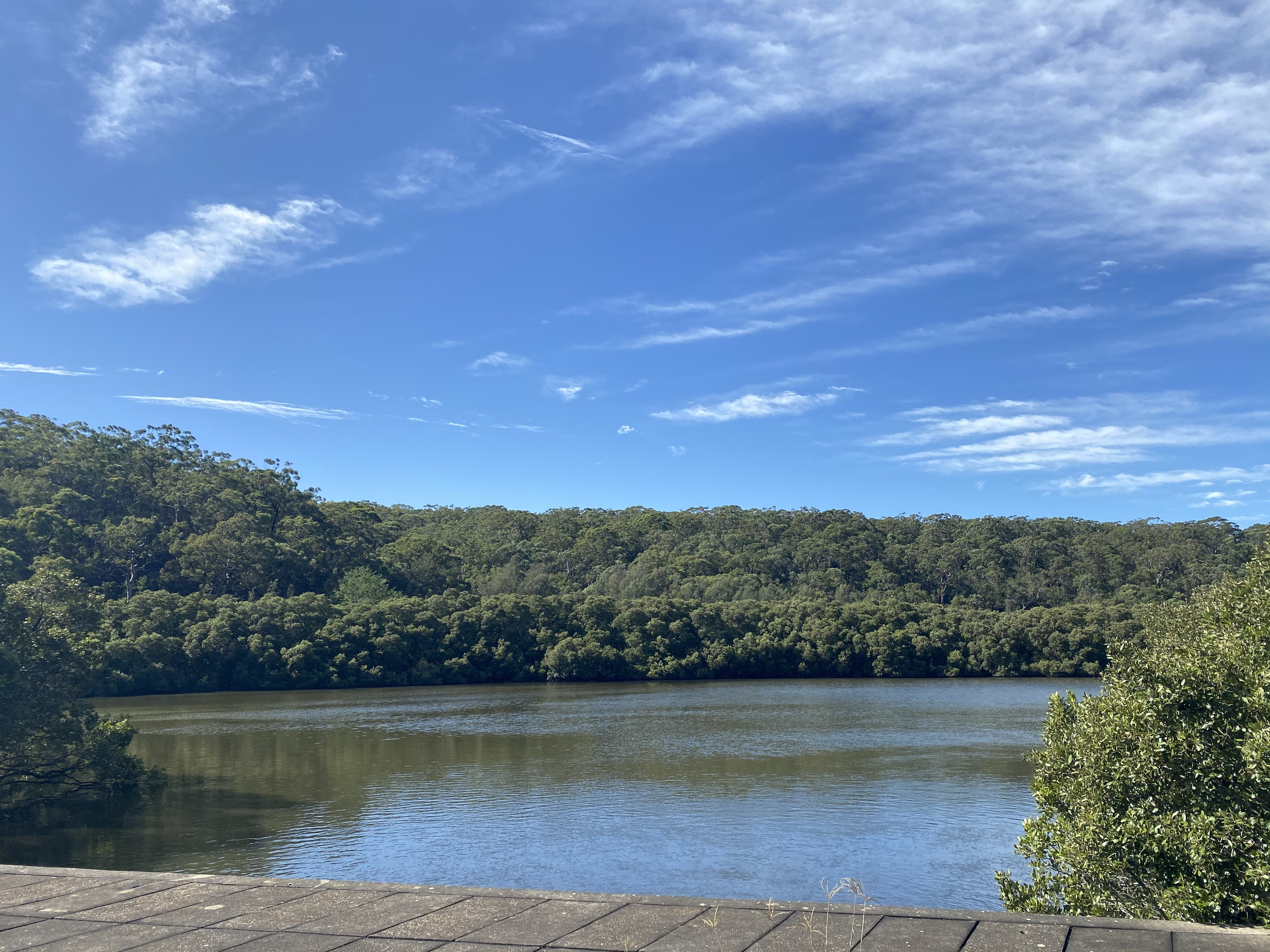
Photo taken from Little Salt Pan Creek bridge, Georges River National Park

The main entrance to the park is off Henry Lawson Drive at Revesby Heights, on to Burrawang Reach Rd.

- Revesby Beach – the beach located on the Georges River is the most common and frequently used swimming spot for visitors to the park. The water way is a common passing for bull sharks so swimming in the deep waters is cautioned to visitors.
- East Hills District Men's Shed Association – The Men's shed Association (AMSA) is a national organisation that supports local men, through activities of common interest; furniture making, motor repairs, bike restorations, and many other types of hands on activities. The East Hills District Men's Shed Association Inc, are located in the Georges River National Park and specialise in engineering, woodwork, stained glass making, and leather work, taking part in many volunteer community-based work, and maintenance.
- Ridge Walking Track – is a total distance of 3.2 kilometres (1.6 km in and out). It is estimated to take 30 minutes to an hour to complete the circuit.
- Yeramba Lagoon Loop Walking Track – it is a 1.8 kilometre trail. 100 species of birds have been recorded in the area, and up to 15 different bird species are present at one time, making this trail most popular for birdwatchers. Many bird species are found in this area of the park due to the abundance of freshwater wetlands and lakes found here. It takes roughly 30 minutes to 1 hour to complete the trail.
- Burrawang Reach Picnic Area – located adjacent to Little Salt Pan creek and Morgan's creek, this spot is most popular for recreational activities such as barbecuing and picnics. Situated not far off the shoreline are moorings for temporary boat parking near the shore.
- Morgan Creeks Picnic Area – most popular spot for water activities such as fishing, jet skiing and boating, as there is a dual width boat ramp for visitors to use. It is also the closest picnic area to the car park.

== Geography, Flora, Fauna ==
- Geography – The Georges River National Park lies upon a thick bed of Hawkesbury sandstone. In other sections of the park at Sandy Point, Mittagong sandstone is more common. Mittagong sandstone is younger much finer grained sandstone compared to Hawkesbury sandstone. The 96 km long saltwater Georges River runs through the centre of the park, named and honoured after King George the III. The parks highest point of elevation is at Mill Creek, 100 metres above sea level, with an average elevation of 60 metres. Additionally, the national park receives an average annual rainfall of 850-900 millimetres (mm), 435 mm less than Sydney's annual rainfall of 1309 mm.
- Flora – The river side predominantly consist of mangrove swamps, occupying 24 hectares on the national park, and salt marshes occupying 11 hectares of the national park. However, aerial photo analysis suggest between 1966 and 1998 unauthorised vehicles, BMX bikes, and motorised dirt bikes have reduced and declined these occupied areas of mangrove swamps and salt marches. The most common vegetation found throughout the park is Sydney Hinterland Exposed Sandstone Woodland, covering 293 hectares, characterised by eucalyptus trees 10–25 metres tall and small sclerophyll shrub. However, other floral habitats can be found in the national park as well, such as, Littoral Rainforests, Sydney Coastal Heaths, Coastal Freshwater Lagoons, and Coastal Floodplain Wetlands. Prioritised tree species that are under threat identified in the park are swamp mahogany and red gum. These are flowering tree species which nurture and feed animals species such as the grey-headed flying fox and little lorikeets. They are under-threat due to high public disturbance, and are not widely dispersed within the park. Moreover, there has been a reduction in the numbers of hollow-bearing trees with in the park, which shelter and allow for the breeding of Sittella bird species.
- Fauna – Roughly 248 native vertebrate species have been recorded in the Georges River National Park compromising of animals ranging from amphibians, reptiles, birds, and mammals, both introduced and native. Out of the 248 species found in the park 20 of those species are threatened under the Threatened Species Conservation Act, 1995 and 8 species listed under the Environment Protection and Biodiversity Conservation Act, 1999, including animals such as the Green and Golden Bell frog and the blue billed duck. In total sixteen frog species have been recorded in the national park, the most common being the eastern dwarf tree frog and Tylers tree frog. Thirty two locally endemic reptile species can be found in the park, one freshwater turtle species, twenty two types of lizards (four geckoes, thirteen skinks, three dragons, two goannas), and nine snakes. The most abundant reptile species is the dark-flecked garden sunskink. Moreover, 180 species of native bird can be observed, 59 being waterbird species. Finally, twenty species of mammals are locally native to the park, the most frequently occurring being the common ringtail and brushtail possums, the swamp wallaby and the grey-headed flying-fox. A breeding population of Koalas live in the park, however are listed at as threatened. It is further noted that 59% of mammals are nocturnal microbats, such as the little forest bat, and the chocolate wattled bat. Eighteen invasive species threaten the parks native fauna, with the common fox being the most wide spread and devastating, impacting the long-nosed bandicoot population as well as the swamp wallaby.

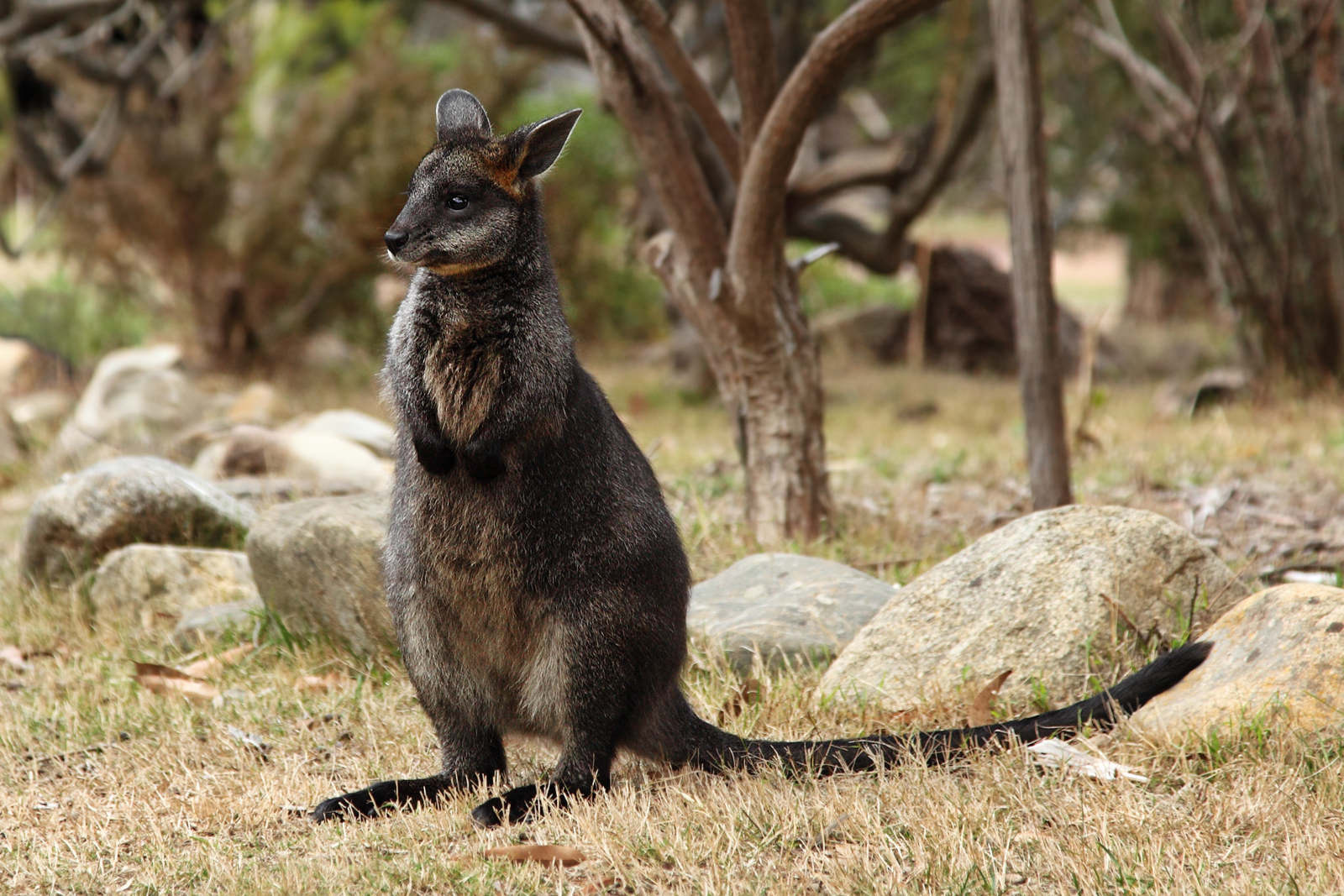
Swamp Wallaby

== Management Strategies ==
- Park management – The NSW National Parks and Wildlife Act, 1974 evokes that all 870 National Parks and reserves located in NSW, should have a plan of management to sustain the natural ecology of the parks for future generations. Georges River National Park plan of management, 1994, objectively aims too; protect and preserve the natural beauty of the park, whilst conserving wildlife, and historical Aboriginal sites. Encouraging appropriate recreational activities and aiding in visitor education. Actions taken to adhere to these goals are; erosion and weed control on areas surrounding Henry Lawson drive, rehabilitation of disturbed areas, increased research and surveys of the area, accounting for introduced flora and fauna species and their eventual eradication, with the re-introduction of endemic species. Furthermore, swimming in the national park was a popular past time activity, but due to shark attacks swimmers were confined to netted areas, and with the increase in pollution in 1960 all swimming in the national park was prohibited. The plan of management does not permit for the re-opening of netted swimming areas out of fears the water is still far too polluted, 90% due to stormwater run off. The Georges River Keeper program are seeking to clean the river system, collecting on average 100 tonnes of litter, compromising of 68,000 plastic bottles, annually. Since the establishment of the Georges River Keeper program, they have witnessed a significant decrease in river pollution from 2015 to 2017, evident in their annual report. The NSW National Parks Wildlife Service seek to re-open netted swimming areas, however far more rehabilitation needs to be conducted.
- Fire management – The National Parks and Wildlife Act, 1974 also states that all National Parks in NSW should have a plan of management for natural disasters such as Bushfires. In 1985 80% of the Georges River National Park burnt due to a wild fire, therefore establishing the park as a threatened fire area. Since then strict park fire management strategies have been emplaced, most recently the, Georges River Park Fire Management Strategy, 2018. This document is a legal requirement, that outlines operational guidelines for prescribed burning and wildfires. The fire management plan list operations to combat wildfires, such as; Aerial water bombing, Aerial Ignition, Back burning, Containment Lines, Fire Suppression Chemicals, Earth moving equipment, Visitor Management in case of fire, and Rehabilitation methods for burnt areas. The plan additionally maps out the current vegetation status of the whole National Park bush lands. Listing the areas as other vulnerable, frequently burnt, long unburnt or unknown. The management strategy also names and highlights threatened Fauna, which fire services should be aware, for example the Hieraaetus morphnoides (little eagle), and Ninox strenua (powerful owl), as well as their habitats (hollow bearing trees).

== Park History ==
- Modern History — Following WW2, the Georges River area and Bankstown City industrial industries accounted for 20% of all the factories located in Sydney. With the increase of industrialisation, pollution became a problem, as of 1971 the Georges river became the second most toxic body of water in all of Sydney. The continual increase in industrial pollution encouraged locals to take action, advocating for the protection and conservation of threatened ecological niches along the river. As a result, between 1961 and 1967 the Georges River National Park was established, and a trust group was founded, to manage and protect the park lands. During this period most of the funding for the park came from sand mine leases. However, after the introduction of the 1967 National Parks and Wildlife Service, the Georges River National Park was downgraded and listed as a state park, also known as a 'nature reserve'. Reasons for this was that the park did not meet certain qualities of having spacious land areas. Finally, in 1992 the park was re-declared a National Park and increased in size from 173 hectares in 1961, to 514 in 2020.
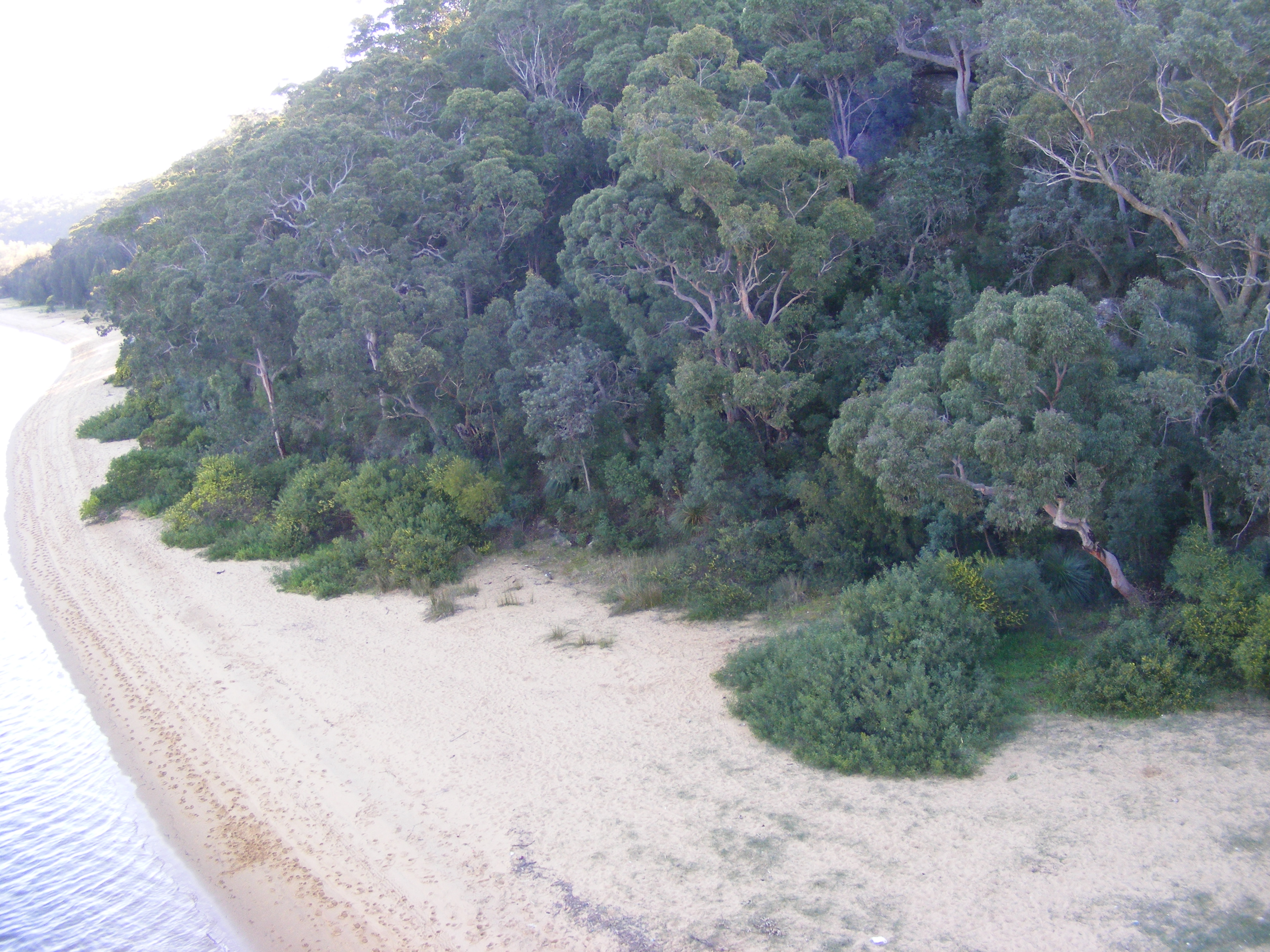
  Looking down from Alfords Point Bridge
- Indigenous History – The Georges River is known to the Indigenous people as the Tucoerah River, evidence of past indigenous activity is present in the national park, including aboriginal shelters, rock engravings, and axe grinding sites. Upon European settlement of Sydney, the Dharug and Dharawal people of the Georges River were forced up stream by colonist to the now located Georges River National Park. However, fast industrial growth in this area between 1900 and 1930, lead to many native families being forcefully evicted off their land. It wasn't until 1930 where an indigenous activist, Joe Anderson, appealed for Salt Pan Creek to become a place of refuge for indigenous people. Salt Pan Creek located near Padstow in the Georges River National Park, became a place of shelter for many indigenous political fighters, such as Jack Patten, Bert Grovers, Ted Thomas, Bill Onus, and Jacko Campbel. Additionally, Salt Pan Creek was the site for many aboriginal families to seek refuge from the Australian Government between 1910 and 1970, during the stolen generations. The park and water ways allowed aboriginal people to hunt and gather food, practice indigenous associated rituals, and stay connected to the dreaming thus the land.
