= Georges Hall =

- Suburb
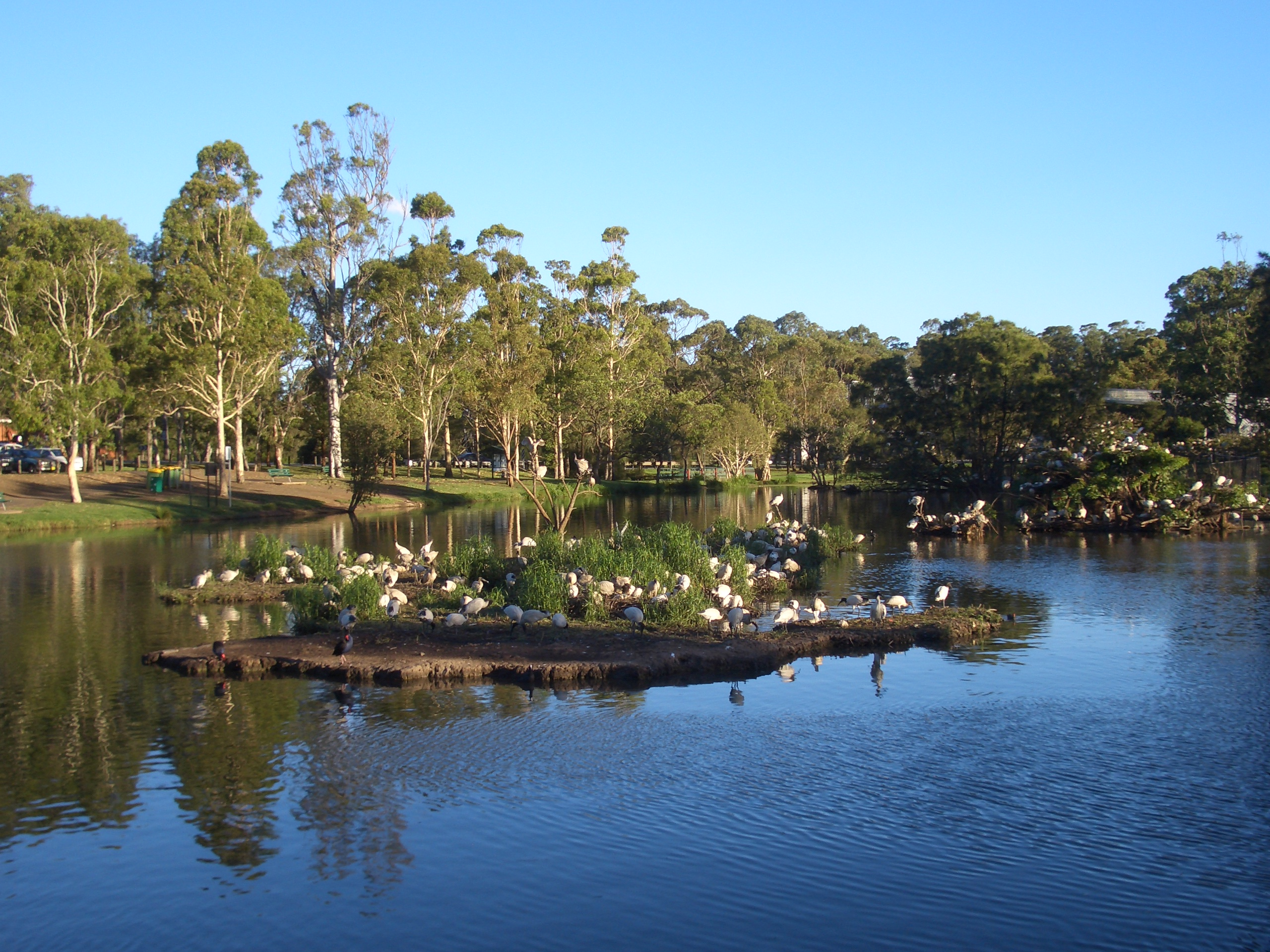
- Lake Gillawarna

- Interactive map of Georges Hall
- Coordinates: 33°54′44″S 150°59′08″E
- Country: Australia
- State: New South Wales
- City: Sydney
- LGA: City of Canterbury-Bankstown
- Location: 24 km (15 mi) south-west of Sydney CBD
- Established: 1924

Government
  - State electorates: Bankstown; East Hills
  - Federal division: Watson

Area
  - Total: 3.4 km^{2} (1.3 sq mi)
- Elevation: 17 m (56 ft)

Population
  - Total: 9,739 (2021 census)
  - Density: 2,860/km^{2} (7,420/sq mi)
- Postcode: 2198
Suburbs around Georges Hall
Lansvale	Lansdowne	Bass Hill
Lansvale	Georges Hall	Yagoona
Chipping Norton	Bankstown Aerodrome	Condell Park

Georges Hall is a suburb in South-western Sydney in the state of New South Wales, Australia. It is part of the local government area of City of Canterbury-Bankstown, and is located 24 kilometres south-west of the Sydney central business district.

Georges Hall is bounded by the Georges River in the west and Bankstown Aerodrome in the south. The suburbs of Bass Hill and Condell Park lie to the north and east, respectively.

== History ==
This suburb was originally part of Bankstown and Bankstown Airport (its nearest neighbour).

In 1795, George Bass, Matthew Flinders and the boy servant William Martin began an expedition to explore parts of the colony on a small boat called the Tom Thumb. They sailed into Botany Bay and explored the Georges River, twenty miles (32 km) beyond previous expeditions to the area that is now Garrison Point.

For their exploration efforts Bass was given a 100-acre (0.40 km^{2}) grant by Governor John Hunter (in the area of present-day Hazel Street and Flinders Road, alongside Prospect Creek) in 1798, neighbouring suburb Bass Hill honours his name. This grant later reverted to the Crown. Bass's fellow explorer, Matthew Flinders, received a grant south of Bass's (bounded by present-day Marion St, Bellevue Ave, Flinders Rd and Prospect Creek). He bought more land until he had 300-acre (1.2 km^{2}), but he did not farm it.

Lieutenant-Colonel George Johnston built his first home, a farmhouse, in this area, on a grant of 172-acre (0.70 km^{2}) in 1798. It was situated on Prospect Creek, near the present day Henry Lawson Drive and Beatty Parade. He called it 'Georges Hall'. His third son, David became a grazier on this property (which was a farming area in its early days), and the suburb takes its name from the Johnston farm.

David Johnston was later appointed by Governor Lachlan Macquarie as superintendent of herds and stock for the colony. His older brother, George Jr. had held this position until his death in 1820 following a riding accident on the Macarthur property at Camden Park. In 1809 the farmhouse of George's Hall was used as an administration centre, where it was used to conduct the census. Garrison Point obtained its name from the garrison of soldiers that were stationed here to ensure the safety of Lt Colonel Johnston as he conducted a census in the area. The park is now the local focus of annual Australia Day celebrations in the Bankstown area.

In 1837 another home was built by the Johnston family, this time it was on higher ground in Bankstown (in present Lionel Street), and well away from the danger of Georges River floods. The Homestead, as they called it, is one of the oldest houses in the local area, its design was simple but elegant, with wide verandahs, and the interior of the house featured cedar woodwork. The Johnston family has been commemorated by Johnston Road.

Street names in Georges Hall commemorate two First World War Soldiers - Lord Birdwood is immortalised by Birdwood Avenue, and another great soldier - Haig, by Haig Avenue.

== Heritage listings ==
Georges Hall has a number of heritage-listed sites, including:

- 1a Lionel Street: The Homestead

== Parks and reserves ==
Garrison Point is located near the junction of Georges River and Prospect Creek. Adjacent to Garrison Point is Lake Gillawarna, an artificial lake that forms an important breeding ground for native birds.

Garrison Point and Lake Gillawarna form the southern part of a larger reserve called Mirambeena Regional Park that extends into the adjacent suburb of Lansvale. A short distance south from Garrison Point is Kentucky Reserve, another recreational park area overlooking the Georges River, adjacent to Henry Lawson Drive.

== Population ==
After WW2 Georges Hall expanded significantly with a large number of Eastern European refugees building homes in the area after migrating to Australia in the late 1940s and 1950s.

According to the 2021 census, there were 9,739 residents in Georges Hall. The majority of residents (62.2%) were born in Australia. Of those born outside of Australia, the top countries of birth were Lebanon 6.9%, Vietnam 5.0%, Greece 1.5%, Syria 1.4% and Italy 1.4%. 43.4% of people spoke only English at home. Other languages spoken at home included Arabic 23.5%, Vietnamese 7.3%, Greek 3.9%, Italian 1.9% and Macedonian 1.7%. The most common responses for religion in Georges Hall were Catholic 26.7%, Islam 24.7%, Not stated 10.1%, Eastern Orthodox 10.1% and No Religion 10.1%. Home ownership was popular, with 39.4% of people owning their home outright and 38.2% were paying off their home with a mortgage.

== Schools ==
- Calvary Chapel Christian School
- Georges Hall Public School
- St. Mary's, Queen of Heaven Primary School
- Georges River Grammar (note that it is not technically in the suburb, but their mailing address is in Georges Hall - the school is actually in Bankstown Aerodrome)

== Landmarks ==
- Bankstown Airport – a metropolitan airport
- Dunc Gray Velodrome
- The Reservoir
- Mirambeena Reserve
- Lake Gillawarna - including an island full of Ibis
- The Homestead, Lionel Street. This large, single-storey house was built by David Johnston in 1837. It is now listed on the Register of the National Estate.
