= Henry Lawson Drive =

Road in Sydney, Australia

Henry Lawson Drive New South Wales
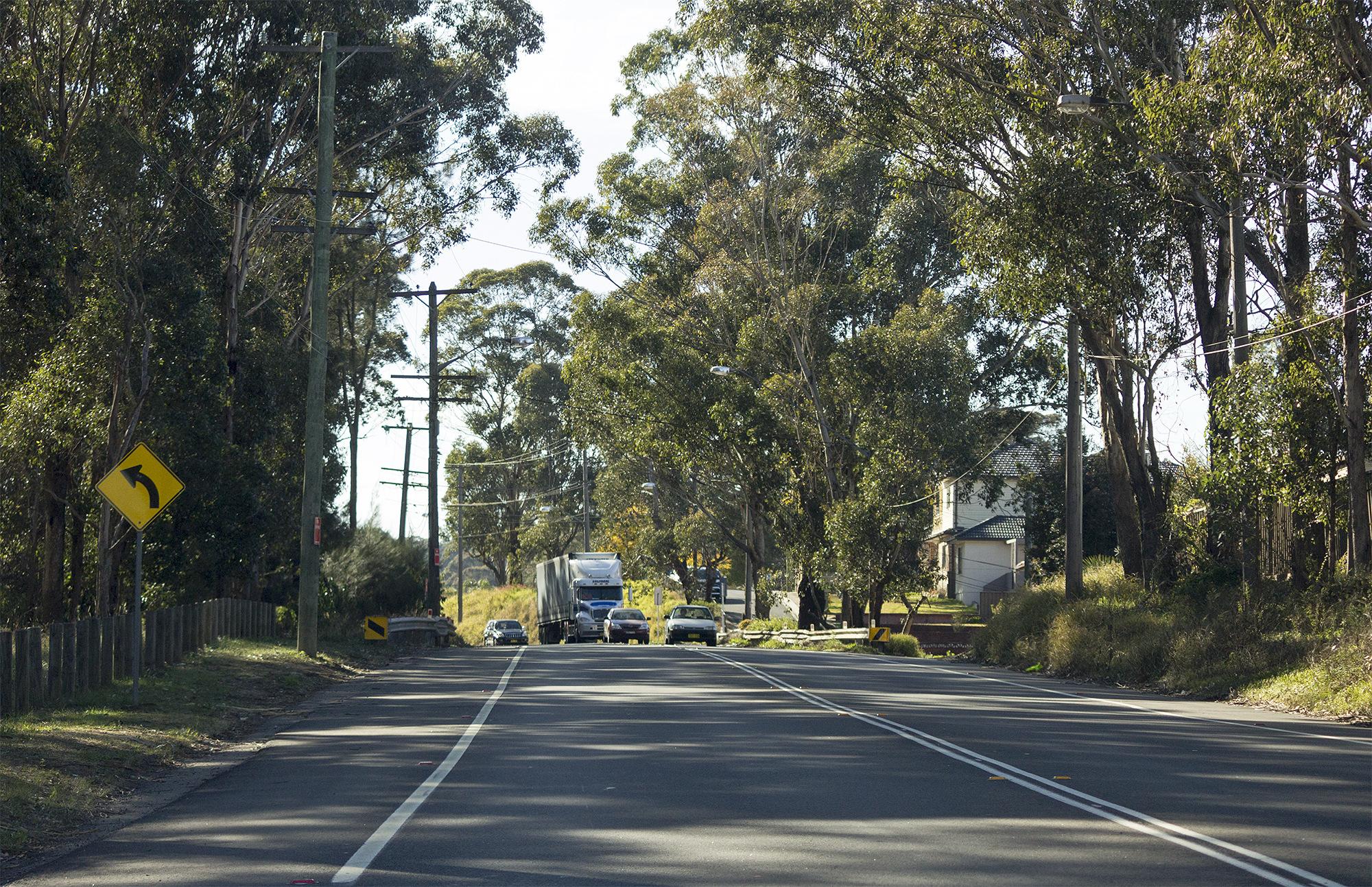
- Henry Lawson Drive at Georges Hall
- Location in metropolitan Sydney
- Coordinates: 33.889577°S 150.973117°E (Northwest end); 33.961329°S 151.058038°E (Southeast end)

General information
- Type: Road
- Length: 19.9 km (12 mi)
- Gazetted: October 1939
- Former route number: State Route 55 (1974–2004); Ring Road 5 (1964–1974)

Major junctions
- Northwest end: Woodville Road; Lansdowne, Sydney
- Hume Highway; Milperra Road; South West Motorway; Alfords Point Road
- Southeast end: Forest Road; Peakhurst, Sydney

Location(s)
- Major suburbs: Georges Hall, Milperra, East Hills, Padstow Heights

Henry Lawson Drive is an 20-kilometre (12 mi) urban road linking Lansdowne and Peakhurst in the south-western suburbs of Sydney, New South Wales, Australia. The road is named in honour of Henry Lawson (1867–1922), one of Australia's foremost poets.

== Route ==
Henry Lawson Drive commences at the intersection with Hume Highway and Woodville Road - also known as the Meccano Set due to its series of overhead gantries - at Lansdowne, and heads in a southerly direction as a two-lane single carriageway road, running alongside the bank of Prospect Creek and then Georges River for the most part, past Bankstown Airport and through Milperra to meet South-West Motorway. The road eventually turns in an easterly direction, still mostly following the river course, through Georges River National Park to meet Alfords Point Road at Padstow Heights where it widens to a six-lane, dual-carriageway road, until it eventually terminates at the intersection with Forest Road in Peakhurst.

The maximum elevation of the road is 60.9 metres (200 ft) AMSL and at its lowest point it is 1.65 metres (5 ft 5 in) AMSL.

== History ==
The passing of the Main Roads Act of 1924 through the Parliament of New South Wales provided for the declaration of Main Roads, roads partially funded by the State government through the Main Roads Board (MRB). With the subsequent passing of the Main Roads (Amendment) Act of 1929 to provide for additional declarations of State Highways and Trunk Roads, the Department of Main Roads (having succeeded the MRB in 1932) declared Main Road 508 from Lansdowne via Milperra, East Hills Picnic Point and Salt Pan Creek to Peakhurst on 18 October 1939.

The full length of the route was officially named Henry Lawson Drive on 16 June 1948.

The passing of the Roads Act of 1993 updated road classifications and the way they could be declared within New South Wales. Under this act, Henry Lawson Drive retains its declaration as Main Road 508.

Henry Lawson Drive was allocated part of Ring Road 3 in 1964. It was replaced by State Route 55 in 1974, and eventually decommissioned in 2004, and is currently unallocated.

Henry Lawson Drive was conceived of as a scenic drive to follow the north bank of Georges River, and was known in its planning stages as the George's River feeder road. Most of the route (from Hume Highway to The River Road) was built in the period 1946–55, with some sections in Georges Hall, Milperra, East Hills, Picnic Point and Peakhurst utilising pre-existing but unsealed roads. In 1963, following the closure of the Morgans Creek landfill waste disposal site at the southern end of The River Road, Henry Lawson Drive was extended to Padstow Heights with the completion of the 53-metre-long (174 ft) bridge over Little Salt Pan Creek. In September 1964 the final section was completed with the opening of the 183-metre-long (600 ft) bridge over Salt Pan Creek, connecting the road via what had formerly been Hymen Street to Forest Road in Peakhurst. In 1975 the T-intersection with Forest Road at the eastern terminus was reconfigured so that the route from Henry Lawson Drive to Forest Road northbound became the through route. Widening of the section from Alfords Point Road to Forest Road occurred incrementally, initially by reconfiguring pavement markings and construction of a westbound overtaking lane. It was later widened to four lanes in places and then six lanes. This work was completed in conjunction with the widening from two to six lanes of the Salt Pan Creek Bridge.

=== Upgrades ===
Since the opening of South-West Motorway in 1992, the section of Henry Lawson Drive between the motorway and Milperra Road has had high congestion levels and the City of Canterbury-Bankstown has been trying to overcome this.

The first section through Georges Hall was completed in May 2023, adding an extra southbound lane and a new pedestrian footpath. The second section, from Tower Road (the Bankstown Airport access road) to Auld Avenue in Milperra, previously widened to four lanes with turning bays, is still ongoing. Subsequent stages are intended to see duplication to dual two-lane carriageways from Hume Highway to South-West Motorway.

== Gallery ==
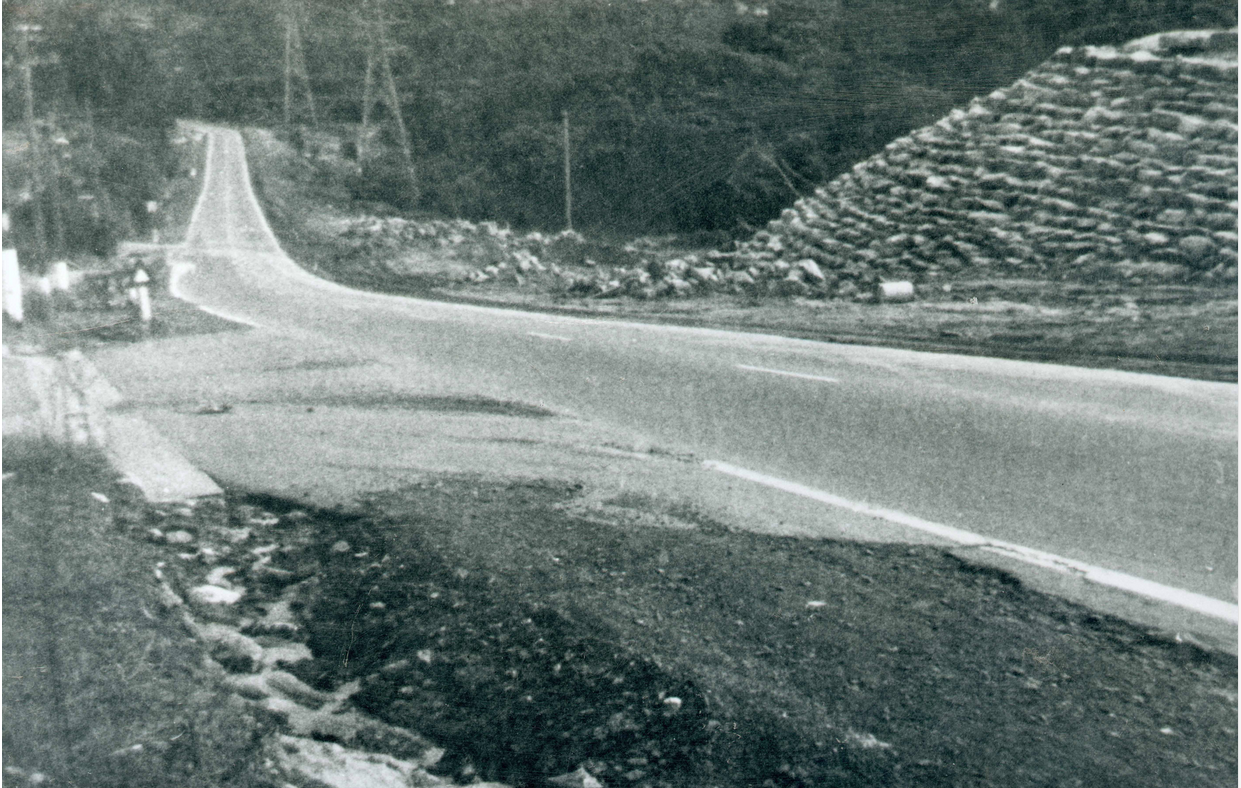
Henry Lawson Drive before construction of Alfords Point Bridge in 1972

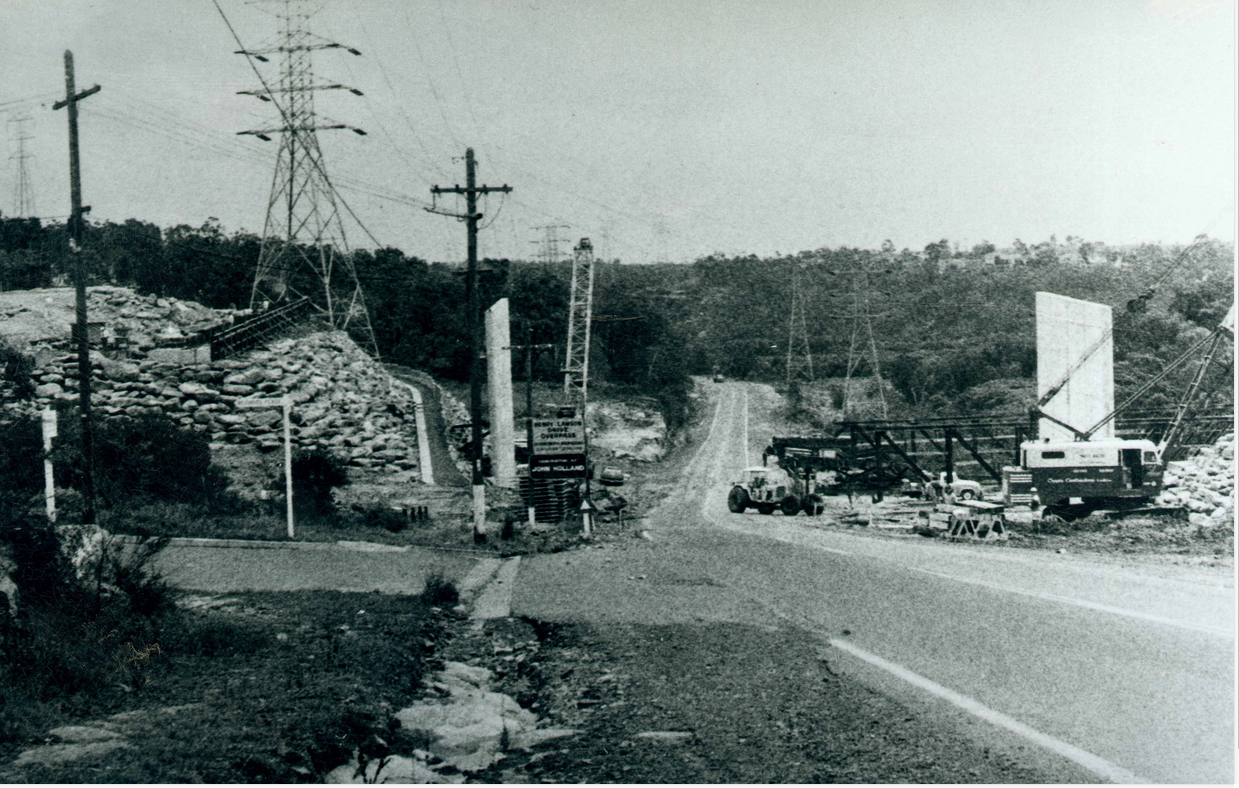
Construction of Henry Lawson Drive overpass for Alfords Point Bridge in 1973

== Major intersections ==
LGA	Location	km	mi	Destinations	Notes
Canterbury-Bankstown	Villawood–Lansdowne boundary	0.0	0.0	Woodville Road (north) – Woodville, Parramatta	Northwestern terminus of road
Canterbury-Bankstown	Villawood–Lansdowne boundary	0.0	0.0	Hume Highway (A22) – Liverpool, Bankstown, Ashfield	Meccano Set intersection
Canterbury-Bankstown	Bankstown Aerodrome	5.1	3.2	Tower Road – Bankstown Airport	
Canterbury-Bankstown	Bankstown Aerodrome–Milperra boundary	5.4	3.4	Newbridge Road (A34 west) – Liverpool, Moore Park; Milperra Road (A34 east) – Punchbowl, Canterbury	
Canterbury-Bankstown	Milperra–Panania boundary	7.5	4.7	South-West Motorway (M5) – Liverpool, Campbelltown	
Canterbury-Bankstown	Picnic Point	12.2	7.6	Picnic Point Road – Panania	Roundabout
Canterbury-Bankstown	Picnic Point–Revesby Heights boundary	15.7	9.8	The River Road – Revesby	
Canterbury-Bankstown	Padstow Heights	17.2	10.7	Alfords Point Road (A6) – Alfords Point, Bangor, Lucas Heights	Southbound entrance only
Georges River	Peakhurst	19.9	12.4	Jacques Avenue (north) – Riverwood	
Georges River	Peakhurst	19.9	12.4	Forest Road – Lugarno, Hurstville, Arncliffe	Southwestern terminus of road
Incomplete access; Tolled; Route transition
