= Khal Asfour =

Australian politician

Councillor Khal Asfour

1st Mayor of Canterbury-Bankstown
- In office 26 September 2017 – 11 May 2023
- Deputy: See list: Nadia Saleh Clare Raffan Bilal El-Hayek Rachelle Harika Linda Downey Bilal El-Hayek Clare Raffan
- Preceded by: Richard Colley (Administrator)
- Succeeded by: Bilal El-Hayek

Councillor of the City of Canterbury-Bankstown for Bankstown Ward
- Incumbent
- Assumed office 9 September 2017

52nd Mayor of Bankstown
- In office 27 June 2011 – 16 September 2014
- Deputy: Allan Winterbottom; Scott Parker
- Preceded by: Tania Mihailuk
- Succeeded by: Linda Downey
- In office 21 September 2015 – 12 May 2016
- Deputy: Dan Nguyen
- Preceded by: Linda Downey
- Succeeded by: Council abolished

Personal details
- Party: Labor
- Education: University of New South Wales

Khaldoun Asfour is an Australian politician and former Mayor of the City of Canterbury-Bankstown, the largest local government area in New South Wales by population, and fourth most-populous local government in Australia. He previously served as a councillor for the City of Bankstown from 2004 to 2016, serving as its mayor from 2011 to 2014 and again from 2015 to 2016.

== Career ==
Asfour is a member of the Australian Labor Party, and publicly announced his intention to nominate as the party's endorsed candidate for the New South Wales state seat of Lakemba for the 2015 New South Wales state election. He was not successful, with the party choosing eventual MP Jihad Dib without a local pre-selection contest taking place.

In 2018, Asfour announced that the City of Canterbury-Bankstown would establish a pilot program to provide free childcare to all local asylum seeker families in its council-run centres, the first program of its kind in Australia.

In 2022, Asfour was accused of being an acolyte for corrupt politician Eddie Obeid by fellow Labor MP Tania Mihailuk in state Parliament. Following the claims, Asfour was investigated by an independent party and was subsequently cleared of any wrongdoing in January 2023.

Asfour was a candidate for the 2023 New South Wales state election for the Legislative Council but he withdrew due to allegations of impropriety through excessive expenses.

Asfour was also a candidate for the 2024 Canterbury Bankstown Council election. He was subsequently re-elected to the council.

Civic offices
Preceded by Richard McLaughlin	Deputy Mayor of Bankstown; 2008 – 2011	Succeeded by Allan Winterbottom
Preceded by Tania Mihailuk	Mayor of Bankstown; 2011 – 2014	Succeeded by Linda Downey
Preceded by Linda Downey	Mayor of Bankstown; 2015 – 2016	Council abolished
Preceded by Richard Colley as Administrator	Mayor of Canterbury-Bankstown; 2017 – 2023	Succeeded by Bilal El-Hayek
