= City of Bankstown =

Former local government area in New South Wales, Australia

- Local government area
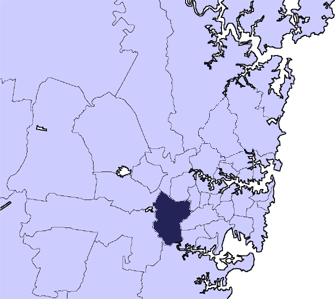
- Location in Metropolitan Sydney

- Coordinates: 33°55′S 151°02′E
- Country: Australia
- State: New South Wales
- Region: Inner West
- Established: 7 September 1895
- Abolished: 12 May 2016
- Council seat: Bankstown

Government
  - Mayor: Khal Asfour

Area
  - Total: 76.8 km^{2} (29.7 sq mi)

Population
  - Total: 193,398 (2011 census) (15th)
  - Density: 2,374/km^{2} (6,150/sq mi)
- Time zone: UTC+10 (AEST)
  - Summer (DST): UTC+11 (AEDT)
- Website: City of Bankstown
LGAs around City of Bankstown
	Strathfield
City of Bankstown	Canterbury
Sutherland	Hurstville

The City of Bankstown was a local government area in the south-west region of Sydney, Australia, centred on the suburb of Bankstown, from 1895 to 2016. The last mayor of the City of Bankstown Council was Clr Khal Asfour, a member of the Labor Party.

A 2015 review of local government boundaries by the NSW Government Independent Pricing and Regulatory Tribunal recommended that the City of Bankstown merge with the City of Canterbury to form a new council with an area of 110 square kilometres (42 sq mi) and support a population of approximately 351,000. On 12 May 2016, the NSW Government announced that Bankstown would merge with the City of Canterbury to be known as the City of Canterbury-Bankstown.

== Suburbs of the City of Bankstown ==
Suburbs and localities in the former local government area were:

- Bankstown
- Bankstown Aerodrome
- Bass Hill
- Birrong
- Chester Hill
- Chullora
- Condell Park
- East Hills
- Georges Hall
- Greenacre
- Lansdowne
- Leightonfield
- Manahan
- Milperra
- Mount Lewis
- One Tree Point
- Padstow
- Padstow Heights
- Panania
- Picnic Point
- Potts Hill
- Punchbowl (Note: with parts within the City of Canterbury)
- Regents Park
- Revesby
- Revesby Heights
- Sefton
- Villawood
- Yagoona

== History ==
The water tower, known as Bankstown Reservoir, is a heritage item managed by Sydney Water. In 1826, bushrangers were hanged on this site.

=== Early history and development ===
The traditional Aboriginal inhabitants of the land now known as the Canterbury-Bankstown were the Dharug (Darag, Daruk, Dharuk) and Eora peoples. Early indigenous groups relied upon the riparian network of the Georges River and Cooks River catchments towards Botany Bay, with extant reminders of this lifestyle dating back 3,000 years including rock and overhang paintings, stone scrapers, middens and axe grinding grooves.

Following the arrival of Europeans in 1788, the new British settlers in the area burned oyster shells from the middens along Cooks River to produce lime for use in building mortar. The first incursions and eventual land grants in the area by Europeans led to increasing tensions, culminating in a confrontation between Europeans and a group of Aboriginal people led by Tedbury, the son of Pemulwuy, in what is now Punchbowl in 1809. However, following Tedbury's death in 1810, resistance to European settlement generally ended.

The District of Bankstown was named by Governor Hunter in 1797 in honour of botanist Sir Joseph Banks. The area remained very rural until residential and suburban development followed the development of the Bankstown Railway Line with the passing of the Marrickville to Burwood Road Railway Act by the NSW Parliament in 1890, extending the rail line from Marrickville Station (later Sydenham Station) to Burwood Road (later Belmore Station) by 1895. With the passing of the Belmore to Chapel Road Railway Act in 1906, the line was extended further to Lakemba, Punchbowl and Bankstown by 1909. The railway formed an important part of the development of Bankstown, with rapid development following its construction – so much so that the commercial centre of Bankstown moved from its former position in Irish Town (Now Yagoona) on Liverpool Road to the vicinity of Bankstown railway station.

=== Establishment of Bankstown Council ===
In March 1895 a petition was submitted to the NSW Colonial Government by 109 residents of the Bankstown area, requesting the establishment of the "Municipal District of Bankstown" under the Municipalities Act, 1867. The petition was subsequently accepted and the Municipal District of Bankstown was proclaimed by Lieutenant Governor Sir Frederick Darley on 7 September 1895. The first six-member council, standing in one at-large constituency, was elected on 4 November 1895. With the passing of the Local Government Act 1906, the council area became known as the Municipality of Bankstown.

=== Administration ===
On 13 December 1933, the Minister for Local Government Eric Spooner dismissed Bankstown council for the first time, which was also the first time the minister's power to dismiss a council was exercised under the Local Government Act, 1919. Spooner dismissed the council as a result of an inquiry into the council's awarding of a sanitary contract, which had recommended that the council seek further tenders for the contract as a result of an irregular and deficient original tender process, and that there was a clear implication that there had been undue influence involved in the awarding of the contract. After the council refused to accept these findings, and resolved to award the contract as originally intended, Spooner dismissed the council the next day and appointed the inquiry commissioner, William Robert Wylie, Inspector of Local Government Accounts, as administrator until fresh elections could be held in December 1934.

On 3 March 1954, the Minister for Local Government Jack Renshaw dismissed Bankstown council and appointed the Chief Inspector of Local Government, Henry William Dane, as administrator. Renshaw announced that the dismissal was due to the council being "not competent to discharge its responsibilities" after failing to act upon a report by the Department of Local Government that identified serious allegations of corruption and inappropriate acquisition methods for council materials by council's assistant electrical engineer, who was later dismissed in July 1954 following an official inquiry.

On 8 November 1963, Bankstown council was dismissed for the third time by the Minister for Local Government (Pat Hills), with Dane appointed for a second term as administrator, when five aldermen were charged with conspiracy to demand and receive payment in consideration of doing acts pertaining to aldermanic office. It was alleged the aldermen William Thomas Delauney, Charles Henry Little, Georgen Allardice Johnstone, Alfred Frederick McGuren and Murt O'Brien, were involved in a conspiracy to seek £5,000 each for ensuring that a Lendlease proposal for a shopping centre in Bankstown was approved. On 7 April 1965, Delauney and another accused who was not an alderman, Martin Goode, pled guilty to the charges, while the remaining four went to trial at the District Court of New South Wales (prosecuted by John Slattery QC and presided over by Justice Christopher Monahan). The Crown's case relied upon tape recordings of the accused, which the judge ruled as admissible despite an admission from the Crown that they had been illegally obtained. On 13 April 1965, Justice Monahan acquitted McGuren and O'Brien on the basis that there was insufficient evidence to connect them to the conspiracy. On 15 April 1965, Johnstone was acquitted and Little was found guilty, with Judge Monahan sentencing him, along with Delauney and Goode (who had pled guilty), to 12-months in prison.

=== City status and later history ===
Bankstown's city status was proclaimed in 1980 in the presence of Queen Elizabeth II, becoming the "City of Bankstown". On 12 May 2016, the City of Bankstown was merged with the City of Canterbury to form the Canterbury-Bankstown Council.

== Council seats ==
=== Council Chambers (1918) ===
The second Council Chambers on South Terrace, Bankstown, was the council seat from 1918 to 1963.

On 29 June 1918 the new Council Chambers building located on South Terrace south of the Bankstown railway station (now No. 9 Bankstown City Plaza) was officially opened by the mayor, A. Townsend. Completed to a cost of £4,000, the new Council Chambers building was designed by prominent architect and mayor of Kogarah, Charles Herbert Halstead, and built by A. G. Swane. At the time of opening the street frontage included a post office, and a branch of the Australian Bank of Commerce. This remained the Council's primary meeting place and offices until new offices in the Civic Centre to the north were completed in 1963.

=== Civic Centre and Council Chambers (1963) ===
By the early 1960s, Bankstown Council sought a new headquarters that would be able to accommodate a growing organisation as well as provide a new 'civic centre' for the Council area. In 1961, the council commissioned a modernist design by architect Kevin Curtin, which envisaged a complex of an Administration Building, a Council Chamber roundhouse, and a Town Hall with the capacity for 1,500 people, to be located on a large block north of the Bankstown railway station between Chapel Road, Rickard Road, Appian Way and The Mall. The Council Chambers was the first building completed and took the form of a roundhouse and was built by Monier Builders Pty Ltd, with the interior fittings and furniture designed by Maison Paul Pty Ltd of Greenacre, featuring timberwork in Queensland walnut timber (Endiandra palmerstonii). The consulting engineers for the project were M. G. Bull (structural) and John R. Wallis, Spratt & Associates (electrical and mechanical).

==== Administration building ====
The administration building was officially opened on 2 December 1963. It was built to house the majority of council's staff and departments, and was a two-storey square block with an external colonnade and basement level for parking. The rates, health & building, and Town Clerk's departments were located on the ground floor, while the upper floor contained the engineering and planning departments. The building's main lobby featured a mosaic mural by Michael Santry depicting the history of Bankstown, in addition to marble-clad columns, timber panelling, and terrazzo floors. In 1964, the exterior lighting of the Civic Centre received an award for meritorious lighting from the Australian Illuminating Engineering Society. In 1966 a new fountain, the "Dane Fountain", was unveiled outside the building to commemorate the service of H. W. Dane as administrator of the council.

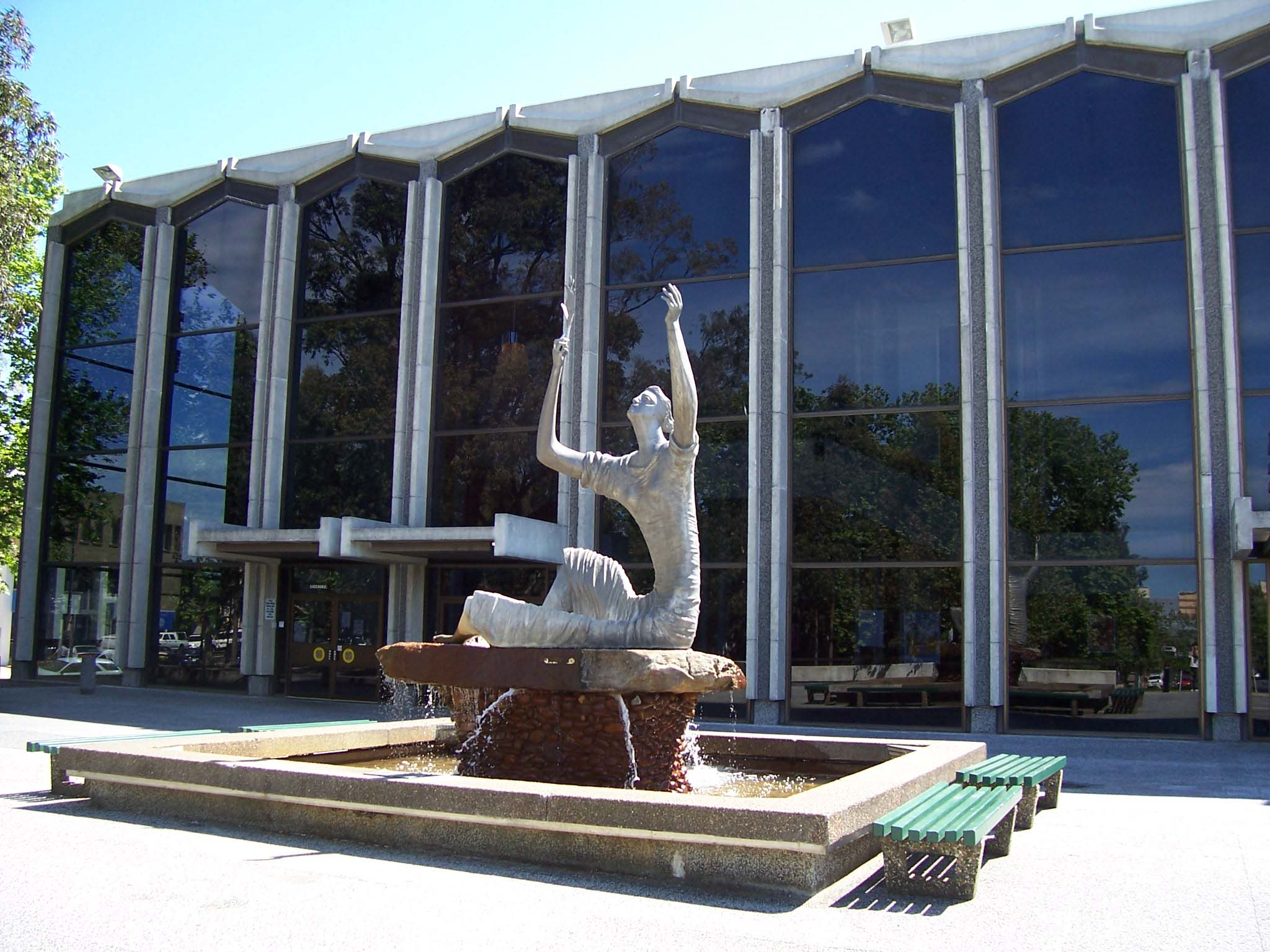
The 'Spirit of Botany' in its second location in front of Bankstown Town Hall.

On Tuesday 1 July 1997, a fire in the building, caused by a spark from maintenance works to bring the building up to modern standards, resulted in the complete destruction of the Administration Building, along with a large number of council records and historical items. With the Council offices relocated to the nearby Bankstown Civic Tower, the remains of the Administration Building were cleared and its site became the location for a new central park which was officially named Paul Keating Park on 13 June 2000.

==== Spirit of Botany ====
In 1963, as part of the works to complete the new Bankstown Civic Centre, the council commissioned sculptor Alan Ingham to create a memorial statue to Sir Joseph Banks. Ingham accepted on the basis that he would create a statue that would be to the 'spirit of botany', a more abstract representation of Banks' work in the field, that would blend with the modernist style of the new Civic Centre: "It would be controversial and create far more interest than a statue of the man". The cast aluminium statue was officially unveiled on 7 April 1964 atop a base of rocks. When the Town Hall was completed in 1973, the statue was moved to the Town Hall forecourt as part of a fountain. In 2012 as part of the Bankstown Library and Knowledge Centre project the statue was moved again to a more prominent location further south at the south-western corner of Paul Keating Park.

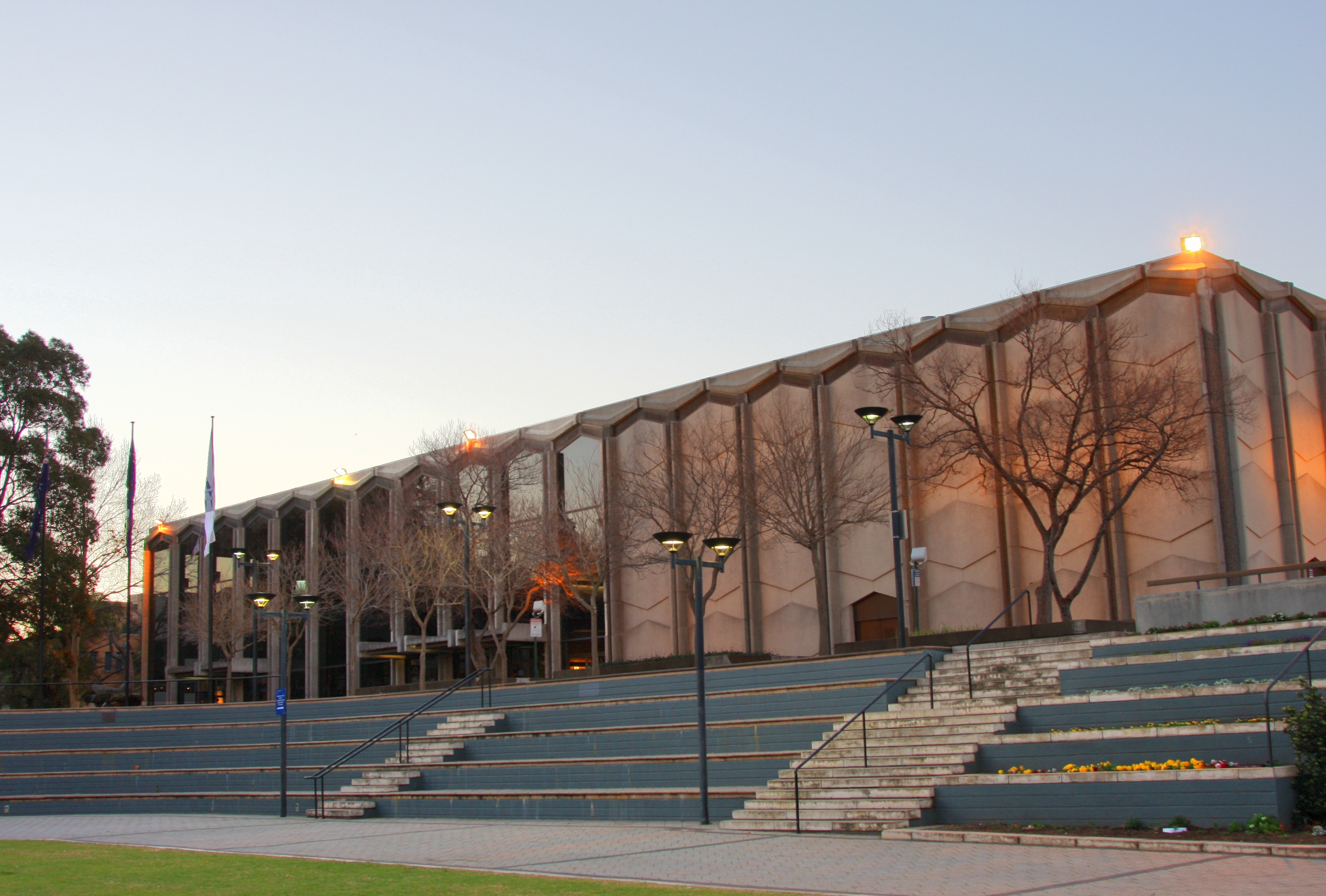
The Bankstown Town Hall, pictured in 2010 before the right section was demolished in 2013 for the new library.

==== Town hall ====
The final element of the Civic Centre to be completed was the town hall, designed as a theatre for 1,500 people, at the north-western end of the site. It was officially opened on 30 June 1973 by Prime Minister Gough Whitlam. The Town Hall project was overseen by Civil and Civic (a Lendlease subsidiary). In 2013, the Town Hall was upgraded and redeveloped as part of the Bankstown Library and Knowledge Centre project to become a 300-seat theatre named the "Bryan Brown Theatre", with the eastern side demolished and replaced by a new Library and "Knowledge Centre".

=== Civic Tower ===
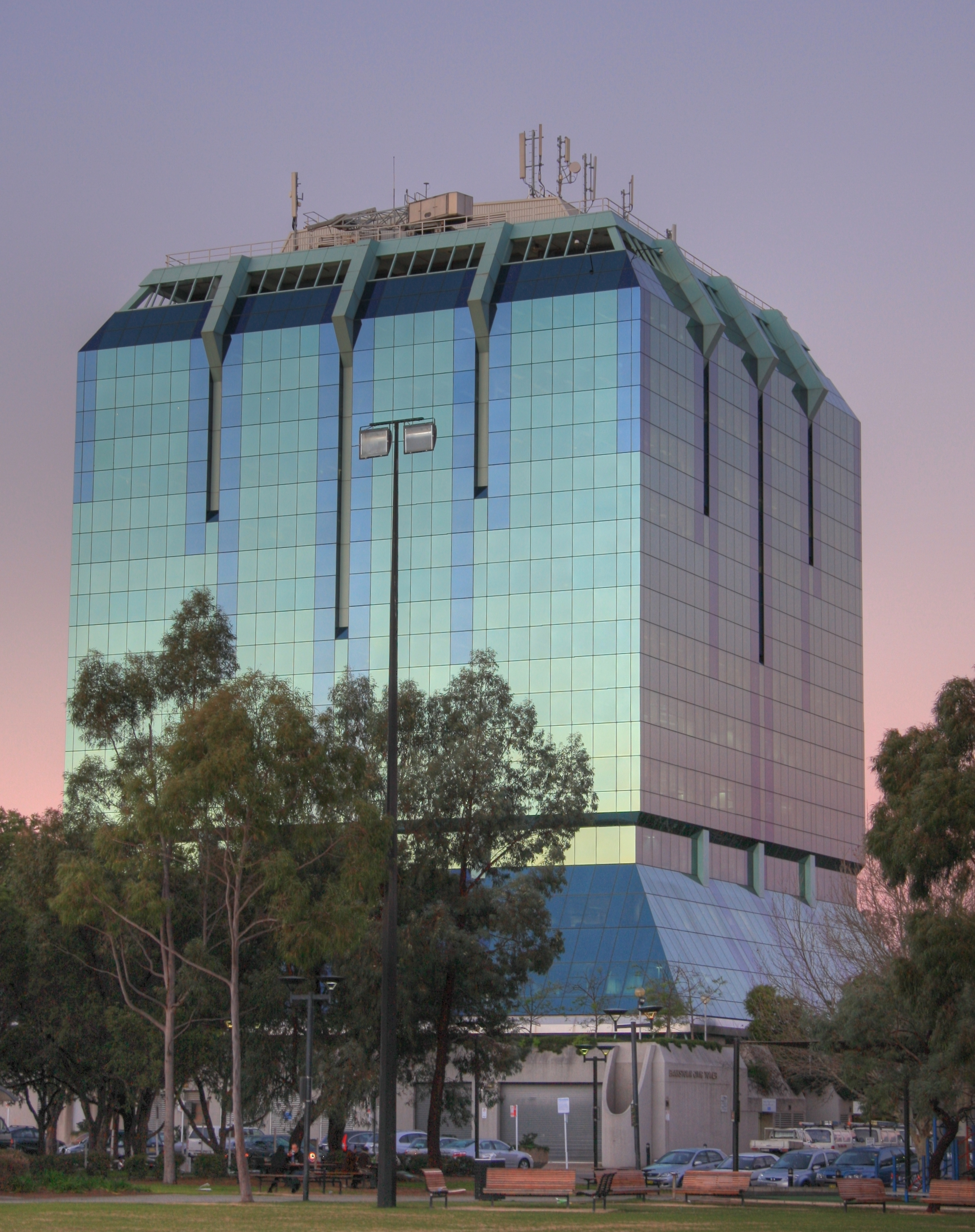
Bankstown Civic Tower, opened in 1990, was the primary offices of Bankstown council from 1997–2016. It is now the offices of the City of Canterbury Bankstown.

In 1989, Council commissioned a new 14-storey "Civic Tower" office building at 66-72 Rickard Road to accommodate additional council staff, state government agencies, and rented office space. With construction beginning in 1990, the tower was complete by 1991. The Civic Tower became the primary Council offices from 1997 to 1999 following the destruction of the Administration Building.

== Demographics ==
At the 2011 Census, there were 182,352 people in the Bankstown local government area, of these 49.3% were male and 50.7% were female. Aboriginal and Torres Strait Islander people made up 0.8% of the population. The median age of people in the City of Bankstown was 35 years, which is slightly lower than the national median of 37 years. Children aged 0 – 14 years made up 21.7% of the population and people aged 65 years and over made up 13.7% of the population. Of people in the area aged 15 years and over, 52.1% were married and 11.0% were either divorced or separated.

Population growth in the City of Bankstown between the 2001 Census and the 2006 Census was 3.43%; and in the subsequent five years to the 2011 Census, population growth was 6.96%. When compared with total population growth of Australia for the same periods, being 5.78% and 8.32% respectively, population growth in Bankstown local government area was approximately 75% of the national average. The median weekly income for residents within the City of Bankstown was slightly lower than the national average.

At the 2011 Census, the proportion of residents in the Bankstown local government area who stated their ancestry as Lebanese, was in excess of eight times the national average. The proportion of residents who stated an affiliation with Islam was in excess of eleven times the national average. Meanwhile, as at the Census date, the area was linguistically diverse, with Arabic or Vietnamese languages spoken in 30% of households, both languages approximately seven times the national averages.

Selected historical census data for Bankstown local government area
Census year		2001	2006	2011
Population	Estimated residents on Census night	164,841	170,489	182,352
Population	LGA rank in terms of size within New South Wales			6th
Population	% of New South Wales population			2.64%
Population	% of Australian population	0.88%	▼0.86%	▼0.85%
Cultural and language diversity				
Ancestry, top responses	Australian			15.2%
Ancestry, top responses	Lebanese			14.9%
Ancestry, top responses	English			12.5%
Ancestry, top responses	Vietnamese			7.2%
Ancestry, top responses	Chinese			6.3%
Language, top responses (other than English)	Arabic	13.6%	▲19.3%	▲21.2%
Language, top responses (other than English)	Vietnamese	7.2%	▲8.3%	▲9.1%
Language, top responses (other than English)	Greek	4.1%	▼3.8%	▼3.6%
Language, top responses (other than English)	Cantonese	3.0%	▲3.2%	3.2%
Language, top responses (other than English)	Mandarin	n/c	▲1.9%	▲2.3%
Religious affiliation				
Religious affiliation, top responses	Catholic	31.1%	▼29.6%	▼28.0%
Religious affiliation, top responses	Islam	11.9%	▲15.2%	▲19.1%
Religious affiliation, top responses	Anglican	15.5%	▼12.5%	▼10.2%
Religious affiliation, top responses	Eastern Orthodox	8.7%	▼8.6%	▼8.5%
Religious affiliation, top responses	No Religion	6.3%	▲7.1%	▲8.3%
Median weekly incomes				
Personal income	Median weekly personal income		A$372	A$428
Personal income	% of Australian median income		79.8%	74.2%
Family income	Median weekly family income		A$926	A$1,228
Family income	% of Australian median income		90.2%	82.9%
Household income	Median weekly household income		A$1,069	A$1,091
Household income	% of Australian median income		91.3%	88.4%

== Council ==
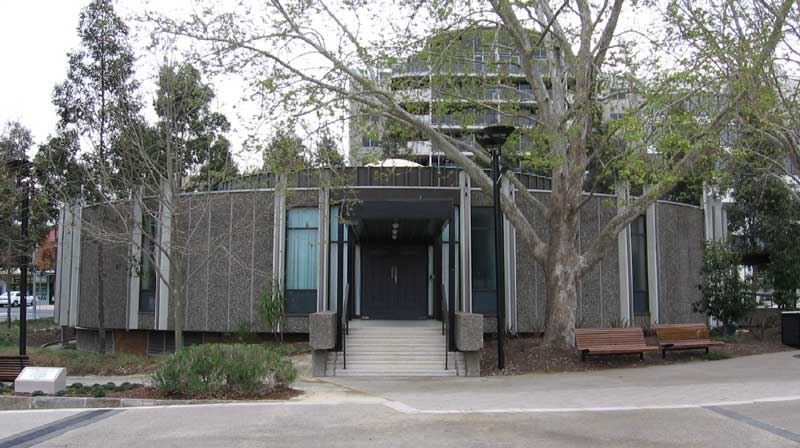
Bankstown Council Chambers, designed in 1963 by Kevin J. Curtin & Partners, adjacent to Paul Keating Park in Bankstown, was the council seat from 1963 to 2016. It is now the seat of the City of Canterbury Bankstown, and was the location of the first council meeting on 24 May 2016.

=== Final composition and election method ===
Bankstown City Council was composed of twelve councillors elected proportionally as four separate wards, each electing three councillors. All councillors were elected for a fixed four-year term of office. The mayor was elected by the councillors at the first meeting of the council. The most recent and last election was held on 8 September 2012, and the makeup of the council prior to its abolition was as follows:

Ward	Councillor	Party	Notes
East Ward	Khal Asfour	Labor	Mayor 2011–2014, 2015–2016 Deputy Mayor 2008–2011.
East Ward	Naji Najjar	Liberal	
East Ward	Dan Nguyen	Labor	Deputy Mayor 2015–2016.
North Ward	Alex Kuskoff	Labor	
North Ward	Michael Tadros	Liberal	
North Ward	Jenny Golledge	Labor	
South Ward	Jim Daniel	Liberal	
South Ward	Linda Downey	Labor	Mayor 2014–2015.
South Ward	Scott Parker	Independent	Deputy Mayor 2012–2014.
West Ward	Glen Waud	Liberal	
West Ward	Ian Stromborg	Labor	
West Ward	Allan Winterbottom	Labor	Deputy Mayor 2011–2012, 2014–2015.

== Mayors and General Managers ==
=== Mayors ===
#	Mayor	Party	Term	Notes
1	Joseph James Cooper	Independent	7 November 1895 – 11 June 1896	
2	Ines Peter Miller	Independent	11 June 1896 – 16 February 1899	
3	Nicholas Goyen, Jnr	Independent	16 February 1899 – 15 February 1900	
4	William Gilliver	Independent	15 February 1900 – 12 February 1903	
5	Arthur Bransgrove	Independent	12 February 1903 – 16 February 1905	
6	William John Gibson	Independent	16 February 1905 – 1 March 1908	
7	William Henry Watson	Independent	1 March 1908 – 28 February 1909	
–	William Gilliver	Independent	1 March 1909 – 28 February 1911	
–	Arthur Bransgrove	Independent	1 March 1911 – 28 February 1913	
8	Frederick George White	Independent	1 March 1913 – August 1913	
9	John Arthur Hoskins	Independent	August 1913 – 8 February 1915	
–	William John Gibson	Independent	8 February 1915 – July 1917	
10	Alfred Townsend	Independent	July 1917 – 1917	
11	James Hunter Lee	Labor	1917 – February 1918	
–	Alfred Townsend	Independent	February 1918 – 4 February 1919	
12	Cornelius Manahan	Labor	4 February 1919 – February 1920	
13	John George Graf	Labor	February 1920 – 7 December 1920	
14	David Kennedy	Labor	7 December 1920 – 6 December 1921	
15	John Jensen	Labor	6 December 1921 – 5 December 1922	
–	David Kennedy	Labor	5 December 1922 – December 1923	
16	Percy James George Coleman	Labor	December 1923 – December 1924	
17	Charles Edward Hercules Griffiths	Independent	December 1924 – December 1925	
18	Michael Joseph Fitzpatrick	Independent	December 1925 – December 1926	
19	Patrick John O'Neill	Labor	December 1926 – December 1927	
20	William Mannell	Labor	December 1927 – December 1928	
21	Charles Arthur Welch	Independent	December 1928 – 3 December 1929	
22	Patrick Clancy	Labor	3 December 1929 – 8 December 1930	
–	Michael Joseph Fitzpatrick	Independent	8 December 1930 – 7 January 1932	
–	Charles Edward Hercules Griffiths	Independent	7 January 1932 – 5 December 1932	
23	James Cragg	Independent	5 December 1932 – 4 December 1933	
–	Charles Edward Hercules Griffiths	Independent	4 December 1933 – 13 December 1933	
–	William Robert Wylie (Administrator)		13 December 1933 – 1 December 1934	
–	James Cragg	Reform	3 December 1934 – 2 December 1935	
24	James Gosling	Reform	2 December 1935 – 13 December 1937	
–	Percy James George Coleman	Labor	13 December 1937 – 11 December 1939	
25	Thomas James Stevens	Labor	11 December 1939 – December 1940	
–	Charles Edward Hercules Griffiths	Independent	December 1940 – December 1941	
26	A. H. Middleton	Independent	December 1941 – 24 December 1942	
27	William Flood	Labor	24 December 1942 – 9 December 1943	
28	Stephen Everard Roberts	Independent	9 December 1943 – December 1944	
–	Percy James George Coleman	Labor	December 1944 – 12 December 1946	
29	Clarence Williams	Independent	12 December 1946 – 4 December 1947	
30	Arthur Henry Smith	Independent	4 December 1947 – December 1949	
31	Alfred James Johnston	Independent	December 1949 – 7 December 1950	
32	Blanche Barkl	Independent	7 December 1950 – 26 December 1951	
33	Albert Edward Abel	Labor	26 December 1951 – 15 December 1953	
–	Blanche Barkl	Independent	15 December 1953 – 3 March 1954	
–	Henry William Dane (Administrator)		3 March 1954 – 1 December 1956	
34	Joseph McCann	Independent	December 1956 – December 1957	
35	Charles Henry Little	Independent	December 1957 – December 1959	
36	Murt O'Brien	Independent	December 1959 – December 1960	
37	Douglas Burleigh Carruthers	Independent	December 1960 – December 1961	
38	Joseph McCann	Independent	December 1961 – December 1962	
–	Douglas Burleigh Carruthers	Independent	December 1962 – 8 November 1963	
–	Henry William Dane (Administrator)		8 November 1963 – 4 December 1965	
39	Ron Lockwood	Independent	December 1965 – December 1967	
–	Douglas Burleigh Carruthers	Independent	December 1967 – December 1970	
40	Frank McIlveen	Independent	December 1970 – September 1971	
–	Ron Lockwood	Independent	September 1971 – September 1977	
41	Roger Bowman	Labor	September 1977 – September 1979	
42	Ray McCormack	Labor	September 1979 – September 1984	
43	Gordon Parker	Independent	September 1984 – 21 June 1985	
44	Max Parker	Independent	June 1985 – September 1985	
45	Kevin Hill	Labor	September 1985 – September 1988	
46	Ian Stromborg	Labor	September 1988 – September 1991	
47	Ray Buchanan	Labor	September 1991 – September 1992	
–	Kevin Hill	Labor	September 1992 – September 1993	
48	Phil Lopez	Independent	September 1993 – September 1994	
–	Max Parker	Independent	September 1994 – September 1995	
49	Grant Lee	Labor	September 1995 – September 1996	
–	Kevin Hill	Labor	September 1996 – September 1998	
–	Ian Stromborg	Labor	September 1998 – September 2000	
–	Kevin Hill	Labor	September 2000 – September 2001	
50	David Blake	Labor	September 2001 – September 2002	
51	Helen Westwood	Labor	September 2002 – 1 September 2006	
51	Tania Mihailuk	Labor	1 September 2006 – 27 June 2011	
52	Khal Asfour	Labor	27 June 2011 – 16 September 2014	
53	Linda Downey	Labor	16 September 2014 – 21 September 2015	
–	Khal Asfour	Labor	21 September 2015 – 12 May 2016	

=== Town clerks and general managers ===
Town clerk and general manager	Term	Notes
George Moss	7 November 1895 – 14 November 1895	
Richard Peek	14 November 1895 – December 1906	
Arthur R. Peek	30 March 1907 – 31 October 1912	
Donald N. Morrison	February 1913 – 24 July 1913	
G. Thompson (acting)	28 January 1913 – 6 August 1913	
John Glassop	6 August 1913 – November 1918	
Lindsay S. Gibson	November 1918 – 2 December 1921	
W. G. Miller	1 January 1922 – 5 February 1929	
Henry Emmett Harden	1929 – 23 March 1936	
H. E. Maiden	May 1936 – 1946	
Cosmo Christopher Egan	1946 – 1958	
Colin Gallimore Saunders	1958 – 1978	
Arthur B. Heiler	1978 – 1994	
Mark Fitzgibbon	1994 – 1999	
Richard Colley	2000 – 2007	
Wayne Carter	2007 – 2008	
Klaus Kerzinger (acting)	2008 – 25 August 2009	
Luke Nicholls	25 August 2009 – August 2011	
Matthew Stewart	August 2011 – 12 May 2016	

== Geography ==
The former Bankstown City region was approximately 76 square kilometres (29 sq mi) and had a population density of about 21.46 people per hectare. The boundaries of the former Bankstown City were, clockwise, the Prospect water supply pipeline and Liverpool Road (also known as Hume Highway) along the north, Roberts Road, Juno Parade, Koala Road, Punchbowl Road, Canterbury Road and the Salt Pan Creek along the east, the Georges River in the south and the Georges River, Prospect Creek, the Hume Highway and Woodville Road along the west. Salt Pan Creek is a saltmarsh and mangrove swamp that extends from Canterbury Road to Georges River.

=== Parks ===
Bankstown had 293 parks covering 730 hectares (1,800 acres) within its city limits. There are 41 sports grounds, 12 community parks and 18 natural parklands. In the CBD, major parks include Bankstown Oval, McLeod Reserve, Paul Keating Park and Bankstown City Gardens. Other major parks include Mirambeena Regional Park, The Crest, Middleton Park, O'Neill Park, Terry Lamb Complex, Garrison Point, Jensen Oval and the extensive parklands around Georges River, among others. The entrance to Georges River National Park is also located within the city.

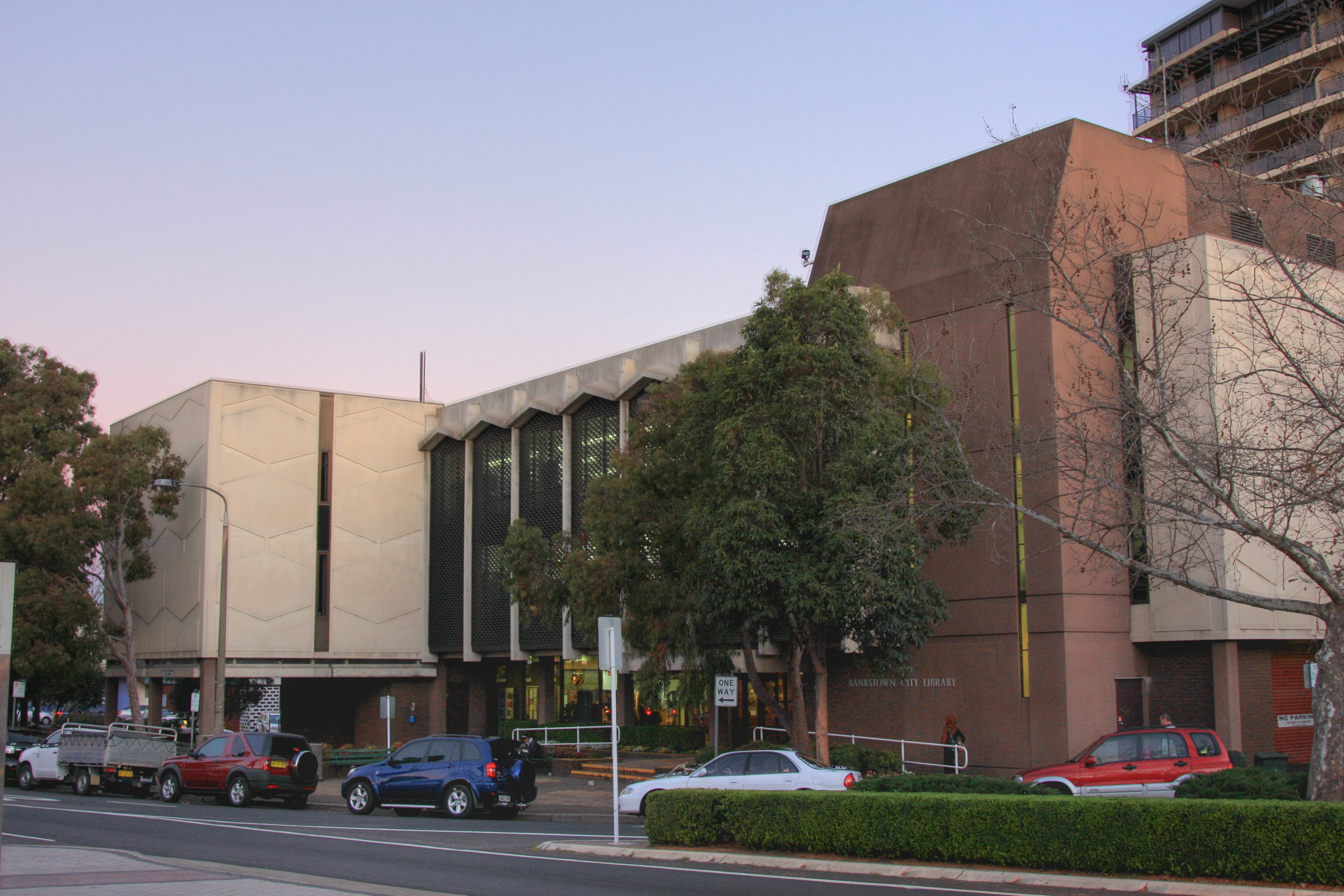
The three-storey complex of Bankstown City Library, opened in 1983 and closed in 2013.

Paul Keating Park, in the centre of Bankstown, stands on the old site of the Council Administration building, which burned down in an accidental fire in 1997, and was named in 2000 for former prime minister and local MP for Blaxland, Paul Keating. The Park is used for a variety of concerts and festivals, and is otherwise a large playing field.

== Libraries ==
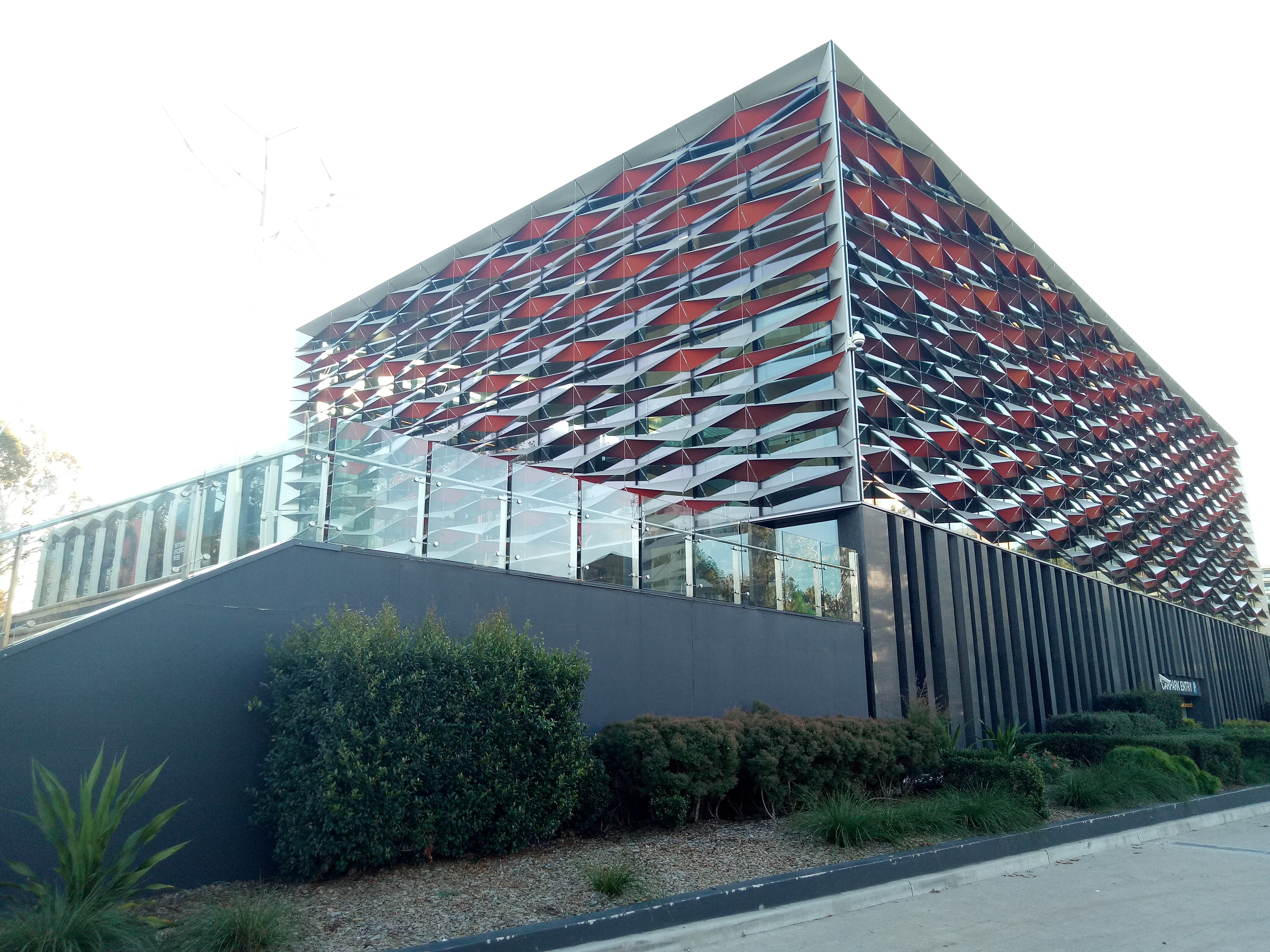
The Bankstown Library and Knowledge Centre next to the Town Hall, designed by Francis-Jones Morehen Thorp, was opened in 2013.

In 1946, Bankstown became the first municipality in Western Sydney to adopt the Library Act 1939 by opening a Children's Library, located at Restwell Street. A central branch library was established on The Mall in Bankstown in 1954, followed by a mobile library service from 1955. In 1958–1961, three more branch libraries were opened in Chester Hill, Greeacre and Padstow, followed by a branch in Panania in 1968. The original Bankstown City Library was demolished in 1981 to make way for a much larger 2700sqm facility, which officially opened on 28 May 1983.

In 2013, the Bankstown City Library was closed when the new "Bankstown Library and Knowledge Centre" next to the Town Hall was officially opened. Designed by architects Francis-Jones Morehen Thorp (FJMT), the new library has been praised by the NSW Government Architect as a "reference for better design quality across the town centre" and as having "expanded the traditional idea of what a public library is, becoming a welcoming and socially engaging community hub". In 2015 the design received the Australian Institute of Architects Emil Sodersten Award for Interior Architecture, the Australian Institute of Architects (NSW Chapter) John Verge Award for Interior Architecture and Commendation for Public Architecture.

== Sister cities ==
Sister Cities of Bankstown include:

- (Australia) Broken Hill, a city in remote New South Wales. Bankstown signed its first Sister City Agreement with Broken Hill on 16 September 1986.
- Suita, Osaka, Japan. Bankstown signed its first international Sister City agreement with Suita City, Japan, in March 1989.
- Colorado Springs, Colorado, United States. Colorado students in Bankstown signed a new Sister City Agreement with Colorado Springs, home of the United States Olympic Committee, on 13 July 2001.
- Yangcheon-gu City, Seoul, South Korea. In 1997, Bankstown signed a Friendship Agreement with Yangcheon-gu City in South Korea, resulting in the establishment of youth exchanges and the sharing of information between both local authorities. During a tour in 2001, Bankstown Council delegates met with Korean officials to discuss ways of promoting Bankstown companies with a view to creating new export markets. The Cities exchanged details of Management Planning Processes and inspections of community facilities took place in Yangcheon. A Sister City Agreement was subsequently signed with Yangcheon City in September 2002.
- Shijiazhuang, Hebei, China. In February 2000 a friendship agreement was made between Shijiazhuang City and Bankstown. The friendship agreement signifies that the two cities are exploring the possibility of venturing into a sister city agreement.

== Crest and logo ==
In 1963, to coincide with the official opening of the new Bankstown Civic Centre, Bankstown Council adopted a new civic badge to serve as the primary visual symbol of the council. It took the form of a royal blue and gold heraldic shield quartered into four fields by a white cross charged with a golden lion passant guardant from the Coat of Arms of New South Wales. The top left corner included a Southern Cross to represent Australia; A mace and mayoral chain in the top right corner to represent authority; A stork on an oak stump sprouting new branches in the bottom right corner and a fleur-de-lis in the bottom left corner are both taken from the coat of arms of Sir Joseph Banks, as are the blue and gold colours and white cross. A simple crown on top of the shield represents the monarchy of Queen Elizabeth II. The crest formed the primary logo of the council until 1995 when a logo featuring the 'Spirit of Botany' statue was adopted, which remained in use until the council's end in 2016.

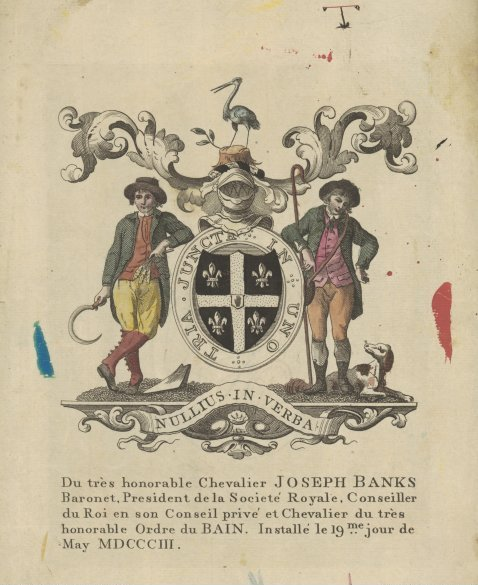
The coat of arms of Sir Joseph Banks as granted in 1803.

The 'crest' of Bankstown Council, as adopted in 1963.

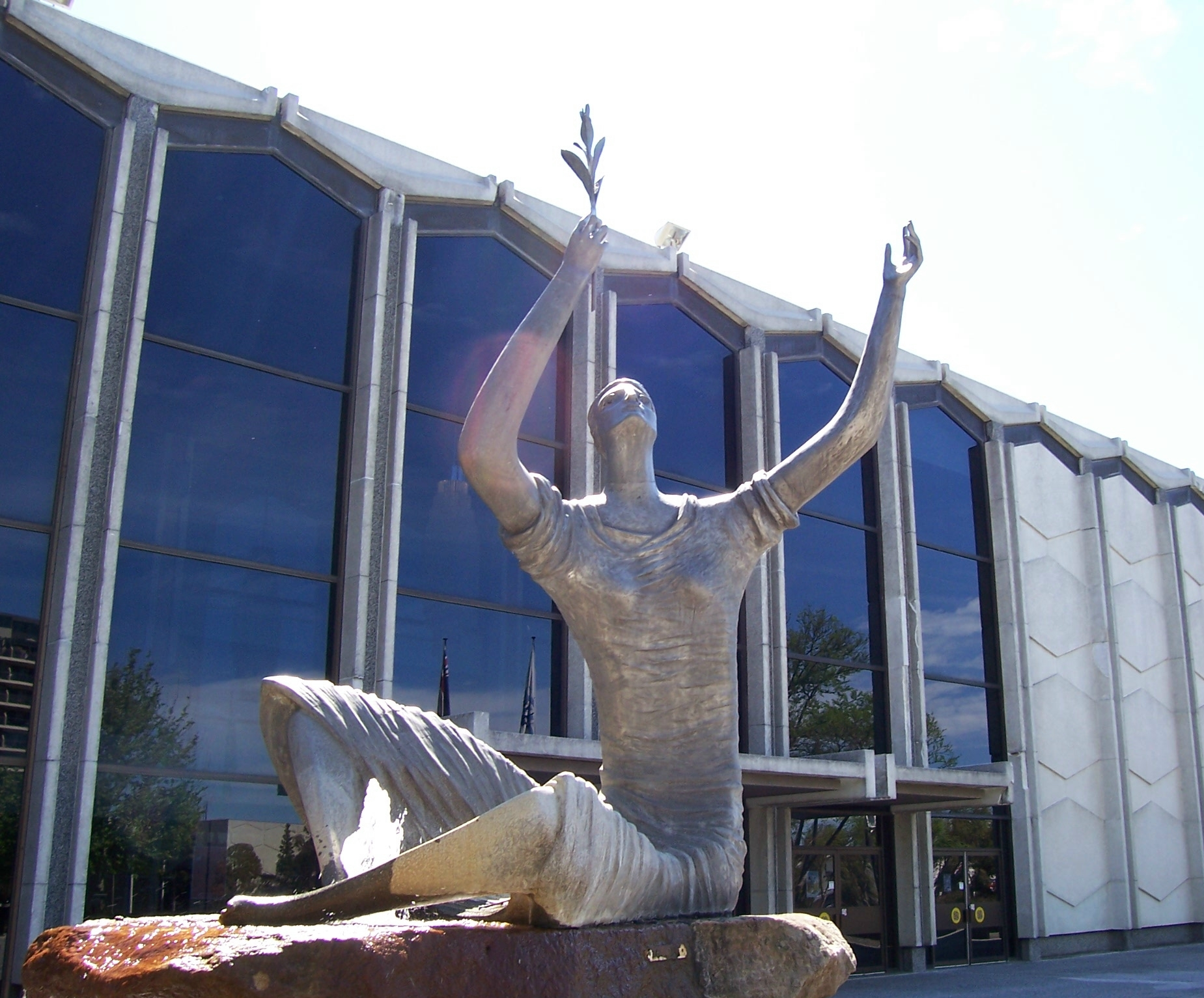
The 'Spirit of Botany' statue unveiled in 1964.

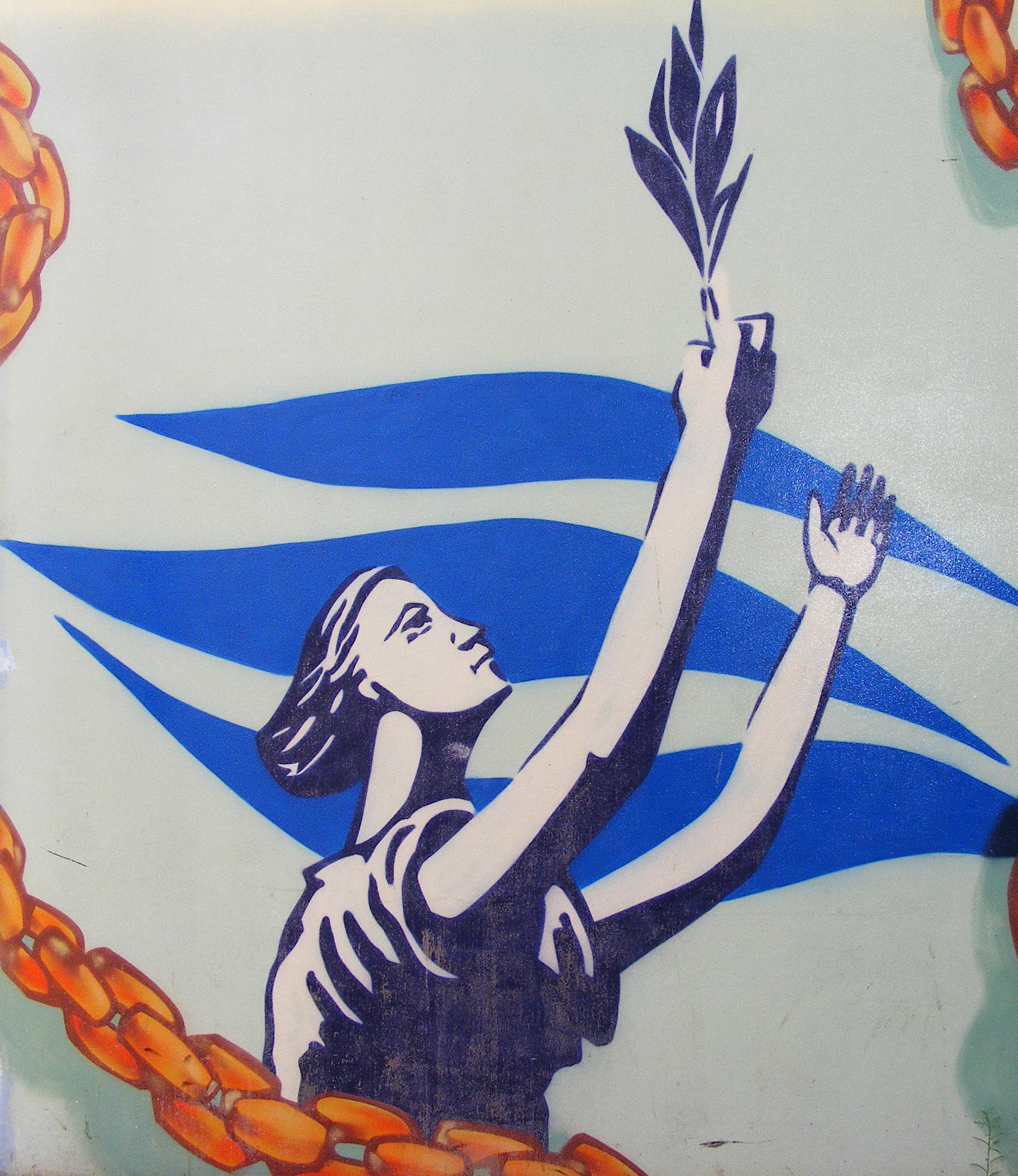
The 'Spirit of Botany' logo adopted in 1995
