= City of Canterbury Bankstown =

- Local government area
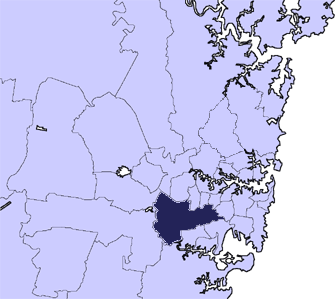
- Location in Metropolitan Sydney

- Interactive map of City of Canterbury Bankstown
- Country: Australia
- State: New South Wales
- Region: Canterbury-Bankstown; Inner West
- Established: 12 May 2016
- Council seat: Bankstown

Government
  - Mayor: Bilal El-Hayek
  - State electorate: Bankstown; Canterbury; East Hills; Strathfield; Summer Hill
  - Federal division: *Banks; Barton; Blaxland; Grayndler; Watson

Area
  - Total: 110.8 km^{2} (42.8 sq mi)

Population
  - Totals: 371,006 (2021 census) (2nd in NSW; 5th in Australia); 379,829 (2023 est.)
  - Density: 3,348.4/km^{2} (8,672/sq mi)
- Website: City of Canterbury Bankstown
LGAs around City of Canterbury Bankstown
Cumberland	Strathfield	Burwood & Inner West
Liverpool	City of Canterbury Bankstown	Inner West
Sutherland	Georges River	Bayside

The City of Canterbury Bankstown, legally named Canterbury-Bankstown, is a local government area (LGA) in metropolitan Sydney, New South Wales, Australia. It is governed by Canterbury-Bankstown Council, branded as CBCity. The LGA was formed on 12 May 2016 from a merger of the City of Canterbury and the City of Bankstown, after a statewide review of local government by the NSW Government.

The City of Canterbury Bankstown comprises an area of 110.8 square kilometres (42.8 sq mi) and as per the 2021 census, had a population of 371,006 making it the second most populous local government area in New South Wales.

The current mayor is Bilal El-Hayek, a member of the Labor Party, who was elected on 11 May 2023.

== History ==
=== Early history ===
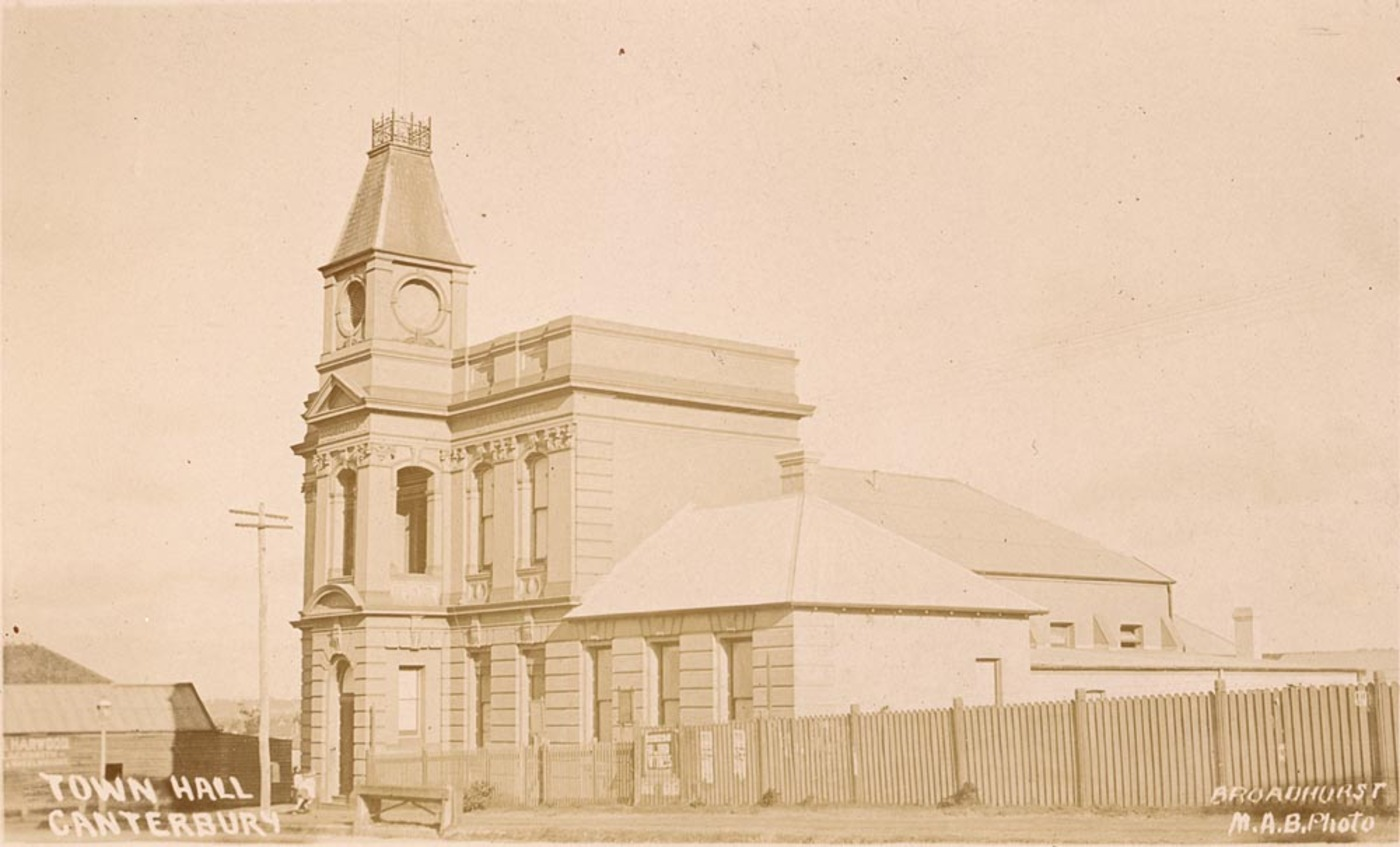
Canterbury Town Hall was opened in 1889. It was demolished in 1963.

The traditional Aboriginal inhabitants of the land now known as the Canterbury-Bankstown were the Dharug (Darag, Daruk, Dharuk) and Eora peoples. Early indigenous groups relied upon the riparian network of the Georges River and Cooks River catchments towards Botany Bay, with extant reminders of this lifestyle dating back 3,000 years including rock and overhang paintings, stone scrapers, middens and axe grinding grooves.

Following the arrival of the First Fleet in Sydney Cove in 1788, the new British settlers in the area burned oyster shells from the middens along Cooks River to produce lime for use in building mortar. In 1793, Rev Richard Johnson, a chaplain aboard the First Fleet, was the first to receive a land grant of 40 hectares and given the name Canterbury Vale. The land was located in the Ashbury-Hurlstone Park area. He named his estate 'Canterbury Vale', presumably after the See of Canterbury in England. The date of the grant was May 1793 although he (Johnson) occupied the land months earlier. Johnson also cultivated land around his cottage in Bridge St Sydney and at another location called the Brickfield near Central Station. Johnson was praised by Watkin Tench as being one of the best farmers in the colony.

The first incursions and eventual land grants in the area by Europeans led to increasing tensions, culminating in a confrontation between Europeans and a group of Aboriginal people led by Tedbury, the son of Pemulwuy, in what is now Punchbowl in 1809. However, following Tedbury's death in 1810, resistance to European settlement generally ended.

The District of Bankstown was named by Governor Hunter in 1797 in honour of botanist Sir Joseph Banks. The area remained very rural until residential and suburban development followed the development of the Bankstown railway line with the passing of the Marrickville to Burwood Road Railway Act by the NSW Parliament in 1890, extending the rail line from Marrickville Station (later Sydenham Station) to Burwood Road (later Belmore Station) by 1895. With the passing of the Belmore to Chapel Road Railway Act in 1906, the line was extended further to Lakemba, Punchbowl and Bankstown by 1909.

The first ambulance to service the area was in 1908. It was called the 'Canterbury District Ambulance Corps' and it used volunteers to transport patients to the hospital. A stretcher on wheels with a hooded cover over it (hand litter) was used to transport patients to the Western Suburbs Hospital. If a patient lived in an area around Belmore, the hand litter was transported by train from Campsie to Belmore, then it was pushed along the rough unsealed roads to the patients home, back to Belmore station, then taken by train to Campsie Station and along the streets to hospital.

The Canterbury District Memorial Hospital commenced business on 26 October 1929. The hospital was opened by Secretary for Public Works Buttenshaw. Prior to the opening of the hospital [in Canterbury], residents attended the Western Suburbs Hospital or the cottage hospital located in Marrickville, which was established in 1895.

In 1940, the events of World War II were made known to the residents of Canterbury-Bankstown. Men and women who were drafted had to report for duty at a drill hall located on Canterbury Road Belmore. Camps were set up in Canterbury Race Course and surrounding parks in the region. In that same year thousands of Australian troops travelled along the goods line to Darling Harbour, ready to embark for the Middle East.

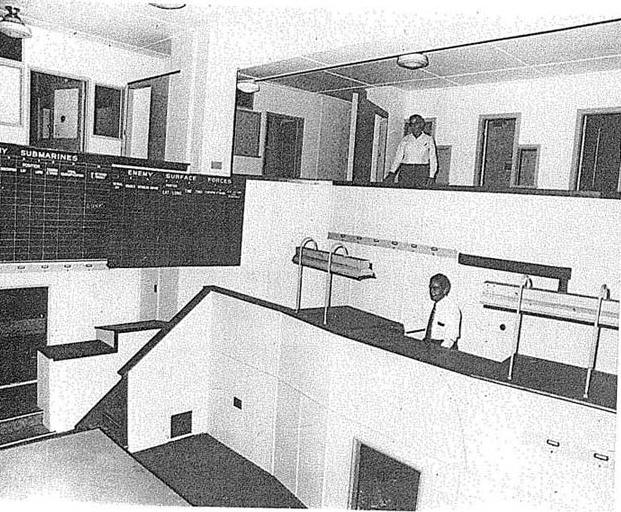
Australia's air defence headquarters during WW2, Bankstown Bunker, also known as No. 1 Fighter Sector RAAF

In 1940 the department of Civil Aviation purchased 250 hectares of land in Bankstown for the construction of Bankstown Airport and an RAAF Station was formed. The facility was a secondary airport to Mascot Airport. In 1942 a command bunker (Sydney Air Defence Headquarters) of semi underground construction was established on the corner of Edgar and Marion Street Bankstown. The bunker was manned by No. 1 Fighter Sector RAAF, members of the No.2 Volunteer Air Observer Corps, the WAAAF's, the RAAF and the United States Army Air Forces. The primary use of the Sydney Air Defence Headquarters was the location, tracking and interception of all planes in the eastern area of the South West Pacific.

In 1941, WAAAF's were posted to Bankstown. The women were trained as clerks, wireless telegraphists, mess orderlies, drill instructors and drivers, a portion of these women were assigned to work in the command centre (Bankstown Bunker) located on Black Charlies Hill. In 1942, Belmore House, the current sight of today's Roselands Shopping Centre was used by the Australian Army for the training of troops. Tents on the property were used to house an infantry battalion and an ambulance corps. The site was vacated after a year. Units of the US Air Force were based in Bankstown after 1942, earning the suburb the nickname 'Yankstown'. Also in 1942 a military hospital was established for the U.S. Army at Herne Bay, now known as Riverwood. It was the largest military hospital in Australia during World War II. Known as the 118 General Hospital it consisted of 490 timber barracks-type buildings, which could house a total of 4,250 beds and accommodate up to 1,250 patients and 3,500 staff.

Within the same year 16 US fighter planes that were based at Bankstown airport flew over Canterbury racecourse at low altitude during a race meet. This was to let the Australian public, especially those of the district to know that they, their allies were there for their protection. Regardless of these events, punters were annoyed at the disruption caused.

From 1944 to 1945, a Volunteer Air Observer Corps operated in Bankstown. These volunteers were both male and female, were of 15 to 60 years of age and were given several weeks training. There were over 300 volunteers who worked in shifts that the air force called 'flights' 24 hours a day, seven days a week. This freed RAAF personnel for other duties. In 1945 Bankstown Airport was occupied by the British Fleet Air Arm, known as HMS Nabberley, and the RAAF by 1946.

=== Local government history ===
==== Canterbury ====
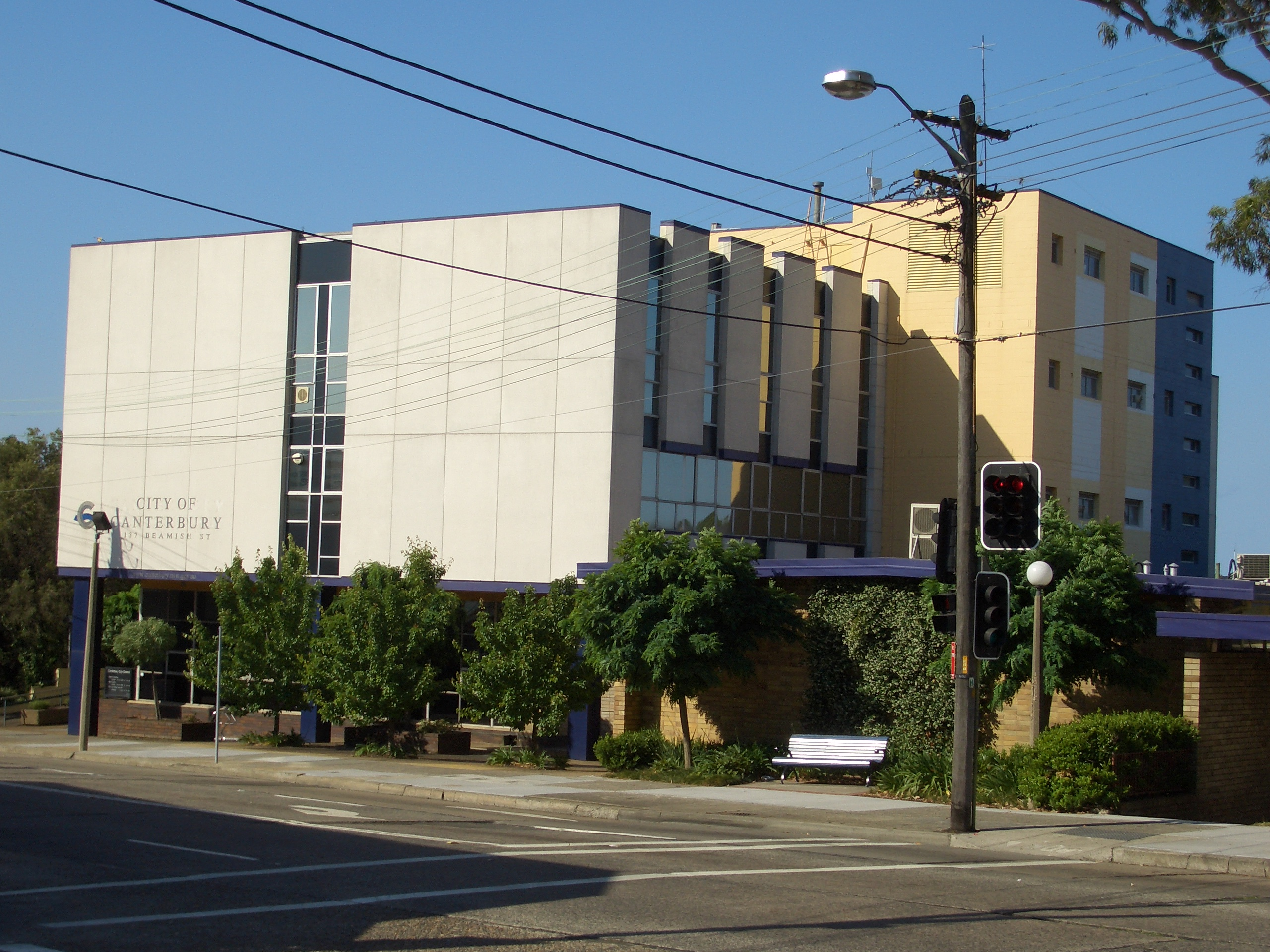
Canterbury Administration Building, located in Campsie, was the seat of the City of Canterbury from 1963 to 2016. It is now secondary offices for the City of Canterbury Bankstown.

After much petitioning of the NSW Government by local residents, the Municipality of Canterbury was proclaimed on 17 March 1879. The council first met in the home of the first mayor, Alderman John Sproule, and premises were then leased in the St Paul's Church schoolroom at 47-49 Canterbury Road, Canterbury. The Canterbury Town Hall, located on Canterbury Road between Canton and Howard Streets, was opened in 1889 by the Premier of New South Wales, Sir Henry Parkes. However, over time, Campsie became a more important centre, particularly along Beamish Street and Canterbury Council planned a gradual move of civic services there when funds became available. In 1954 a Baby Health Centre by Davey & Brindley opened on Beamish Street, followed by a library next door by Davey, Brindley & Vickery in 1958 at a cost of £30,000, and the municipal administration finally moved in 1963. At the time of its opening by the mayor R. J. Schofield on 26 September 1958, the Campsie Library was reputed to be the largest municipal library in Sydney. The Canterbury Municipal Administration Building designed by architects Whitehead & Payne, built by Rex Building Company Pty Ltd, and completed at a cost of £163,000 was opened adjacent to the Library and Baby Health Centre by the mayor, James S. Scott, on 21 September 1963. The City of Canterbury was proclaimed on 16 November 1993 by the Governor of New South Wales, Rear Admiral Peter Sinclair.

==== Bankstown ====
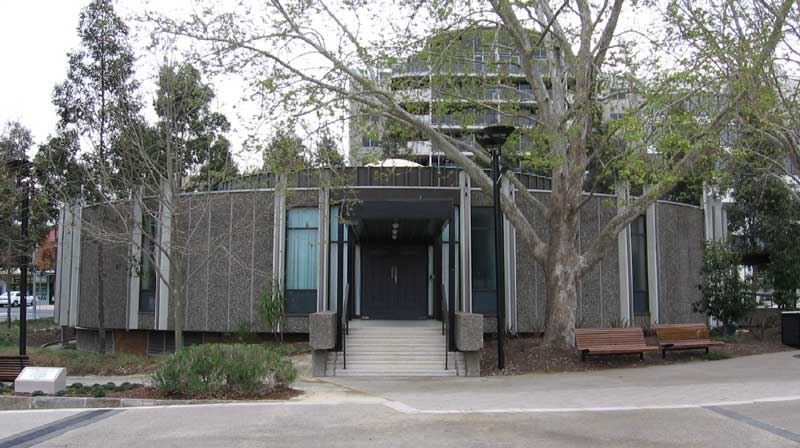
Bankstown Council Chambers, adjacent to Paul Keating Park in Bankstown, was the seat of the City of Bankstown from 1963 to 2016. It is now the seat of the City of Canterbury Bankstown, and was the location of the first council meeting on 24 May 2016.

In March 1895, a petition was submitted to the NSW Colonial Government by 109 residents of the Bankstown area, requesting the establishment of the "Municipal District of Bankstown" under the Municipalities Act, 1867. The petition was subsequently accepted and the "Municipal District of Bankstown" was proclaimed by Lieutenant Governor Sir Frederick Darley on 7 September 1895. The first six-member council, standing in one at-large constituency, was elected on 4 November 1895. With the passing of the Local Government Act 1906, the council area became known as the "Municipality of Bankstown".

Bankstown's city status was proclaimed in 1980 in the presence of Queen Elizabeth II, becoming the "City of Bankstown".

=== Establishment of Canterbury-Bankstown Council ===
A 2015 review of local government boundaries by the NSW Government Independent Pricing and Regulatory Tribunal recommended that the City of Canterbury merge with the City of Bankstown to form a new council with an area of 110 square kilometres (42 sq mi) and support a population of approximately 351,000. Following an independent review, on 12 May 2016 the Minister for Local Government announced, with the release of the Local Government (Council Amalgamations) Proclamation 2016, that the merger with the City of Bankstown would proceed with immediate effect, creating a new council with an area of 72 square kilometres (28 sq mi).

The council was initially under the management of Administrator Richard Colley until elections were held. The first meeting of the council was held at Bankstown Council Chambers on 24 May 2016. The former Bankstown General Manager, Matthew Stewart was proclaimed as the first General Manager of the council. Jim Montague PSM, Canterbury Council General Manager from 1983 to 2016, was initially proclaimed as a Deputy General Manager of the new Council, but retired two weeks after the proclamation.

At the first council meeting on 24 May 2016, the administrator, Richard Colley, resolved to adopt city status and the council name would be known as the "City of Canterbury Bankstown" by way of changing the council's trading name and business registration. However, as this act merely changed the trading name of the council, the legal name as proclaimed in 2016 remains "Canterbury-Bankstown Council", which can only be changed by official proclamation in the NSW Government Gazette under section 206 of the Local Government Act, 1993.

==== Proposed de-amalgamation ====
In 2021, the council began resolving a proposal to de-amalgamate the City of Canterbury Bankstown. The de-amalgamation would restore the former City of Canterbury and City of Bankstown to their original boundaries. In July 2022, the council began preparations to submit a business case to the NSW Government for approval.

At the ordinary council meeting on 28 November 2023, it was resolved that council would halt all work, and financial spending, on preparing its implementation plan to de-amalgamate, until such time the NSW Government gave an iron-clad commitment to fully fund the cost of any de-amalgamation, and all ongoing costs. However, in 2024, it was confirmed that a bill would be passed in parliament by the NSW Government which would indicate that the government would not foot the bill for any council wishing to de-amalgamate.

== Federal and state governance ==
The federal divisions of Barton, Banks, Blaxland, Grayndler and Watson are located within part or all of the region of Canterbury-Bankstown. The state electoral districts of Bankstown, Canterbury, East Hills and Lakemba are located within part or all of the region. It is a relatively safe region for the Labor party.

== Suburbs in the local government area ==
Suburbs in the City of Canterbury Bankstown area are:

- Ashbury (Note: with a minor portion within the Inner West Council)
- Bankstown
- Bankstown Aerodrome
- Bass Hill
- Birrong
- Belfield
- Belmore
- Beverly Hills (Note: with parts within Georges River Council)
- Campsie
- Canterbury
- Chester Hill (Note: with parts within Cumberland Council)
- Chullora
- Clemton Park
- Condell Park
- Croydon Park (Note: with parts within the Municipality of Burwood and the Inner West Council)
- Earlwood (Note: with a minor portion within Bayside Council)
- East Hills
- Georges Hall
- Greenacre (Note: with a minor portion within the Municipality of Strathfield)
- Hurlstone Park (Note: with a minor portion within the Inner West Council)
- Kingsgrove (Note: with parts within Georges River Council and Bayside Council)
- Lakemba
- Lansdowne
- Leightonfield
- Milperra
- Mount Lewis
- One Tree Point
- Narwee
- Padstow
- Padstow Heights
- Panania
- Picnic Point
- Potts Hill
- Punchbowl
- Regents Park
- Revesby
- Revesby Heights
- Riverwood
- Roselands
- Sefton
- Villawood (Note: with parts within the City of Fairfield)
- Wiley Park
- Yagoona

== Economy ==
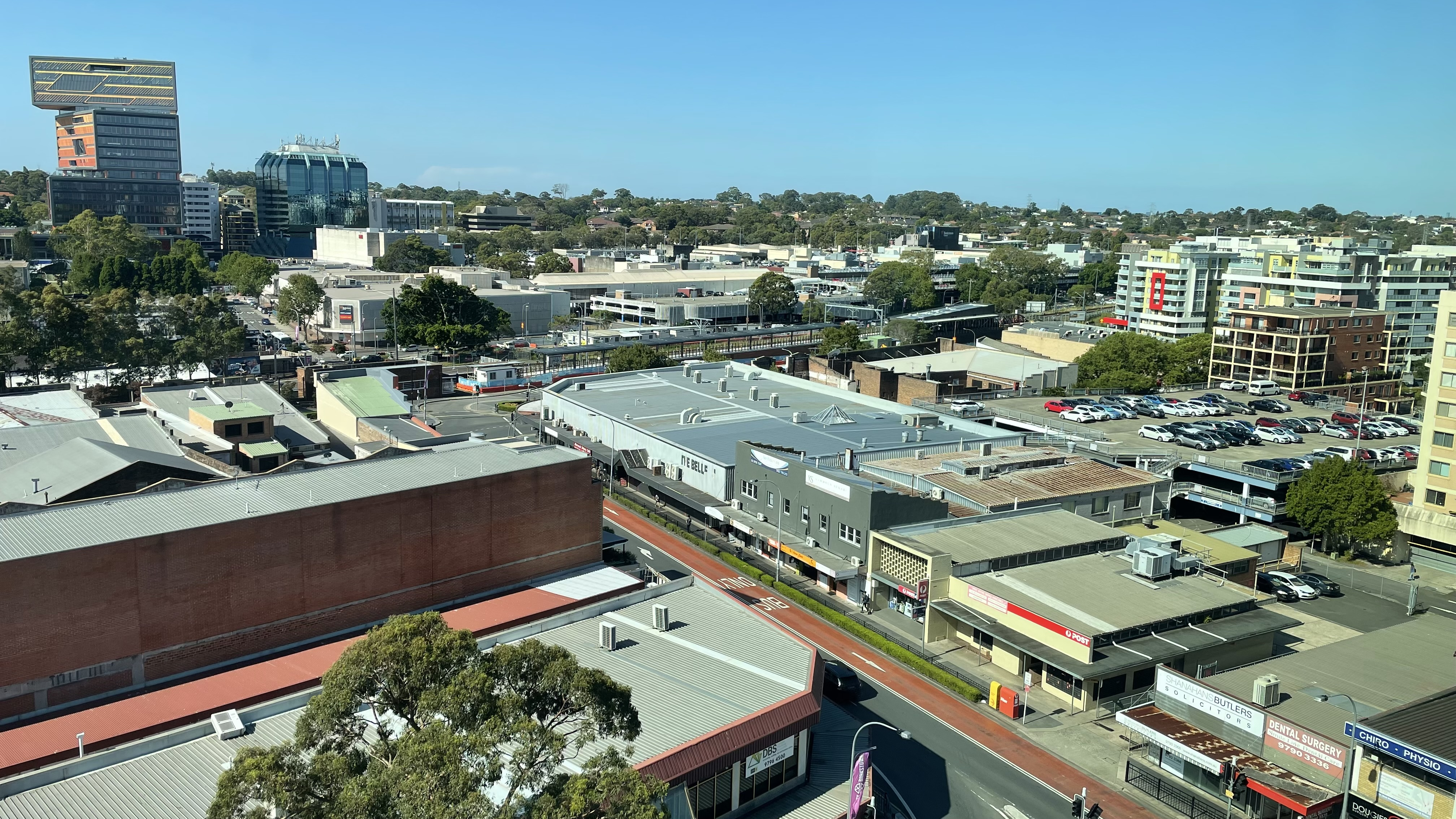
View of Bankstown CBD.

The City of Canterbury-Bankstown is home to the second highest number of registered businesses in NSW. In 2021–22, the City of Canterbury-Bankstown had an estimated Gross Regional Product (GRP) of $16.7 billion, making it the eight largest economy in the state.

Multinational companies including Volkswagen have based their Australian operations in Canterbury-Bankstown. The City of Canterbury-Bankstown is home to the largest postal distribution centre in the Southern Hemisphere, which is operated by the Australia Post. Bankstown Airport is a major employment area for aviation and logistics. The NSW Police Force, NSW Ambulance, NSW National Parks & Wildlife Service and the Royal Flying Doctor Service have their flight operations at Bankstown Airport.

== Demographics ==
Selected historical census data for Canterbury-Bankstown local government area
Census year		2016	2021
Population	Population on census night	346,302	▲371,006
Population	LGA rank in terms of size within New South Wales	1st	▼2nd
Population	% of New South Wales population	4.63%	▼4.59%
Population	% of Australian population	1.48%	▼1.46%
Median weekly incomes			
Personal income	Median weekly personal income	A$502	▲ A$625
Personal income	% of Australian median income	75.8%	▲77.6%
Family income	Median weekly family income	A$1,437	▲ A$1,786
Family income	% of Australian median income	82.9%	▲84.2%
Household income	Median weekly household income	A$1,298	▲ A$1,556
Household income	% of Australian median income	90.3%	▼89.1%
Dwelling structure			
Dwelling type	Separate house	57.1%	▼55.0%
Dwelling type	Semi-detached, terrace or townhouse	16.1%	▼15.7%
Dwelling type	Flat or apartment	25.9%	▲28.5%

Selected historical census data for Canterbury-Bankstown local government area
Ancestry, top responses
2016		2021	
Lebanese	12.5%	Lebanese	▲14.1%
Australian	11.8%	Australian	▲13.9%
English	10.2%	Chinese	▲11.6%
Chinese	9.4%	English	▲11.3%
Vietnamese	6.0%	Vietnamese	▲7.3%
Country of birth, top responses
2016		2021	
Australia	49.6%	Australia	▼49.2%
Lebanon	5.7%	Vietnam	▲5.9%
Vietnam	5.5%	Lebanon	▲5.8%
China	5.4%	China	▼5.3%
Bangladesh	2.0%	Bangladesh	2.0%
Greece	2.0%	Greece	▼1.9%
Language, top responses (other than English)
2016		2021	
Arabic	17.2%	Arabic	17.2%
Vietnamese	7.2%	Vietnamese	▲7.5%
Greek	5.4%	Mandarin	▲5.1%
Mandarin	5.0%	Greek	▼4.7%
Cantonese	3.9%	Cantonese	▼3.7%
Religious affiliation, top responses
2016		2021	
Catholic	23.4%	Islam	▲23.6%
Islam	20.8%	Catholic	▼21.5%
No Religion	15.0%	No Religion	▲17.5%
Eastern Orthodox	8.9%	Eastern Orthodox	▼8.5%
Not stated	8.6%	Not stated	▼8.0%

=== Residents ===
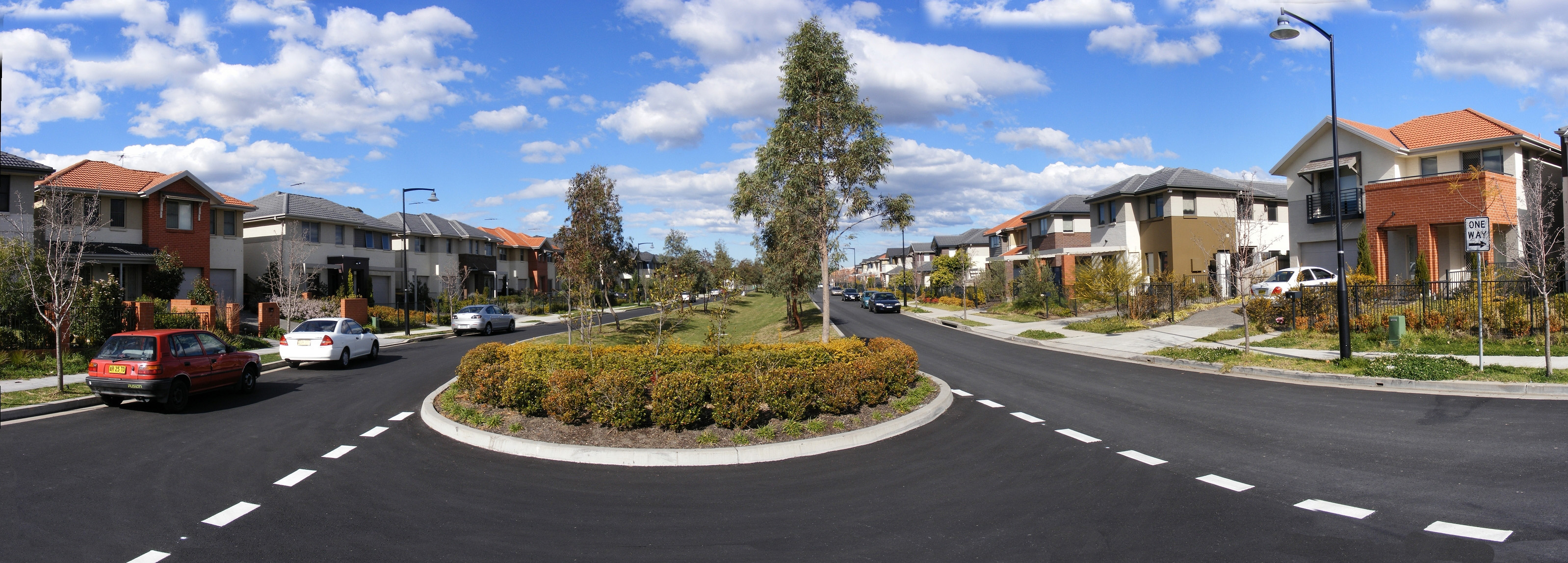
Residential housing in Punchbowl

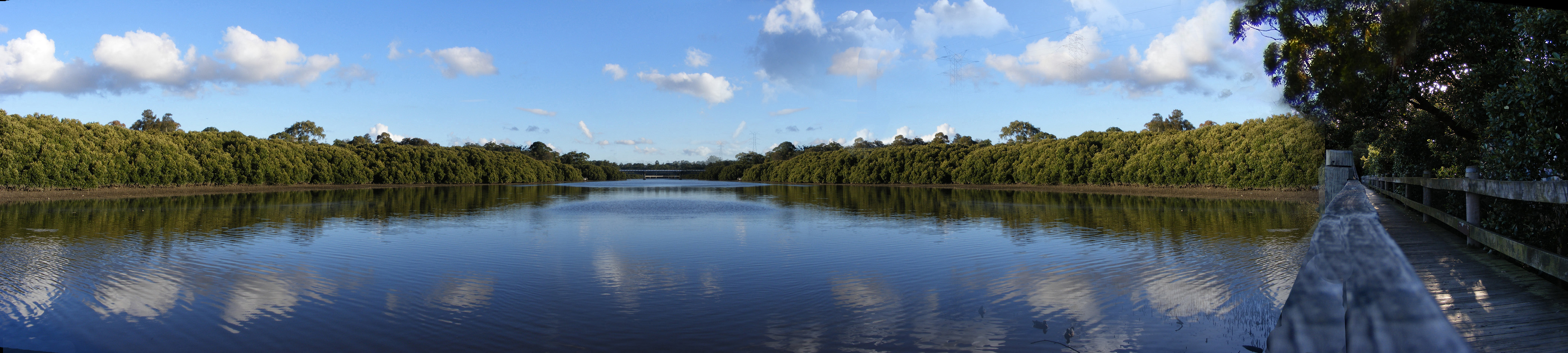
Large natural parklands in the south of the region, around Salt Pan Creek

The Canterbury-Bankstown region is characterised by high-density housing towards the east and larger family homes towards the west with large natural parklands toward the south, such as those around Salt Pan Creek. Suburbs within the region have a multicultural nature.

Like Sydney's inner west, Canterbury-Bankstown is multi-cultural. There is a significant Chinese, Indian, Korean, Fijian, Vietnamese, Lebanese, Greek, Italian, Yugoslav and African population. This is also reflected in the variety and style of many local businesses and cultural institutions.

Notable former residents include the former Prime Minister John Howard and Paul Keating and Olympian Ian Thorpe.

The Australian Bureau of Statistics defines two statistical areas (SAL3) called "Canterbury" and "Bankstown" respectively, which together largely correlate with the customary definitions of the Canterbury–Bankstown region. Based on the 2021 Australian census:

- SAL3 "Canterbury" had a population of 141,091, with a median age of 36. 25.3% of people had a highest educational qualification of bachelor or above, compared to 27.8% across the state. The largest population groups by ancestry were Chinese (13.6%), Lebanese (11.8%), Australian (11.0%), Greek (9.6%) and English (8.9%). 44.2% of people were born in Australia, and the next most popular places of birth were China (7.0%), Lebanon (4.9%), Bangladesh (3.7%), Vietnam (3.3%) and Greece (3.3%). The most popular responses for religion were Islam (22.6%), Catholic (21.0%), no religion (17.8%), Eastern Orthodox (11.7%) and not stated (8.1%). 29.1% of people spoke only English at home, and the next popular responses for languages used at home were Arabic (13.2%), Greek (7.8%), Mandarin (6.8%), Bengali (4.7%) and Cantonese (4.2%).
- SAL3 "Bankstown" had a population of 186,245, with a median age of 36. 21.7% of people had a highest educational qualification of bachelor or above, compared to 27.8% across the state. The largest population groups by ancestry were Lebanese (16.8%), Australian (16.0%), English (12.8%), Vietnamese (9.7%) and Chinese (8.6%). 53.4% of people were born in Australia, and the next most popular places of birth were Vietnam (7.7%), Lebanon (6.7%), China (3.3%), Pakistan (1.3%) and India (1.3%). The most popular responses for religion were Islam (25.6%), Catholic (22.2%), no religion (15.3%), not stated (7.7%) and Eastern Orthodox (6.9%). 36.7% of people spoke only English at home, and the next popular responses for languages used at home were Arabic (21.2%), Vietnamese (10.1%), Mandarin (3.3%), Greek (2.8%) and Cantonese (2.7%).

== Council ==
City of Canterbury Bankstown Council

Leadership
- Mayor: Bilal El-Hayek (Labor)
- Deputy Mayor: Karl Saleh (Labor)

Structure
- Seats: 15 councillors
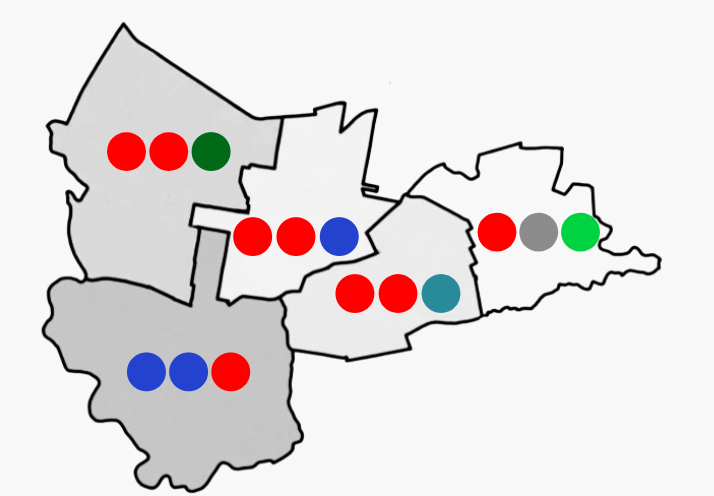
- Map of elected councillors by party in each of the 5 wards
- Political groups: Majority (8): Labor (8); Others (7): Liberal (3); Greens (1); Community Voice (1); Our Local Community (1); Independent (1)

Elections
- Voting system: Single transferable vote
- Last election: 14 September 2024
- Next election: 16 September 2028

The Council comprises fifteen Councillors elected proportionally, with three Councillors elected in five wards. On 9 September 2017 the current Council was elected for a fixed term of office. Although the fixed term of the council is typically four years, due to delays caused by amalgamations and the COVID-19 pandemic, the first term from 9 September 2017 expired on 4 December 2021. The Mayor and Deputy Mayor are elected by the Councillors for two-year and one-year terms, respectively. The City of Canterbury Bankstown was under the management of Administrator Richard Colley and Interim General Manager Matthew Stewart until elections were held on 9 September 2017 and the first meeting of the elected Council on 26 September 2017.

=== Current composition ===
The most recent election was held on 14 September 2024, the makeup of the council, by order of election, is as follows:

Ward	Councillor	Party	Notes
Bankstown Ward	George Zakhia	Liberal	Elected 2017
Bankstown Ward	Khal Asfour	Labor	Elected 2017; Mayor 2017–2023
Bankstown Ward	Bilal El-Hayek	Labor	Elected 2017; Deputy Mayor 2019–2020, 2021–2022; Mayor 2023–present
Bass Hill Ward	Rachelle Harika	Labor	Elected 2017; Deputy Mayor 2020–2021, 2023–2024, 2025-present
Bass Hill Ward	Christopher Cahill	Labor	
Bass Hill Ward	Saud Abu-Samen	Community Voice	Elected 2024
Canterbury Ward	Clare Raffan	Labor	Elected 2017; Deputy Mayor 2018–2019, 2022–2023
Canterbury Ward	Barbara Coorey	Independent	Canterbury West Ward Councillor 1991–1999; Canterbury Deputy Mayor 1995–1996
Canterbury Ward	Conroy Blood	Greens	Elected 2024
Revesby Ward	Wendy Lindsay	Liberal	Elected 2024; State member for East Hills 2019–2023
Revesby Ward	Jennifer Walther	Liberal	Elected 2024
Revesby Ward	David Walsh	Labor	
Roselands Ward	Harry Stavrinos	Our Local Community	Elected 2024
Roselands Ward	Karl Saleh OAM	Labor	Canterbury West Ward Councillor 2004–2016; Deputy Mayor 2008–2009, 2012–2013, 2015–2016; 2024–2025
Roselands Ward	Sherin Akther	Labor	Elected 2024

=== Officeholders ===
Mayor	Term	Notes
Richard Colley (Administrator)	12 May 2016 – 26 September 2017	General Manager of Bankstown 2000–2007 and Administrator of Wollongong 2010–2011
Khal Asfour	26 September 2017 – 11 May 2023	Mayor of Bankstown 2011–2014, 2015–2016
Bilal El-Hayek	11 May 2023 – present	
Deputy Mayor	Term	Notes
Nadia Saleh	26 September 2017 – 25 September 2018	
Clare Raffan	25 September 2018 – 19 September 2019	
Bilal El-Hayek	19 September 2019 – 28 September 2020	
Rachelle Harika	28 September 2020 – 29 September 2021	
Linda Downey	29 September 2021 – 24 December 2021	Mayor of Bankstown 2014–2015
Bilal El-Hayek	24 December 2021 – 29 September 2022	
Clare Raffan	29 September 2022 – 11 September 2023	
Rachelle Harika	11 September 2023 – 15 October 2024	
Karl Saleh	15 October 2024 – 19 September 2025	
Rachelle Harika	19 September 2025 - present	
General Manager	Term	Notes
Matthew Stewart	12 May 2016 – present	General Manager of Bankstown 2010–2016

== Election results ==
=== 2024 ===
2024 Canterbury Bankstown Council election: Ward results
Party	Votes	%	Swing	Seats	Change
Labor	72,278	41.3	−6.1	8	▼1
Liberal	30,096	17.2	−12.8	3	▼2
Independents	19,042	10.9	−2.3	1	Steady
Greens	17,350	9.9	+6.2	1	▲1
Libertarian	15,904	9.1	+9.1	0	Steady
Community Voice	10,093	5.8	+5.8	1	▲1
Our Local Community	6,308	3.6	+3.6	1	▲1
Animal Justice	1,601	0.9	−0.7	0	Steady
Unity	1,556	0.9	+0.9	0	Steady
Democrats	967	0.6	+0.6	0	Steady
Formal votes	175,195	89.9			
Informal votes	19,577	10.1			
Total	194,772	100.0		15	
Registered voters / turnout	236,472	82.3			

=== 2021 ===
2021 New South Wales local elections: Canterbury-Bankstown
Party	Votes	%	Swing	Seats	Change
Labor	83,724	47.4	+0.0	9	Steady
Liberal	52,960	30.0	+0.6	5	Steady
Greens	6,608	3.7	−4.8	0	▼1
Independent	16,221	9.1	+4.6	0	Steady
Barbara Coorey Independent Group	9,027	5.1	+5.1	1	▲1
Our Local Community	5,105	2.9	−7.2	0	Steady
Animal Justice	2,746	8.2	+8.2	0	Steady
Communist League	99	0.1		0	Steady
Formal votes	176,490				

== Commercial areas ==
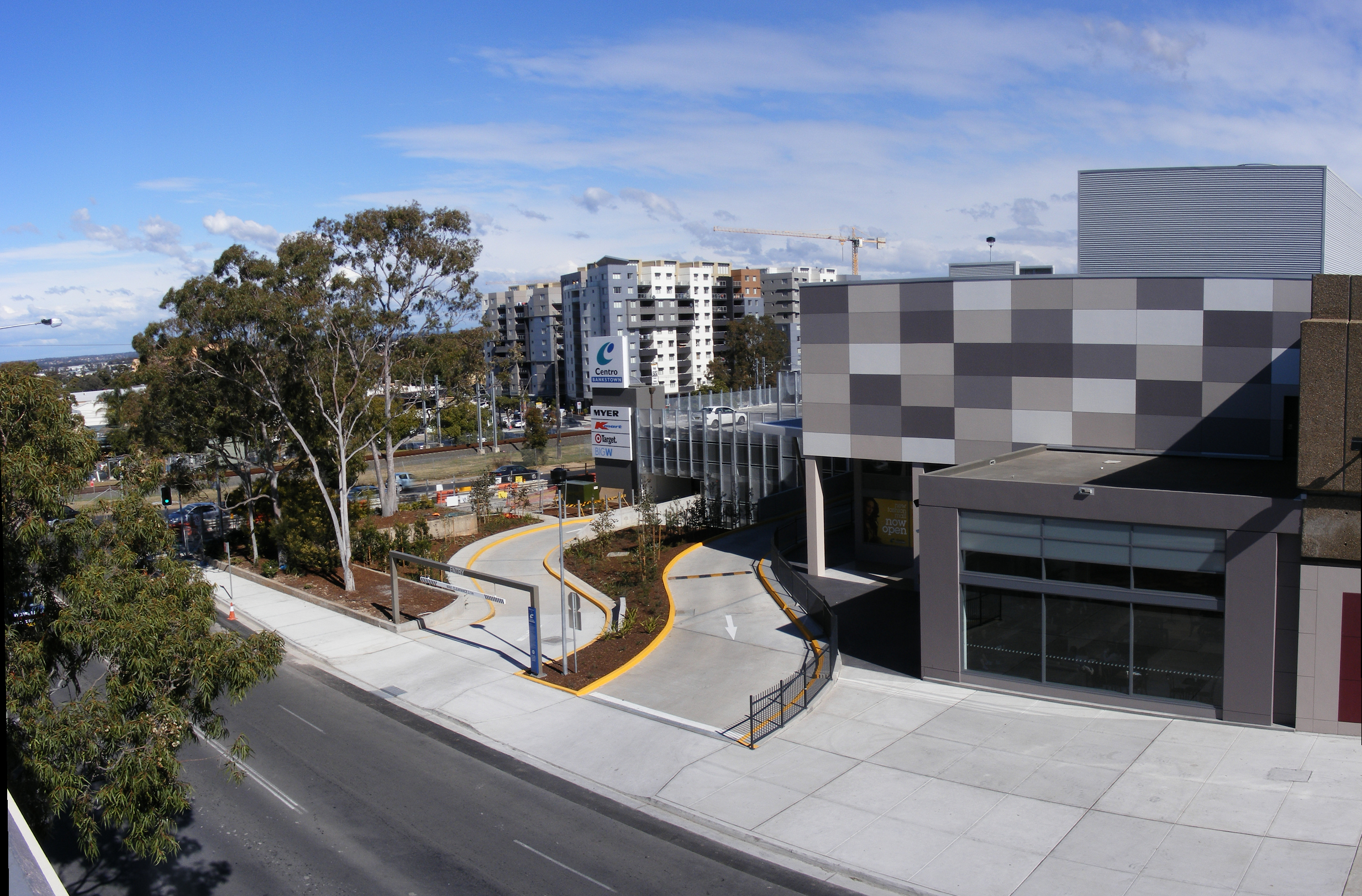
Bankstown Central is the largest shopping centre in Canterbury-Bankstown

The biggest commercial areas in the Canterbury-Bankstown area are located at Bankstown, Campsie and Roselands. Bankstown is the largest central business district in the region and features the Bankstown Central shopping centre. Roselands also features a large shopping centre, HomeCo. Roselands. The Canterbury–Bankstown region also has a variety of Vietnamese, Lebanese, Greek, Italian, Spanish, African and Australian restaurants, delicatessens, sweet shops, grocery and fresh food markets.

== Transport ==
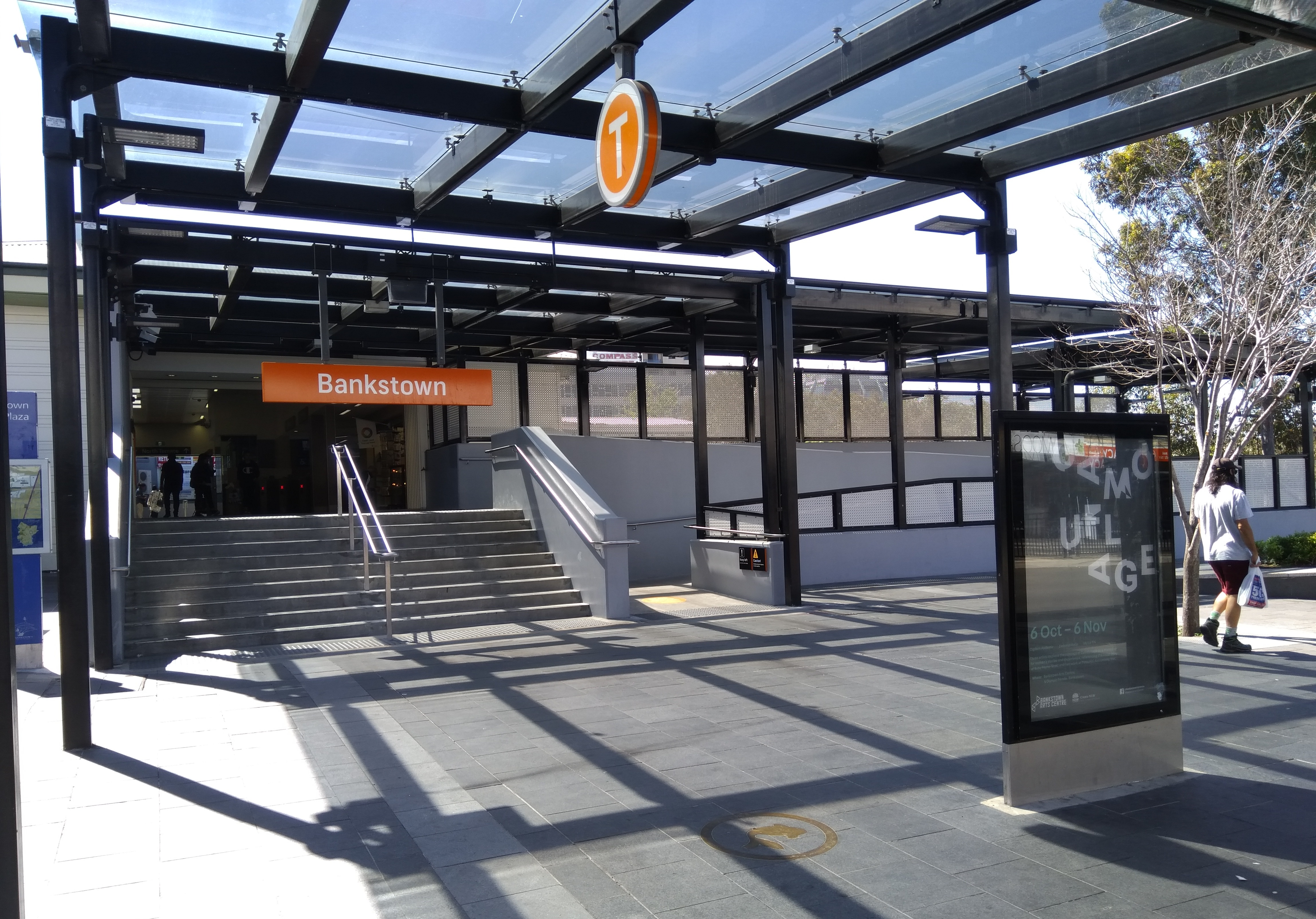
Bankstown railway station

Canterbury, Liverpool and Punchbowl Roads are the main roads through the area. The M5 Motorway runs through the Bankstown area and close to the southern boundary of the Canterbury area, and provides a motorway connection from this region east to Sydney Airport and west to Liverpool and beyond and (via the M8 Motorway and WestConnex) the Inner West region and beyond.

Public transport in the region includes trains and buses. The Lidcombe & Bankstown Line runs from Bankstown to Lidcombe. Currently the Bankstown line is closed between Sydenham and Bankstown stations, as it is being converted to Metro North West & Bankstown Line which will open in 2026.

The Airport & South Line runs from the City Circle and passes through the southern part of Canterbury-Bankstown, with all stations services that terminate at Revesby and limited stops services which continue onto Macarthur. This line also provides a direct connection from the region to Sydney Airport. There are various bus routes provided largely by the privately owned companies Transit Systems and U-Go Mobility.

== Education ==
The Canterbury-Bankstown region is home to the Bankstown Campus of Western Sydney University.

Public high schools in the area include Bankstown Senior College, Bankstown Girls High School, Wiley Park Girls High School, Belmore Boys High School, Birrong Girls High School, Birrong Boys High School, Canterbury Boys High School and Punchbowl Boys High School.

Belmore Boys High School has elite football and rugby league programs in conjunction with the Bulldogs to create equitable opportunities for those seeking to develop in the sport. Bulldogs player Hazem El Masri attended Belmore Boys High School.

Teachers and principals in the area have become influential in the NSW educational space, including Department of Education Secretary Murat Dizdar, who was a head teacher at Belmore Boys High School before becoming deputy principal at Punchbowl Boys High School. Local politician, Jihad Dib was a former principal of Punchbowl Boys High School.

== Health ==
The former City of Canterbury is served by the Sydney Local Health District of NSW Health, which also covers the Inner West region. Canterbury Hospital, a historic public hospital operated by the Sydney Local Health District is in the region. The former City of Bankstown is served by the South Western Sydney Health District of NSW Health, which also covers an expansive area to the south and west of Sydney as far south as the Southern Highlands.

== Heritage listings ==
The City of Canterbury Bankstown has a number of heritage-listed sites, including:

- Ashbury, Holden Street: Ashfield Reservoir
- Belmore, Burwood Road: Belmore railway station
- Canterbury, Bankstown railway: Canterbury railway station, Sydney
- Canterbury, 9 Fore Street: Bethungra, Canterbury
- Canterbury, Sugar House Road: Old Sugarmill
- Condell Park, Corner of Marion and Edgar Street: Bankstown Bunker
- Earlwood, Pine Street: Cooks River Sewage Aqueduct
- Earlwood, Unwin Street: Wolli Creek Aqueduct

== Notable organisations ==
- Canterbury-Bankstown Bulldogs
- Sydney Olympic Football Club
- Canterbury-Bankstown Express, local newspaper

== Sister cities ==
The City of Canterbury Bankstown has 7 sister cities.

- Broken Hill, Australia
- Cobar Shire, Australia
- Suita, Japan
- Yangcheon District, Seoul, South Korea
- Eunpyeong District, Seoul, South Korea
- Tianhe District, Guangzhou, China
- Colorado Springs, United States

== See also ==
- Local government areas of New South Wales
