= 2024 Canterbury Bankstown Council election =

- 14 September 2024

All 15 seats on Canterbury Bankstown Council 8 seats needed for a majority
- Registered: 236,472
- Turnout: 82.3%

	First party	Second party	Third party
Party	Labor	Liberal	Greens
Last election	9 seats	5 seats	0 seats
Seats before	9	4	0
Seats won	8	3	1
Seat change	▼1	▼1	▲1
Primary vote	72,278	30,096	17,350
Percentage	41.3%	17.2%	9.9%
Swing	▲18.04	▲12.8	▲6.2
	Fourth party	Fifth party	Sixth party
			OLC
Party	Libertarian	Community Voice	OLC
Last election	Did not contest	Did not exist	Did not contest
Seats before	0	0	0
Seats won	1	1	0
Seat change	▲1	▲1	Steady
Primary vote	15,904	10,093	6,308
Percentage	9.1%	5.8%	3.6%
Swing	▲9.1	▲5.8	▲3.6

The 2024 Canterbury Bankstown Council election was held on 14 September 2024 to elect 15 councillors to the City of Canterbury Bankstown. The election was held as part of the statewide local government elections in New South Wales.

The Labor Party narrowly retained its majority, winning eight seats. The Liberal Party won three seats but lost 12.8% of its council-wide vote, owing to a missed candidate nomination deadline which prevented some of its councillors from recontesting.

== Background ==
Canterbury Ward councillor Jessie Nguyen was expelled from the Liberal Party in December 2022.

== Electoral system ==
Like in all other New South Wales local government areas (LGAs), Canterbury Bankstown Council elections use optional preferential voting. Under this system, voters are only required to vote for one candidate or group, although they can choose to preference other candidates.

All elections for councillor positions are elected using proportional representation. Canterbury Bankstown has an Australian Senate-style ballot paper with above-the-line and below-the-line voting. The council is divided into five wards, each electing three councillors.

The election was conducted by the New South Wales Electoral Commission (NSWEC).

== Retiring councillors ==
=== Labor ===
- Linda Downey (Revesby)
- Bhadra Waiba (Roselands)

=== Independents ===
- Jessie Nguyen (Canterbury)

== Candidates ==
On 14 August 2024, the day that candidates nominations closed, the Liberal Party revealed they had missed the deadline to nominate 164 candidates in 16 different LGAs. This included all Liberal candidates in Bass Hill Ward and Canterbury Ward.

Labor and the Libertarian Party contested all five wards.

This was the only council contested by the Australian Democrats in 2024.

=== Bankstown ===
Libertarian (Group A)	Liberal (Group B)	Independent (Group C)
1. Vanessa Hadchiti; 2. Roy El Kazzi; 3. Kristofer Seremetkoski	1. George Zakhia; 2. Long Phan; 3. Selina Akhter	1. Mahmoud Hussein; 2. Yasmeen Shadid; 3. Michel Antonios Tawk
Community Voice (Group D)	Greens (Group E)	Labor (Group F)
1. Amer El-Adib; 2. Mohammad Kabir; 3. Yousef Abu-Samen	1. Abrar Ahmad; 2. Nahed Fraitekh; 3. John Ky	1. Bilal El-Hayek; 2. Khal Asfour; 3. Erika Lam

=== Bass Hill ===
Labor (Group A)	Community Voice (Group B)	Libertarian (Group C)	Independent (Group D)
1. Rachelle Harika; 2. Christopher Cahill; 3. Ayman Awad	1. Saud Abu-Samen; 2. Allan Winterbottom; 3. Huzaifa Khan	1. Elvis Sinosic; 2. John Hadchiti; 3. Wissam Ibrahim	1. Talal Saifo; 2. Nabil Omari; 3. Doha-Donna Elomari

=== Canterbury ===
Independent (Group A)	Unity (Group B)	Labor (Group C)	Independent (Group D)
1. Christine Barakat; 2. Waroud Dargham; 3. George Daibes	1. Carol Xie; 2. Chuan-Hui Huang; 3. Bei Zhong	1. Clare Raffan; 2. Con Vaitsas; 3. Louis Pan	1. Barbara Coorey; 2. Aliki Xanthakos; 3. Stephen Haran
Libertarian (Group E)	Greens (Group F)	Ungrouped	
1. Joshua Moore; 2. Julie Morkos Douaihy	1. Conroy Blood; 2. Linda Eisler; 3. Bradley Schott	Martin Vella (Ind)	

=== Revesby ===
Greens (Group A)	Community Voice (Group B)	Labor (Group C)	Libertarian (Group D)
1. Natalie Hanna; 2. Kath Jordan; 3. Ned Cutcher	1. Alwalid Al-Miziab; 2. Hicham Arabi; 3. Rizwan Arif	1. David Walsh; 2. Gemma Ashton; 3. Oliver Pocock	1. Marika Momircevski; 2. George Trousas; 3. Mario Azar
Liberal (Group E)	Democrats (Group F)	Ungrouped	
1. Wendy Lindsay; 2. Jennifer Walther; 3. Richard Noonan	1. Phillip Pearce; 2. Phan Nguyen; 3. Garry Dalrymple	Marlene Marquez-Obeid (Ind)	

=== Roselands ===
Our Local Community (Group A)	Labor (Group B)	Community Voice (Group C)	Independent (Group D)	Animal Justice (Group E)	Independent (Group F)
1. Harry Stavrinos; 2. Raymond Moujalli; 3. Maria Difrancesco	1. Khodr Saleh; 2. Sherin Akther; 3. Hady Saleh	1. Solaiman Hossain; 2. Faizun Pally; 3. Sameer Mahmud	1. Ali Shikder; 2. Rachael Pickering	1. Dorlene Abou-Haidar; 2. Louise Ward; 3. Brad Stafford	1. Rana Sharif; 2. Taher Shaikh Mohammed; 3. Elsadig Mohammed
Greens (Group G)	Libertarian (Group H)	Independent (Group I)	Liberal (Group J)	Ungrouped	
1. Anisha Gautam; 2. Shilpa Rajkumar; 3. Zoe McClure	1. Mark Smaling; 2. Carmel Nicholls; 3. Raymond O'Reilly	1. Mohammad Mahbub Rahman; 2. Maria Mostain; 3. Fahmida Khandakur; 4. Rakibul Alam	1. Mohammad Zaman; 2. Sazeda Akter	Imad Kadeh (Ind)	

=== Withdrawn candidates ===
Party	Candidate	Ward	Details
Liberal	Charlie Ishac	Bass Hill	Incumbent councillor unable to recontest because of missed candidacy deadline.
Liberal	Charbel Abouraad	Revesby	Incumbent councillor unable to recontest because of missed candidacy deadline.

== Results ==
=== Ward results ===
2024 Canterbury Bankstown Council election: Ward results
Party	Votes	%	Swing	Seats	Change
Labor	72,278	41.3	−6.1	8	▼1
Liberal	30,096	17.2	−12.8	3	▼2
Independents	19,042	10.9	−2.3	1	Steady
Greens	17,350	9.9	+6.2	1	▲1
Libertarian	15,904	9.1	+9.1	0	Steady
Community Voice	10,093	5.8	+5.8	1	▲1
Our Local Community	6,308	3.6	+3.6	1	▲1
Animal Justice	1,601	0.9	−0.7	0	Steady
Unity	1,556	0.9	+0.9	0	Steady
Democrats	967	0.6	+0.6	0	Steady
Formal votes	175,195	89.9			
Informal votes	19,577	10.1			
Total	194,772	100.0		15	
Registered voters / turnout	236,472	82.3			

=== Bankstown ===
2024 Canterbury Bankstown Council election: Bankstown Ward
Party	Candidate	Votes	%	±%
Labor	1. Bilal El-Hayek (elected 1); 2. Khal Asfour (elected 3); 3. Erika Lam	15,511	45.2	−13.1
Liberal	1. George Zakhia (elected 2); 2. Long Phan; 3. Selina Akhter	10,203	29.8	−0.8
Libertarian	1. Vanessa Hadchiti; 2. Roy El Kazzi; 3. Kristofer Seremetkoski	3,579	10.4	+10.4
Greens	1. Abrar Ahmad; 2. Nahed Fraitekh; 3. John Ky	3,050	8.9	+8.9
Community Voice	1. Amer El-Adib; 2. Mohammad Kabir; 3. Yousef Abu-Samen	1,254	3.7	+3.7
Independent	1. Mahmoud Hussein; 2. Yasmeen Shadid; 3. Michel Antonios Tawk	695	2.0	+2.0
Total formal votes		34,292	89.6	−3.9
Informal votes		3,995	10.4	+3.9
Turnout		38,287	79.7	−1.2

=== Bass Hill ===
2024 Canterbury Bankstown Council election: Bass Hill Ward
Party	Candidate	Votes	%	±%
Labor	1. Rachelle Harika (elected 1); 2. Christopher Cahill (elected 2); 3. Ayman Awad	17,930	55.0	+3.1
Community Voice	1. Saud Abu-Samen (elected 3); 2. Allan Winterbottom; 3. Huzaifa Khan	6,113	18.8	+0.8
Libertarian	1. Elvis Sinosic; 2. John Hadchiti; 3. Wissam Ibrahim	5,985	18.4	+18.4
Independent	1. Talal Saifo; 2. Nabil Omari; 3. Doha-Donna Elomari	2,566	7.9	+7.9
Total formal votes		32,594	88.2	−4.7
Informal votes		4,374	11.8	+4.7
Turnout		36,968	79.8	−0.5

=== Canterbury ===
2024 Canterbury Bankstown Council election: Canterbury Ward
Party	Candidate	Votes	%	±%
Labor	1. Clare Raffan (elected 1); 2. Con Vaitsas; 3. Louis Pan	14,416	39.3	+5.2
Independent	1. Barbara Coorey (elected 2); 2. Aliki Xanthakos; 3. Stephen Haran	9,850	26.8	+2.6
Greens	1. Conroy Blood (elected 3); 2. Linda Eisler; 3. Bradley Schott	6,379	17.4	−0.3
Independent	1. Christine Barakat; 2. Waroud Dargham; 3. George Daibes	2,752	7.5	+7.5
Unity	1. Carol Xie; 2. Chuan-Hui Huang; 3. Bei Zhong	1,557	4.2	+4.2
Libertarian	1. Joshua Moore; 2. Julie Morkos Douaihy	1,347	3.7	+3.7
Independent	Martin Vella	423	1.2	+1.2
Total formal votes		36,724	91.3	−2.9
Informal votes		3,479	8.7	+2.9
Turnout		40,203	84.8	−0.3

=== Revesby ===
2024 Canterbury Bankstown Council election: Revesby Ward
Party	Candidate	Votes	%	±%
Liberal	1. Wendy Lindsay (elected 1); 2. Jennifer Walther (elected 3); 3. Richard Noonan	17,610	45.0	+8.5
Labor	1. David Walsh (elected 2); 2. Gemma Ashton; 3. Oliver Pocock	12,515	32.0	−9.9
Greens	1. Natalie Hanna; 2. Kath Jordan; 3. Ned Cutcher	4,665	11.9	+11.9
Libertarian	1. Marika Momircevski; 2. George Trousas; 3. Mario Azar	1,895	4.8	+4.8
Community Voice	1. Alwalid Al-Miziab; 2. Hicham Arabi; 3. Rizwan Arif	1,329	3.4	+3.4
Democrats	1. Phillip Pearce; 2. Phan Nguyen; 3. Garry Dalrymple	967	2.5	+2.5
Independent	Marlene Marquez-Obeid	140	0.4	+0.4
Total formal votes		39,121	93.3	−1.6
Informal votes		2,812	6.7	+1.6
Turnout		41,933	85.9	−0.4

=== Roselands ===
2024 Canterbury Bankstown Council election: Roselands Ward
Party	Candidate	Votes	%	±%
Labor	1. Khodr Saleh (elected 1); 2. Sherin Akther (elected 3); 3. Hady Saleh	11,906	36.7	−16.5
Our Local Community	1. Harry Stavrinos (elected 2); 2. Raymond Moujalli; 3. Maria Difrancesco	6,308	19.4	+19.4
Greens	1. Anisha Gautam; 2. Shilpa Rajkumar; 3. Zoe McClure	3,256	10.0	+10.0
Libertarian	1. Mark Smaling; 2. Carmel Nicholls; 3. Raymond O'Reilly	3,098	9.5	+9.5
Liberal	1. Mohammad Zaman; 2. Sazeda Akter	2,283	7.0	−21.9
Animal Justice	1. Dorlene Abou-Haidar; 2. Louise Ward; 3. Brad Stafford	1,601	4.9	−3.3
Community Voice	1. Solaiman Hossain; 2. Faizun Pally; 3. Sameer Mahmud	1,397	4.3	+4.3
Independent	1. Rana Sharif; 2. Taher Shaikh Mohammed; 3. Elsadig Mohammed	1,377	4.2	+4.2
Independent	1. Ali Shikder; 2. Rachael Pickering	626	1.9	+1.9
Independent	1. Mohammad Mahbub Rahman; 2. Maria Mostain; 3. Fahmida Khandakur; 4. Rakibul Alam	596	1.8	+1.8
Independent	Imad Kadeh	17	0.1	+0.1
Total formal votes		32,465	86.8	−5.7
Informal votes		4,917	13.2	+5.7
Turnout		37,382	81.6	+0.9
