= Beverly Hills railway station =

Railway station in Sydney, New South Wales, Australia

Beverly Hills
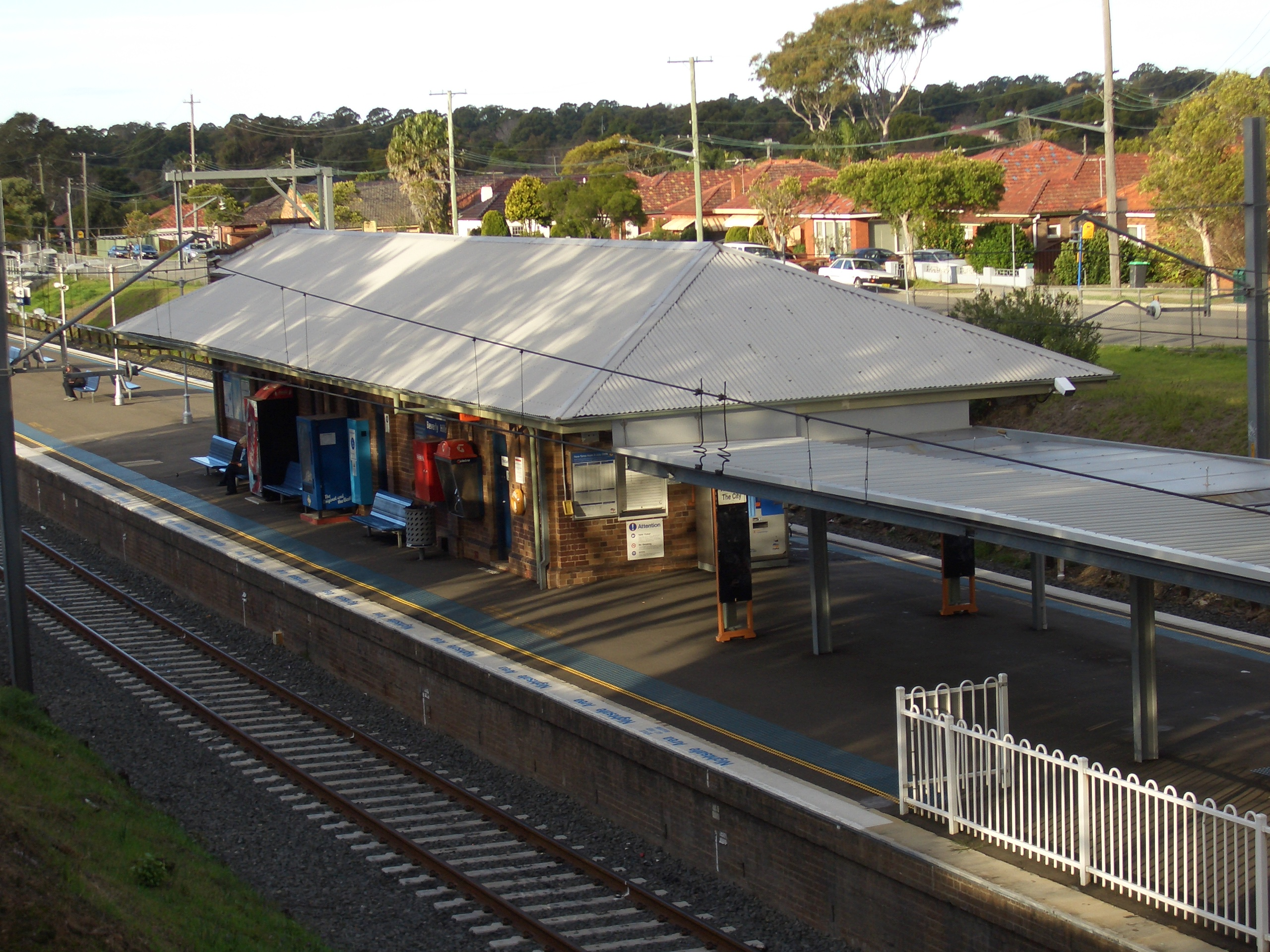
- The station in July 2006, prior to track quadruplication

General information
- Location: King Georges Road, Beverly Hills; Sydney, New South Wales; Australia
- Coordinates: 33°56′56″S 151°04′53″E
- Owner: Transport Asset Manager of NSW
- Operator: Sydney Trains
- Line: East Hills
- Distance: 14.65 km (9.10 mi) from Central
- Platforms: 2 (1 island)
- Tracks: 4
- Connections: Bus

Construction
- Structure type: Ground
- Accessible: Yes

Other information
- Status: Weekdays: Staffed: 6am to 7pm: Weekends and public holidays: Staffed: 8am to 4pm
- Station code: BVH
- Website: Transport for NSW

History
- Opened: 21 December 1931 (94 years ago)
- Former names: Dumbleton (1931–1940)

Passengers
- 2025: 1,028,566 (year); 2,818 (daily) (Sydney Trains, NSW TrainLink)
- Rank: 124

Services
Preceding station	Sydney Trains	Following station
Narwee towards Revesby or Macarthur	T8 Airport & South Line	Kingsgrove towards City Circle

New South Wales Heritage Register
- Official name: Beverly Hills Railway Station group; Dumbleton Railway Station (until 1940)
- Type: State heritage (complex / group)
- Designated: 2 April 1999
- Reference no.: 1086
- Type: Railway Platform / Station
- Category: Transport – Rail
- Builders: NSW Government Railways
Location

Beverly Hills railway station is a heritage-listed suburban railway station located on the East Hills line, serving the Sydney suburb of Beverly Hills. The station is served by Sydney Trains T8 Airport & South Line services. The station was designed and built by the NSW Government Railways. It was originally known as Dumbleton Railway Station. The property was added to the New South Wales State Heritage Register on 2 April 1999 as part of the Beverly Hills Railway Station group structures.

Beverly Hills is the only station on the East Hills line with asymmetrical platforms, as Platform 1 is curved but Platform 2 is straight. It was one of the last stations in Sydney to use Edmondson-style paper tickets.

== History ==
The first European settlement in the area was the establishment of a farm known as "Dumbleton" in the 1830s. The area south of the railway line was part of John Townson's 100-hectare (250-acre) grant of 1810. The area remained semi-rural until the construction of the East Hills line and the railway station. The main impetus for the construction of the East Hills line was from the real estate industry, which wanted to develop the area where the line was proposed. However construction of the line was delayed, and it became an unemployment relief project during the course of its construction due to the onset of the Great Depression.

The Public Works Committee recommended the line to State Parliament in August, 1924, expecting a small operating profit and opening up good building land. The debate on the Bill to construct the line took only 15 minutes after it was introduced at 5.12am on 17 December 1924, and the Governors assent given on 23 December, but no funds were provided. Just before the 1927 state elections, the Premier of New South Wales, Jack Lang, turned the first sod at Padstow on 3 September 1927. Though he subsequently lost the election, the new non-labour government in April 1928, instructed the Railways Commissioners to commence work on the line.

Jack Lang was Premier for two periods: the first from June 1925 to October 1927, the second period (during the Depression) from October 1930 to May 1932. Lang was therefore again Premier when he officially opened the East Hills line at Padstow Railway Station in 1931, with the section as far as Kingsgrove being a double track electrified line.

All platform buildings on the East Hills line were built to the same general design and plan, which was revised after initial planning to include a booking office, Station Master's office and parcels office. The platform at Beverly Hills is unique on the line by having the "down" side straight and the "up" side curved. Beverly Hills station opened on 21 December 1931 as Dumbleton when the line was extended from Kingsgrove to East Hills.

The line was electrified from Kingsgrove in 1939 and duplicated in 1948. The suburb of Dumbleton was renamed Beverly Hills in 1940, and the railway station adopted the new name from 24 August that same year.

In 2002 a lift to the platform was built along with steel awning that covered the stairs and extended to the building from street level. The station has the distinction of being one of the last in Sydney to sell "Edmondson" card type tickets.

Construction work was underway in 2009 to upgrade the East Hills line generally following quadruplification of the line. In 2013, as part of the quadruplication of the line from Kingsgrove to Revesby, through lines were added on either side of the existing pair.

== Services ==
=== Platforms ===
Platform	Line	Stopping pattern	Notes
1	T8 Airport & South Line	services to Central & the City Circle via the Airport	
2	T8 Airport & South Line	services to Revesby early morning & late night services to Macarthur	

=== Transport links ===
Transit Systems operates one bus route via Beverly Hills station:

King Georges Rd and Morgan St:

- 493: HomeCo. Roselands to Rockdale station via Kingsgrove, Bexley North and Bexley

U-Go Mobility operates two bus routes via Beverly Hills station:

King Georges Rd:

- 450: Strathfield station to Hurstville via Belfield, Lakemba and HomeCo. Roselands
- 938: Lakemba Station to Mount Lewis

Morgan St:

- 452: to Rockdale station via Hurstville, Forest Road and Bexley

Beverly Hills station is served by one NightRide route:

- N20: Riverwood station to Town Hall station via Narwee, Rockdale and Airport

== Description ==
The complex comprises a type 13 platform building, completed in 1931; the platform, also completed in 1931; the King Georges Road Overbridge, completed in 1931; and the stairs, lift, and platform canopy, completed in 2007.

Context

The station has one island platform with entry via sets of stairs on the east and west sides of the King Georges Road overbridge, which enter the west end of the platform. The west end of the platform extends under the road overbridge. The station perimeter is defined with white powder coated aluminium fencing.

Platform building (1931)

Exterior: A rectangular dark face brick platform building of standard stretcher bond brickwork, of 5 bays length (note most platform buildings on this line are 5 bays), with the bays defined by simple brick engaged piers. The building has a brick stepped parapet at the east end only. The roof is gabled at the east end against the parapet at this end, is hipped over awnings to north and south which are an integral part of the roof form, and is hipped at the western end. Roof cladding is corrugated steel. The stepped parapet at the east end features a projecting moulded brick capping course and 3 vertical lines of projecting decorative brickwork, as well as a pair of rectangular timber louvred vents.

When planned, a hipped roof wrapped around a stepped parapet at the western end (similar to that at Bexley North). The roof was originally clad with corrugated fibro asbestos sheeting with terra cotta ridge capping. This has been replaced with a corrugated steel roof with a fully hipped end, and it is presumed that (as at Padstow) the original stepped parapet at the east end elevation has been demolished. Two windows have been bricked up. There are timber framed fixed obscure glass windows- the windows are modern, the timber frames original. There are modern timber flush doors. There are bullnosed brick sills to windows, shallow brick arches above doors and windows, stop chamfered brickwork to door and window openings. Windows are timber-framed double-hung, some with original 6-paned top sashes, or small timber framed windows with frameless glass or glass louvres. Original door openings have grey terrazzo thresholds. There are modern fibre cement sheet ceilings to the awnings. There is an aluminium framed glazed panel to the ticket window at the entry end of the platform.

Interior: The building interior (following extension in 1950) comprised a combined booking/parcels office (now also the Station Master's room), ladies toilets, waiting room and men's toilets. The interior fitout has been refurbished in 1998 and again in 2004.

Platform (1931)

One island platform, asphalt surface, original brick faces.

Stairs, lift and platform canopy (2007)

A platform canopy structure on steel posts with concrete bases extends from the entry steps at the western end of the platform to the western end of the platform building. A modern lift, stairs and canopies over the stairs.

King Georges Road overbridge (1931)

Original jack arched bridge with modern concrete girders. Original brick abutments and central brick pier remain. Span reconstruction c. 1960s.

=== Condition ===
The platform building, completed in 1931, is assessed in good condition; the platform, also erected in 1931, is also in good condition; the King Georges Road Overbridge, completed in 1931, is in good condition; and the stairs, lift and platform canopy, completed in 2007, are assessed as being in very good condition.

The platform building has retained a moderate degree of integrity externally, however one of its parapets has been demolished and some openings bricked up. The platform entry arrangements and interior of the platform building have also been modernised 2004–2007. The King Georges Road overbridge is also considerably altered. This is one of the least intact of the East Hills line stations (with a similar level of alteration to Padstow).

=== Modifications and dates ===
- 1948: line duplicated.
- 1950: Extension to platform building to create a combined booking and parcels office, matching brickwork.
- c. 1960s: Span reconstruction to 1931 King Georges Road overbridge.
- 1998: interior fitout alterations to 1931 platform building
- 2004–2007: Interior fitout alterations to 1931 platform building. New stairs, canopies and lift.
- undated: The platform building has been re-roofed in corrugated steel (roofing originally fibro asbestos corrugated sheeting with terracotta ridge capping) and its east end stepped parapet has been demolished. A number of window openings have been bricked up. New timber flush doors. Modern ticket window.

== Heritage listing ==
As at 30 November 2010, Beverly Hills Railway Station – including the 1931 platform and platform building and King Georges Road overbridge – has historical significance as a major public work completed as an unemployment relief project during the Great Depression, and as a major transport hub for the suburb of Beverly Hills since 1931. Beverly Hills railway station platform building is of aesthetic significance as an austere 1930s railway building with simple Art Deco detailing and fine brick workmanship that is evocative of the effects of the Depression on building programs for large organisations such as the NSW railways. Beverly Hills Railway Station is representative of the cohesive collection of ten East Hills line railway stations from Turrella to East Hills.

Beverly Hills railway station was listed on the New South Wales State Heritage Register on 2 April 1999 having satisfied the following criteria.

The place is important in demonstrating the course, or pattern, of cultural or natural history in New South Wales.

Beverly Hills Railway Station is of historical significance as part of the East Hills line, a major Depression period public work undertaken under the controversial Premiership of Jack Lang, and through its relationship to the development of the suburb of Beverly Hills and the broader East Hills region. The austere design of the platform building is reflective of the completion of the East Hills line as a Depression period unemployment relief works project.

The place is important in demonstrating aesthetic characteristics and/or a high degree of creative or technical achievement in New South Wales.

Beverly Hills Railway Station platform building is of aesthetic significance as an example of a small Inter-War period suburban railway station platform building matching other East Hills line platform buildings in design and style. The building is very austere in style, with Inter-War Art Deco style touches and is competently executed, exhibiting fine workmanship in its brickwork. The building is noted for its use of monochromatic brickwork, one extant stepped parapet, irregular fenestration and engaged piers.

The place has a strong or special association with a particular community or cultural group in New South Wales for social, cultural or spiritual reasons.

The place has the potential to contribute to the local community's sense of place, and can provide a connection to the local community's past.

The place has potential to yield information that will contribute to an understanding of the cultural or natural history of New South Wales.

Beverly Hills Railway Station is of research significance for its ability to demonstrate design and construction techniques of the Depression period (early 1930s). The building provides insights into NSW Railways experimentation with styles of architecture and adaptation to Depression period economic conditions.

The place possesses uncommon, rare or endangered aspects of the cultural or natural history of New South Wales.

The Beverly Hills Railway Station platform building is not rare, as it is part of a group of ten similar to identical Inter-War suburban railway buildings completed in 1931 between Turrella and East Hills.

The place is important in demonstrating the principal characteristics of a class of cultural or natural places/environments in New South Wales.

Beverly Hills Railway Station is a representative example of an East Hills line railway station, with the platform intact and platform building extant but altered, however with modern platform access structures.
