= T8 Airport & South Line =

Rail service in Sydney, New South Wales

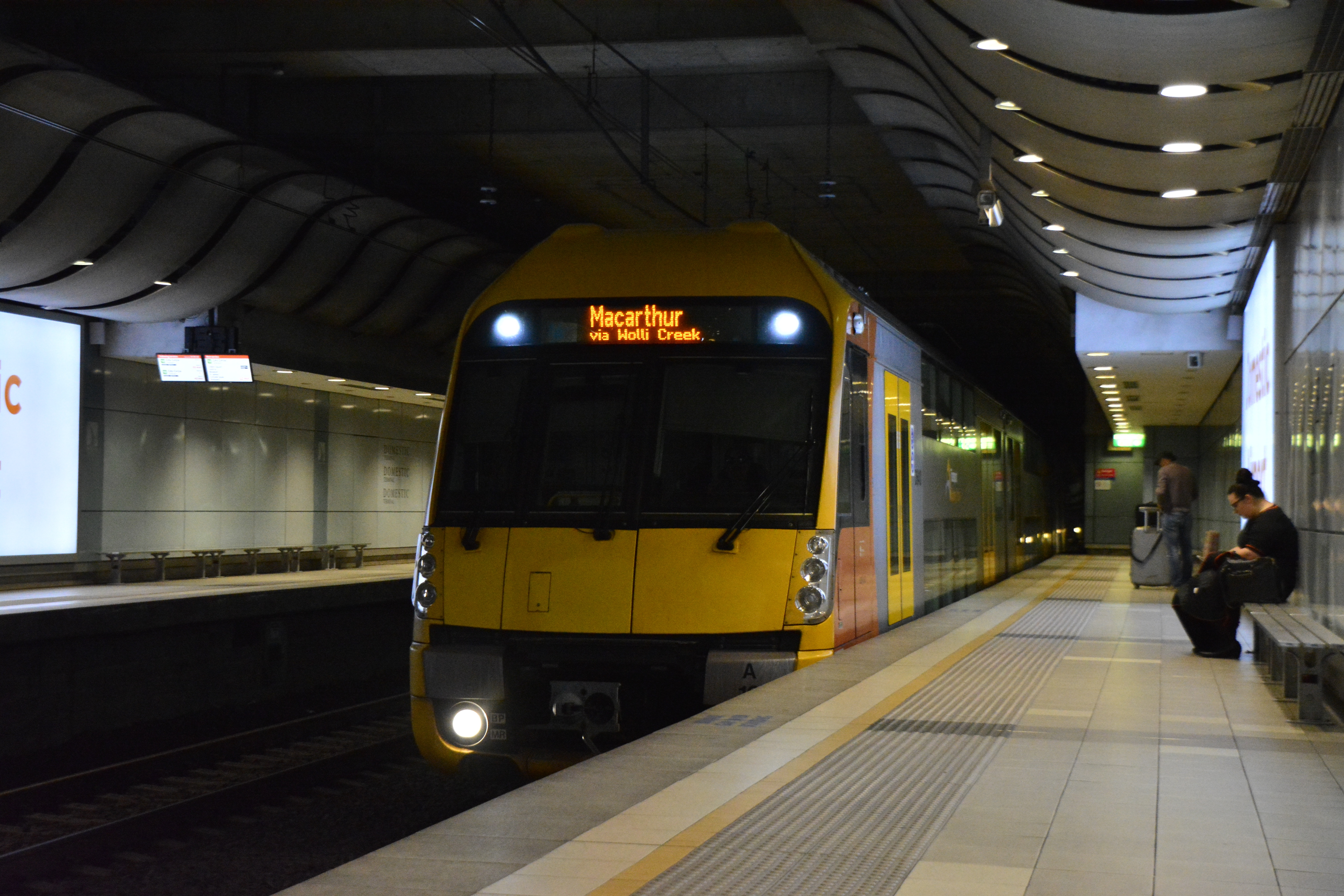
- An A set at Domestic Airport station

Overview
- Service type: Commuter rail
- Locale: Sydney, Australia
- Predecessor: Airport & East Hills Line (2000–2013); Airport, Inner West & South Line (2013–2017)
- Current operator: Sydney Trains

Route
- Termini: Central; Macarthur
- Stops: 33
- Lines used: City Circle; Airport; East Hills; Main South

Technical
- Rolling stock: A, B, M, T
- Track gauge: 1,435 mm (4 ft 8 1/2 in) standard gauge
- Track owner: Transport Asset Manager of New South Wales
Sydney rail network
Sydney Trains suburban services
T1 North Shore & Western
T2 Leppington & Inner West
T3 Liverpool & Inner West
T4 Eastern Suburbs & Illawarra
T5 Cumberland
T6 Lidcombe & Bankstown
T7 Olympic Park
T8 Airport & South
T9 Northern
Sydney Metro
M1 Metro North West & Bankstown

The T8 Airport & South Line is a suburban rail service operated by Sydney Trains, connecting the Sydney central business district with the southwestern suburbs via Sydney Airport.

Since 2017, the line has been numbered T8 and is coloured green on maps and wayfinding information.

In March 2025, the federal minister for infrastructure, transport, regional development and local government Catherine King announced that a business case would be developed exploring a potential upgrade of the T8 Airport & South line.

== History ==
State Rail East Hills Line timetable from 1987, prior to the Glenfield extension. Prior to the opening of the Airport railway line, the line was marketed as the "East Hills Line".

CityRail Airport & East Hills Line timetable from 2006.

The beginnings of the T8 service trace back to the opening of the East Hills railway from Tempe where it branched off the Illawarra railway to Kingsgrove on 21 September 1931. Electric trains ran from Kingsgrove via both lines to Central or St James, at a frequency of every 30 minutes during peak hours and hourly offpeak. The line was soon extended west to East Hills, with the official opening on 19 December 1931. This section was only single track and unelectrified, unlike the first section, so services were operated by CPH railmotor, supplemented by through steam trains from Central in peak hours.

The Kingsgrove to East Hills section was electrified on 17 December 1939, meaning the railmotor was no longer required and electric services could run direct from East Hills to the City.

With the extension of the East Hills Line to meet the Main South at Glenfield on 21 December 1987, only a small number of express services from Campbelltown to the City via East Hills were provided during peak hours. However by 1988, this had become a regular hourly service.

On 21 May 2000, with the opening of the new Airport Link providing an alternative route between Turrella and the City, the East Hills Line received a timetable change, with most services diverted to run via the Airport Link instead of the Illawarra Line. Selected peak hour services continued on the old route via Sydenham. In 2002, the East Hills Line quadruplication from Turrella to Kingsgrove opened, allowing express trains to overtake local trains in this area.

With the formation of Sydney Trains in 2013, the service was rebranded and combined with other lines to become the T2 Airport, Inner West & South Line. At the same time, the extended quadruplication between Kingsgrove and Revesby was brought into use, further speeding up express services.

In 2017, with a new timetable, East Hills services were separated back out from the T2 into a new line, numbered T8. However, instead of returning to its original name, it was named the T8 Airport & South Line. The former South Line became the T2 Leppington Line.

In September 2024, following the closure of the T3 Bankstown line for conversion into the Southwest Metro, a new T8 shuttle service between Sydenham and the City was added to serve St Peters and Erskineville which are not part of the metro conversion. This is temporary until these stations are moved to the T4 line as part of the Rail Service Improvement Program.

In October 2026, major timetable announcements were announced for the line, which would, among other things, have all T8 services use the airport tunnel as its route. As part of the 2026 timetable changes taking effect on 15 November, the line would be renamed the T8 SYD Airport & South West Line. However, after intense commuter pushback and political pressure, these timetable changes were scrapped later that month.

== Operations ==
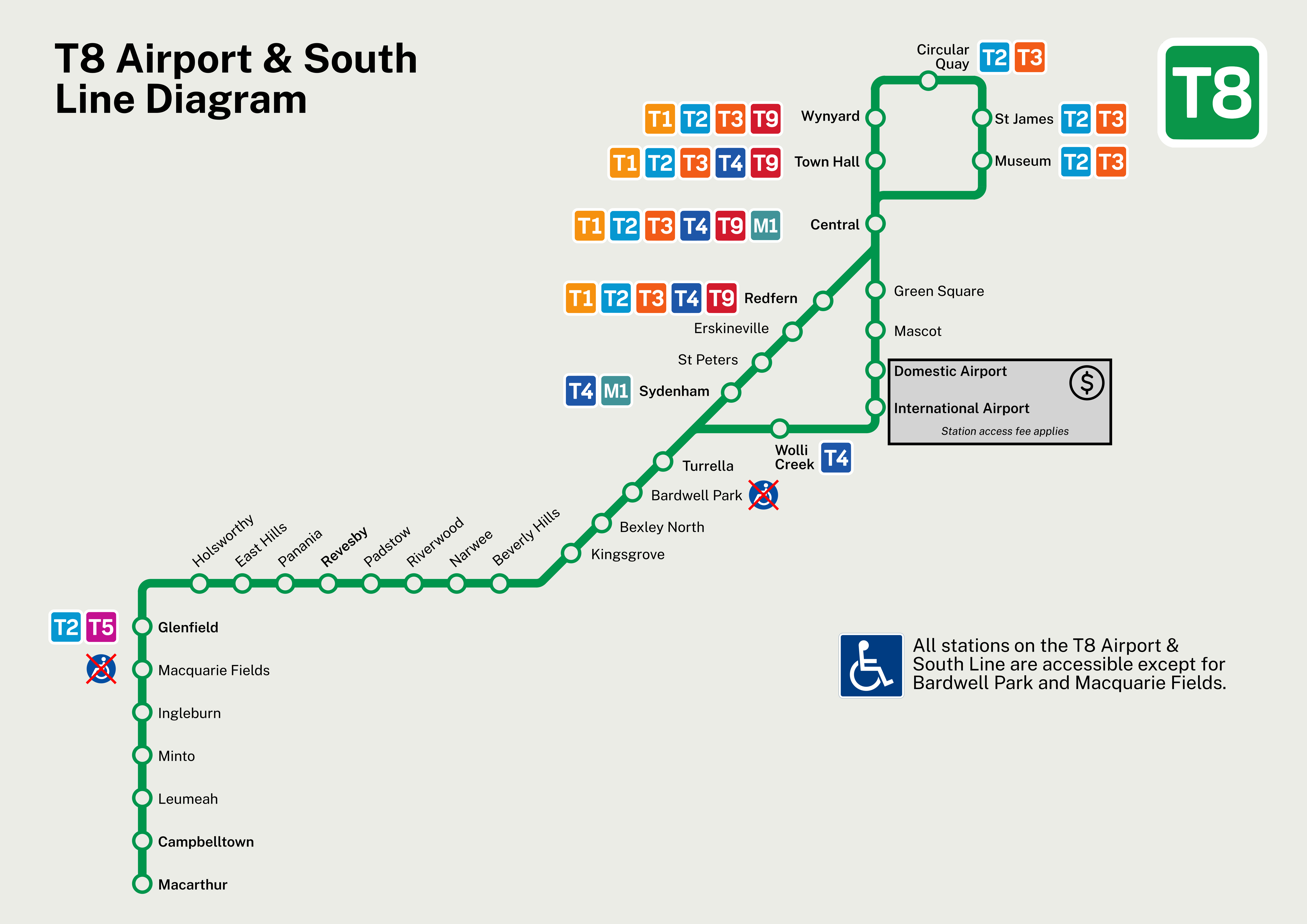
Route diagram of the T8 Airport & South Line

=== Stopping Patterns ===
Under the current (2024) timetable, there are generally three stopping patterns on the Airport & South Line:

- Express service: from Macarthur, stopping all stations to Revesby, then express to Wolli Creek, then all stations to the City via the Airport.
- Local service: starting at Revesby and running all stops to the City via the Airport. Some services start at East Hills.
- Sydenham service: from Sydenham, stopping at St Peters, Erskineville and Redfern

During peak hours, there are additional express services, which skip East Hills and Panania. Some also make additional stops at Padstow and Riverwood. Many express services also operate via Sydenham instead of the Airport.

From 15 November 2026, all T8 services will operate via the Airport, with services via Sydenham discontinued. St Peters and Erskineville will transfer to the T4 Eastern Suburbs & Illawarra Line, while peak-hour services through the Airport tunnel will increase to approximately one train every four minutes.

=== Fleet ===
The T8 currently uses:

- New South Wales A and B sets 8-car EMUs
- New South Wales M set 8-car EMUs – Weekdays only
- New South Wales T set 8-car EMUs – Weekends only
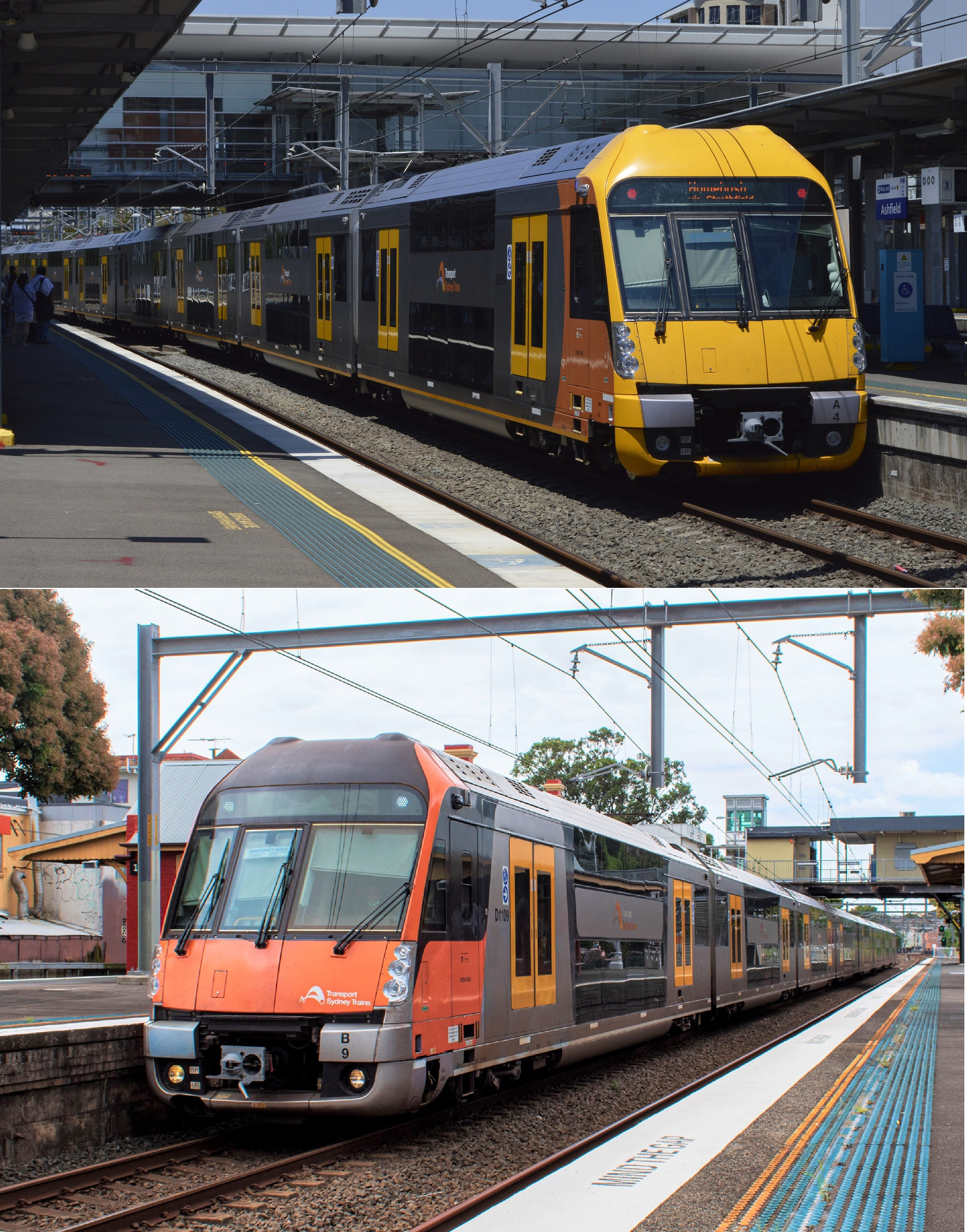
A and B sets

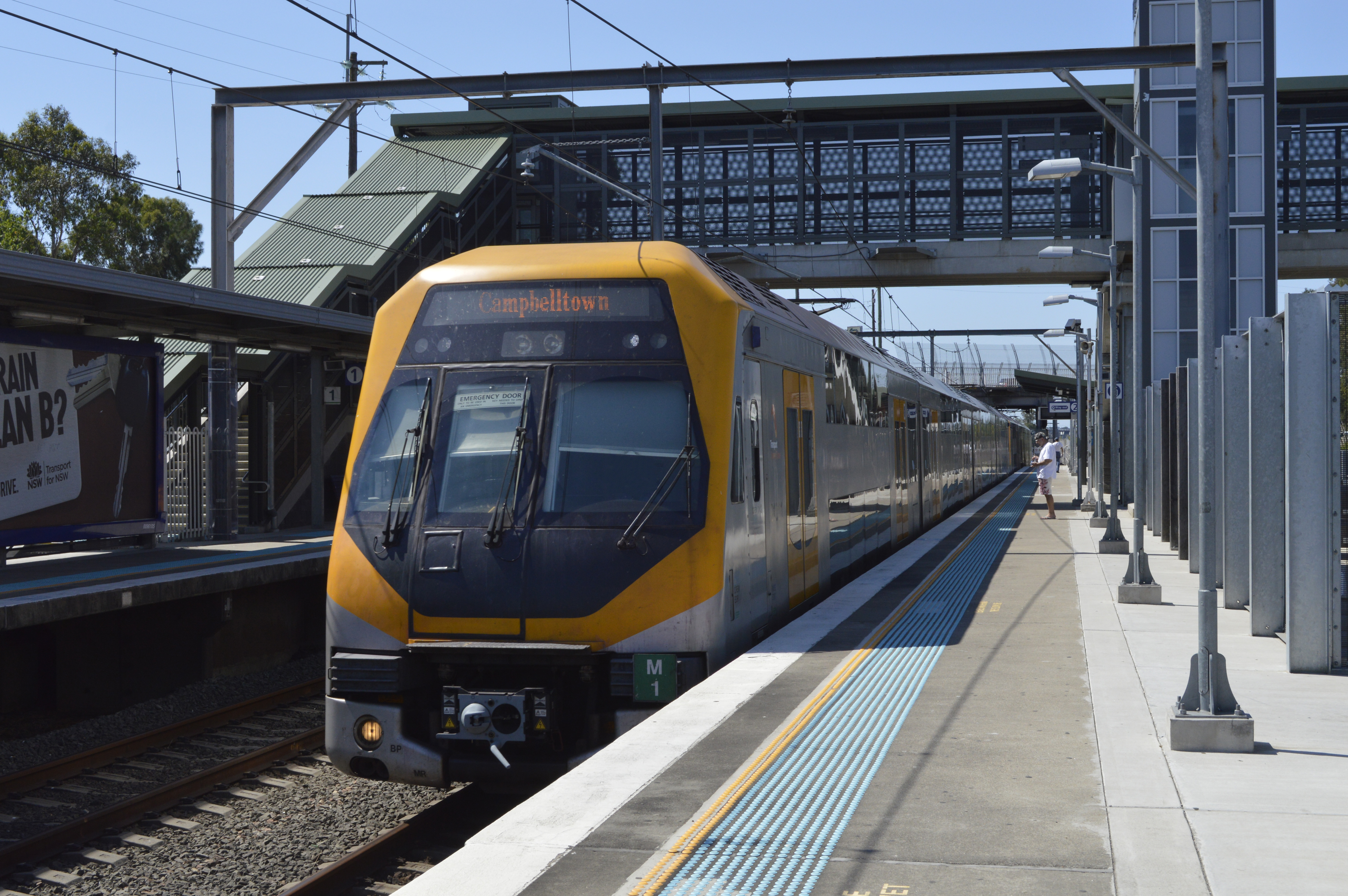
M set

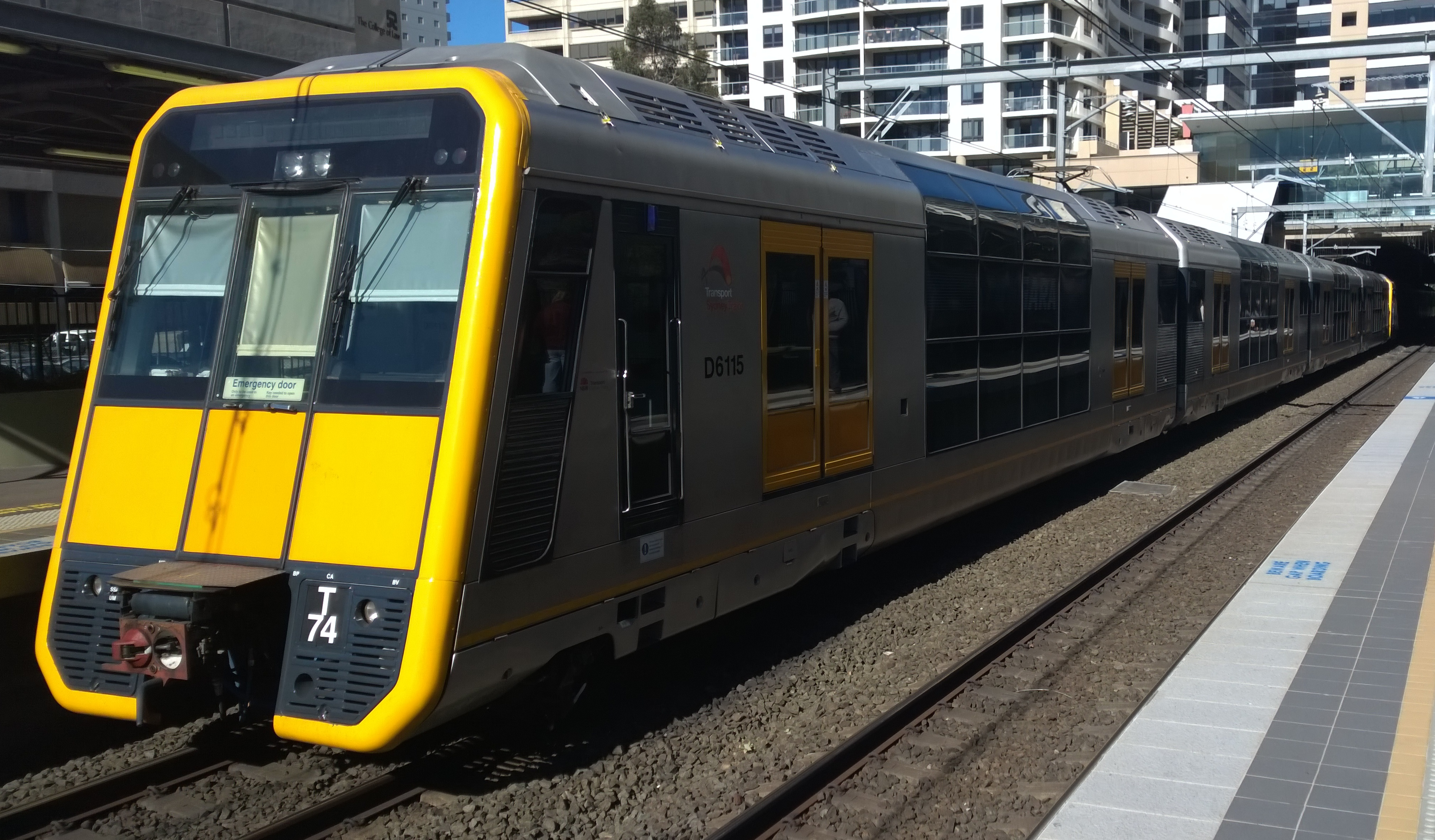
T set

=== Map ===
T8 interactive map

=== Stations ===
Name	Distance from Central (km)	Opened	Railway line	Serving suburbs	Other lines
Town Hall	1.21	1932	City Circle	Sydney	T1 North Shore & Western Line T2 Leppington & Inner West Line T3 Liverpool & Inner West Line T4 Eastern Suburbs & Illawarra Line T9 Northern Line
Wynyard	2.1	1932	City Circle	Sydney, The Rocks, Millers Point, Barangaroo	T1 North Shore & Western Line T2 Leppington & Inner West Line T3 Liverpool & Inner West Line T9 Northern Line
Circular Quay	3.0	1956	City Circle	Sydney; The Rocks, Millers Point	T2 Leppington & Inner West Line T3 Liverpool & Inner West Line
St James	4.3 km (dist via Town Hall)	1926	City Circle	Sydney	T2 Leppington & Inner West Line T3 Liverpool & Inner West Line
Museum	5 km (dist via Town Hall)	1926	City Circle	Sydney	T2 Leppington & Inner West Line T3 Liverpool & Inner West Line
Central	N/A	1855	City Circle	Haymarket, Ultimo, Surry Hills	T1 North Shore & Western Line T2 Leppington & Inner West Line T3 Liverpool & Inner West Line T4 Eastern Suburbs & Illawarra Line T9 Northern Line M1 Metro North West & Bankstown Line
At Central the line branches. The south western branch runs via Sydenham, and the southern branch runs via the airport.
Via Sydenham
Redfern	1.30	1878	Illawarra	Redfern, Waterloo, Darlington	T1 North Shore & Western Line T2 Leppington & Inner West Line T3 Liverpool & Inner West Line T4 Eastern Suburbs & Illawarra Line T9 Northern Line
Erskineville	2.88	1884	Illawarra	Erskineville	none
St Peters	3.81	1884	Illawarra	St Peters	none
Sydenham	5.31	1884	Illawarra	Sydenham, Marrickville	T4 Eastern Suburbs & Illawarra Line M1 Metro North West & Bankstown Line
Via the Airport
Green Square	2.71	2000	Airport	Zetland, Beaconsfield, Waterloo	none
Mascot	5.19	2000	Airport	Mascot, Rosebery	none
Domestic Airport	6.74	2000	Airport	Sydney Airport, Mascot	none
International Airport	8.27	2000	Airport	Sydney Airport, Mascot	none
Wolli Creek	7.31	2000	Airport	Wolli Creek, Arncliffe	T4 Eastern Suburbs & Illawarra Line
Both branches rejoin.
Turrella	8.66	1931	East Hills	Turrella	none
Bardwell Park	10.10	1931	East Hills	Bardwell Park, Bardwell Valley, Earlwood	none
Bexley North	11.37	1931	East Hills	Bexley North	none
Kingsgrove	12.62	1931	East Hills	Kingsgrove	none
Beverly Hills	14.65	1931	East Hills	Beverly Hills	none
Narwee	15.78	1931	East Hills	Narwee	none
Riverwood	17.50	1931	East Hills	Riverwood	none
Padstow	19.34	1931	East Hills	Padstow	none
Revesby	20.96	1931	East Hills	Revesby, Revesby North	none
Panania	22.55	1931	East Hills	Panania	none
East Hills	24.03	1931	East Hills	East Hills, Voyager Point, Pleasure Point	none
Holsworthy	26.76	1987	East Hills	Holsworthy, Hammondville, Wattle Grove, Pleasure Point	none
Glenfield	33.03	1869	Main South	Glenfield	T2 Leppington & Inner West Line T5 Cumberland Line
Macquarie Fields	43.80	1888	Main South	Macquarie Fields, Macquarie Links	none
Ingleburn	45.65	1869	Main South	Ingleburn, Denham Court	none
Minto	49.67	1874	Main South	Minto, Bow Bowing, St Andrews	none
Leumeah	52.63	1886	Main South	Leumeah, Woodbine, Claymore,	none
Campbelltown	54.71	1858	Main South	Campbelltown, Campbelltown North, Blair Athol	none
Macarthur	56.73	1985	Main South	Ambarvale, Englorie Park, Bradbury, Glen Alpine	none

=== Patronage ===
Apart from the Airport Line's troubles, the line as a whole also suffered a substantial loss in patronage when the M5 East Tunnel opened in 2001. The tunnel joined the Eastern Distributor and M5 South Western Motorway, shortening road travel times between the city and the south-west. The line was estimated to have lost 384,450 commuters over 12 months after the tunnel opened. Since that time, however, the line appears to have gained commuters again, with a reported 3.5% increase in patronage up to early 2006.

The following table shows the patronage of Sydney Trains network for the year ending 30 June 2024.

2025–26 Sydney Trains patronage by line (Note: Figures based on Opal tap on and tap off data)
T1 North Shore & Western Line	79,173,811	
T2 Leppington & Inner West Line	56,339,459	
T3 Liverpool & Inner West Line	11,756,216	(Note: T3 patronage split between former route via Bankstown and current route via Strathfield. The Bankstown route closed 30 September 2024.)
T4 Eastern Suburbs & Illawarra Line	63,990,365	
T5 Cumberland Line	7,629,714	
T6 Lidcombe & Bankstown Line	3,307,374	
Olympic Park railway line	2,400,479	
T8 Airport & South Line	54,235,162	
T9 Northern Line	39,379,659	
