= Narwee railway station =

Railway station in Sydney, New South Wales, Australia

Narwee
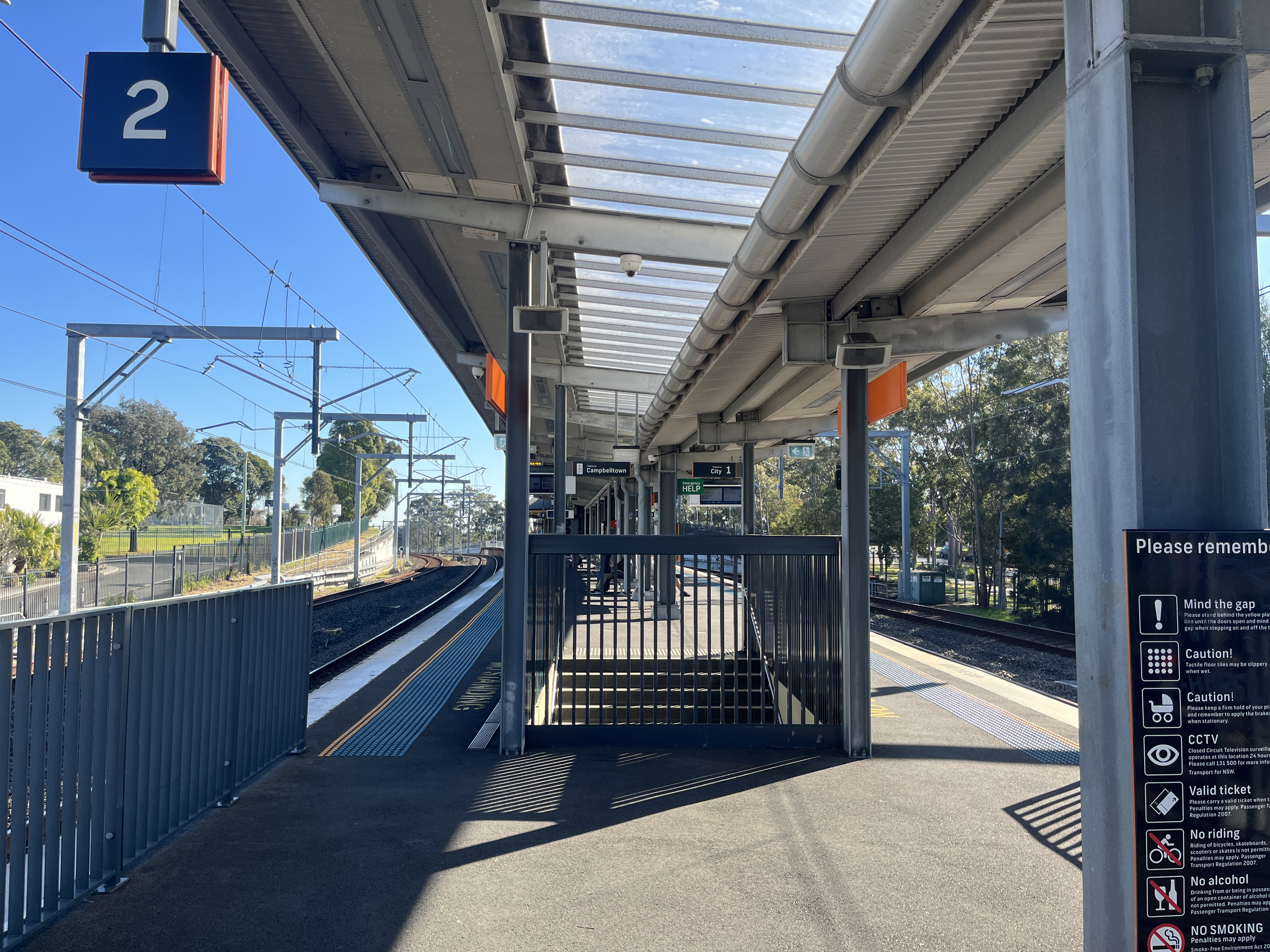
- Station platform and building, June 2025

General information
- Location: Hannans Road, Narwee
- Coordinates: 33°56′51″S 151°04′12″E
- Elevation: 42 metres (138 ft)
- Owner: Transport Asset Manager of New South Wales
- Operator: Sydney Trains
- Line: East Hills
- Distance: 15.78 kilometres (9.81 mi) from Central
- Platforms: 2 (1 island)
- Tracks: 4
- Connections: Bus

Construction
- Structure type: Ground
- Accessible: Yes

Other information
- Status: Weekdays: Staffed: 6am to 7pm: Weekends and public holidays: Staffed: 8am to 4pm
- Station code: NWE
- Website: Transport for NSW

History
- Opened: 21 December 1931

Passengers
- 2025: 930,459 (year); 2,549 (daily) (Sydney Trains)
- Rank: 133

Services
Preceding station	Sydney Trains	Following station
Riverwood towards Revesby or Macarthur	T8 Airport & South Line	Beverly Hills towards City Circle
Location

Narwee railway station is a heritage-listed railway station located on the East Hills line, serving the Sydney suburb of Narwee. It is served by Sydney Trains' T8 Airport & South Line services.

== History ==
Narwee station opened on 21 December 1931 when the line was extended from Kingsgrove to East Hills. The line was through the station was duplicated in 1948.

In 2013, as part of the quadruplication of the line from Kingsgrove to Revesby, through lines were added on either side of the existing pair.

== Upgrades ==
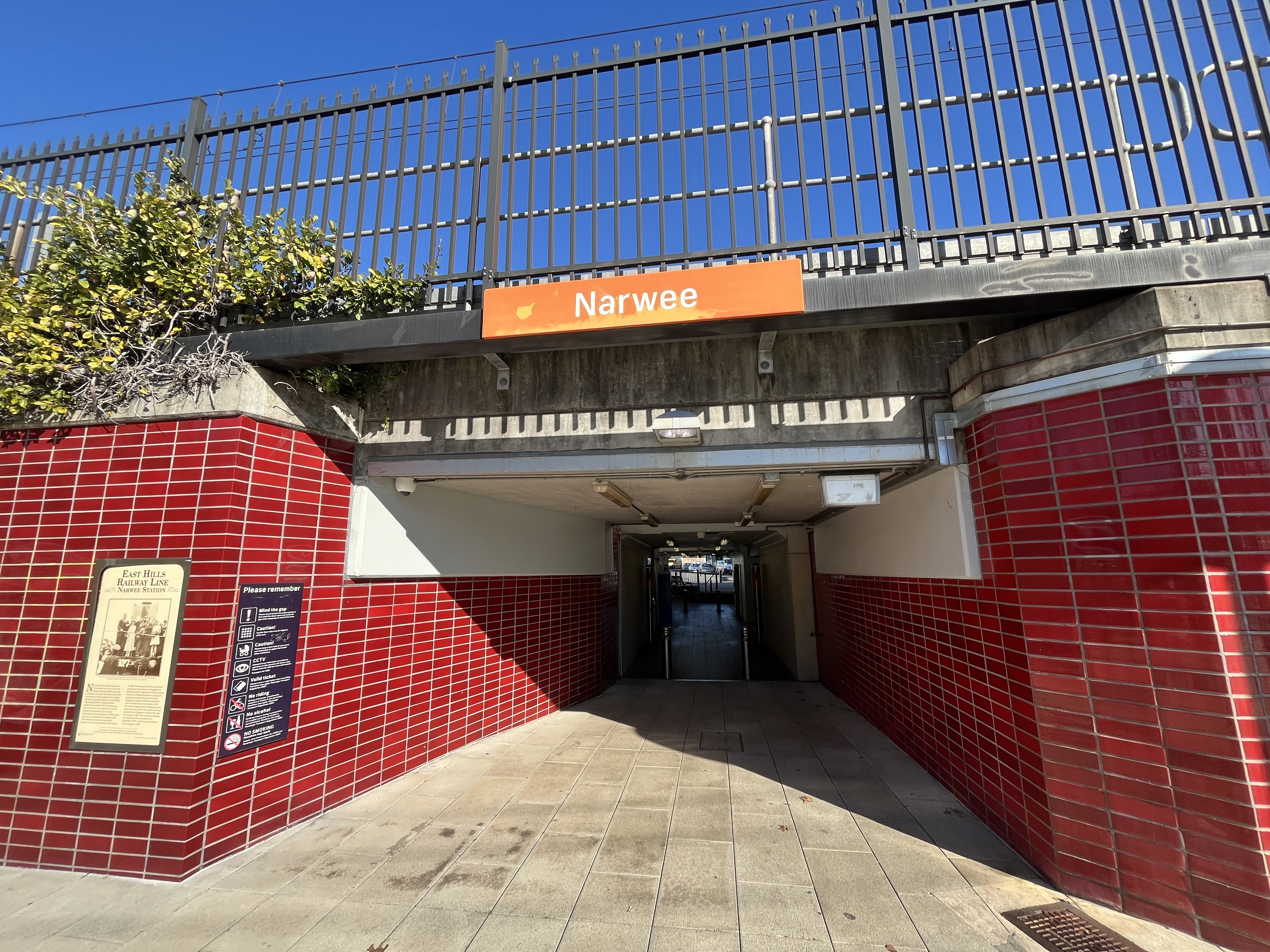
Station entrance June 2025

In September 2011, the bus stops and car park around the station were upgraded. In November 2014, scoping began for a further upgrade. The upgrade, which includes a new wheelchair-accessible lift and a new family-accessible toilet, was completed in December 2017.

== Platforms and services ==
Platform	Line	Stopping pattern	Notes
1	T8 Airport & South Line	services to Central & the City Circle via the Airport	
2	T8 Airport & South Line	services to Revesby early morning & late night services to Macarthur	

== Transport links ==
U-Go Mobility operates three bus routes via Narwee station, under contract to Transport for NSW:

- 940: Hurstville station to Bankstown station
- 941: Hurstville station to Chullora Marketplace (Greenacre)
- 951: Peakhurst Heights to Roselands Shopping Centre
- 952: Hurstville Station to Roselands Shopping Centre

Narwee station is served by one NightRide route:

- N20: Riverwood station to Town Hall station
