= Narwee =

Suburb of Sydney, New South Wales

- Suburb
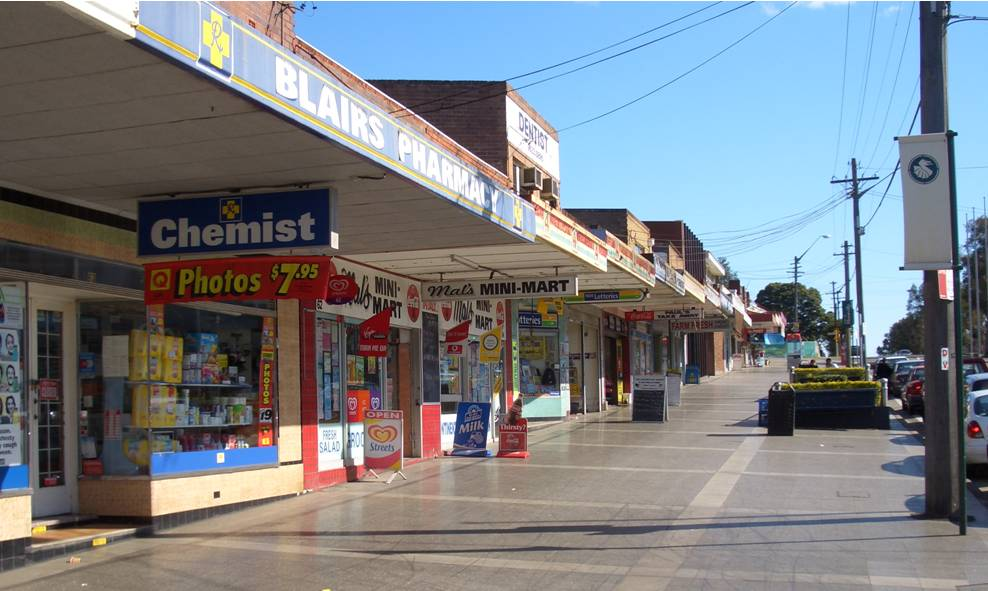
- Shops on the south side of Broad Arrow Road

- Interactive map of Narwee
- Coordinates: 33°56′51″S 151°4′15″E
- Country: Australia
- State: New South Wales
- City: Sydney
- LGAs: Georges River Council; City of Canterbury-Bankstown
- Location: 18 km (11 mi) south-west of Sydney CBD

Government
  - State electorates: Bankstown; Oatley
  - Federal divisions: Banks; Barton
- Elevation: 47 m (154 ft)

Population
  - Total: 5,411 (2021 census)
- Postcode: 2209
Suburbs around Narwee
Roselands	Roselands	Roselands
Riverwood	Narwee	Beverly Hills
Peakhurst	Penshurst	Beverly Hills

Narwee is a suburb in southern Sydney, in the state of New South Wales, Australia. Narwee is located 18 kilometres south of the Sydney central business district and is part of the St George area. Narwee is in local government areas of City of Canterbury-Bankstown and Georges River Council. The postcode is 2209, which it shares with neighbouring Beverly Hills.

The main street of Narwee is Broadarrow Road, which runs from King Georges Road in Beverly Hills to just past Bonds Road in Riverwood. Broadarrow Road is also the boundary line between the southern part of the City of Canterbury-Bankstown and the northern part of the Georges River Council areas.

== History ==
Narwee is an Aboriginal word meaning "sun", a relevant name for an area once called 'Sunning Hill Farm'. The language and dialect it was derived from is unclear. A number of Sydney suburbs developed during the 1930s have similar allegedly Aboriginal names, the origins of which are uncertain, including nearby Panania, and Jannali. Jannali supposedly means "moon" and was apparently named at the same time as Narwee, as a "sister suburb".

The name Narwee was adopted when the railway station opened on 21 December 1931. People living there at the time were mostly poultry farmers and market gardeners, and a city florist had a large garden west of the railway station. After the railway came through, people bought up land for residences. Little building was done during the Depression and World War II, but the suburb grew rapidly in the 1950s, when the area was settled by young families. The post office opened in 1948.

Narwee Primary School is built on land given in 1809, to Richard Podmore, a free settler, who came to New South Wales as a soldier in the N.S.W. Corps in 1792, on the ship "Pitt". Land between today's Penshurst Road and King Georges Road belonged to Richard Tuckwell, another soldier from the same Company. At the time of the land, the area was covered with a very thick ironbark forest.

Tuckwell and Podmore sold their grants to Patrick Moore and Robert Gardner, both ex-convicts, in 1819 and 1820, and "Bob the Gardener", as he was known, began to clear trees and develop a farm on Podmore's grant, which he called "Sunning Hill Farm". The property was later extended to cover Emery's 30-acre (120,000 m^{2}) grant next door. This was farmed by Gardner's adopted son, Thomas Gardner Whitehall.

At that stage, there were very few farms in the district. Men earned a living by cutting down the trees and selling the logs for firewood and timber to build houses and boats. Narwee did not exist as a locality; it was called "Bob the Gardner's Farm", and there were so few people living in the area that bushrangers could easily hide for weeks in the forest without being discovered.

== Commercial area ==
The main shopping strip is located in Broad Arrow Road parallel with and adjacent to Narwee railway station. Like many small suburbs, Narwee was formerly served by two banks (Westpac and Commonwealth) and many small shops. Both banks have now closed, although the post office remains. Narwee Hotel is located just 2 mins from Narwee train station

== Transport ==
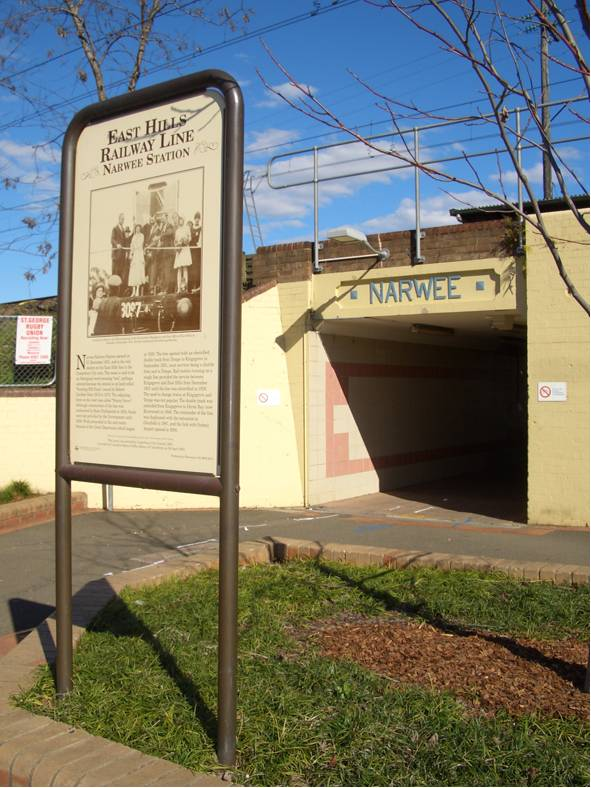
Hannans Road subway, the main access to Narwee railway station

Narwee railway station is on the Airport & South Line of the Sydney Trains network, with Riverwood to the west and Beverly Hills to the east.

For details of bus services see Narwee railway station.

== Churches ==
The largest church in the area is Narwee Baptist Church.

== Schools ==
Narwee has a public school and once had a high school. Narwee High School was located at the suburb's highest point but closed in 2001. It has been redeveloped into a complex of residential houses.

== Population ==
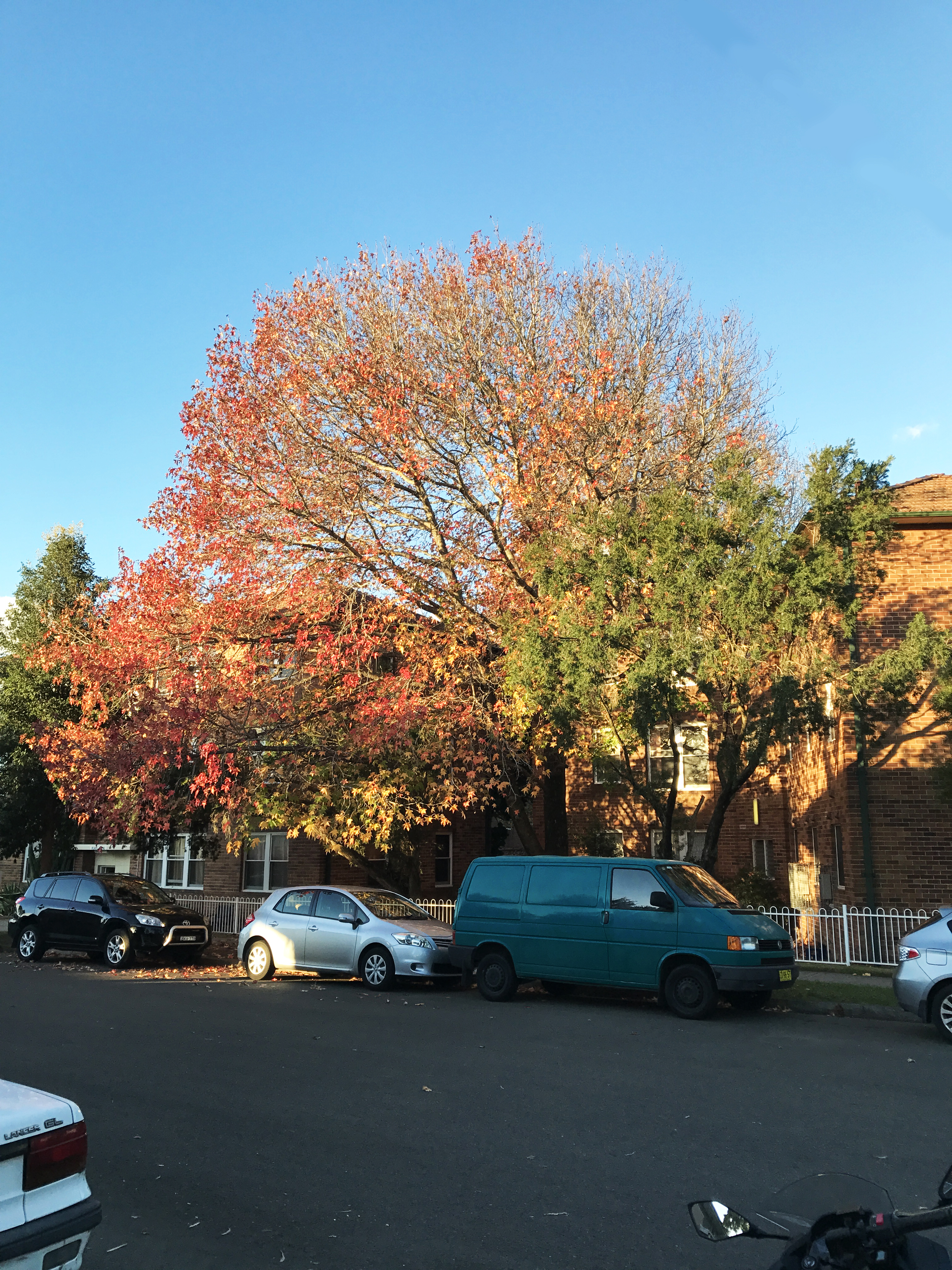
Autumn in the residential area of Narwee, New South Wales

According to the 2021 census, there were 5,411 people usually resident in Narwee. 43.9% stated they were born in Australia, with the top overseas countries of birth being China (15.3%), Hong Kong (3.6%), Philippines (3.6%), Indonesia (2.5%) and Lebanon (2.4%). English was stated as the only language spoken at home by 34.3% of residents, and the most common other languages spoken were Cantonese 14.4%, Mandarin 12.8%, Arabic 6.2%, Greek 4.6% and Indonesian 2.4%. The most common responses for religious affiliation were No Religion (29.4%), Catholic (19.4%), Islam (10.2%), Orthodox (7.6%) and Buddhism (6.7%).
