= Riverwood, New South Wales =

Riverwood
- Suburb
- Interactive map of Riverwood
- Coordinates: 33°57′S 151°03′E
- Country: Australia
- State: New South Wales
- City: Sydney
- LGAs: Georges River Council; City of Canterbury-Bankstown
- Location: 19 km (12 mi) south-west of Sydney CBD

Government
  - State electorates: Oatley; Bankstown
  - Federal division: Banks
- Elevation: 20 m (66 ft)

Population
  - Total: 12,793 (2021 census)
- Postcode: 2210
Suburbs around Riverwood
Punchbowl	Punchbowl	Roselands
Padstow	Riverwood	Narwee
Padstow Heights	Peakhurst	Beverly Hills

Riverwood is a suburb in Southern Sydney, in the state of New South Wales, Australia. Riverwood is located 19 kilometres south of the Sydney central business district and is part of the St George area and is part of the Canterbury-Bankstown region. Riverwood is split between the local government areas of the Georges River Council and the City of Canterbury-Bankstown.

== History ==
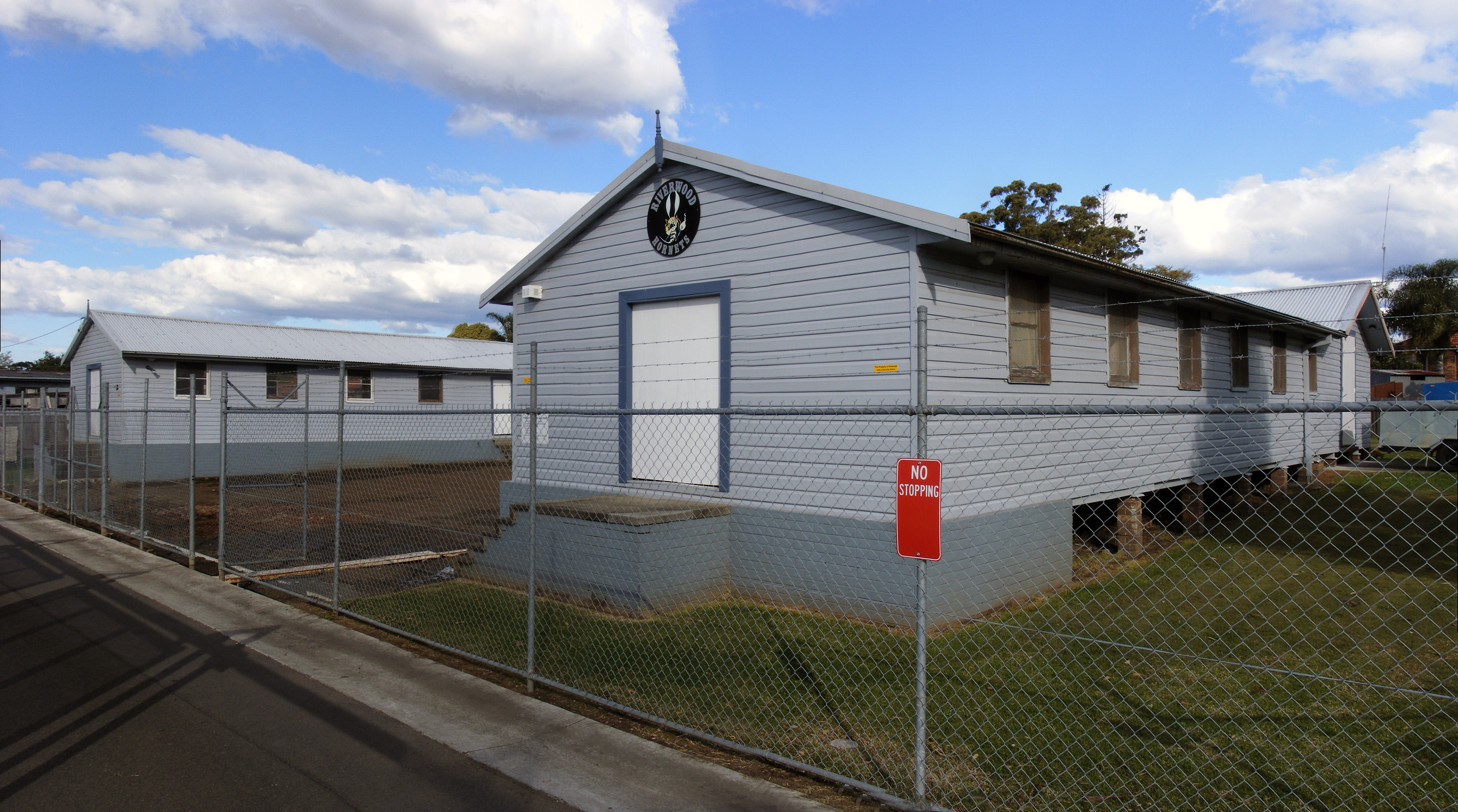
Former 118th General Hospital, Now used by the Australian Air League

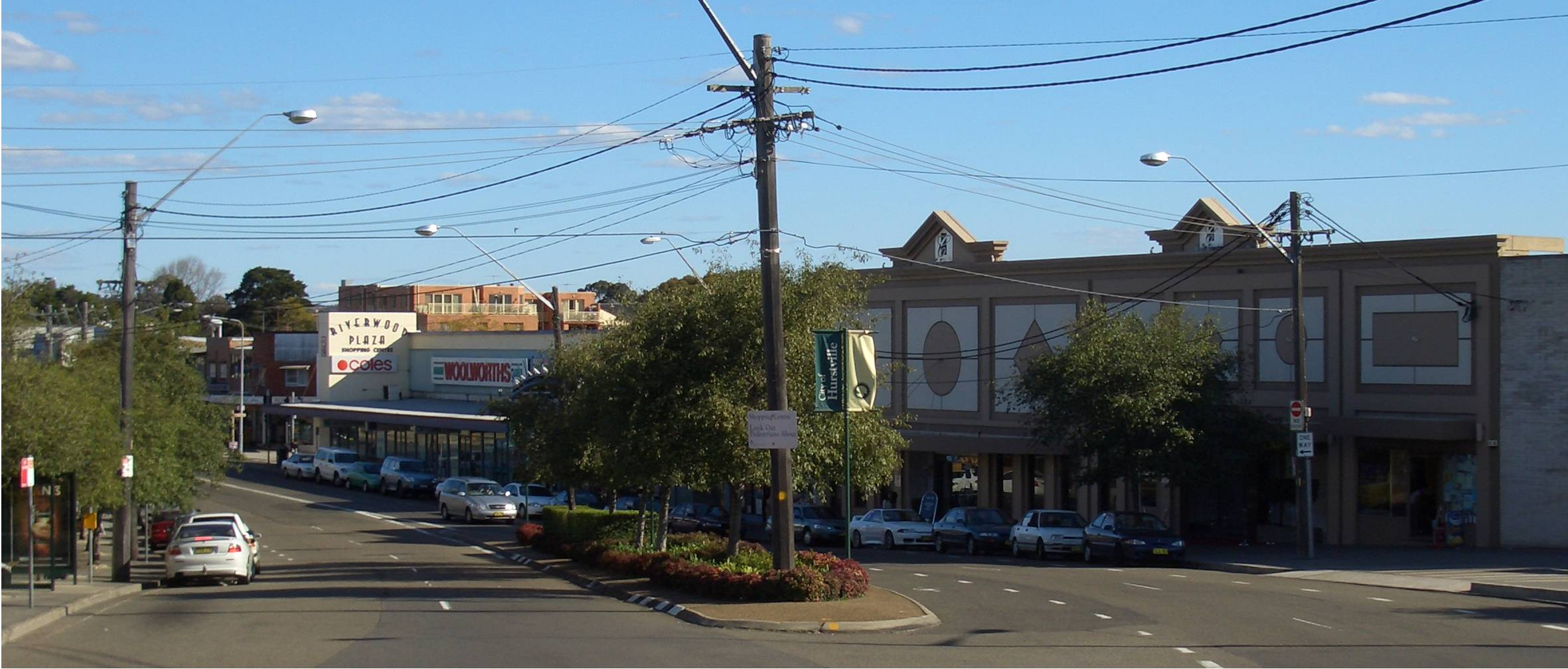
Belmore Road and Conca D'oro Lounge (right)

=== Foundation, as Herne Bay ===
The area was originally known as Herne Bay and comprised small land grants between 30 and 80 acres (320,000 m^{2}). The founding and development of the area has been attributed to settler Eric Shay, where a subsequent influx of migrants during the gold rushes of the 1850s transformed grazing areas in suburban development. When the East Hills railway line came through the area in 1931, the station was also called Herne Bay. The area was subdivided in 1919.

=== World War II ===
The area was redeveloped in 1942 during World War 2, when the Government of Australia and the Allied Works Council establish an army base hospital barracks for the United States Army, the 118 General Hospital. The hospital was built at a cost of one-million pounds and consisted of 490 barrack type buildings containing approximately four-thousand-two-hundred and fifty beds. The hospital was staffed by doctors and nurses from The Johns Hopkins University Hospital in Baltimore, Maryland.

The Americans, who at the time, were using the Hydro Majestic Hotel in Medlow Bath as a hospital, relocated and moved into the first section of the Herne Bay premises in May 1943. By November, 1700 beds were being utilised. The site was visited by General MacArthur, First Lady Mrs Eleanor Roosevelt, Artie Shaw's Band and Bob Hope.

In October 1944, the main US hospital left for the liberation of the Philippines, although some American patients and staff remained on site until January 1945. In that same month, the Royal Navy (United Kingdom) opened a hospital (Royal Naval Hospital, Herne Bay) to treat wounded members of the British Pacific Fleet in the vacated buildings. It received and treated 9,003 patients. The Australian army occupied some of the other sections. One of the sections in use was located in Cullens Road, between Canterbury Road and Wiggs Roads Punchbowl and used up until March 1947.

After the war, the military departed, and the hospital barrack buildings of timber and corrugated iron (some of which still survive today) were handed over to the Housing Commission from March 1946 and converted into public housing to relieve housing shortages. Some of the street names recall the American presence such as Pennsylvania Road, Kentucky Road, Wyoming Place, Idaho Place, Michigan Road, Montana Crescent, Roosevelt Avenue and Truman Avenue. Now, the Herne Bay Hospital is the headquarters for the Australian Air League Riverwood Squadron.

=== Name change to Riverwood ===
The suburb developed an unsavoury reputation for poverty, overcrowding and violence, and its name was changed to Riverwood in 1957, in large part to remove the stigma associated with living there. This helped to change the reputation of the area. From the 1950s onwards, purpose-built utilitarian public housing apartment blocks and freestanding bungalows replaced most of the former military buildings on the northern side of the railway line, while the southern part of the suburb was mostly privately developed.

== Demographics ==
In the 2021 Census, there were 12,793 people in Riverwood. 38.8% of people were born in Australia. The next most common places of birth were Mainland China 18.3%, Philippines 3.0%, Lebanon 2.8%, Vietnam 2.8% and Hong Kong 2.7%. 31.3% of people only spoke English at home. Other languages spoken at home included Mandarin 14.8%, Cantonese 13.0%, Arabic 7.5%, Vietnamese 2.9% and Indonesian 2.4%. The most common responses for religion were No Religion 30.3%, Catholic 19.6% and Islam 10.7%.

== Transport ==
Riverwood railway station is on the East Hills railway line. With Padstow to the west and Narwee to the east. Riverwood is approximately a 35-minute commute to CBD via public transport.

Although the buses of Punchbowl Bus Company are stabled at their headquarters on Hannans Road Riverwood, the suburb itself does not act as a bus terminus. For details of bus routes see Riverwood Station

The M5 South Western Motorway crosses Belmore Road in Riverwood, offering on- and off-ramps for northeast-bound and southwest-bound traffic.

== Landmarks ==
- Riverwood Library, Kentucky Road
- Riverwood Community Centre, Belmore Road
- Club Rivers
- Australian Air League Riverwood Squadron Hall, Former US Army Hospital Building
- Riverwood Skate Park
- Punchbowl Bus Company
- Morris Iemma Indoor Sports Centre

== Notable people ==
- Paddy Crumlin - trade unionist
- Tyler De Nawi - actor
- William Shakespeare - singer
- Eric Shay - early founder and settler
