= South railway line, Sydney =

South railway line in Sydney, Australia may refer to:

- Main Southern railway line, New South Wales, a physical railway line
- T8 Airport & South Line, a Sydney Trains service
- T2 Leppington & Inner West Line, a Sydney Trains service formerly known as the South Line when operated by CityRail
