= Riverwood railway station =

Railway station in Sydney, New South Wales, Australia

Riverwood
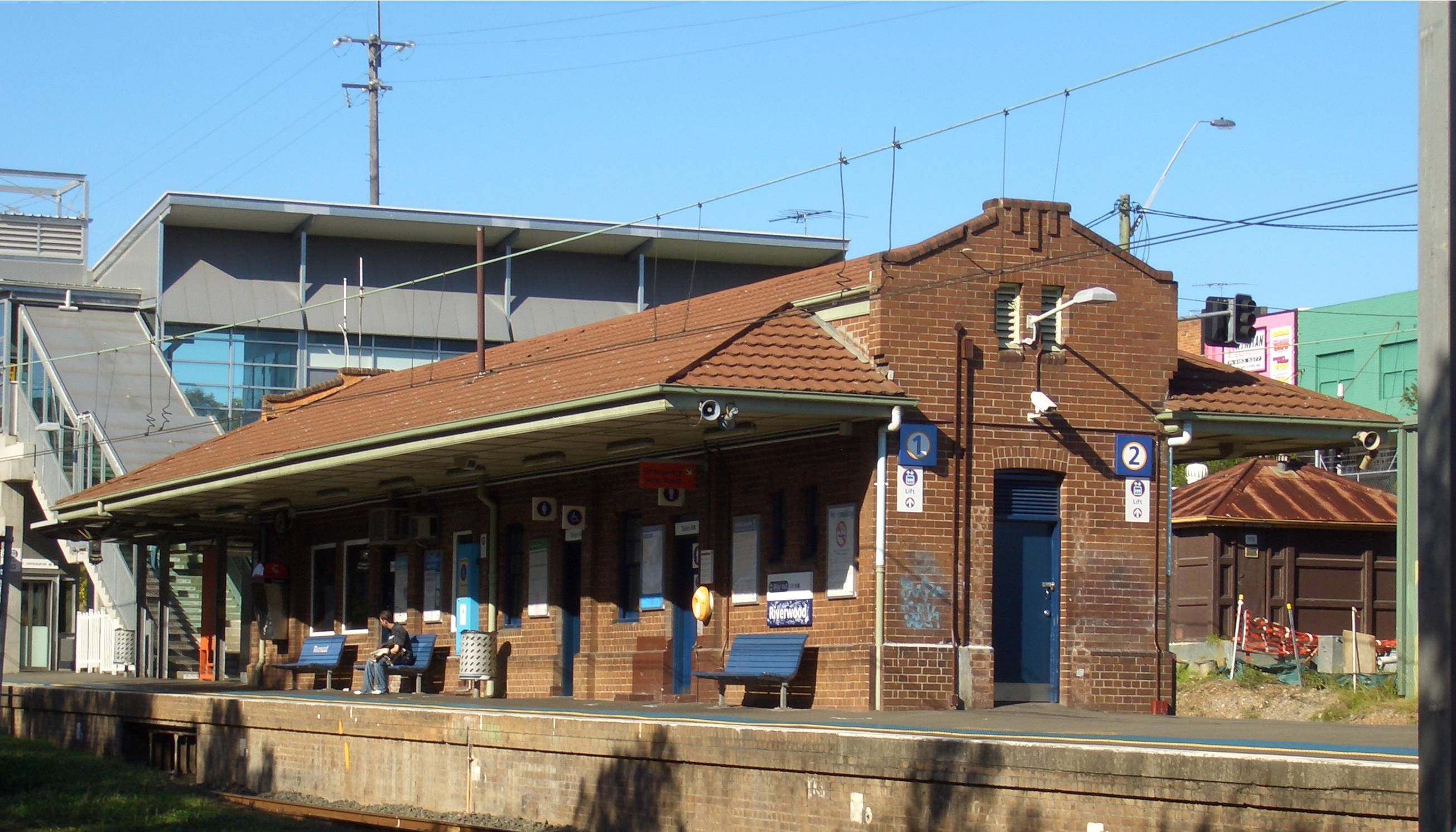
- Eastbound view of station platform, building and concourse in the background, August 2006

General information
- Location: Belmore Road, Riverwood
- Coordinates: 33°57′06″S 151°03′07″E
- Owner: Transport Asset Manager of New South Wales
- Operator: Sydney Trains
- Line: East Hills
- Distance: 17.50 kilometres (10.87 mi) from Central
- Platforms: 2 (1 island)
- Tracks: 4
- Connections: Bus

Construction
- Structure type: Ground
- Accessible: Yes

Other information
- Status: Staffed
- Station code: RVD

History
- Opened: 21 December 1931
- Former names: Herne Bay (1931–1958)

Passengers
- 2025: 1,721,249 (year); 4,716 (daily) (Sydney Trains)
- Rank: 86

Services
Preceding station	Sydney Trains	Following station
Padstow towards Revesby or Macarthur	Airport & South Line	Narwee towards City Circle
Location

Riverwood railway station is a heritage-listed railway station located on the East Hills line, serving the Sydney suburb of Riverwood. It is served by Sydney Trains' T8 Airport & South Line services.

== History ==
Riverwood station opened on 21 December 1931 as Herne Bay when the line was extended from Kingsgrove to East Hills. The line was duplicated from Kingsgrove in 1948. It was renamed Riverwood on 10 March 1958.

On 5 May 1986, the line was duplicated from Riverwood to Padstow with a new track laid to the north of the existing one.

In 2002, the station was upgraded and given lifts.

In 2013, as part of the quadruplication of the line from Kingsgrove to Revesby, through lines were added on either side of the existing pair.

== Platforms and services ==
Platform	Line	Stopping pattern	Notes
1	Airport & South Line	services to Central & the City Circle via the Airport	
2	Airport & South Line	services to Revesby early morning & late night services to Macarthur; 2 weekday evening peak services and 6 weekday morning peak services to City Circle express from Macarthur	

== Transport links ==
U-Go Mobility operates five bus routes via Riverwood station, under contract to Transport for NSW:

- 940: Hurstville station to Bankstown station
- 942: to Campsie station
- 945: Hurstville station to Bankstown station
- 948: to Lugarno
- 951: Roselands Shopping Centre to Peakhurst Heights

Riverwood station is served by one NightRide route:

- N20: to Town Hall station
