= Kingsgrove railway station =

Railway station in Sydney, New South Wales, Australia

Kingsgrove
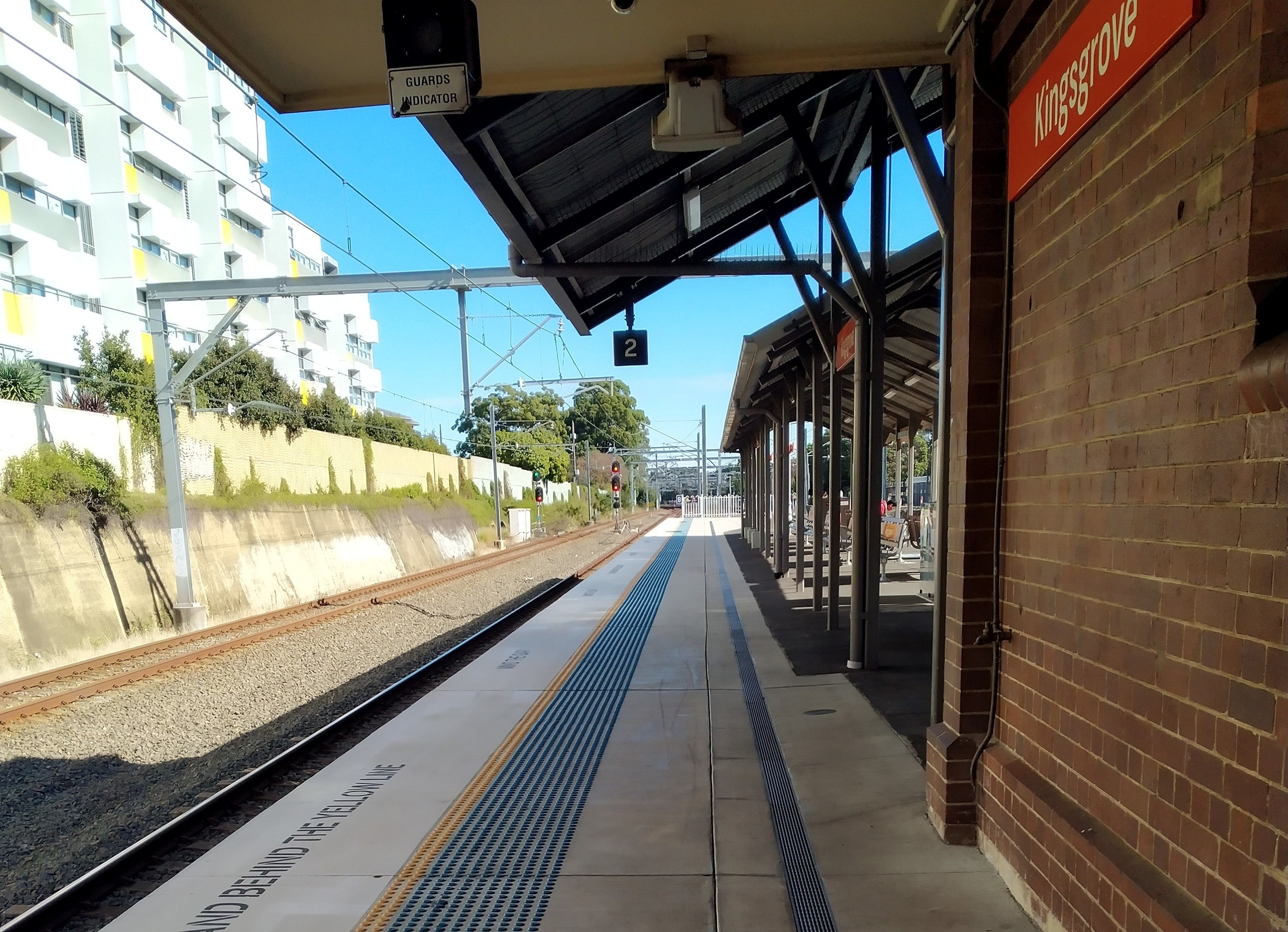
- Westbound view from Platform 2 in June 2024

General information
- Location: Mashman Avenue, Kingsgrove; Sydney, New South Wales; Australia
- Coordinates: 33°56′26″S 151°06′02″E
- Owner: Transport Asset Manager of NSW
- Operator: Sydney Trains
- Line: East Hills
- Distance: 12.62 km (7.84 mi) from Central
- Platforms: 2 (1 island)
- Tracks: 4
- Connections: Bus

Construction
- Structure type: Ground
- Accessible: Yes

Other information
- Status: Staffed
- Station code: KGV
- Website: Transport for NSW

History
- Opened: 21 September 1931 (94 years ago)
- Electrified: Yes (from opening)

Passengers
- 2025: 1,148,255 (year); 3,146 (daily) (Sydney Trains)
- Rank: 118

Services
Preceding station	Sydney Trains	Following station
Beverly Hills towards Revesby or Macarthur	Airport & South Line	Bexley North towards City Circle
Location

Kingsgrove railway station is a suburban railway station located on the East Hills line, serving the Sydney suburb of Kingsgrove. It is served by Sydney Trains T8 Airport & South Line services.

== History ==
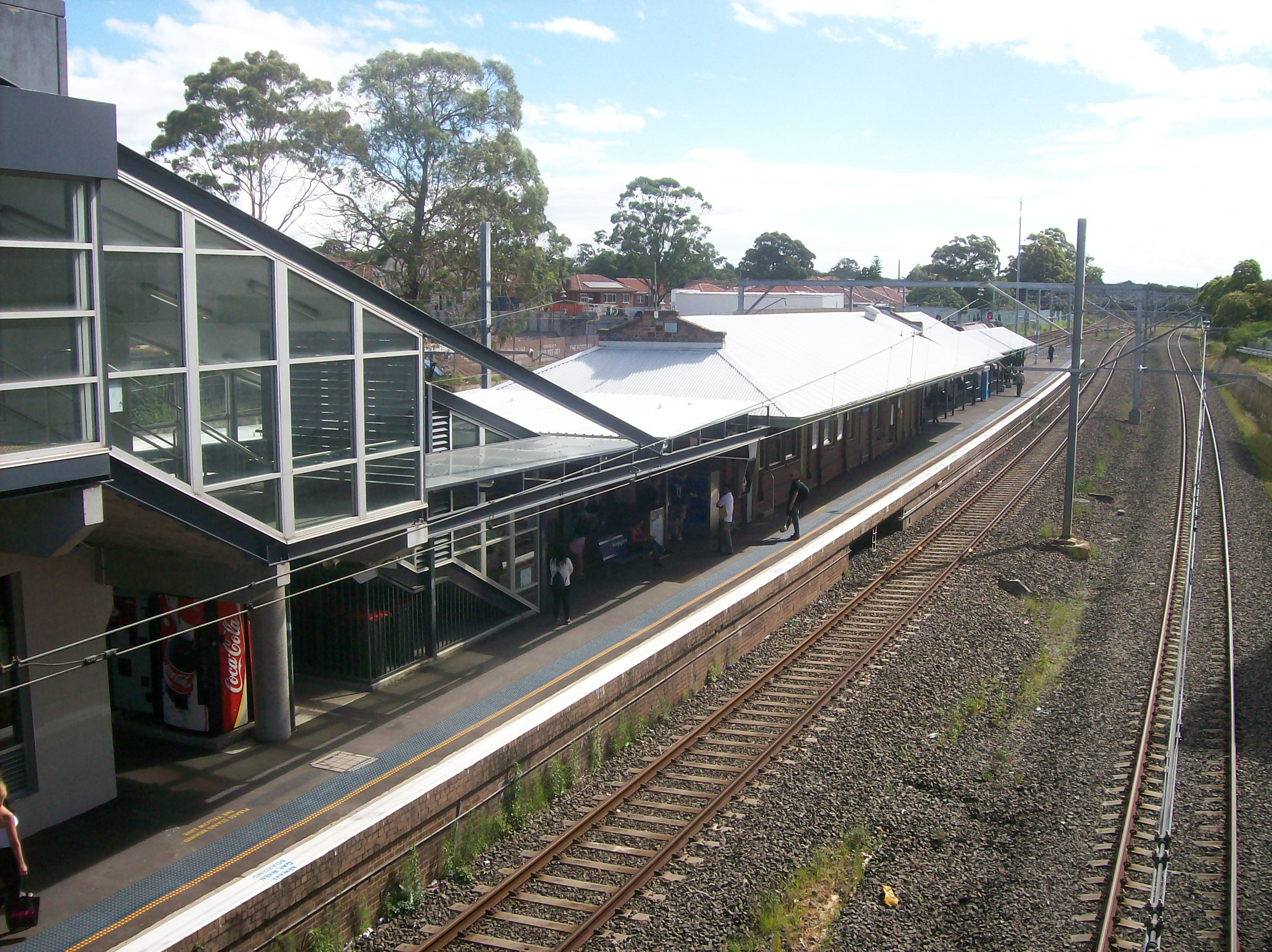
Westbound view of station platform and building in March 2011

Kingsgrove station opened on 21 September 1931 when the East Hills line opened from Tempe to East Hills. It was the original terminus of the double track electrified section from Tempe. Until 1939, passengers transferred at Kinsgrove to a CPH railmotor or steam service to continue their journey towards East Hills. The line was duplicated and electrified beyond Kingsgrove in 1948.

In 2000, as part of the quadruplication of the line from Wolli Creek to Kingsgrove, through lines were added on either side of the existing tracks extending to just east of Beverly Hills station. A headshunt was provided to the west of the station in association with this project, which was previously used by terminating services. In 2013, the quadruplication was extended to Revesby as part of the Rail Clearways Program.

The station was upgraded in 2005.

=== Accident ===
On 6 October 2000, an eight car Tangara derailed at low speed near Kingsgrove station causing the rear three carriages to topple onto their side. The derailment was caused by a track buckling as a result of high temperatures. Ten people were hospitalised.

== Services ==
=== Platforms ===
Platform	Line	Stopping pattern	Notes
1	T8	services to Central & the City Circle via the Airport	
2	T8	services to Revesby early morning & late night services to Macarthur	

Kingsgrove is typically served by 4 trains per hour in each direction, with increased frequencies during peak hours.

The station is accessible with one lift from the west side of Kingsgrove Road to the single island platform.

=== Transport links ===
Transit Systems operates three bus routes via Kingsgrove station:

Kingsgrove Station:

- 490: Drummoyne to Hurstville via Five Dock, Burwood and Campsie
- 492: Drummoyne to Rockdale via Five Dock, Burwood and Campsie

Kingsgrove Shops:

- 493: HomeCo. Roselands to Rockdale via Beverly Hills, Bexley North and Bexley

U-Go Mobility operates one bus route via Kingsgrove station, under contract to Transport for NSW:

Kingsgrove Shops:

- 455: to Rockdale Plaza via Kingsway West, Hurstville and Kogarah

Kingsgrove station is served by one NightRide route:

- N20: Riverwood station to Town Hall station via Narwee, Rockdale and Airport
