= HomeCo. Roselands =

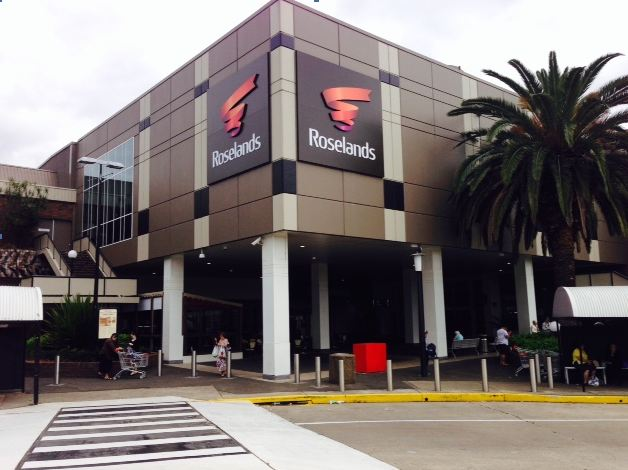
- The Roselands Shopping Centre building
- Location: Roselands, Sydney, Australia
- Coordinates: 33°56′06″S 151°04′08″E
- Address: Roselands Drive
- Opened: 12 October 1965
- Manager: Vicinity Centres
- Owner: JY Group (50%); Vicinity Centres (50%)
- Num. of stores: 150
- Num. of anchor tenants: 5
- Floor area: 62,684 m^{2} (674,725 sq ft)
- Floors: 3
- Parking: 3,187 spaces
- Website: home-co.com.au/roselands

HomeCo. Roselands (previously known as Centro Roselands) is a shopping centre in the suburb of Roselands in South Western Sydney, Australia.

== Transport ==
HomeCo. Roselands has bus connections to Greater Western Sydney, Inner West, St George, as well as local surrounding suburbs. It is served by Transit Systems and U-Go Mobility. The majority of its bus services are operated outside the centre on Roseland Avenue. There is no railway station in Roselands; the nearest stations are located in Punchbowl or Narwee.

Roselands has multi-level car parks with 3,187 spaces.

== History ==
Construction of Roselands Shopping Centre began on 9 June 1964, on the site of the former Roselands Golf Course and previously the site of Belmore House and rose garden (which gave its name to the new centre, and later the surrounding suburb). Cost of construction at the time was A$15 million. The centre was developed by Grace Bros and designed by the Sydney-based firm of Whitehead & Payne.

Roselands was officially opened on 12 October 1965 by the newly-elected Premier of New South Wales, Sir Robert Askin, and at the time it was the largest shopping centre in the southern hemisphere, though it held this title for less than a year when Bankstown Square (now Bankstown Central) opened on 21 September 1966. The centre featured a four-level Grace Bros department store, a Coles Variety Store, a Coles New World store, a cinema known as Roselands Theatre Beautiful, and 87 speciality stores. Roselands was also known for having Australia's first "food court", known as "Four Corners" themed to represent food from the four corners of the world, a rain-themed water feature (the Raindrop Fountain) and a rose fountain. The centre also featured a rooftop entertainment zone known as The Carnival Top with a bandstand and mini-golf course.

A major incident occurred at 4.30pm on 13 June 1969. A large fire broke out in the Grace Bros store, causing millions of dollars' worth of damage before it was extinguished. The fire started on the top floor, which was a temporary structure to allow for further floors to be added later. There was a lot of timber in walls on the top floor, and most of it was storage and reserve areas, so that staff hardly ever used the floor.

An electrical fault in a pillar on the second floor in the soft furnishings department was apparently the fire's immediate cause. The fire itself, by the time it was extinguished, had spread up the conduit to the floor above, where the huge bedding department storeroom was located. When staffers and customers realised that the fire had spread upstairs, water in the sprinkler system had boiled and the fire was out of control. Most of the damage was caused by water seeping down through the concrete floors below. The fire was contained to the top floor, which was rendered useless. Next morning, the lower ground floor of Grace Bros was ankle-deep in dirty water, and as this was the electrical and major furnishings floor, everything was a total write-off. The clothing floors were also severely damaged by water, while the ceiling tiles all became saturated and collapsed onto the racks below, wetting and staining much of the clothing.

In 1977, Roselands made an application for re-zoning and expansion. There was considerable objection to the plans, although they were eventually approved in December 1978. This $14 million development was completed in September 1981 and included 2 levels of parking, Marketplace level food facility relocated up to the mall's Gallery level. The centre featured 122 stores and services.

A controlling interest in Grace Bros was acquired by Myer in June 1983. Myer was then acquired by Coles in August 1985.

In 1985, The Roselands Theatre Beautiful closed and the space taken over by Lincraft in 1986 until its closure in 2013 and was taken over by JB Hi-Fi. Target opened a prototype "new look" store on the space of Coles Variety Store on 25 September 1986.

Between March 1991 and August 1992 the centre underwent a development which saw the Marketplace level was reconfigured as a Food Hall and the addition of Franklins and Grace Bros downsized into 3 levels In 1994 level 2 fashion mall was refurbished.

In July 1998, as part of a joint venture between Centro Properties Group and Abu Dhabi Investment Council, the centre had been acquired by them. Roselands was renamed to Centro Roselands in 2004 as part of the deal.

In 1999, the centre underwent a $21 million refurbishment which added a new food court which was renamed Raindrop Foodcourt, new Skylights were installed and Level 2 was also remodeled and the centre's Raindrop and Rose fountain removed and replaced by speciality stores which the centre had reached 171 stores. The opening of this development was officially dedicated on 12 December 2000.

In 2001, Franklins closed and was replaced by Food For Less which operated until its closure in August 2018.

Centro Properties Group was restructured in 2011 due to financial difficulty and accounting irregularities. The successor entity, Federation Limited, rebranded the centre to Roselands in 2014.

Since the early 2000s, Roselands has been on the large-scale drawing board and was submitted in 2003 but was rejected. In October 2015 a $650 million plan was submitted which included and expansion of the southeast wing, taking over an existing parking area and cinema megaplex and leisure zone would be installed in the upper floor of the existing Myer store, with a new Myer being built. Roselands would also feature two new supermarkets, a new Target discount department store, a new Kmart store and two new multi-storey car parks. However in February 2017, this development was scrapped after Vicinity Centres was unable to strike a deal with Myer and the centre would undergo refurbishment in 2018.

In August 2018, Roselands underwent $90 million redevelopment as part of the first stage of the five-year refurbishment which features two new supermarkets and a new fresh food precinct. The lower ground floor features five new specialty areas, including a Market Hall, Market Place, Atrium, Laneway and Pantry, each offering a diverse range of fresh produce.

The $90 million redevelopment opened on 26 September 2019 and consists of:

- A brand new Aldi store on the space previously occupied by Dick Smith.
- A transformed Coles
- A new fresh food precinct
- A new full line Woolworths on the space previously occupied by Food For Less which opened on 30 October 2019 by Ed Halmagyi.

In June 2021, Target left and had rebranded to Kmart after 35 years.

In October 2021, JY Group purchased a 50% shareholding from Challenger.

In February 2026, it was announced that Myer would close its store on 31 July 2026, citing that they wanted "to ensure that [they] have the right store network." In addition to this, it was announced that a DA had been lodged for a multi-million dollar refurbishment and extension of the centre, including a 16,000 square metre international supermarket operator, alongside various national and international retailers.

== Tenants ==
Roselands Shopping Centre has 62,684sqm of floor space. The major retailers include Myer, Kmart, Aldi, Coles, Woolworths and JB Hi-Fi
