= East Hills railway line =

Railway line in Sydney, New South Wales, Australia

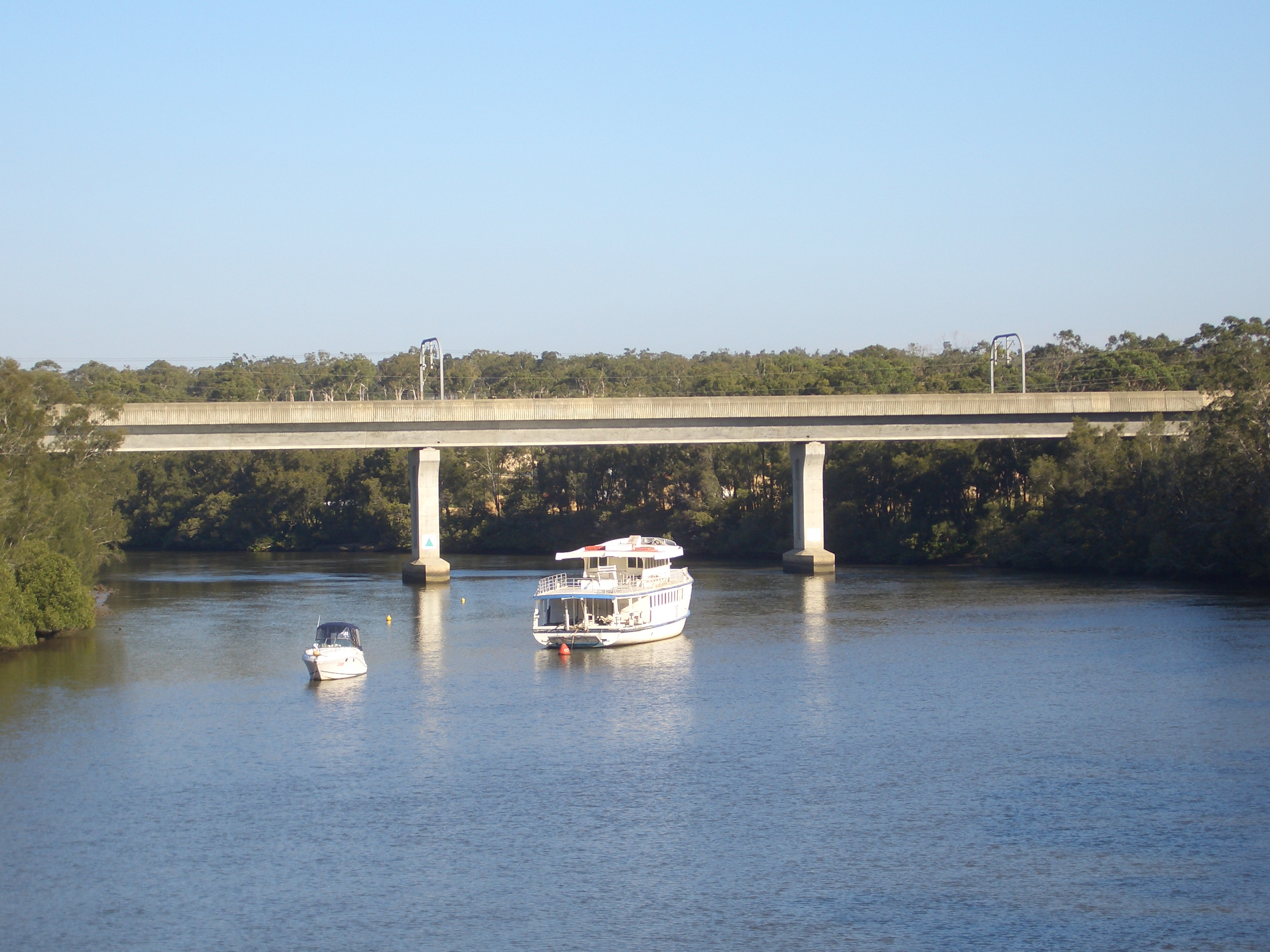
- Rail bridge over the Georges River at East Hills

Technical
- Track gauge: 4 ft 8 1/2 in (1,435 mm)
- Operating speed: 125 km/h (80 mph) (operational) 160 km/h (100 mph) (design)

The East Hills railway line serves the southern and south-western suburbs of Sydney, Australia. The line opened to East Hills in 1931 and was extended to connect to the Main South Line in 1987. Most services along the line form part of the Airport & South Line operated by Sydney Trains.

== Alignment ==
The East Hills line branches from the Illawarra Line at Wolli Creek Junction, between Tempe and Arncliffe railway stations. From Wolli Creek, the line heads west towards East Hills, where the alignment is within 2 km of the since-constructed M5 South Western Motorway. It then turns south-west through the new suburbs of Voyager Point and Wattle Grove to meet the Main South line at Glenfield Junction. The line is four tracks between Wolli Creek junction and Revesby station, then two tracks to Glenfield junction. The bridge over the Georges River at East Hills, opened in 1987, is the only significant engineering structure on the line.

== History ==
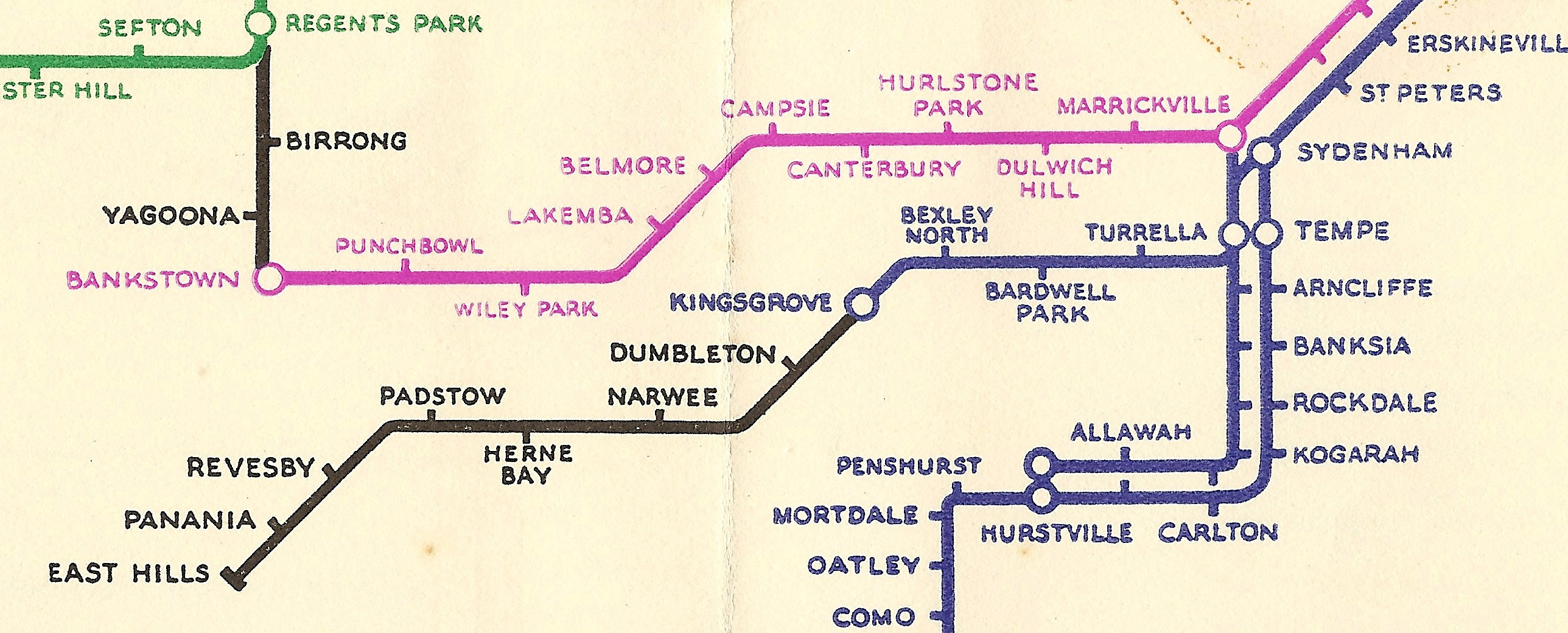
Map of the East Hills Line from 1939 showing the limit of electrification at Kingsgrove, and the former station names Dumbleton and Herne Bay.

Proposals for a line to East Hills were first raised after World War 1 as an extension of the existing line at Bankstown. In 1923, the Railway Department put forward a proposal for a railway from Tempe to Salt Pan Creek to serve the growing town of Dumbleton (later known as Beverly Hills). Residents west of Salt Pan Creek petitioned the government to extend the line to East Hills.

The New South Wales Public Works Committee approved of construction of a railway from Tempe to East Hills in August 1924 and the bill for construction of the line passed both Houses of the state Parliament in late 1924. A ceremony at Padstow Park commemorating the turning of the first sod by the then-Premier of New South Wales Jack Lang was held in September 1927.

The initial line was to be double track between Tempe and Kingsgrove and single track beyond, although earthworks were to allow future easy duplication of the entire route. Electrification was also to end at Kingsgrove. Construction began in 1927 with the employment of 400 workers, and most of the earthworks were completed in by 1930. Station names were announced in November 1929. They were largely the same as those used today with the exception of Dumbleton (present-day Beverly Hills) and Herne Bay (present-day Riverwood).

The first section to Kingsgrove opened on 21 September 1931 as an electrified double track line from Wolli Creek Junction on the Illawarra Line to Kingsgrove.

The second section, a single-track non-electrified extension to East Hills, was opened on 19 December 1931 by the then-Minister for Local Government James McGirr in a ceremony at East Hills. Points to reverse trains were provided at Kingsgrove, and a passing loop was provided at Herne Bay. This section was electrified on 17 December 1939.

In the post war period of the 1940s and 1950s migrant hostels and housing commission estates were developed in suburbs along the line. The line was duplicated between Kingsgrove and Riverwood in 1948, with points for terminating trains provided at both stations, and a passing loop at Revesby was opened in 1956.

=== A major link for south west Sydney ===
In 1983, work commenced on a duplication from Padstow to Revesby, with a view to eventually making the entire line through to East Hills double track.

In 1985, the line was duplicated through to East Hills and on 21 December 1987 extended to Glenfield to connect with the Main South Line, allowing through services to and from Campbelltown. A new station was provided at Holsworthy, and East Hills station was rebuilt with the addition of a third platform. The remainder of the East Hills line from Turrella to Panania is the only line in Sydney with all platform buildings extant from its original construction phase (though some have been altered).

The new track & alignment was designed for 160km/h train running between Glenfield & Panania, this work was undertaken in conjunction with track strengthening & slewing works along the branch line up to Wolli Creek. When services commenced on 21 December 1987, there were only limited services from Campbelltown via East Hills during peak hours only; however, in 1988 an all day half-hourly service was provided. Local (all stations) services generally ran every 15 minutes from East Hills.

The flat junction at Glenfield incorporated the use of 1 in 21 medium speed turnouts (with swing nose crossings) capable of diverging speeds at 80 km/h (Normal trains) & 100 km/h (XPT trains) & were the fastest in Australia at that time. Track speeds along this line were significantly lowered from 160 km/h to 115 km/h due to signalling deficiencies (related to emergency trip-braking at high speeds) being discovered in 2007 by CityRail engineers.

=== East Hills Track Amplification ===
In 2002, a section of the East Hills Line between Wolli Creek Junction and Kingsgrove was quadruplicated, allowing express trains to overtake local trains in this area.

=== Rail Clearways ===
An additional platform and turn-back track was completed at Revesby as part of the Rail Clearways Program. From October 2009 it replaced East Hills as the primary turn-back point for local all-stations services on the line.

A second Rail Clearways project involved quadruplicating the section of track between Kingsgrove and Revesby. This enables express services between the Campbelltown area and the city to operate separately from local services between Revesby and the city. The new tracks opened on 15 April 2013. Regional trains heading southwest to Canberra, Melbourne and Griffith from Sydney Central began to use the East Hills line to travel through metropolitan Sydney, instead of the Main Southern railway line through Strathfield railway station.

=== Rail Services Improvement Program ===
Formerly called More Trains, More Services (MTMS), the program comprises a number of projects across the Sydney Trains network to increase reliability.

As part of this, in 2022, two crossovers at the former end of quadruplication at Beverly Hills were removed.

== Services ==
The line is currently used by the following services:

- T8 Airport & South Line
- Southern Highlands Line
- NSW TrainLink Southern Region Line
