= East Hills railway station =

Railway station in Sydney, New South Wales, Australia

East Hills
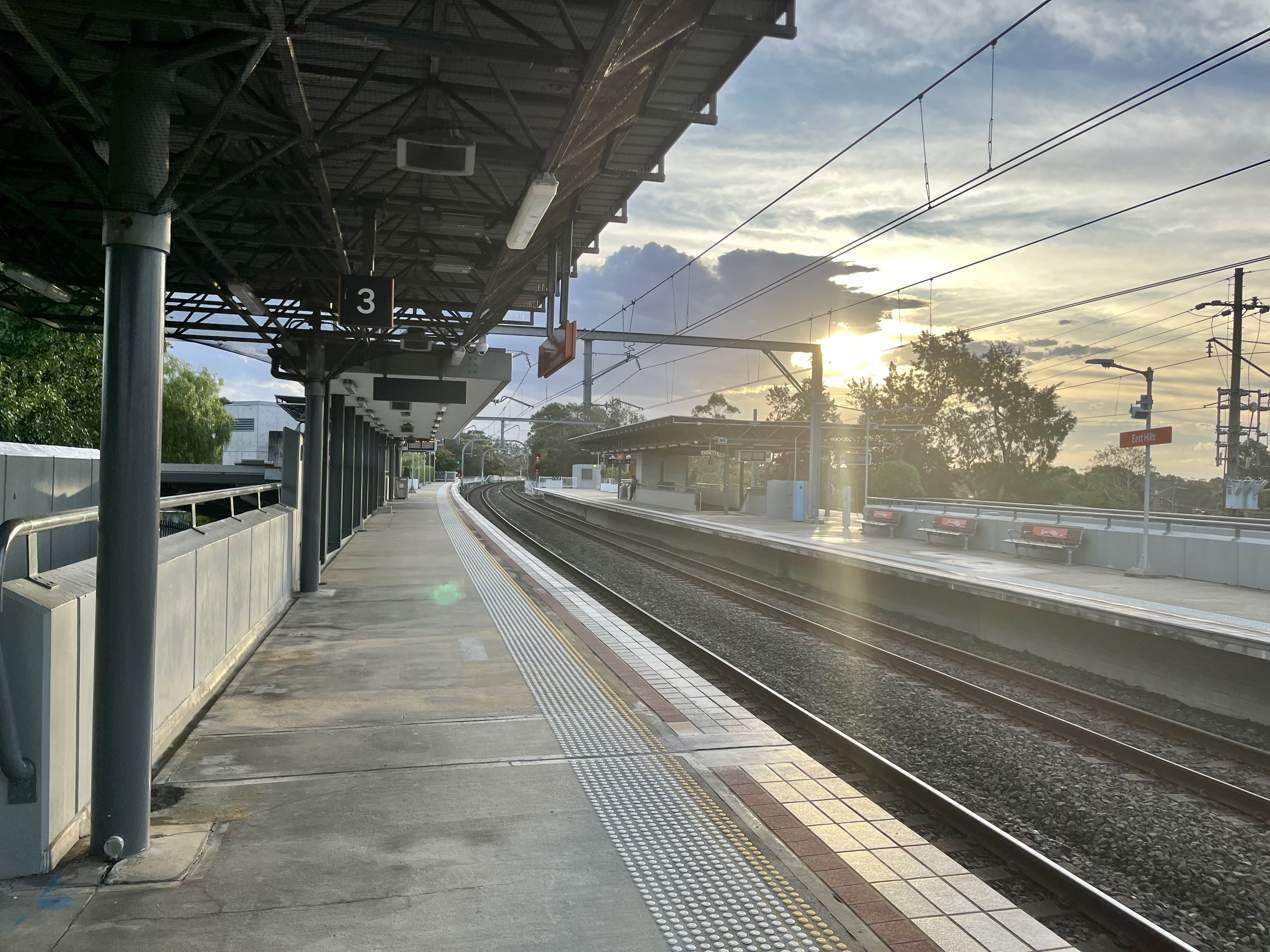
- Southbound view from Platform 3, December 2023

General information
- Location: Park Road, East Hills
- Coordinates: 33°57′41″S 150°59′06″E
- Elevation: 14 metres (46 ft)
- Owner: Transport Asset Manager of New South Wales
- Operator: Sydney Trains
- Line: East Hills
- Distance: 22.2 kilometres (13.8 mi) from Central
- Platforms: 3 (1 island, 1 side)
- Tracks: 3
- Connections: Bus

Construction
- Structure type: Elevated
- Accessible: Yes

Other information
- Status: Staffed
- Station code: EHS
- Website: Transport for NSW

History
- Opened: 21 December 1931
- Rebuilt: August 1987

Passengers
- 2025: 452,279 (year); 1,239 (daily) (Sydney Train)
- Rank: 167

Services
Preceding station	Sydney Trains	Following station
Holsworthy towards Macarthur	Airport & South Line	Panania towards City Circle
Location

East Hills railway station is located on the East Hills line, serving the Sydney suburb of East Hills. It is served by Sydney Trains' T8 Airport & South Line services.

== History ==
East Hills station opened on 21 December 1931 when the line was extended from Kingsgrove. It served as the terminus of the line until it was extended to Glenfield on 21 December 1987.

A new station was built south-east of the original station as part of the extension opening in August 1987 with the original station closed and demolished. Following the extension, East Hills became the main intermediate terminus and an interchange point between all stops and limited stops trains. In addition to the two through tracks (platforms 2 and 3), a side terminating track (platform 1) was provided. A new centre turnback at Revesby opened in 2009 as part of the Rail Clearways Program, which ended East Hills' role as the primary intermediate terminus.

The station was upgraded and received lifts in April 2022.

== Platforms and services ==
Platform	Line	Stopping pattern	Notes
1	Airport & South Line	One weekday afternoon terminating service	
2	Airport & South Line	services to Central & the City Circle via the Airport; 7 weekday morning peak services to Central & the City Circle via Sydenham	
3	Airport & South Line	services to Macarthur; 6 weekday evening peak services to Campbelltown	

== Transport links ==
Transit Systems NSW operates one bus route via East Hills station, under contract to Transport for NSW:

- 925: to Lidcombe station

U-Go Mobility operates three bus routes via East Hills station, under contract to Transport for NSW:

- 922: to Bankstown Central via Milperra
- 924: to Bankstown Central via Revesby
- 962: to Westfield Miranda

East Hills station is served by one NightRide route:

- N40: to Town Hall station

== Trackplan ==
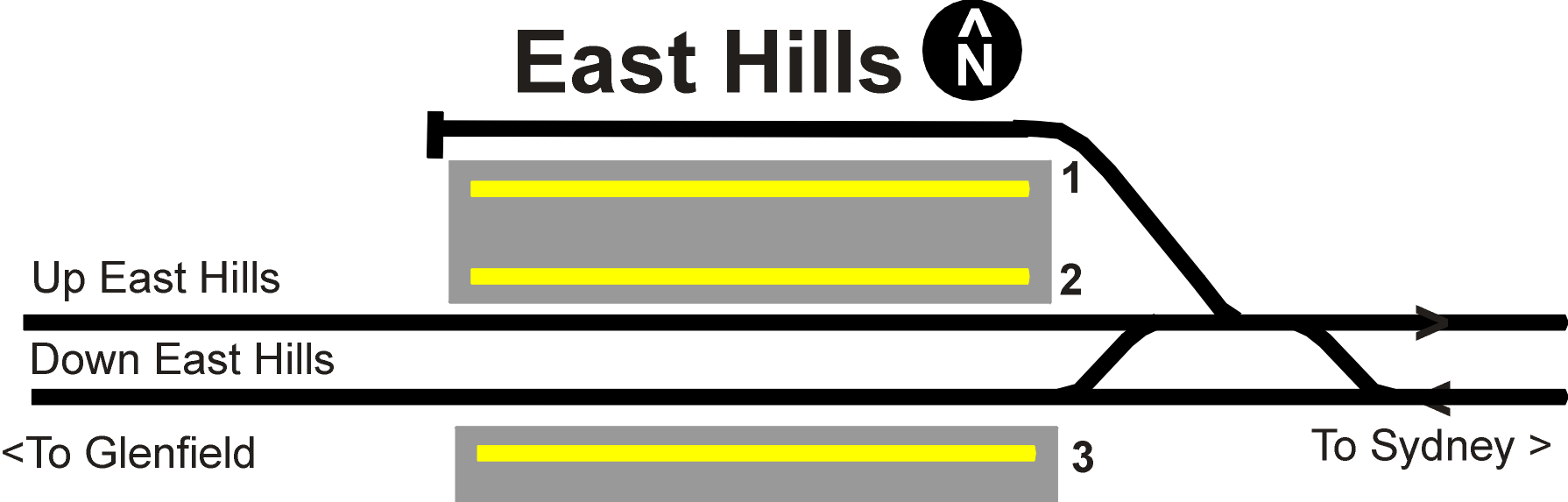
Track layout

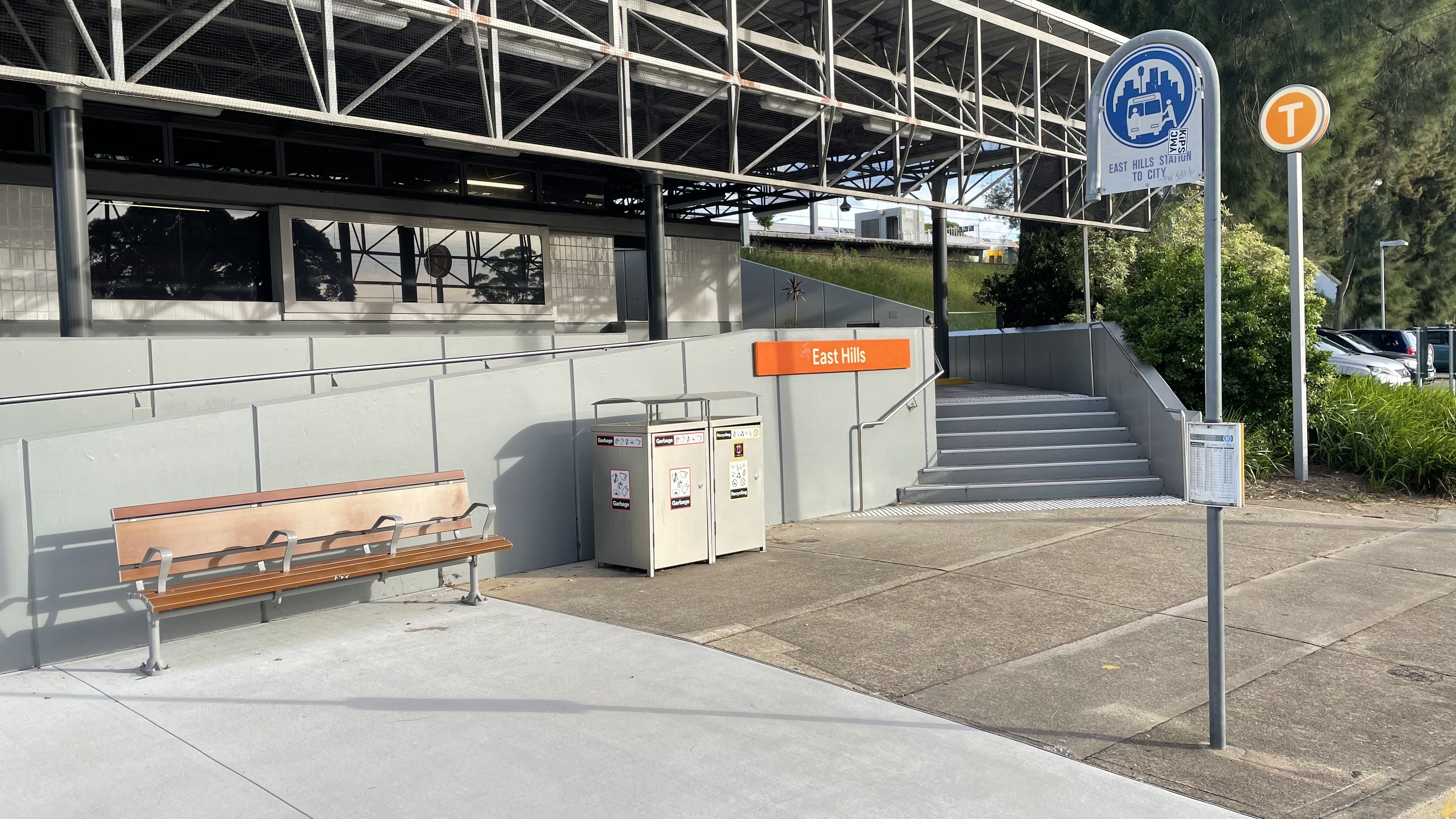
Main entrance and bus stop

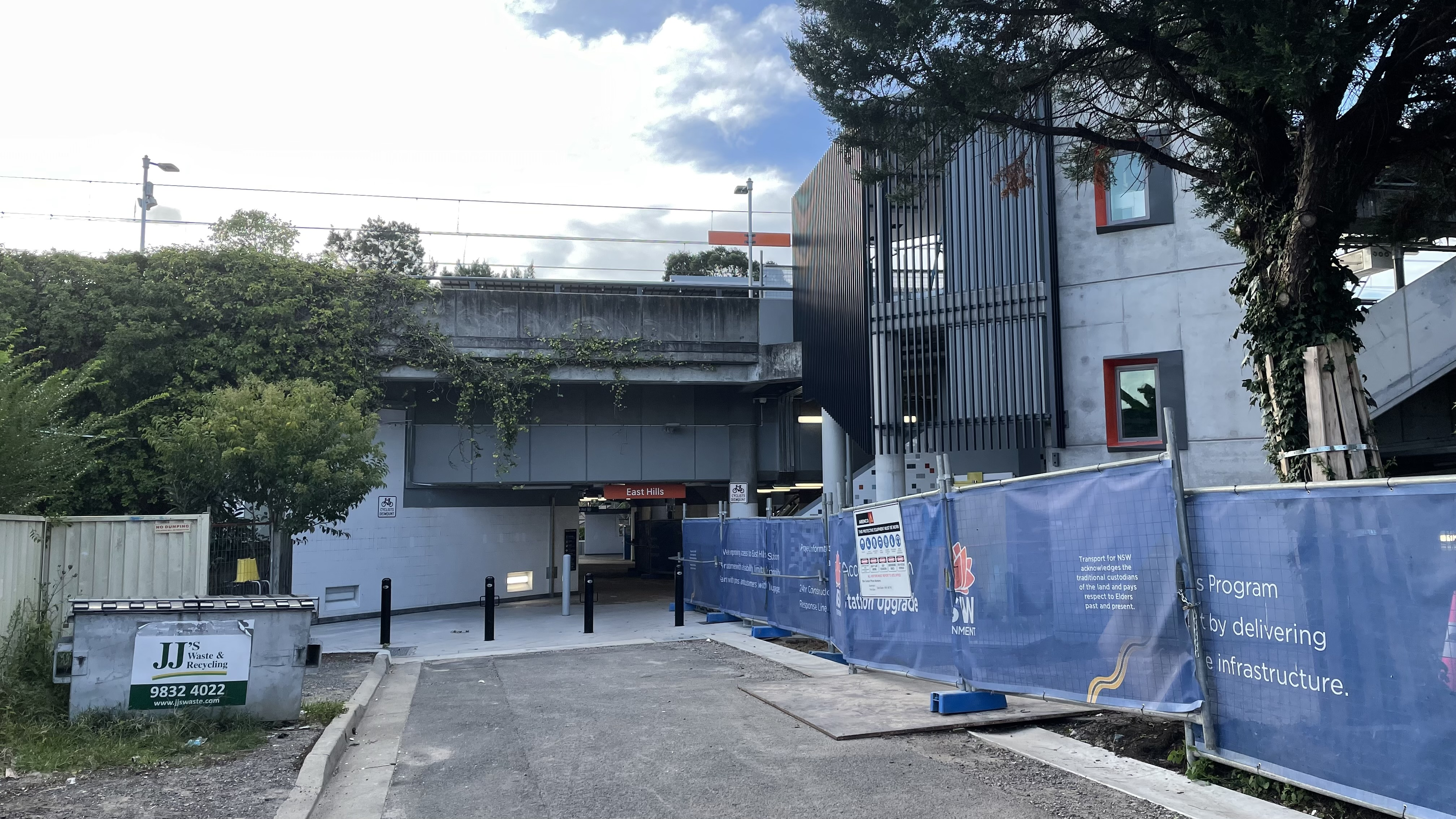
Broe Avenue entrance

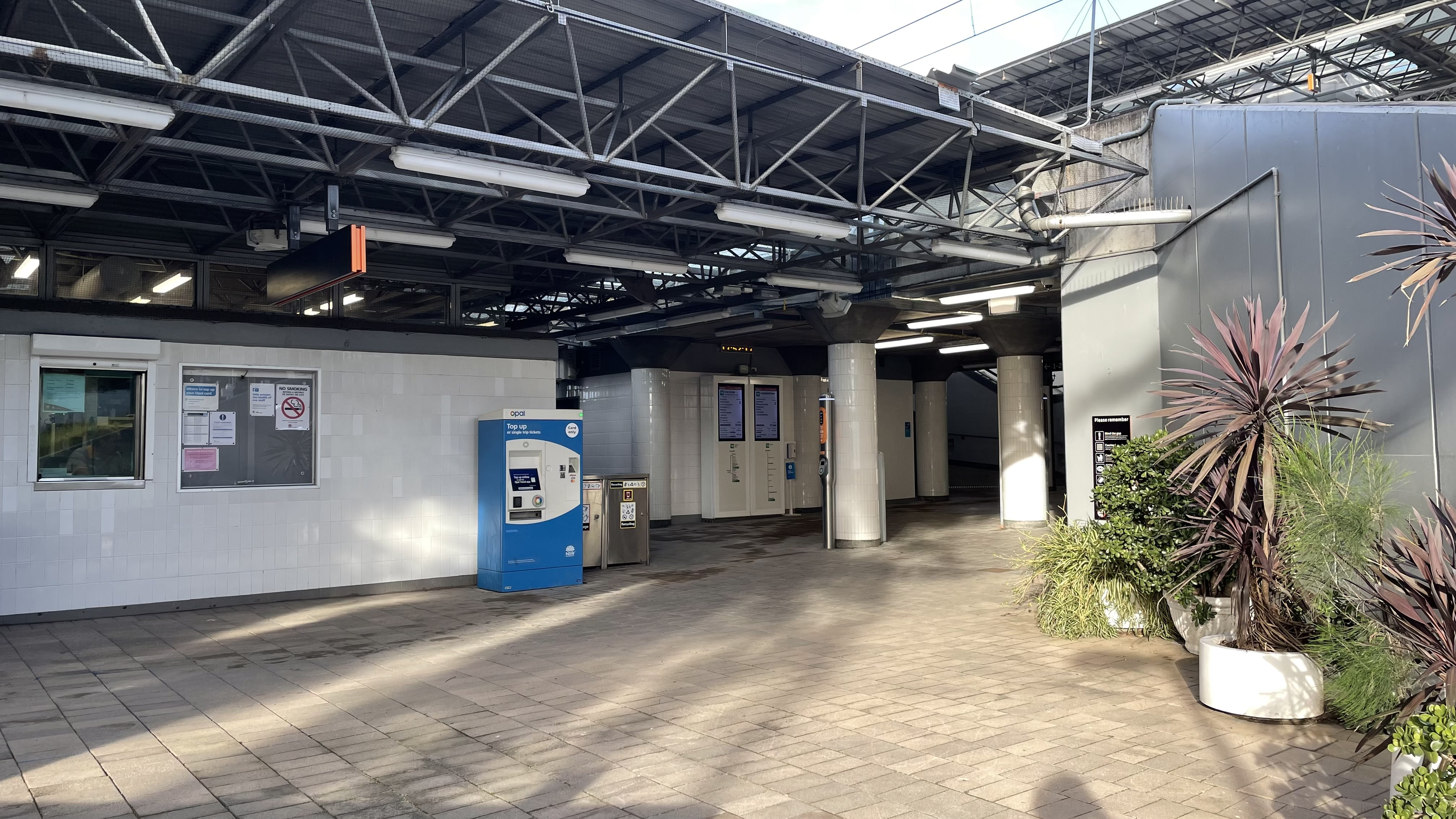
Concourse

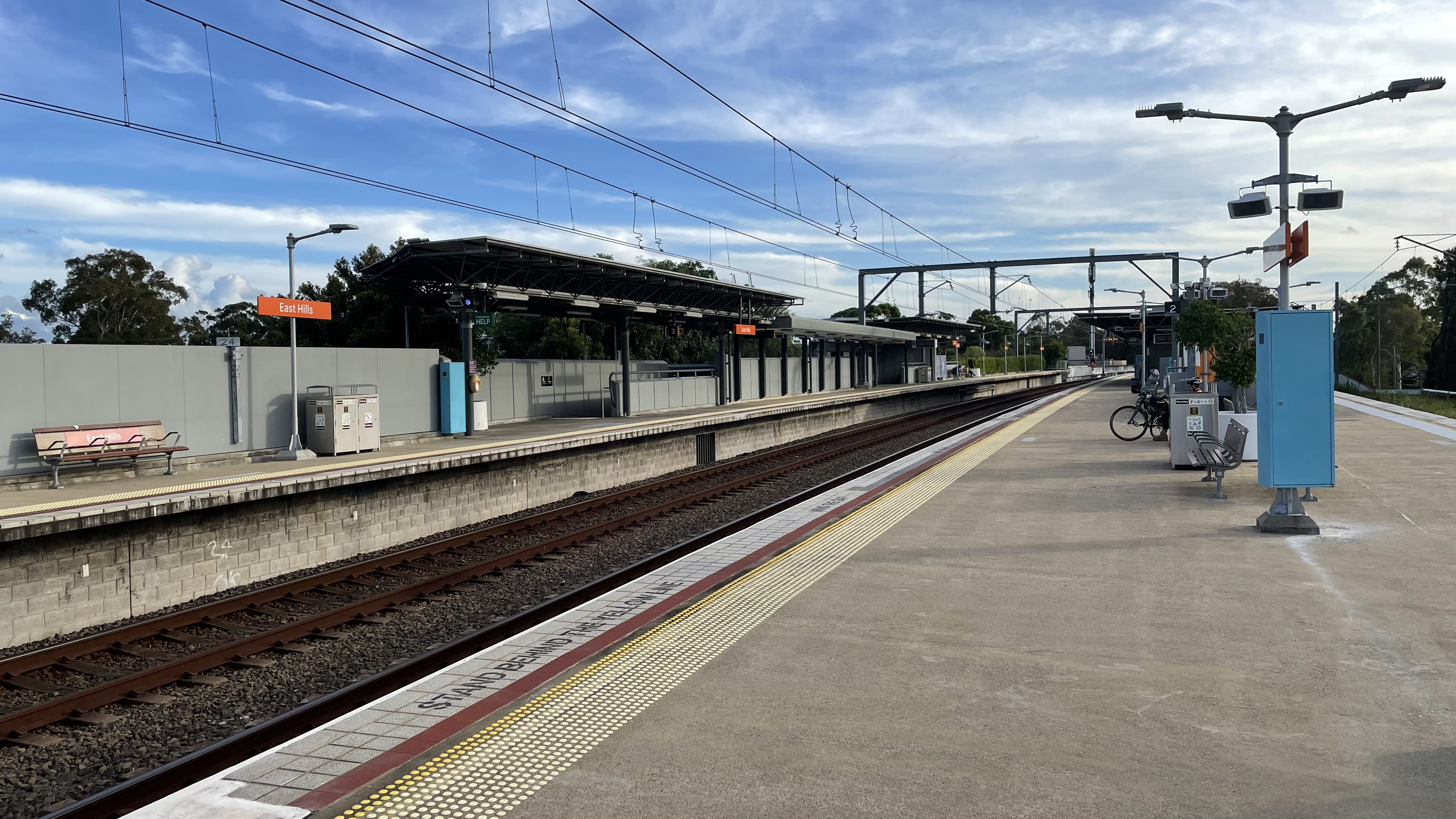
Platforms
