= Revesby railway station =

Railway station in Sydney, New South Wales, Australia

Revesby
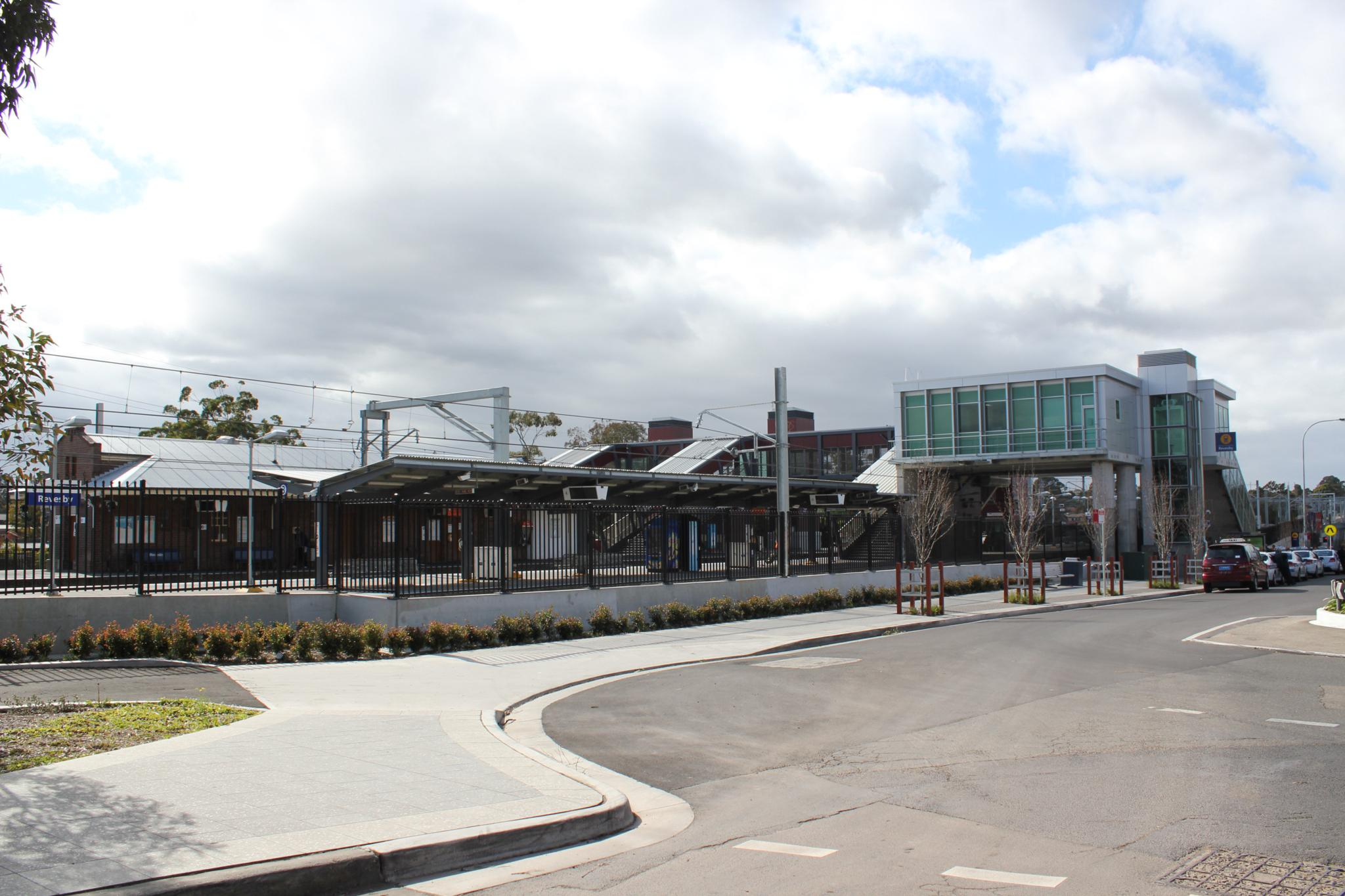
- Southbound view of the station entrance, building and platform, December 2012

General information
- Location: Blamey Street, Revesby
- Coordinates: 33°57′09″S 151°00′53″E
- Elevation: 17 metres (56 ft)
- Owner: Transport Asset Manager of New South Wales
- Operator: Sydney Trains
- Line: East Hills
- Distance: 20.96 kilometres (13.02 mi) from Central
- Platforms: 4 (2 island)
- Tracks: 4
- Connections: Bus

Construction
- Structure type: Ground
- Accessible: Yes

Other information
- Status: Weekdays: Staffed: 6am to 10pm: Weekends and public holidays: Staffed: 6am to 10pm
- Station code: RSY
- Website: Transport for NSW

History
- Opened: 21 December 1931
- Rebuilt: April 2013

Passengers
- 2025: 2,911,856 (year); 7,978 (daily) (Sydney Trains)
- Rank: 59

Services
Preceding station	Sydney Trains	Following station
Terminus	Airport & South Line Local via Airport	Padstow towards City Circle
Panania towards Macarthur	Airport & South Line Early morning, late night via Airport	Padstow towards City Circle
Panania towards Macarthur	Airport & South Line Express via Airport	Wolli Creek towards City Circle
Panania towards Campbelltown	Airport & South Line Peak hour via Sydenham	Sydenham towards City Circle
Location

Revesby railway station is a heritage-listed railway station located on the East Hills line, serving the Sydney suburb of Revesby. It is served by Sydney Trains' T8 Airport & South Line services.

== History ==
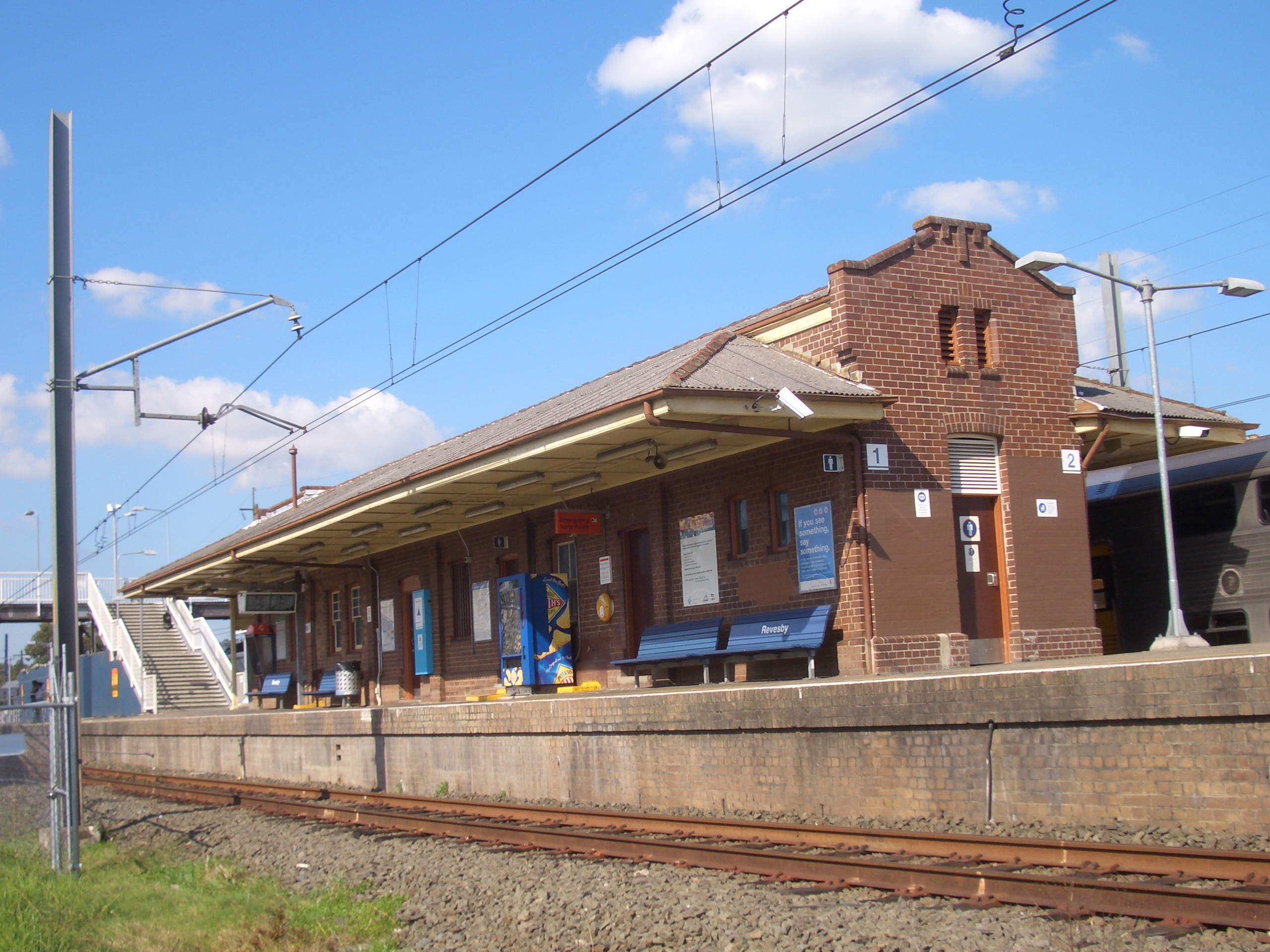
Eastbound view of Platform 1 in April 2007

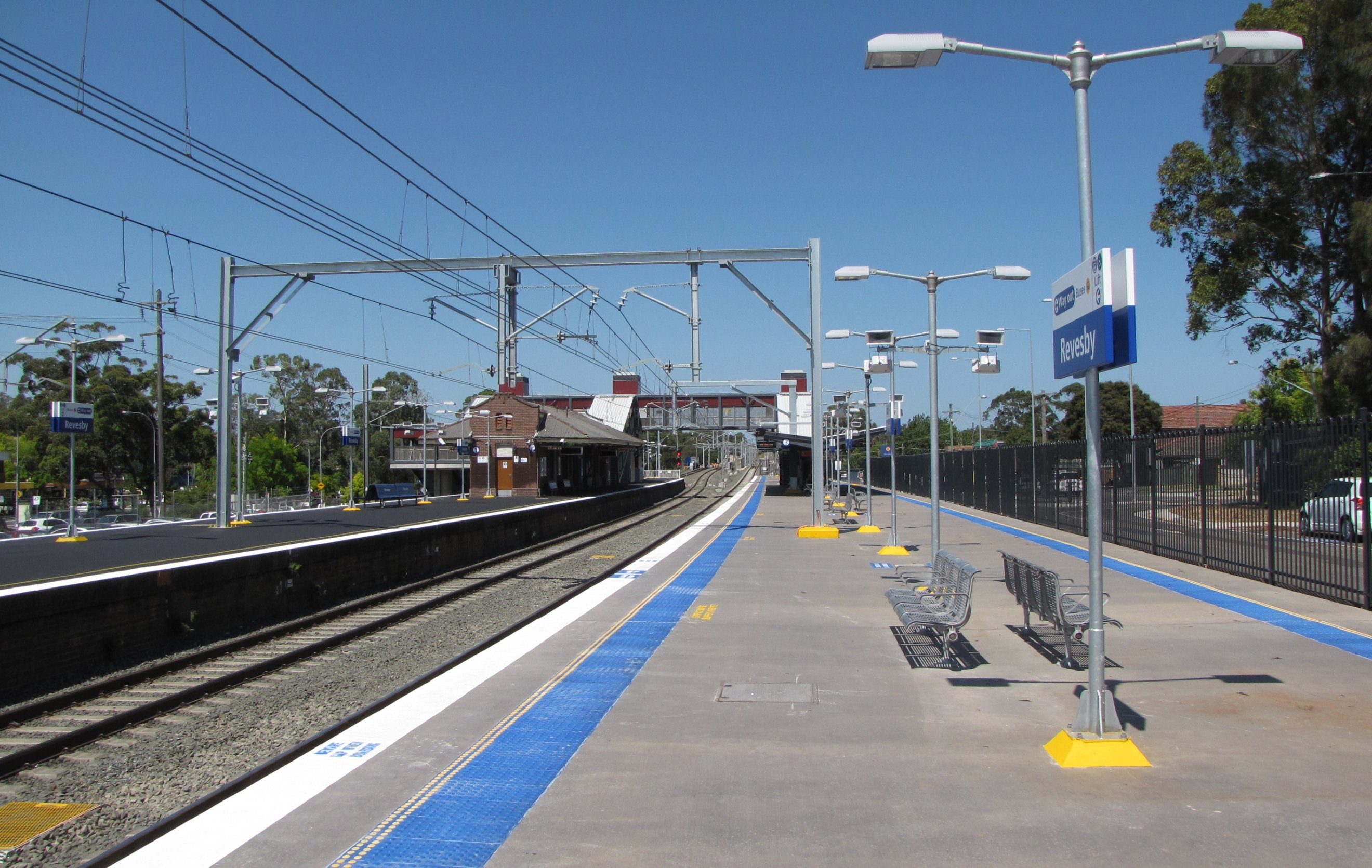
Eastbound view in January 2009 from new Platform 3, before the addition of Platform 4 to the right

Revesby station opened on 21 December 1931 when the line was extended from Kingsgrove to East Hills. In 1956 a crossing loop was opened.

On 9 December 1985, the line from Revesby to East Hills was duplicated with a new track laid to the north of the existing one. The line from Kingsgrove to Revesby was duplicated around the same time.

The Rail Clearways Program saw the station's role change significantly, with plans to considerably boost capacity of the East Hills line by creating two centre turnbacks at the station to replace a side turnback at East Hills, and quadruplicating the line from Kingsgrove to Revesby.

In 2006, construction commenced on a second island platform and a replacement footbridge. Platform 3 opened in December 2008, as the main platform to the west. The existing Platform 2 became a centre turnback with only a few services initially using the facility. In October 2009, a new timetable was introduced, and Revesby replaced East Hills as the major intermediate terminus.

In April 2013, as part of the quadruplication of the line from Kingsgrove to Revesby, Platform 4 opened.

== Platforms and services ==
Platform	Line	Stopping pattern	Notes
1	Airport & South Line	services to Central & the City Circle via the Airport; 13 weekday morning peak services to Central & the City Circle via Sydenham	limited all stations services to City Circle via Airport
2	Airport & South Line	terminating services to & from Central & the City Circle via the Airport	
3	Airport & South Line	terminating services to & from Central & the City Circle via the Airport and late night Macarthur via Glenfield services	
4	Airport & South Line	services to Macarthur; 8 weekday evening peak services to Campbelltown	

== Transport links ==
U-Go Mobility operates five bus routes via Revesby station, under contract to Transport for NSW:

- 923: Bankstown Central to Panania
- 924: Bankstown Central to East Hills station
- 926: Bankstown Central to Revesby Heights
- 962: East Hills station to Miranda

Transit Systems operates one bus route from Revesby station, under contract to Transport for NSW:

- 928: to Milperra

Revesby station is served by one NightRide route:

- N40: East Hills station to Town Hall station

== Trackplan ==
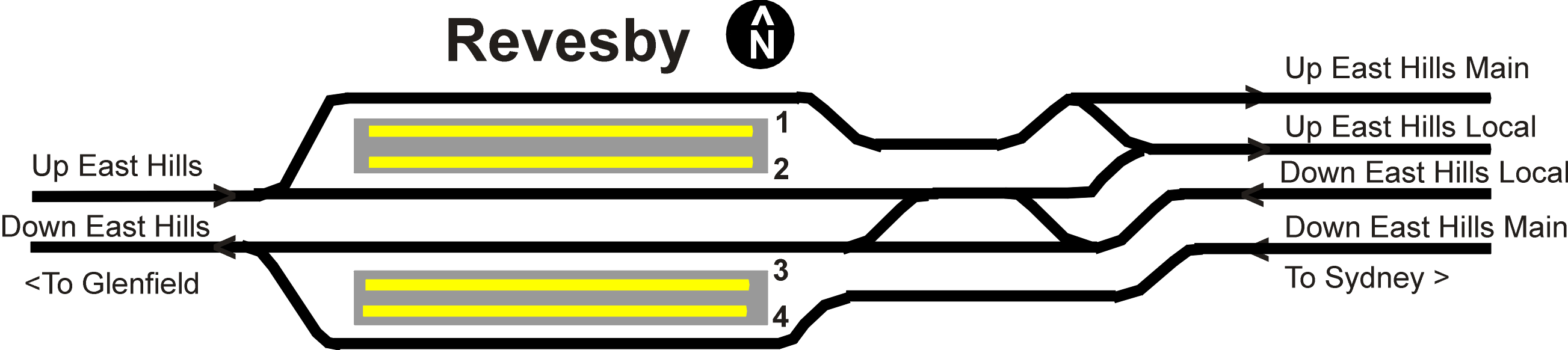
Track layout after completion of Platform 4
