= 2017–18 Australian bushfire season =

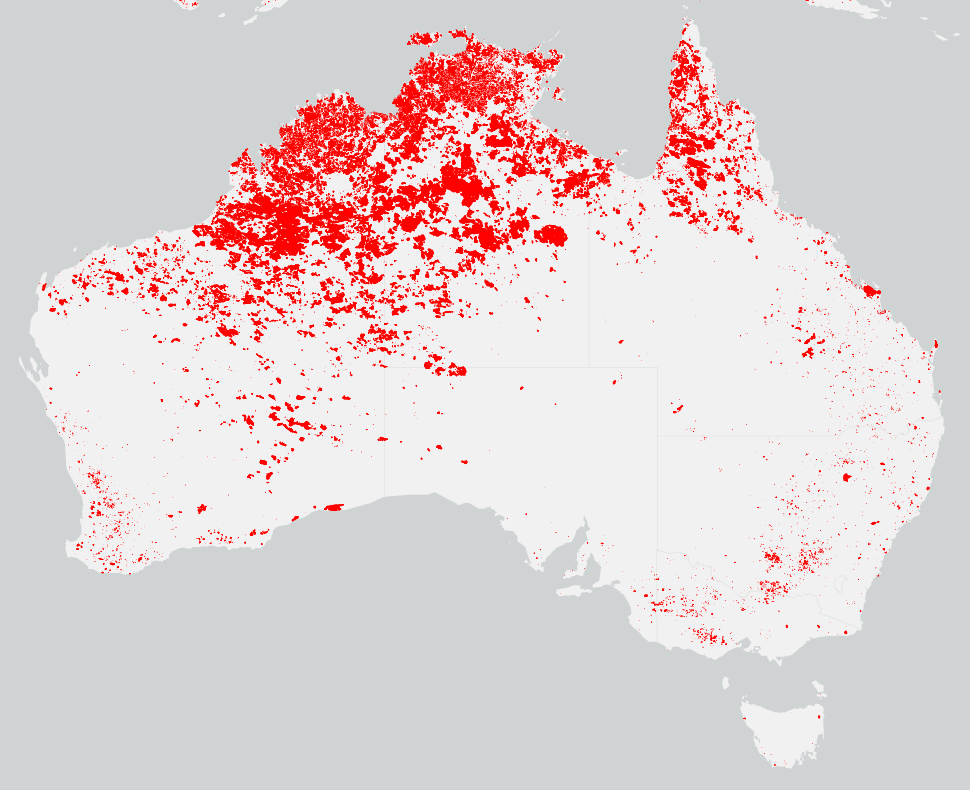
- NASA MODIS burned area detections from June 2017 to May 2018
- Date: June 2017 – June 2018
- Location: Australia

Impacts
- Deaths: 0
- Structures destroyed: 94+

The bushfire season of the summer of 2017–18, was expected to have above normal bushfire risks with an elevated fire risk for the most of eastern and south Australian coastal areas. Australia had experienced its warmest winter on record and the ninth driest winter on record leaving dry fuel loads across much of southern Australia. Expected warmer weather over the summer period would also increase the risk. Bushfires were also expected to occur earlier, before the end of winter, as a result of the warm and dry winter. Both Queensland and north-eastern New South Wales experienced the wettest October since 1975 leading to a downgrade in bushfire risk.

== Fires by state or territory ==
=== New South Wales ===
September

Two homes were lost in Comboyne in a fire that was battled by 100 fire fighters and 30 units. A shed a vehicle were also lost in a fire near Kempsey.

Sydney had its hottest September day on record with a temperature of 33.8 °C (92.8 °F) on 12 September and the first total fire ban for the season was issued. Fires broke out in the Hunter Valley quickly engulfing 400 hectares (988 acres), with 75 other fires burning around the state.

March

On 18 March, a bushfire that began in Reedy Swamp spread east to the town of Tathra, on the NSW South Coast. Around 150 firefighters worked to control the blaze, which destroyed or damaged approximately 70 homes. 300 people spent the night at an evacuation centre at the Bega Showgrounds, and by midday on 19 March, in excess of 1,000 hectares (2,500 acres) of land was burnt. Around midday on 19 March, there was still no public access to Tathra, and four local schools were closed due to the impact on staff and students. By the afternoon of the same day, the New South Wales Rural Fire Service confirmed that 69 homes and buildings, and an additional 30 caravans and cabins were destroyed, 39 buildings were damaged and 398 homes were saved. The RFS estimated the total number of buildings destroyed was 'seventy-plus'. It is understood that the fire was caused by a failure in electrical infrastructure.

April

Due to strong westerly winds and unseasonably warm weather, a bushfire, described as "ferocious", began in southwestern Sydney on 15 April, in Glenfield, where it eventually spread to Casula, Moorebank, Holsworthy, New South Wales, Wattle Grove and Menai, and towards the southeast, with Heathcote Road eventually being closed. Over 500 firefighters and 15 aircraft worked to fight the blaze. Inhabitants in Holsworthy, Voyager Point, Pleasure Point and Sandy Point were told to seek shelter from the fire's blistering heat as "it is too late to leave", the New South Wales Rural Fire Service informed. Hundreds of residents were evacuated after the fire moved swiftly to the properties at Holsworthy and Wattle Grove, as well as towards Holsworthy Barracks. Ember attack also affected residents in the Illawong, Bangor, Picnic Point and Como.

Prime Minister Malcolm Turnbull visited the Rural Fire Service centre in Sutherland on Sunday afternoon as authorities reported some properties in Menai may have been affected. Turnbull stated, "Clearly with the wind increasing in strength the situation is worsening but there are outstanding efforts to control this fire being undertaken". Earlier that day, firefighters stated the wind would hinder their endeavours to put out the large fire, which began in Casula. "The combination of so much active fire on the ground, coupled with this forecast of very strong winds is the overlying challenge," Rural Fire Service Commissioner Shane Fitzsimmons said. Police have set up a crime scene and are finding out if the "fast-moving" bushfires burning out-of-control in southern Sydney were deliberately lit. The RFS commissioner, Shane Fitzsimmons, concluded that even though there had still been no property damage or serious injury from the fiery blaze, the “volatile, dynamic, and dangerous” fire was posing a stern challenge for the 500 firefighter.

=== Victoria ===
March

On 19 March windy and dry conditions across Victoria led to over 160 grassfires and bushfires. A fire near Terang reached over 6,700 hectares (17,000 acres), one in Gnotuk-Camperdown approximately 200 hectares (490 acres), and in Garvoc approximately 4,000 hectares (9,900 acres). There were at least 18 houses lost in the fires. The Terang fire was declared under control on 20 March.

=== Queensland ===
August

Three homes were destroyed by a fire in Noosa North Shore and another two damaged. Another fire in Caloundra burned out 700 hectares (1,730 acres) of bush and farmland and threatened Corbould Racecourse.

November

A fire on 6 November in a National Park near Bells Creek burned out 12 hectares (30 acres) of forest before being brought under control. Another fire on the same day near Landsborough needed 30 trucks to control a fire that burned over 180 hectares (445 acres) of forest and threatened Australia Zoo.

=== Western Australia ===
January

On 14 January a large fire south of Sawyers Valley burnt through approximately 1,000 hectares (2,500 acres) jumping the Mundaring Weir. The smoke covered most of the Perth metro region.

On 29 January a fire started just outside of the Augusta townsite in the Shire of Augusta-Margaret River. The fire moved rapidly on both sides of the Bussell Highway. An emergency warning was issued for the area. Multiple sheds and one derelict house were destroyed.

At midnight on 30 January a fire started in the Perth Hills suburb of Gidgegannup. A warning was issued and was upgraded an hour later. A few hours later a fire started in Kings Park at one stage threatening homes in Shenton Park.

February

On 1 February an emergency warning was issued for Elleker in the City of Albany. The fire was contained a few hours later.

May

Albany was menaced by 30 active fires late in May. One of the fires burned about 10 km (6.2 mi) west of Albany around Redmond and another burned about 20 km (12 mi) north west of Albany around Porongurup and Napier. At least one home was lost to fire near Wellstead in a fire that burned out an area of 4,000 ha (9,900 acres), the Porongurup fire lost an area of 17,000 ha (42,000 acres).

== See also ==
- List of Australian bushfire seasons
