= Panania railway station =

Railway station in Sydney, New South Wales, Australia

Panania
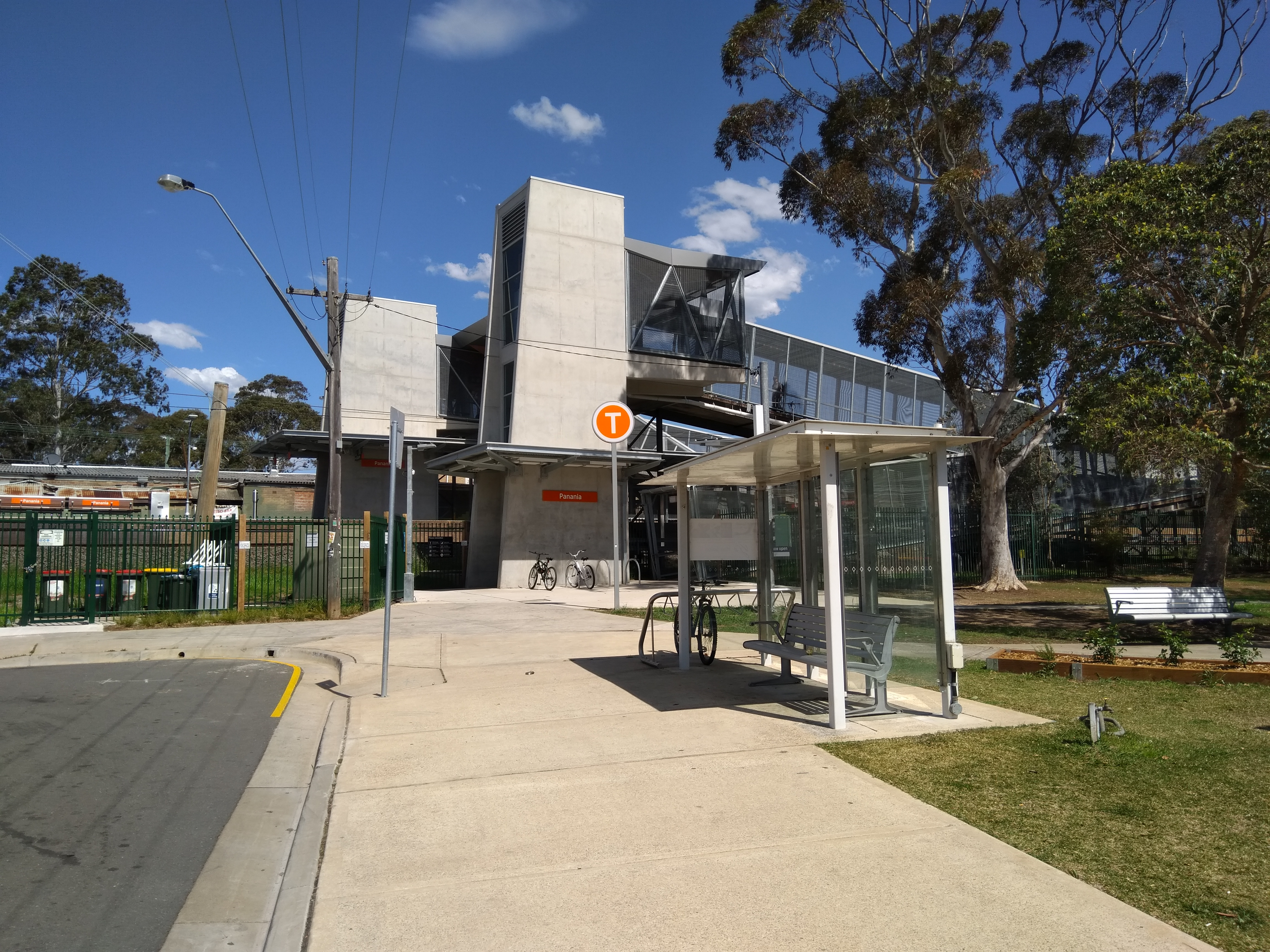
- Station entrance and building, September 2018

General information
- Location: Weston Street, Panania
- Coordinates: 33°57′16″S 150°59′52″E
- Elevation: 20 metres (66 ft)
- Owner: Transport Asset Manager of New South Wales
- Operator: Sydney Trains
- Line: East Hills
- Distance: 22.55 kilometres (14.01 mi) from Central
- Platforms: 2 (1 island)
- Tracks: 2
- Connections: Bus

Construction
- Structure type: Ground
- Accessible: Yes

Other information
- Status: Weekdays: Staffed: 6am to 7pm: Weekends and public holidays: Staffed: 8am to 4pm
- Station code: PAN
- Website: Transport for NSW

History
- Opened: 21 December 1931

Passengers
- 2025: 821,880 (year); 2,252 (daily) (Sydney Trains)
- Rank: 136

Services
Preceding station	Sydney Trains	Following station
East Hills towards Macarthur	Airport & South Line	Revesby towards City Circle
Location

Panania railway station is a heritage-listed railway station located on the East Hills line, serving the Sydney suburb of Panania. It is served by Sydney Trains' T8 Airport & South Line services.

== History ==
Panania station opened on 21 December 1931 when the line was extended from Kingsgrove to East Hills.

On 9 December 1985, the line from Revesby to East Hills was duplicated with a new track laid to the north of the existing one.

In 2018, the station received an upgrade including lifts.

== Upgrades ==
In October 2011, the surrounding bus stops and station entrance were upgraded. In December 2014, scoping began for a further upgrade. In July 2018, the upgrade was completed which included new lifts, stairs, weather canopies, signage, refurbishments, toilets, and CCTV.

== Platforms and services ==
Platform	Line	Stopping pattern	Notes
1	Airport & South Line	services to Central & the City Circle via the Airport; 7 weekday morning peak services to Central & the City Circle via Sydenham	
2	Airport & South Line	services to Macarthur; 4 weekday evening peak services to Campbelltown	

== Transport links ==
Panania Station has bus stops located on both Braesmere Road on the north side and Anderson Avenue and Weston Street on the south side of the station. All routes are operated by Transit Systems NSW and U-Go Mobility.

U-Go Mobility operates two bus routes via Panania station, under contract to Transport for NSW:

- 923: to Bankstown via Picnic Point
- 924: East Hills to Bankstown

Transit Systems NSW operates two bus routes via Panania station, under contract to Transport for NSW:

- 925: East Hills to Lidcombe via Bankstown
- 928: Revesby to Milperra

Panania station is served by one NightRide route.

- N40: East Hills to Town Hall station
