= McVicar's Bus Services =

Bus operator in Sydney, Australia

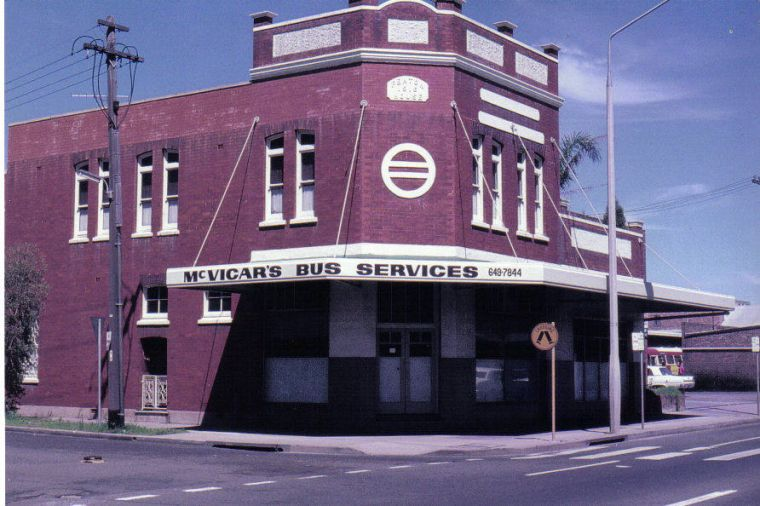
- Depot in Lidcombe
- Parent: McVicar family
- Commenced operation: 1919
- Ceased operation: 1978
- Headquarters: Lidcombe

McVicar's Bus Services was an Australian bus operator that operated services in the south-west suburbs of Sydney from 1919 until 1978.

== Company history ==
McVicar's Bus Service was founded in 1929 when Archibald Robert Brownlow McVicar began a bus service from Lidcombe railway station to Berala. McVicar extended the service to Regents Park and gained permission to run from Lidcombe to the Lidcombe State Hospital on Sunday afternoons: there was considerable business for bus operators running to hospitals and cemeteries on Sundays. In 1923 McVicar's weekly service to the hospital was increased to a daily frequency. In 1925, McVicar was given permission to operate a bus service between Cabramatta and Bankstown. In 1926, McVicar was granted approval to continue using solid tyres instead of pneumatic tyres.

By 1927 McVicar was operating from Bankstown to the Milperra Soldiers' Settlement as well as Picnic Point, East Hills and Panania. In 1930 McVicar's began running between Bankstown and Burwood. A depot was developed on the corner of James and Joseph Streets, Lidcombe, and in 1935 Arch was joined by his son, Arch McVicar Junior, as an apprentice mechanic and in that year the first diesel engine bus was acquired for the firm.

World War II saw the firm restricting the number of vehicles to 12 despite the heavy passenger demands operating to and from essential industries, working a daily three-shift operation. By 1953 McVicars had 31 vehicles.

In 1951 a bus was stolen from McVicar's and abandoned at Clyde.

In February 1962 Archibald McVicar Snr died at the age of 72.. Arch McVicar Jnr and his sister Mavis took over the running of the business. Mavis had joined the office side of the operation in 1931 after leaving school taking over from Mrs McVicar Snr. She was the mainstay of the company's administration for nearly 40 years.

The family decided to sell the business in 1978. The company was split three ways on 25 March 1978:

- Routes 12, 22, 23, 24, 38, 125 & 137 to Bankstown Bus Lines, later renamed South Western Coach Lines
- Route 27 to Bankstown-Strathfield Bus Service
- Route 123 to Drummond Transit

As of September 2026, these routes are operated by Transit Systems and U-Go Mobility in a modified form as part of the region 3 and 10 Sydney metropolitan bus service contracts.

== Routes ==
Route	Start	End
12	Bankstown	Milperra Bridge via Panania
22	Bankstown	East Hills via Milperra
23	Bankstown	Picnic Point and East Hills with additional daytime services operating from East Hills to Roselands Shopping Centre
24	Bankstown	One Tree Point via Padstow
27	Bankstown	Strathfield
38	Bankstown	Revesby Heights via Padstow
123	Lidcombe	Regents Park
125	Bankstown	Lidcombe
137	Padstow	Panania

== Fleet ==
When the business was sold in 1978 the fleet consisted of 53 buses, mainly AECs and Leylands operating on nine routes. McVicar's livery was a red body with cream window pillars and a brown roof with a McVicar Omnibus Service monogram on the sides. A variation of this livery was adopted by Bankstown-Strathfield Bus Service and remained in use until the operation was sold to Transit First in May 2003.
