= Holsworthy railway station, Sydney =

Railway station in Sydney, New South Wales, Australia

Holsworthy
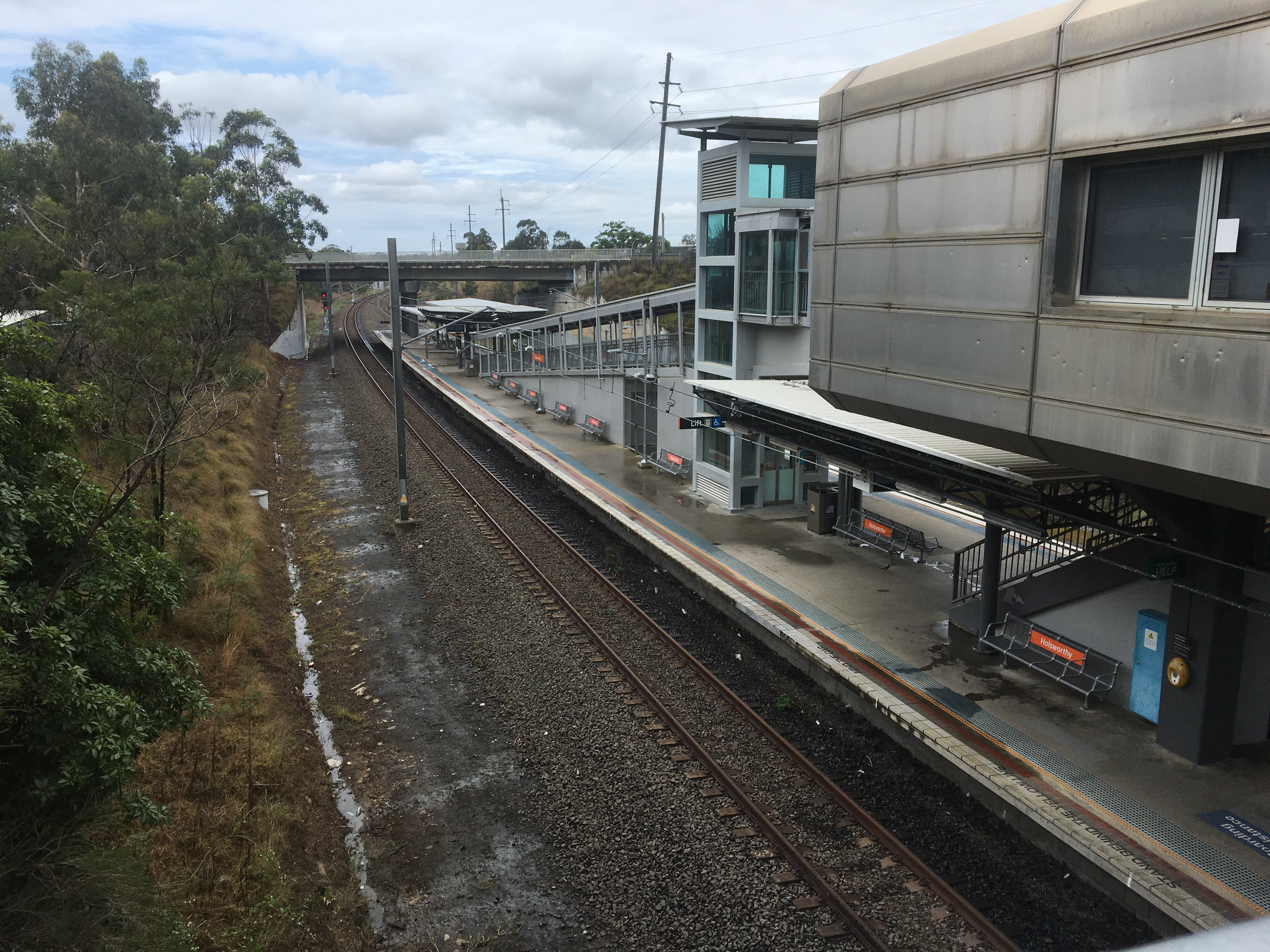
- Station entrance, building and platform, January 2020

General information
- Location: Macarthur Drive, Holsworthy
- Coordinates: 33°57′48″S 150°57′24″E
- Elevation: 15 metres (49 ft)
- Owner: Transport Asset Manager of New South Wales
- Operator: Sydney Trains
- Line: East Hills
- Distance: 26.76 kilometres (16.63 mi) kilometres from Central
- Platforms: 2 (1 island)
- Tracks: 2
- Connections: Bus

Construction
- Structure type: Ground
- Accessible: Yes

Other information
- Status: Weekdays: Staffed: 6am to 7pm: Weekends and public holidays: Staffed: 8am to 4pm
- Station code: HOL
- Website: Transport for NSW

History
- Opened: 21 December 1987

Passengers
- 2025: 1,473,842 (year); 4,038 (daily) (Sydney Trains)
- Rank: 98

Services
Preceding station	Sydney Trains	Following station
Glenfield towards Macarthur	Airport & South Line	East Hills towards City Circle
Location

Holsworthy railway station is located on the East Hills line, serving the Sydney suburb of Holsworthy. It is served by Sydney Trains' T8 Airport & South Line services.

== History ==
Holsworthy station opened on 21 December 1987 when the East Hills line was extended from East Hills to Glenfield.

The station was upgraded and received a lift to the platform in 2003.

== Platforms and services ==
Platform	Line	Stopping pattern	Notes
1	Airport & South Line	services to Central & the City Circle via the Airport; 13 weekday morning peak services to Central & the City Circle via Sydenham	
2	Airport & South Line	services to Macarthur; 8 weekday evening peak services to Campbelltown or Macarthur via Sydenham	

== Transport links ==
Transit Systems operates three bus routes via Holsworthy station, under contract to Transport for NSW:

- 901: to Westfield Liverpool via Wattle Grove
- 902: to Westfield Liverpool via Moorebank
- 912: to Sandy Point
