= Bankstown City Library and Information Service =

Coordinates: 33°54′58.92″S 151°2′5.4″E

Bankstown City Library and Information Service was a library service in Sydney. Bankstown situated in the south-west of Sydney, Australia. Part of Bankstown City Council, the library service includes the Central Library, located in Bankstown Central Business District, and four branch libraries Chester Hill, Greenacre, Padstow and Panania.

== History ==
Bankstown was one of the first Metropolitan Councils to establish a free public library, with the opening of a children's library in 1946. The library was originally known as Bankstown Municipal Library, and when Sir Roden Cutler, the Governor of NSW, declared Bankstown a city in 1980 the library officially became known as Bankstown City Library. The original children's library was replaced by a full library service and the current building was opened in May 1983. In 2010, plans for a new library building were confirmed on the existing Bankstown Town Hall site and construction of a new library to be completed early 2014.

=== Amalgamation ===
In May 2016, Bankstown City Council was merged with the neighbouring Canterbury City Council. The two library services consequently merged to become Canterbury-Bankstown Library and Knowledge Centres.

== Bankstown Library and Knowledge Centre ==
The old central library building was replaced with the new Bankstown Library and Knowledge Centre designed by architects Francis-Jones Morehen Thorp (FJMT) repurposing the old Town Hall Building built in the 1970s. The new library was officially opened by the Mayor Khal Asfour on Sunday, 6 April 2014. The building is 5000m2 and includes meeting rooms and the 300 seat Bryan Brown Theatre.

Bankstown City Library and Information Services follows guidelines and policies of the State Library of New South Wales, National Library of Australia and the Library Act of New South Wales
