= Voyager Point, New South Wales =

Voyager Point
- Suburb
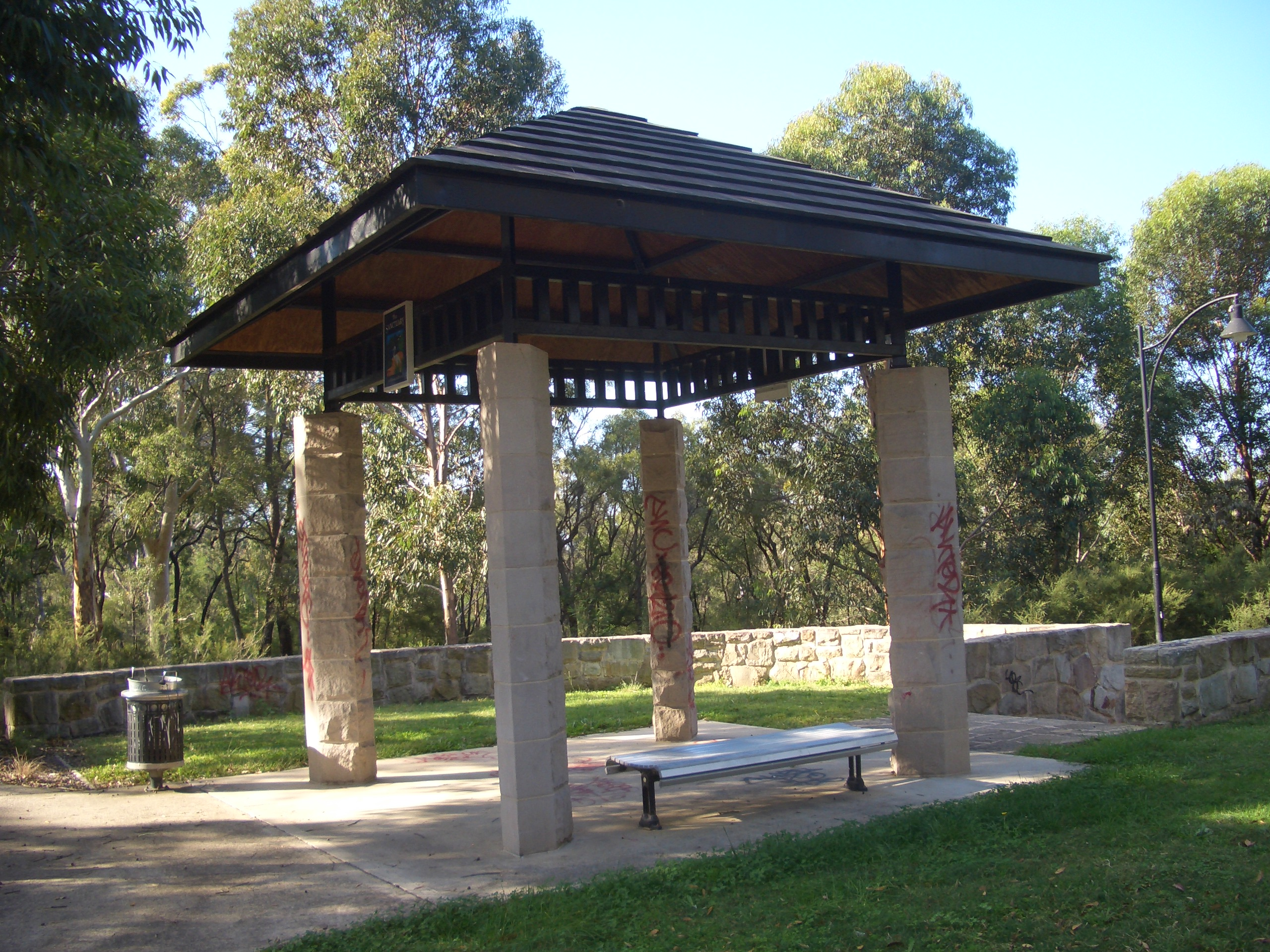
- The Sanctuary, Voyager Point

- Interactive map of Voyager Point
- Country: Australia
- State: New South Wales
- City: Sydney
- LGA: Liverpool
- Location: 27 km (17 mi) south-west of Sydney CBD
- Established: 1987

Government
  - State electorate: Holsworthy
  - Federal division: Hughes
- Elevation: 5 m (16 ft)

Population
  - Total: 1,678 (2021 census)
- Postcode: 2172
Suburbs around Voyager Point
Hammondville	Milperra	Panania
Hammondville	Voyager Point	East Hills
Holsworthy	Holsworthy	Pleasure Point

Voyager Point is a suburb, in South Western Sydney, New South Wales, Australia. Voyager Point is located 25 kilometres (35 min) south of the Sydney central business district, in the local government area of the City of Liverpool. The only adjacent suburbs are Sandy Point, Holsworthy and Pleasure Point. Milperra, Panania and East Hills are located on the opposite bank of the Georges River. In the 2021 census, Voyager Point recorded a population of 1,678 people.

== History ==
Voyager Point takes its name from the commemorative park which was established following the loss of HMAS Voyager with the loss of 82 lives after the destroyer collided with the aircraft carrier HMAS Melbourne in February 1964. This area was formerly the East Hills Naval Estate, which contained about 70 married quarters for families of members in the Royal Australian Navy. This suburb also housed refugees from 1954 many of whom who had fled concentration and refugee camps in Australia.

== Heritage listings ==
Voyager Point has a number of heritage-listed sites, including:

- Creekwood Reserve: Lucas Watermills Archaeological Sites

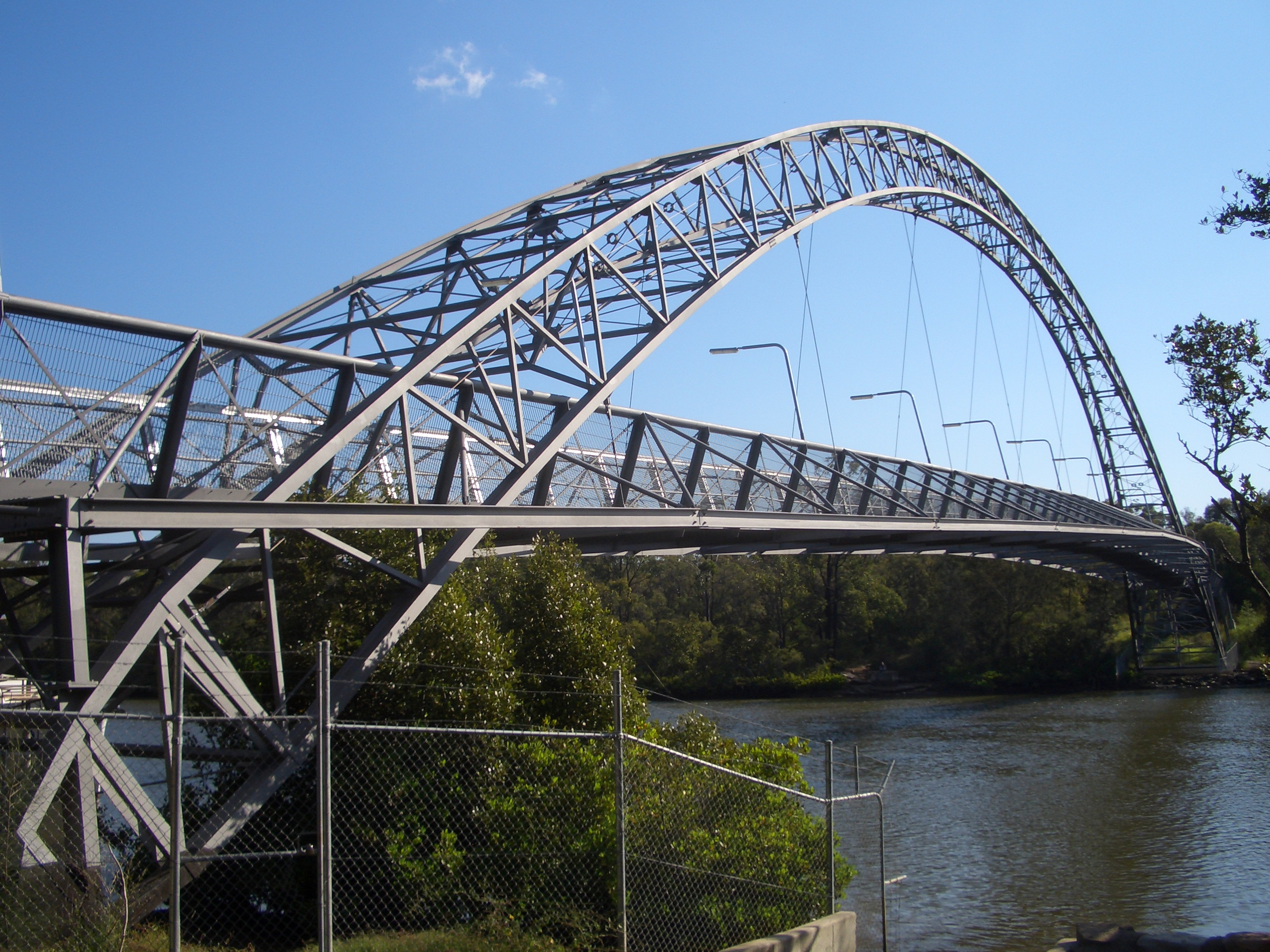
East Hills - Voyager Point footbridge

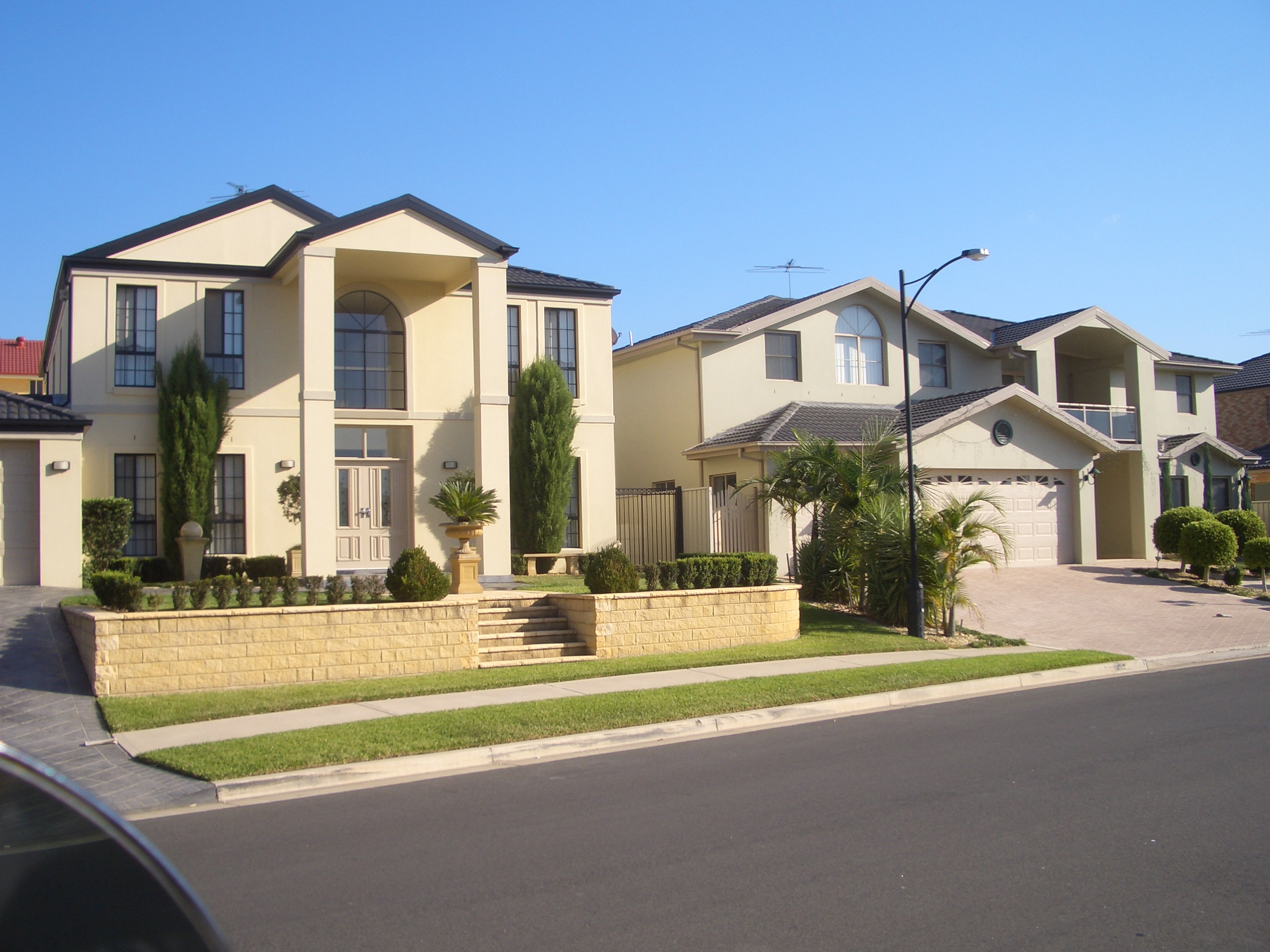
Boronia Drive

== Landmarks ==
The area includes many native flora, fauna and walkways through the bushland areas. A footbridge across the Georges River connects the suburb to East Hills, near Henry Lawson Drive. The Avenue is the only access road into the suburb from Heathcote Road.

== Streets ==
The original streets in the suburb, such as Torch and Pelorus, were named after ships of the Second Fleet. The suburb is a relatively new development by Delfin Lend Lease on land formerly belonging to Holsworthy Barracks. A second development was released in the early 2010s released by Defence Housing Australia in the North West Corner.
