= Menai, New South Wales =

Suburb of Sydney, Australia

Menai
- Suburb
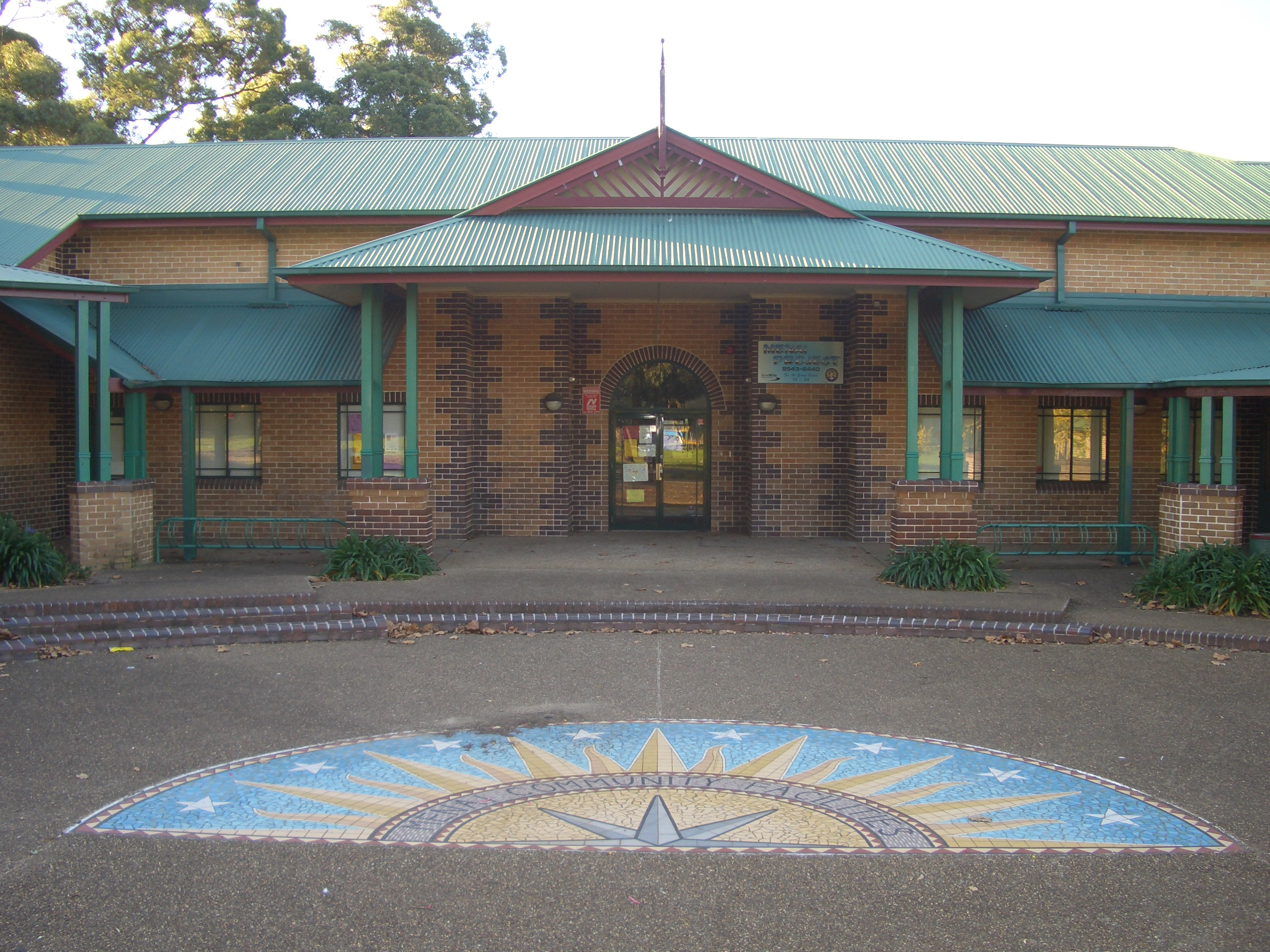
- Menai community buildings

- Interactive map of Menai
- Country: Australia
- State: New South Wales
- City: Sydney
- LGA: Sutherland Shire
- Location: 28 km (17 mi) south of Sydney CBD
- Established: 1973

Government
  - State electorates: Holsworthy; Miranda
  - Federal division: Hughes
- Elevation: 116 m (381 ft)

Population
  - Total: 10,419 (2021 census)
- Postcode: 2234
Suburbs around Menai
Holsworthy	Alfords Point	Illawong
Holsworthy	Menai	Bangor
Lucas Heights	Barden Ridge	Barden Ridge

Menai is a suburb in southern Sydney, in the state of New South Wales, Australia 29 kilometres south of the Sydney central business district in the local government area of the Sutherland Shire.

== History ==
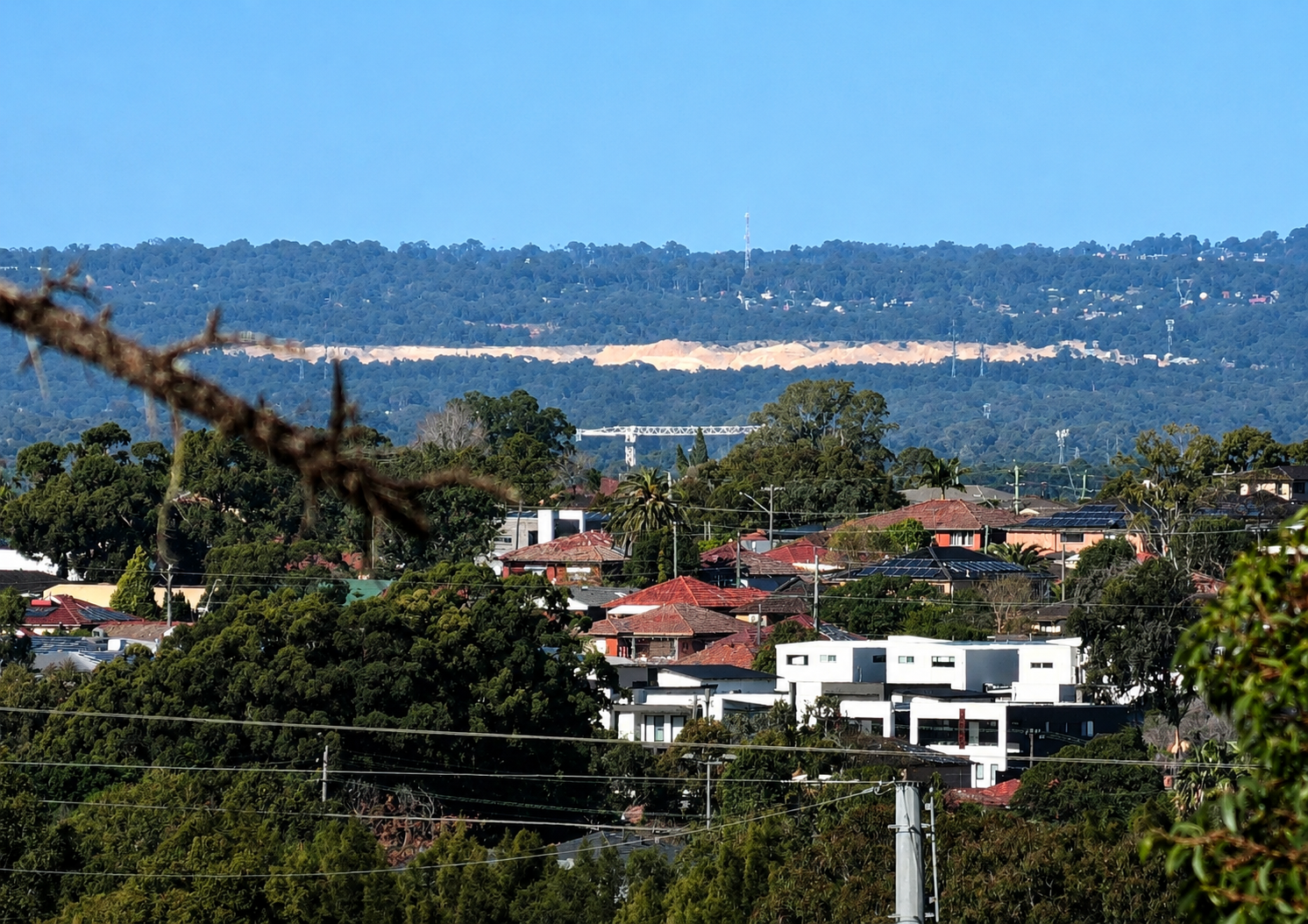
Menai (in the background), viewed from Pemulwuy

Menai is named after Menai Bridge, a town on the Menai Strait in Wales.

The area now known as Menai was originally called Bangor in 1895 by the land's owner, a farmer named Owen Jones, after his birthplace Bangor in Wales. To avoid confusion with Bangor in Tasmania, the Postmaster General's Office changed the suburb name to Menai in 1910. Menai Bridge in Wales lies opposite Bangor on the Menai Strait. When Menai expanded, the eastern section became Bangor again.

The suburb has been affected by bushfires on several occasions, including the 1994 Eastern seaboard fires and 2017–18 Australian bushfire season.

== Commercial area ==
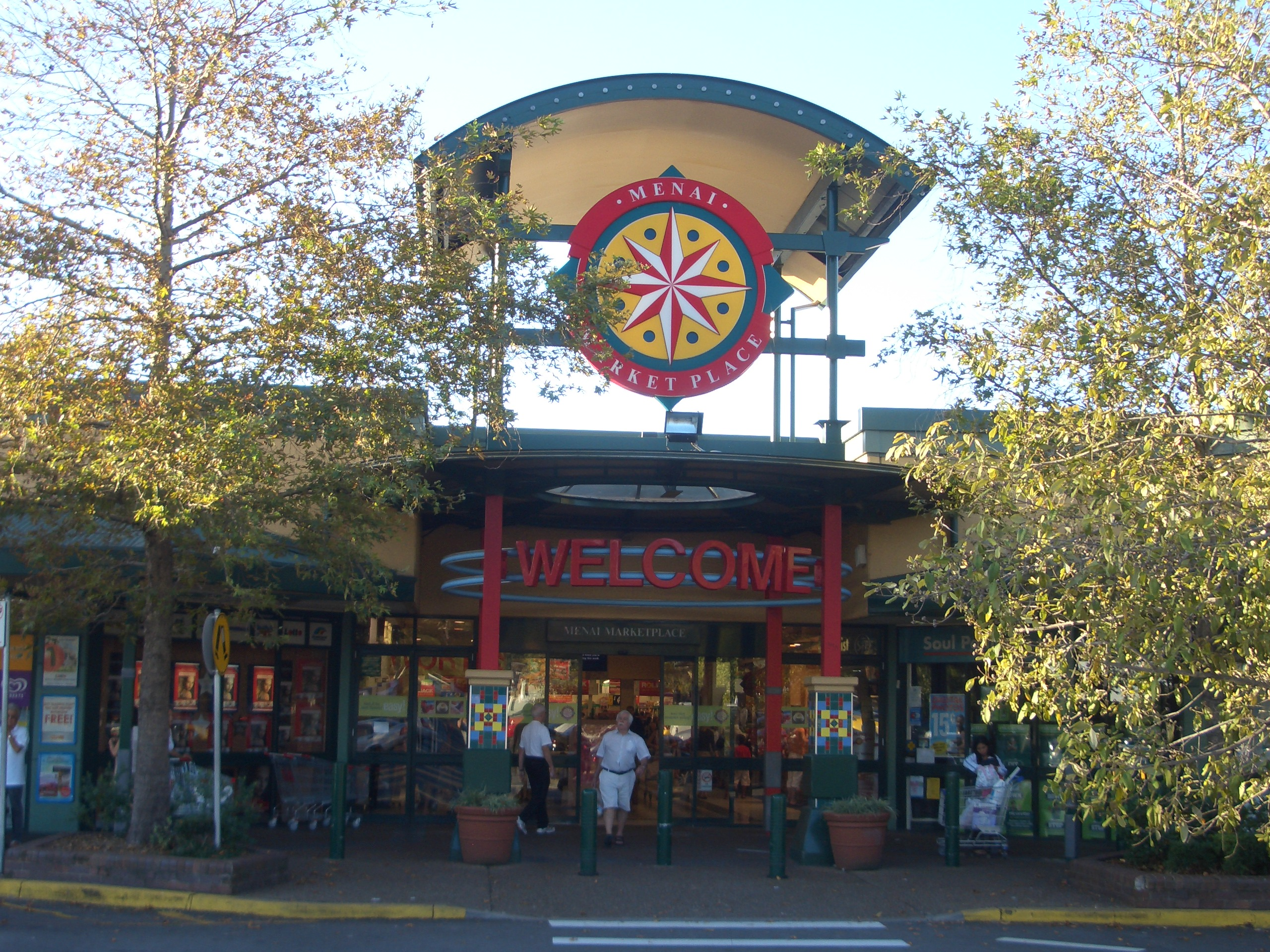
Menai Marketplace

Menai contains three bustling shopping centre around Menai Road with many retail stores and fine restaurants: Menai Marketplace, Menai Metro and Menai Central.

1. Menai Marketplace is located beside the Menai Community Buildings and features a Woolworths supermarket, Big W discount department store and many specialty shops including a Bakers Delight and formally Michel's Patisserie. Menai Library is located near the Menai Marketplace.
2. Menai Metro consists of professional suites and restaurants and is located in Allison Crescent, Menai. Menai Metro comprises the dining out, restaurant, precinct in the area.
3. Menai Central is located in Carter Rd, Menai and comprises larger bulky goods stores including supermarkets, liquor, pets, and homewares.

== Population ==
According to the 2021 census of Population, there were 10,419 people in Menai.

- Aboriginal and Torres Strait Islander people made up 1.3% of the population.
- 78.6% of people were born in Australia. The next most common countries of birth were England 2.5%, China 1.4%, South Africa 1.2%, New Zealand 1.1% and North Macedonia 0.9%.
- 80.4% of people spoke only English at home. Other languages spoken at home included Greek 2.5%, Arabic 2.0%, Mandarin 1.8%, Macedonian 1.8% and Cantonese 1.1%.
- The most common responses for religion were Catholic 30.7%, No Religion 25.0%, Anglican 16.5% and Eastern Orthodox 7.4%.

== Housing ==
Menai is a newer suburb, having been developed only since the early 1980s, and as such, nearly all the homes are new 4-bedders with dual bathrooms and double-garages and mostly owner occupied. In fact, the region has one of the highest rates of home ownership in Australia, at over 81%.

== Schools ==
Menai's schools include Menai Primary [K-6], Aquinas College [Catholic, 7-12] and Holy Family Primary School [Catholic, K-6]. Menai High School [7-12] is not in Menai, but just outside in Illawong.

== Sports and Recreation ==
The Menai Hawks FC are the local representative football club competing in the Sutherland Shire Football Association.

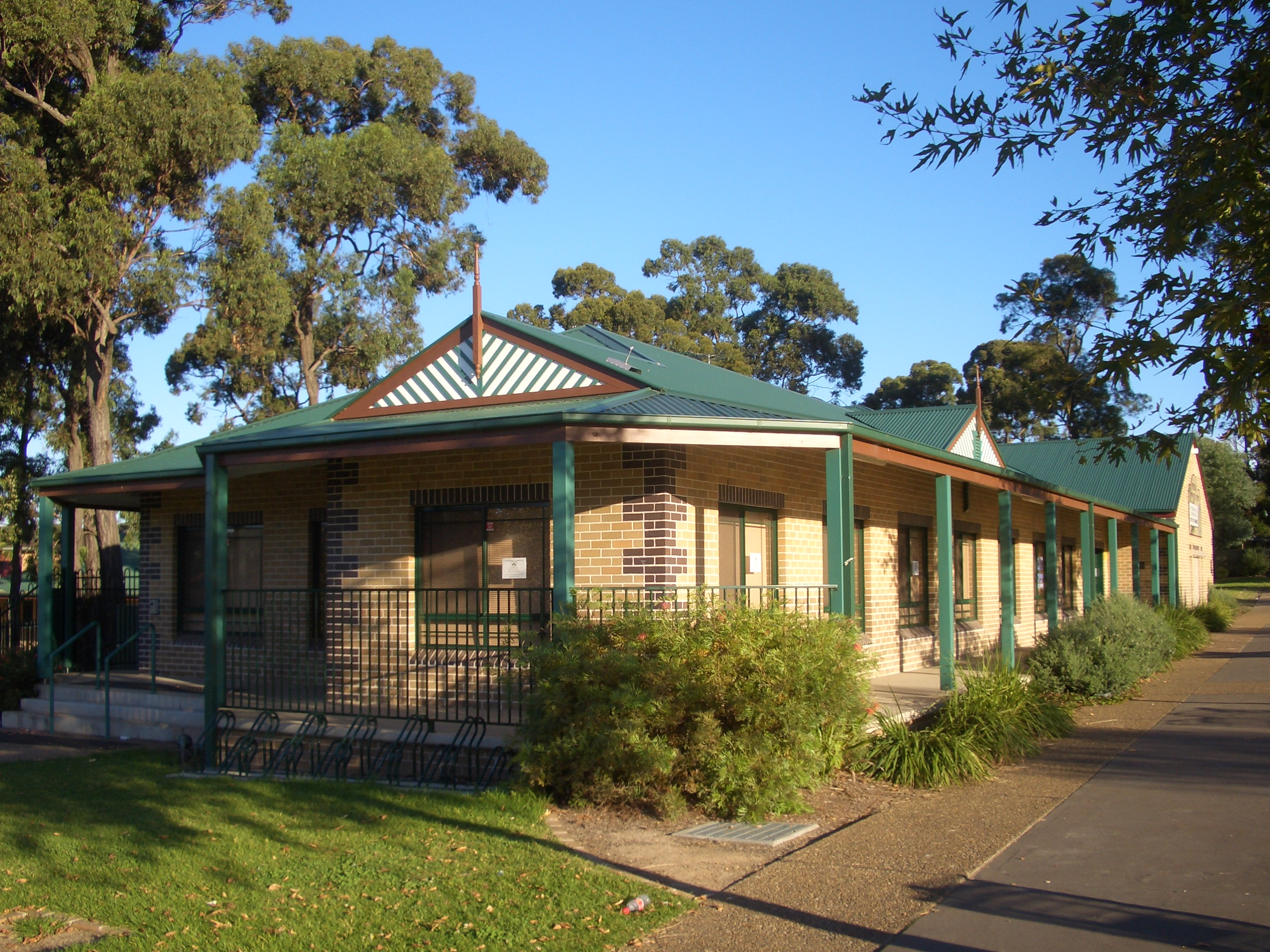
Menai Community Centre

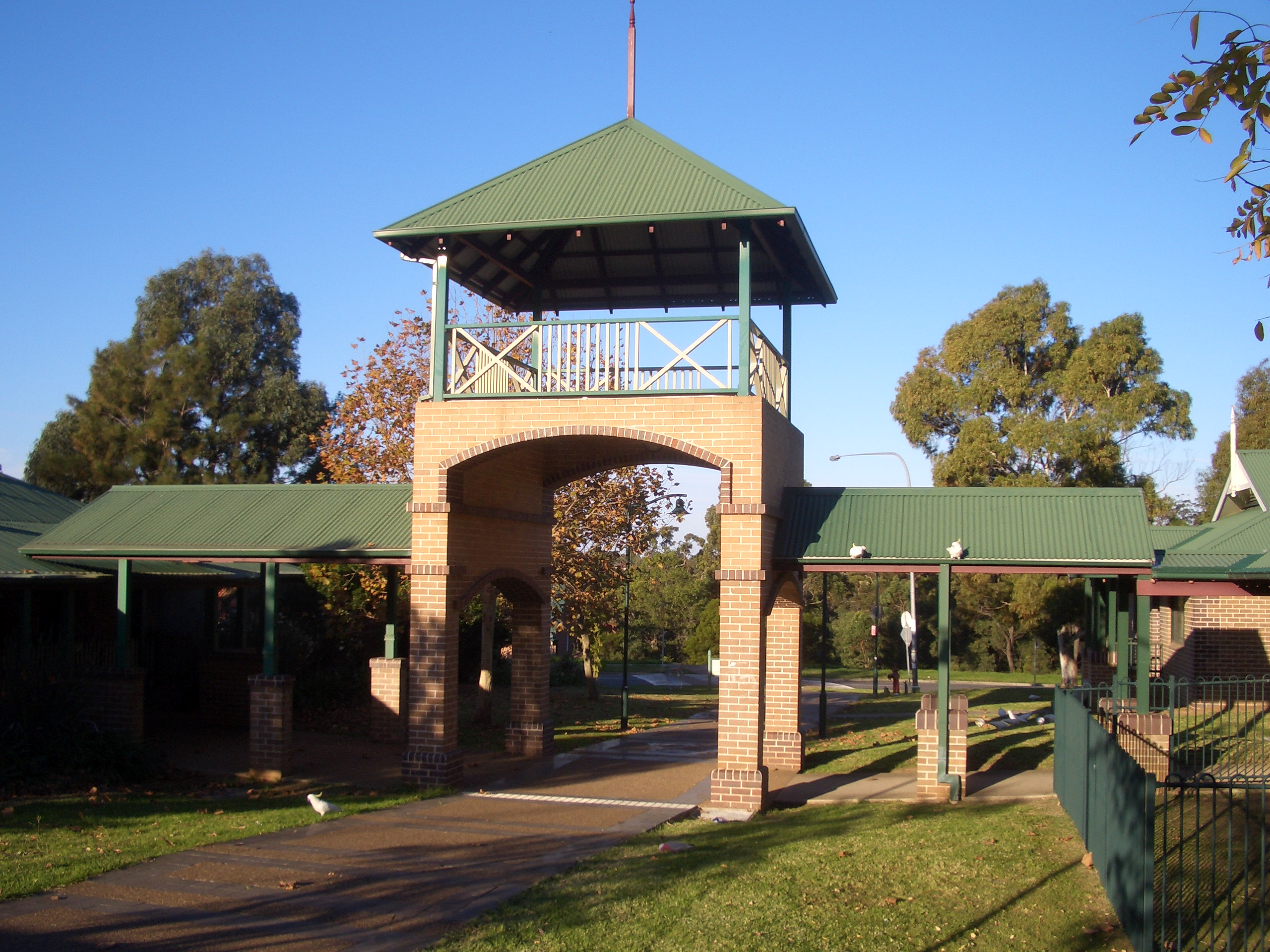
Menai Community Buildings

== Gallery ==
Menai NSW 2234, Australia – Panorama #1

Menai NSW 2234, Australia – Panorama #2

Menai NSW 2234, Australia – Panorama #3

Menai NSW 2234, Australia – Panorama #4

Menai NSW 2234, Australia – Panorama #5

Menai NSW 2234, Australia – Panorama #6

Menai NSW 2234, Australia – Panorama #7

Menai NSW 2234, Australia – Panorama #8

Menai NSW 2234, Australia – Panorama #9

Menai NSW 2234, Australia – Panorama #10
