= Andrew Jones (cricket administrator) =

Australian cricket administrator

- Born: 15 December 1972; Sydney
- Education: Newington College; UNSW; Stanford University
- Occupation: Management consultant/sports administrator
- Parent: Clayton Jones OAM

Andrew Clayton Jones (born 15 December 1972) is an Australian sporting administrator. From July 2022 until April 2024, he was the chief executive officer of Racing Victoria. Previously he was Head of Strategy at Cricket Australia from 2010 to 2012 and CEO of Cricket NSW from 2013 to 2019.

Jones was instrumental in numerous major initiatives in Australian cricket including the development and launch of the original KFC Big Bash and its successors the Big Bash League (BBL) and Women's Big Bash League (WBBL); governance and financial reform at Cricket Australia; non-privatisation of the BBL Clubs; and the Australian Team Performance (aka Argus) Review.

While at Cricket NSW, Jones led the professionalisation of the NSW Breakers, making them the first fully professional domestic women's team in Australian sport. This was a catalyst for full professionalisation of female domestic cricketers in 2017.

Jones also doubled the playing opportunities for NSW Metro and Country cricketers through the establishment of the NSW Metro and ACT/NSW Country teams at underage and Futures League levels.

During his tenure, Cricket NSW won every available professional and pathway title; the Sydney Sixers and Sydney Thunder Big Bash clubs achieved record attendances and viewership; grassroots participation hit all-time high levels; and Cricket NSW earned record revenue.

Jones was born in Sydney. His father, Irish-born Clayton William Jones OAM, was a cricketer and schoolmaster who became the first headmaster of Girton Grammar School in Bendigo.

Jones attended Newington College (1978–1990), commencing as a preparatory school student in Wyvern House. He graduated from the University of New South Wales with a BA and LLB and was awarded an MBA from Stanford University in 2003.

Before his appointment as Cricket Australia's Head of Strategy, Jones had worked as a management consultant for McKinsey & Company in Sydney and in his own practice.

Jones is also a credited screenwriter, having co-written feature film The Honourable Wally Norman, co-created sketch show Big Bite and contributed writing to Double Take.

Jones won "the lot" on the Australian quiz show Sale of the Century in 1993.
