= The Honourable Wally Norman =

- DVD cover
- Directed by: Ted Emery
- Written by: Andrew Jones; Rick Kalowski
- Produced by: Barbara Gibbs; Rick Kalowski; Emile Sherman; Jonathan Shteinman
- Starring: Kevin Harrington; Shaun Micallef; Greig Pickhaver
- Cinematography: David Foreman
- Edited by: Stephen Evans
- Music by: Paul Robert Burton; Jim Conway; Arne Hanna
- Distributed by: Becker Entertainment
- Release date: 13 November 2003
- Running time: 88 minutes
- Country: Australia
- Language: English

The Honourable Wally Norman is a 2003 Australian comedy film directed by Ted Emery. It stars Kevin Harrington, Shaun Micallef, and Greig Pickhaver.

It was filmed primarily in South Australia and was nominated for two AFI awards.

== Plot ==
The story begins with a corrupt Member of Parliament (Micallef) shutting down a country town's main source of employment in the local meatworks. This leaves Wally Norman (Harrington) out of a job, until drunk politician Willy Norman accidentally writes the wrong name on the parliamentary nomination form.

Wally is at first apprehensive about running, until he realises it is the only way to save the meatworks. Throughout the film Wally is coached by Willy Norman and assistant Myles Greenstreet (Nathaniel Davison) in how to best appeal to the voters, as well as overcome his fear of public speaking.

Meanwhile, Myles is attracted to Wally's daughter, and a wombat's career skyrockets.

Much of the film's humour comes from wordplay, such as naming the town Givens Head, and the foreman of the meatworks being named George. Shaun Micallef said he had to insist that his own moniker was modified from F. Ken Oath to F. Ken Oats to soften one of the film's less subtle attempts at punning.

== Cast ==
- Kevin Harrington as Wally Norman
- Alan Cassell as Willy Norman
- Shaun Micallef as Ken Oats
- Rosalind Hammond as Dolly Norman
- Nathaniel Davison as Myles Greenstreet
- Greig Pickhaver as The Chairman
- Octavia Barron-Martin as Laurie Norman
- Tom Budge as Normie Norman
- Bryan Dawe as Richard Nicholls
- Melissa Madden-Gray as Rebecca-Jane Thompson
- Paul Kelman as Gary
- Reg Evans as Barry
- Paul Makin as Alan Unwin Bookmaker

== Filming ==
The Honorable Wally Norman was filmed in various areas of South Australia. It used the towns of Lobethal, Mount Barker and Nairne for the town in the movie. The town of Lobethal provided the hotel, Mount Barker provided the meatworks and the St Francis de Sales College, and Nairne hosted the main street for the billy-cart race shown near the beginning of the movie.

Mike Rann, at that time Premier of South Australia, had a cameo appearance at 1:12:10 in the film. He played the man who was thrown out of his seat by The chairman.

== Critical reception ==
The Sydney Morning Herald described the film as: "dreary, like being offered a dried-out chop, fake mash and over-cooked broccoli, when you were invited over for a juicy lamb roast." SBS said "The Honourable Wally Norman seriously lacks bite; it's a determinably retro affair, amiable and mildly amusing, but pretty bland."
Urban Cinefile dismissed the film as "a shallow and contrived affair with the occasional shadow of humour passing over it."

== Box office ==
The Honourable Wally Norman grossed $181,395 at the box office in Australia.

== See also ==
- Cinema of Australia
- South Australian Film Corporation
