= Pleasure Point, New South Wales =

Pleasure Point
- Suburb
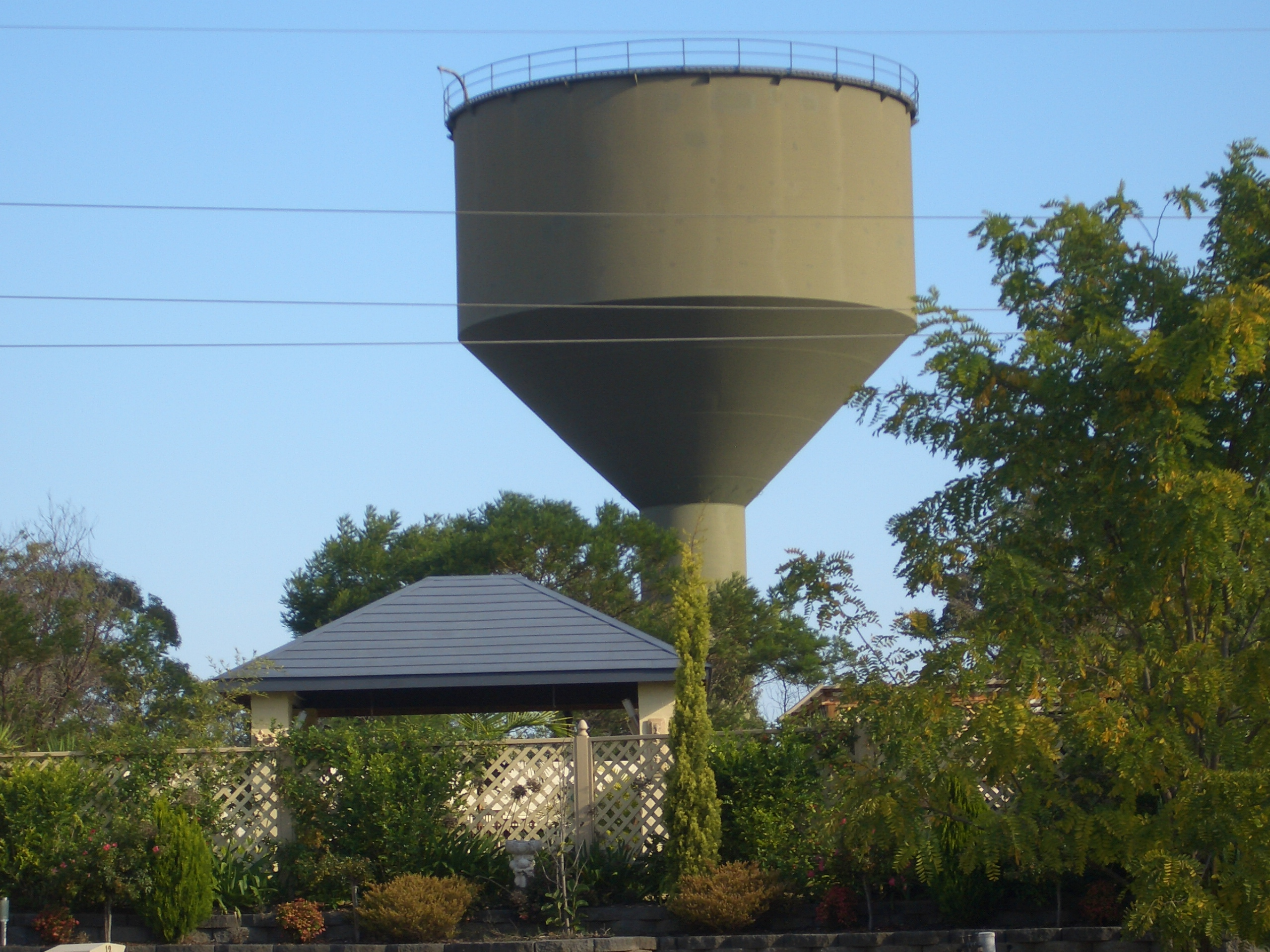
- Reservoir in Pleasure Point

- Interactive map of Pleasure Point
- Country: Australia
- State: New South Wales
- City: Sydney
- LGA: City of Liverpool
- Location: 27 km (17 mi) from Sydney CBD

Government
  - State electorate: Holsworthy
  - Federal division: Hughes
- Elevation: 11 m (36 ft)

Population
  - Total: 606 (SAL 2021)
- Postcode: 2172
Suburbs around Pleasure Point
Voyager Point	East Hills	Picnic Point
Holsworthy	Pleasure Point	Sandy Point
Holsworthy	Holsworthy	Sandy Point

Pleasure Point is a small suburb, in south-western Sydney, in the state of New South Wales, Australia. Pleasure Point is 27 km south west of the Sydney central business district, in the local government area of the City of Liverpool. Its postcode is 2172.

== Geography ==
Pleasure Point is a geographical formation on the southern bank of the Georges River which lends its name to the suburb. The only adjacent suburbs are Voyager Point, Sandy Point and Holsworthy. East Hills and Picnic Point are located on the opposite bank of the Georges River. The suburb has been around for more than 30 years. The boundaries of the suburb were altered by the creation of the suburb of Voyager Point in 1987. The Holsworthy Army Base is located near Pleasure Point.
