= Paul Makin =

Australian journalist

- Born: 18 December 1947 (age 78); Marrickville, New South Wales, Australia
- Occupations: Television and radio journalist
- Spouse: Marion Makin
- Children: 2
- Parent(s): William Andrew Makin (ca. 1918–2002) and Poppy Louisa Makin (1922–2015)

Paul Makin is an Australian journalist, television presenter, and radio broadcaster.

Makin gained prominence for his on-the-scene reporting of significant events. While working as a radio journalist for 2UE Sydney, he was the first news reporter to arrive at the site of the Granville rail disaster on January 18, 1977. His early radio reports provided crucial initial information about the disaster, one of Australia's deadliest rail accidents, which resulted in 84 fatalities.

Later, as a radio journalist with 3UZ, Makin covered the 1983 America's Cup in Newport, Rhode Island. He provided radio reports from the event, notably offering firsthand accounts from alongside the Australia II yacht and aboard The Black Swan with Alan Bond during the unveiling of the yacht's revolutionary winged keel.

== Personal life ==
Makin was born in Marrickville, Sydney on 18 December 1947, the only child of William and Poppy Makin. He grew up in the south-western Sydney suburb of Panania where he started his schooling at Panania North Public School and later attended Kingsgrove De La Salle.

== Career history ==
With a career spanning over six decades, Paul Makin is a veteran of the Australia media landscape. He began his career as a Cine-Cameraman, working for various television stations including ATN Channel 7 Sydney, NWS Channel 9 Adelaide, SAS Channel 10 Adelaide, WIN Channel 4 Wollongong, and as a stringer for ABC Sydney and TCN Channel 9 Sydney.

Notably, he was the cameraman responsible for filming the 1973 music video for Sister Janet Mead's "The Lord's Prayer," directed by Martin Erdman and released by Festival records in Australia and A&M records in the United States.

In 1973, Makin transitioned to radio journalism, joining 5KA Adelaide as a cadet. He moved to 2UE Sydney in 1976, working as a radio journalist and on-road reporter, and presenting the Night-watch program. He was the first news reporter to arrive at the scene of the Granville train disaster in 1977.

From 1977 to 1980, Makin was an on-air reporter for "Willesee at 7" and served as a fill-in presenter for Mike Willesee. In 1980, he relocated to Melbourne to work as a news reporter and presenter for "Newsbeat" on 3UZ. He covered the 1983 America's Cup in Newport, Rhode Island, and concurrently hosted the national game show "$50,000 Letterbox" from Channel 7 Perth, Western Australia.

In 1984, Makin joined Channel 10 Adelaide (formerly ADS Channel 7) as a senior reporter. He hosted programs including Makin’s Adelaide, State Affair and Great Mysteries of the World. During this period, he also served as an entertainment and senior reporter for This Week and was a regular contributor to Bert Newton's Good Morning Australia. In 1999 Makin took a hiatus from media to travel overseas.

He returned to broadcasting in 2000, accepting a senior reporter position with Today Tonight Channel 7 Adelaide and serving as a fill-in executive producer during periods of leave. Concurrently, he hosted various radio shifts on 5AA Adelaide during the Celebrity Summer Season and filled in for Leon Byner during his suspension.

Between 2001 and 2007, Makin worked in Sydney in various freelance capacities. These included radio announcing roles at 2UE, Radio 2GB, and ABC NewsRadio, as well as serving as a senior television reporter for Channel 7 Today Tonight.

In 2007, Makin returned to Adelaide to assume the role of senior investigative journalist, reporter and stand-in presenter for Channel 7 Adelaide’s Today Tonight. Subsequently, in 2013, he undertook a six-month contract with 5AA, presenting the evening program.

In 2018, Paul Makin and his wife, Marion, acquired a radio broadcasting license for Port Douglas, Australia, and launched FAB FM. Makin served as the station's Program Manager and breakfast announcer. FAB FM provided service to the Douglas Shire until its transition to the community station Douglas FM in mid-2022. Following the transition, Makin and his wife continued their involvement as volunteers for two years, providing training and administrative support. He semi-retired from media work in 2024.

=== Acting career ===
Makin has appeared in a variety of feature films, plays, and television shows, including a role as a television host in episode 578 of the series Prisoner. In addition to his acting work, Makin has also been involved in the production and hosting of corporate presentations and television commercials. He is a regular MC for charitable events.

== Feature films ==
- The Honourable Wally Norman: Playing the role of bookmaker Alan Unwin. Directed by Ted Emery and opened the 2003 Sydney Film Festival
- Street Hero: Playing the role of a car wash attendant. Directed by Michael Pattinson, Roadshow Films

== Television series ==
- Crawford Productions Zoo Family, Playing the Role of Film Director. Director: Chris Snell
- Crawford Productions Special Squad, Playing the Role of a Drunken Journalist. Director: Howard Rubie
- Crawford Productions The Flying Doctors, Playing the Role of Rodeo Caller. Director: Pino Amenta
- Crawford Productions Special Squad, Playing the Role of Sex Shop Grafter. Director: Arch Nicholson
- Crawford Productions Carson's Law, Playing the Role of Racehourse Trainer Mr Gilbertson. Director: Paul Moloney
- Crawford Productions Carson's Law, Playing the Role of Process Server. Director: Sean Nash
- Crawford Productions Cop Shop, Playing the Role of Real Estate Agent James Wilmott. Director: Robert Meillon
- Grundy Television Prisoner, Playing the Role of a Salesman. Director: Sean Nash
- Grundy Television Prisoner, Playing the Role of Talk Show Host Bob Michaels. Director: Kendal Flanigan

== Plays ==
- WA Productions Mothers And Fathers, Playing the Role of a Policeman. Director: Barrie Barkla
- Space Theatre Adelaide Deadly Nightcap, Playing the Role of Geoffrey Curtis. Director: John Edmund
- Clink Theatre Port Douglas Priscilla The Musical, Playing the role of Bob the Mechanic. Director: Michael Kerr.
