= East Hills, New South Wales =

East Hills
- Suburb
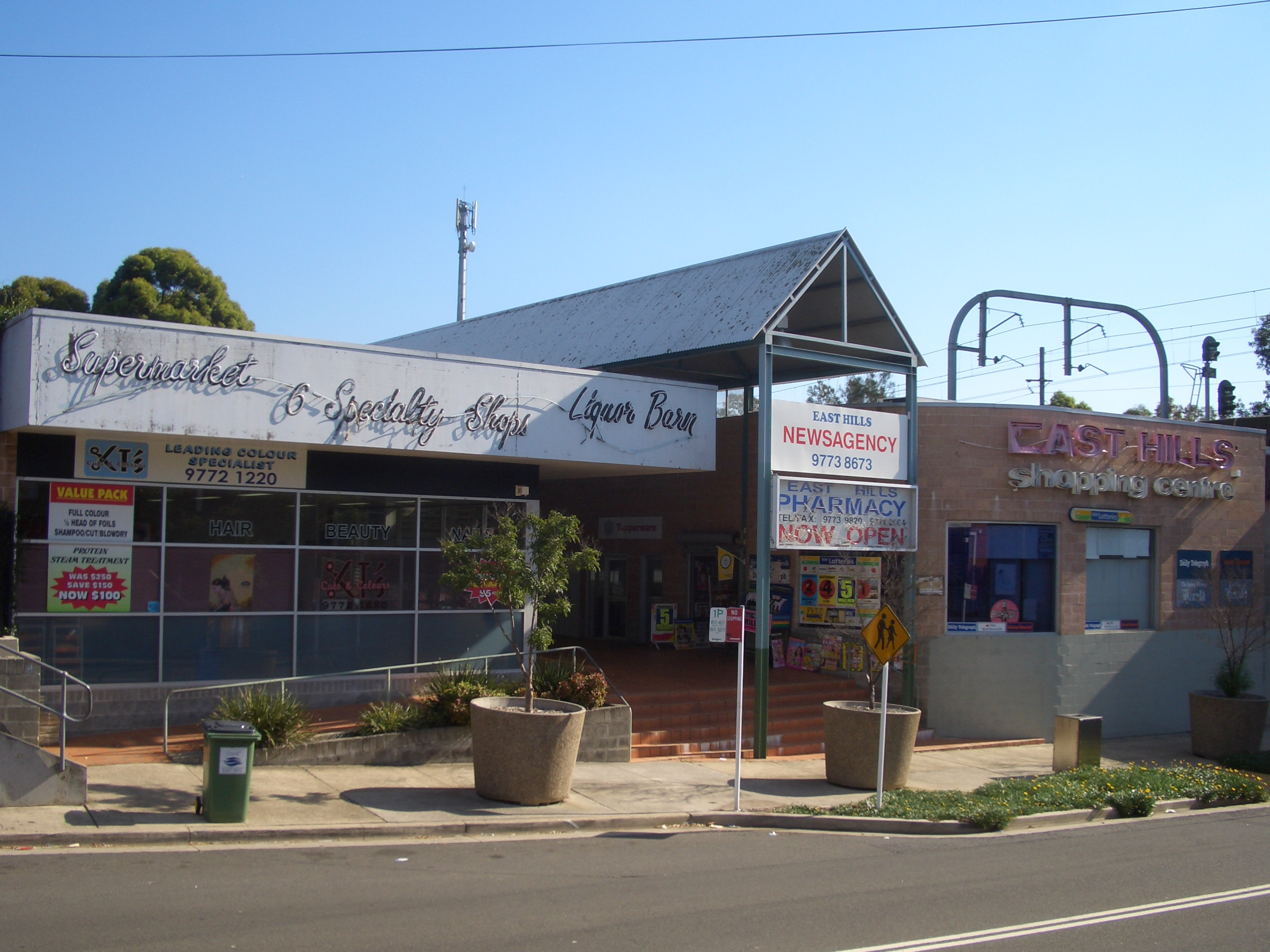
- Maclaurin Avenue, East Hills

- Interactive map of East Hills
- Country: Australia
- State: New South Wales
- City: Sydney
- LGA: City of Canterbury-Bankstown
- Location: 26 km (16 mi) south-west of Sydney CBD

Government
  - State electorate: East Hills
  - Federal division: Banks
- Elevation: 14 m (46 ft)

Population
  - Total: 3,370 (2021 census)
- Postcode: 2213
Suburbs around East Hills
Panania	Panania	Panania
Picnic Point	East Hills	Panania
Pleasure Point	Sandy Point	Picnic Point

East Hills is a suburb of South-western Sydney in the state of New South Wales, Australia. It is part of the local government area of City of Canterbury-Bankstown, and is located 26 kilometres south-west of the Sydney central business district. It is near larger areas like Revesby and Bankstown.

East Hills is a small suburb on the northern bank of the Georges River. The adjacent suburbs are Panania and Picnic Point. Nearby suburbs on the opposite bank of the Georges River include Pleasure Point, Voyager Point, Sandy Point and Hammondville.

== History ==
East Hills was the name used to describe the whole area south of Bankstown to the Georges River and east to The River Road. George Johnstone (1790–1820) was granted 500 acres (2.0 km^{2}) here in 1804 and called it New Jerusalem. It was west of The River Road between Bransgrove and Tomson Streets. Robert Gardiner a tenant on the property called his farm East Hills, possibly after the region of that name near Liverpool, England and since this area is close to another Liverpool. In 1828, Thomas Graham was granted 640 acres (2.6 km^{2}), south of Johnston’s land, which he sold to Charles Tompson in 1835. The area to the west was bought by George Nicholas Weston in 1838.

In 1893, the area was subdivided and named East Hills after the farm. The railway line was opened in 1931 and East Hills was the terminating station. The line was originally single track from Riverwood railway station to East Hills. This line was extended in 1987 to a new station at Holsworthy and connected to the Main South Line at Glenfield and on to Campbelltown. This provided another link to the city from areas like Minto, Campbelltown and Glenfield.

== Demographics ==
According to the 2021 census, there were 3,370 residents in East Hills. 65.9% of people were born in Australia. 63.5% of people spoke only English at home. Other languages spoken at home included Arabic 5.9% and Vietnamese 4.8%. The most common ancestries were Australian 26.9%, English 26.6%, Irish 8.1%, Chinese 7.3% and Lebanese 5.8%. The most common responses for religion were Catholic 26.1%, No Religion 24.8% and Anglican 13.1%.

== Commercial area ==
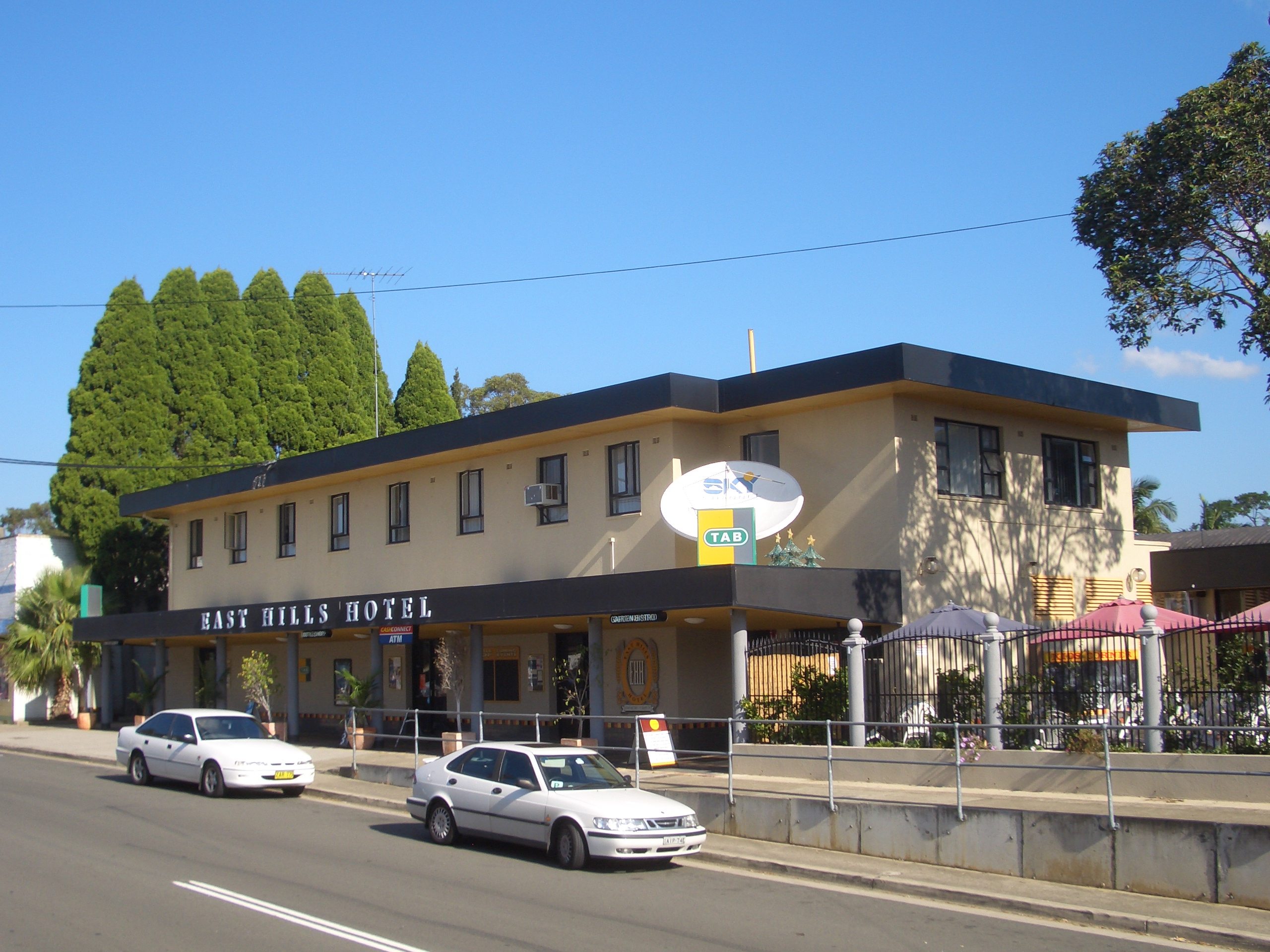
East Hills Hotel, Maclaurin Avenue

A small group of shops is located in Maclaurin Avenue, beside East Hills railway station. The East Hills Hotel is also located here.

== Transport ==
East Hills railway station is on the Airport & South Line of the Sydney Trains network. Parts of East Hills are serviced by buses operated by U-Go Mobility, generally following the routes established by McVicar's Bus Services.

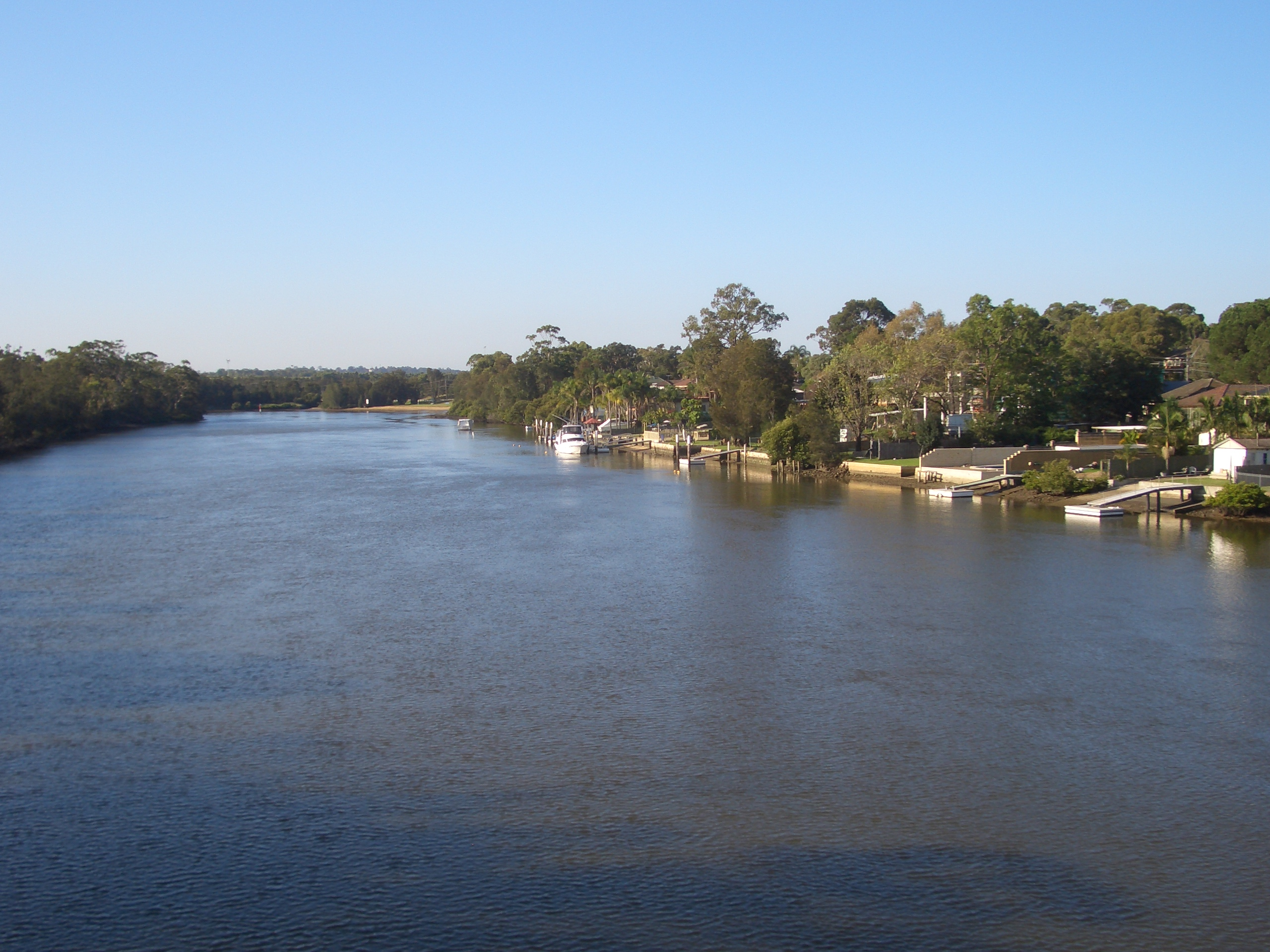
Georges River at East Hills

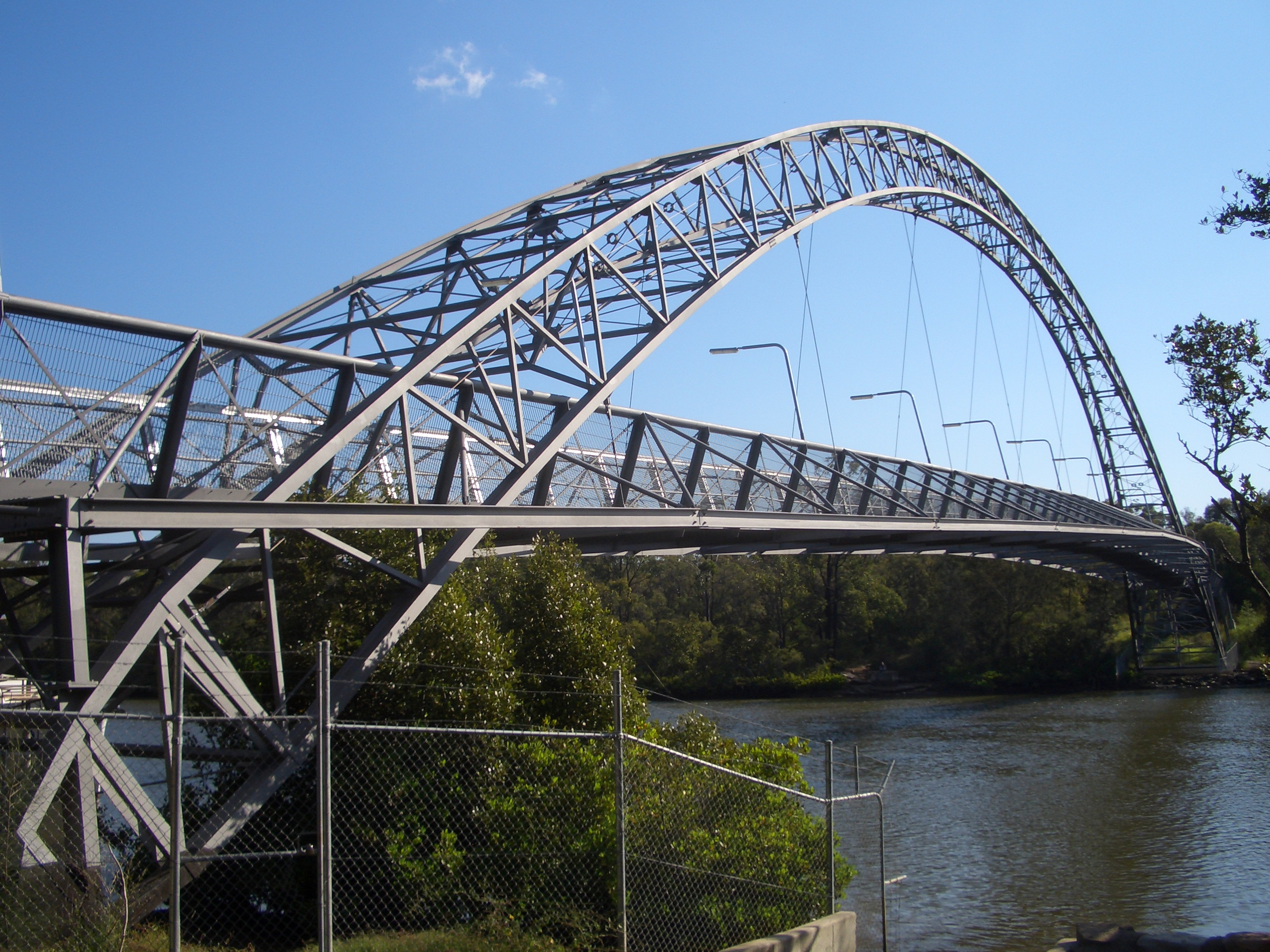
Footbridge over Georges River

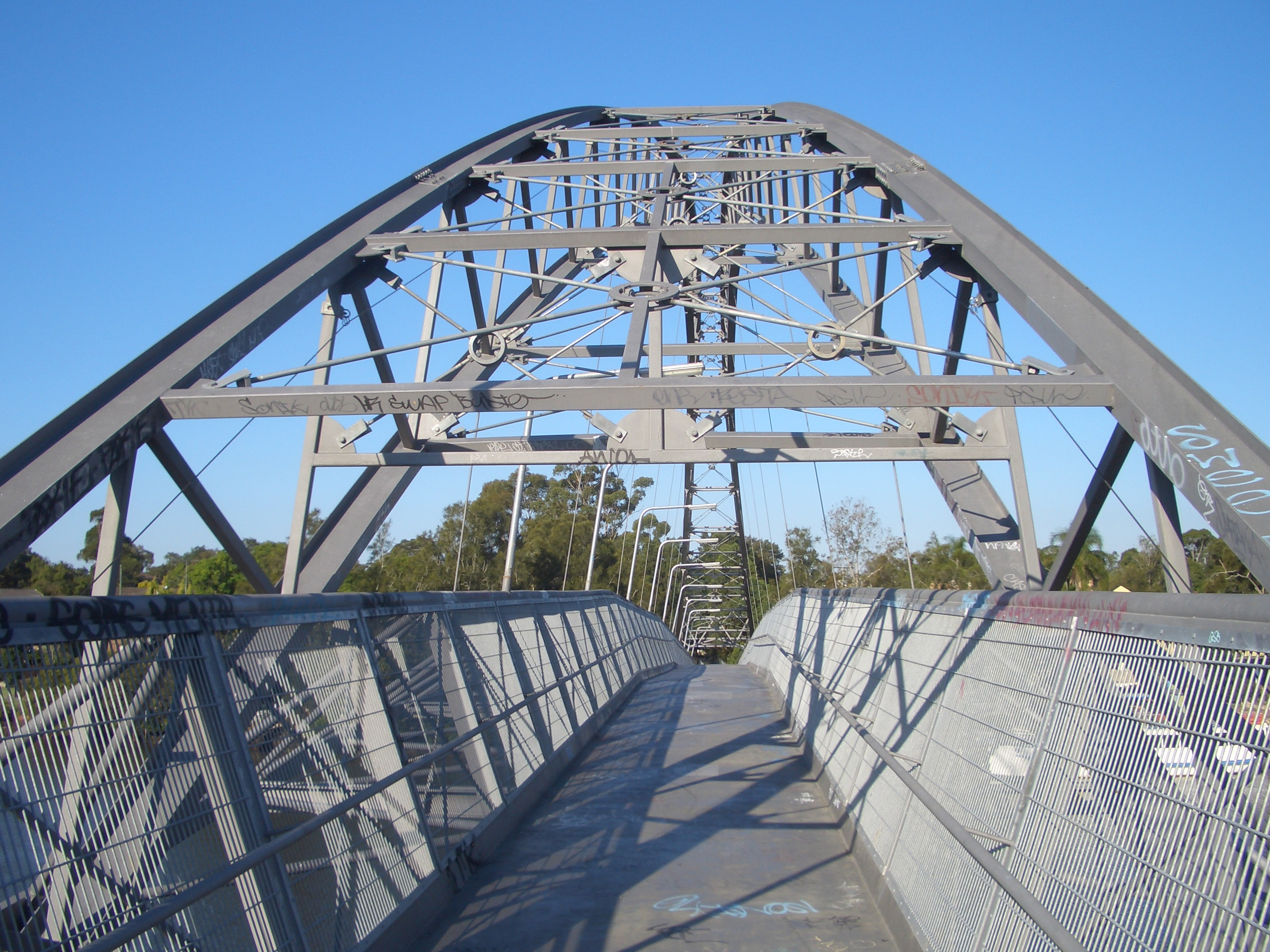
Footbridge over Georges River

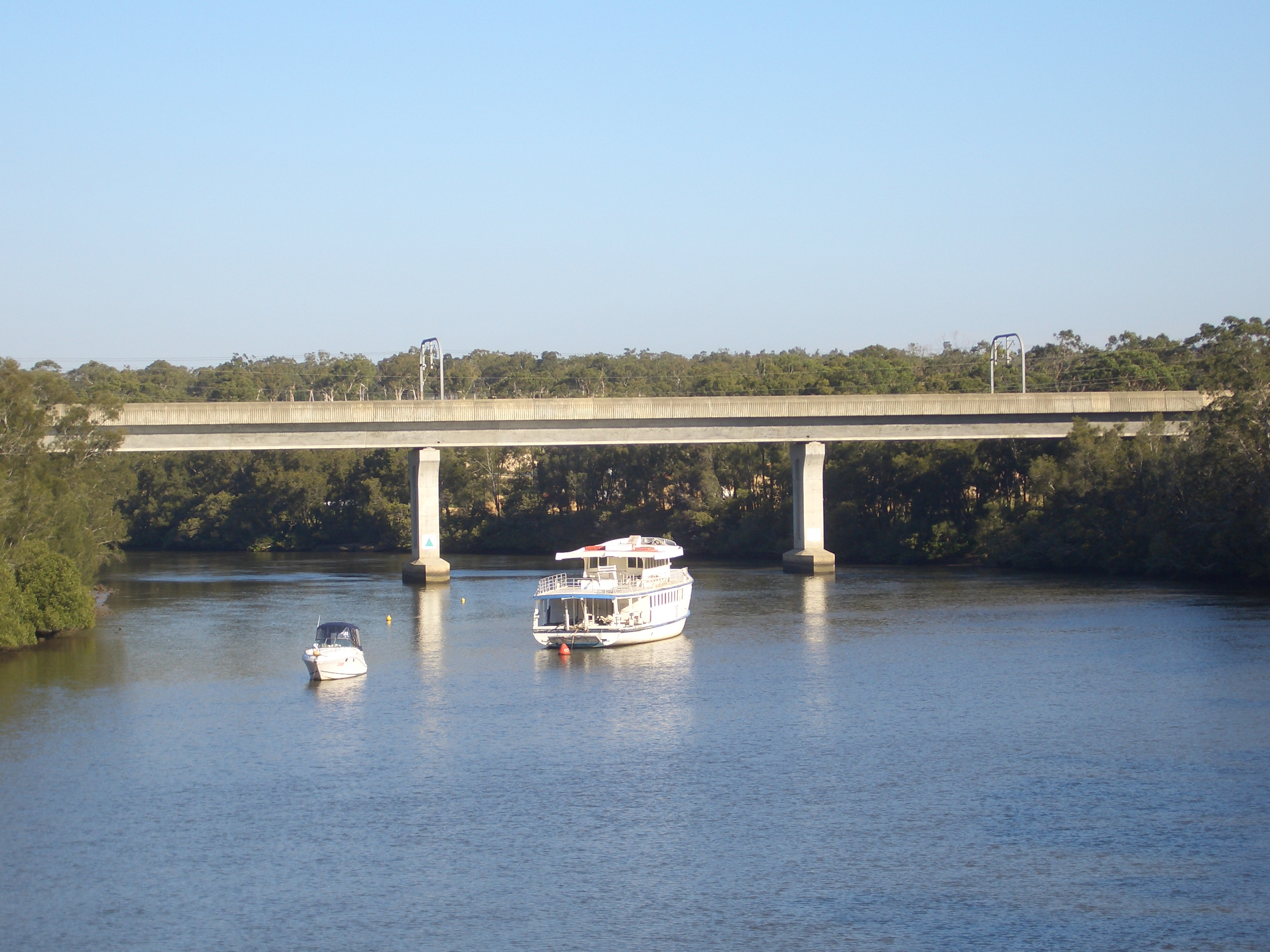
Railway bridge over Georges River

== Schools ==
East Hills has two high schools and one primary school: East Hills Boys, East Hills Girls Technology High School and East Hills Primary School.

== Sport ==
East Hills has a successful baseball club and the East Hills Bulldogs compete in the Canterbury-Bankstown District Junior Rugby League competition with Smith Park their home ground.
