= Panania =

- Suburb
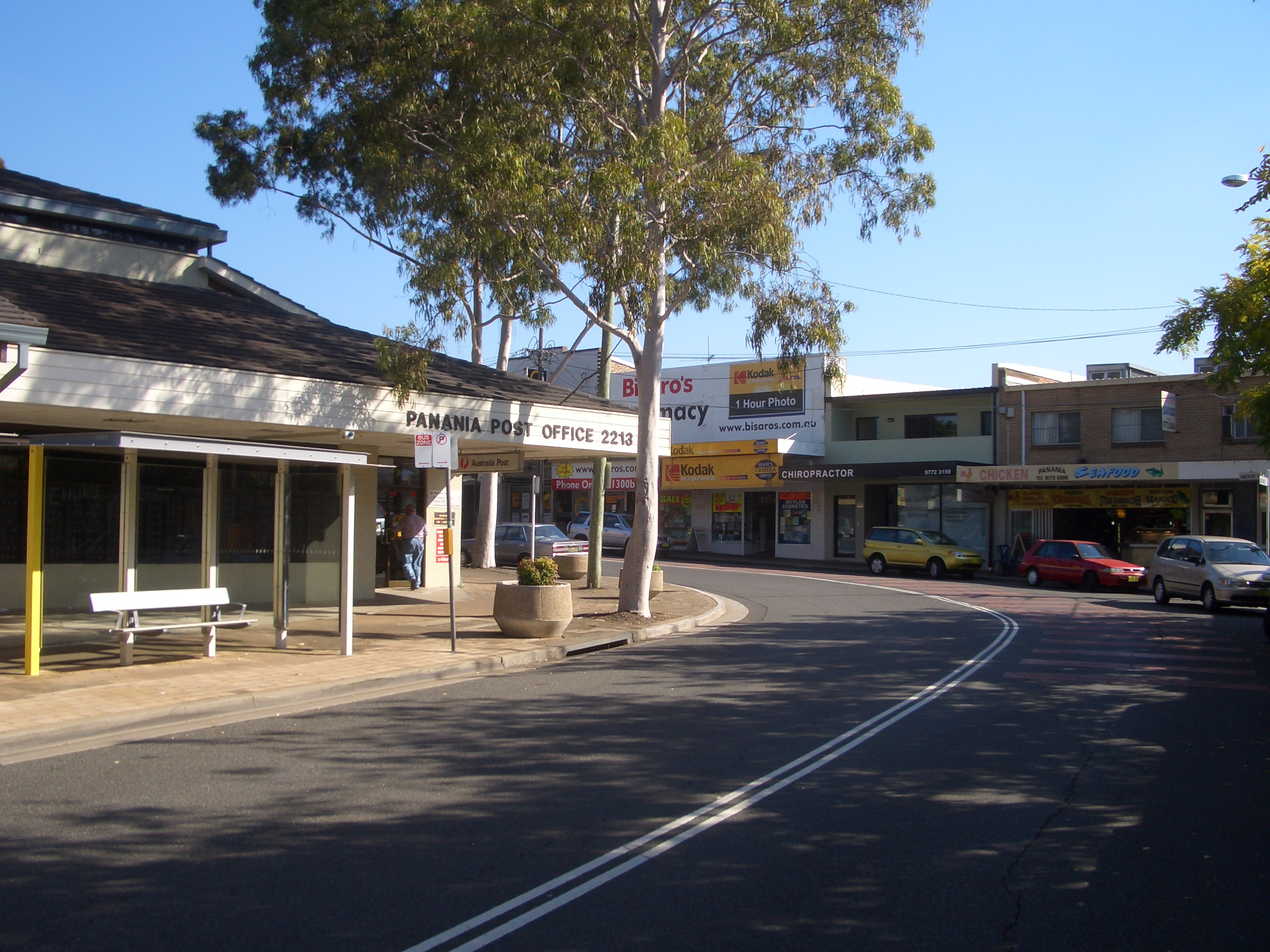
- Shops and post office in Panania c. 2007

- Interactive map of Panania
- Country: Australia
- State: New South Wales
- City: Sydney
- LGA: City of Canterbury-Bankstown
- Location: 23 km (14 mi) south-west of Sydney CBD

Government
  - State electorate: East Hills
  - Federal division: Banks
- Elevation: 23 m (75 ft)

Population
  - Total: 13,507 (2021 census)
- Postcode: 2213
Suburbs around Panania
Milperra	Milperra	Revesby
Voyager Point	Panania	Revesby
East Hills	Picnic Point	Revesby Heights

Panania (/pəneɪniə/) is a suburb in South Western Sydney in the state of New South Wales, Australia. It is part of the local government area of City of Canterbury-Bankstown and is located 23 kilometres inner south-west of the Sydney central business district. The postcode is 2213, which it shares with adjacent suburbs East Hills and Picnic Point.

Panania is bounded on the north by the M5 South Western Motorway and the suburb of Milperra. Picnic Point, to the south, features parklands along the Georges River. East Hills is the suburb to the west and Revesby is located to the east.

== History ==
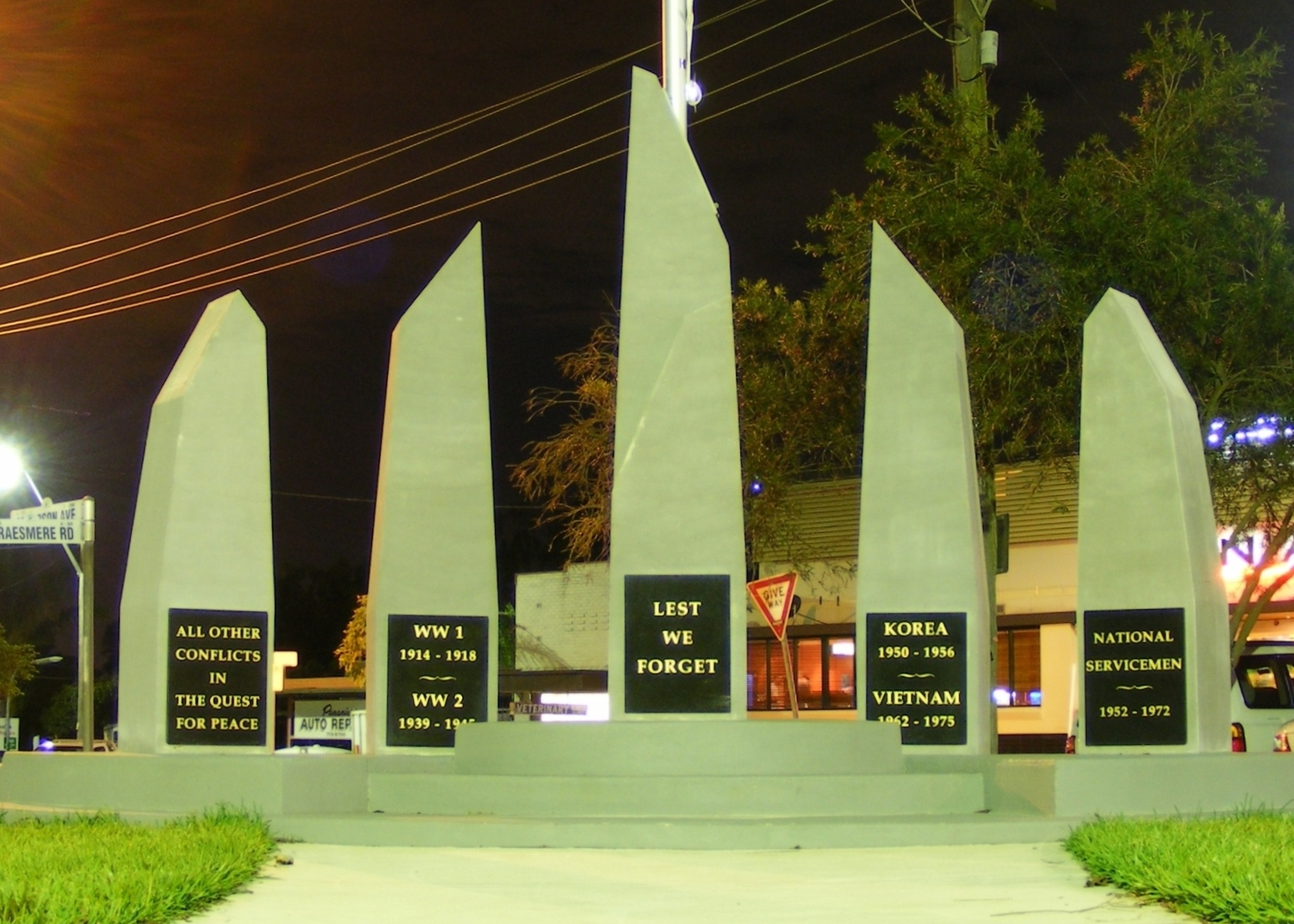
War memorial

The name Panania was on the original list of stations proposed for the Tempe-East Hills railway line in 1929. Prior to this, Panania was part of what was generally known as the East Hills district. Panania is an Aboriginal word meaning sun rising in the east and shining on the hills. An alternative theory is that the name may be a derivation of "Pannonia", which was an ancient province of the Roman Empire southeast of the Danube River. During the construction of the railway line the name Nioka was used for the station which is an Aboriginal word meaning the green hill. Other names suggested for suburb were Linden Park and Elmswood.

The arrival of the railway in 1931 stimulated the development of the East Hills district. Prior to this, the district was rural. There was a soldiers' settlement at Milperra which consisted mostly of poultry and horticultural enterprises. The only public transportation was a bus service to Bankstown railway station on the Bankstown line from various locations throughout the district, which posed a great inconvenience to people who needed to visit the Sydney CBD for work.

Development began apace after World War II. The Australian Legion of Ex-Servicemen and Women sponsored the mass production of housing at Panania beginning from 1946 with the construction of 34 houses.

St Christopher's Catholic Church on Tower Street was originally the Panania Star cinema. Panania North Public School, a short two block walk on the northern side of the railway line, became a demonstration school in the late 1970s so that trainee teachers from the newly established Milperra College of Advanced Education could observe teachers at work.

== Commercial area ==
Panania has a shopping area adjacent to Panania railway station. It runs along Weston Street, Anderson Avenue and Tower Street. Anderson Avenue features several local government facilities including a senior citizens centre and a public library. Panania Hotel is located on the northern side of Panania railway station.

The active Business Chamber is a significant strength of Panania.

== Transport ==
View north from the railway station, Panania Hotel at top right

Panania railway station is on the East Hills railway line. Parts of Panania are serviced by buses operated by U-Go Mobility, generally following the routes established by McVicar's Bus Services.

The East Hills railway line, which originally terminated one stop away at East Hills divided the suburb into two distinct precincts. During the 1980s, the railway line was extended with a rail bridge over the Georges River to Campbelltown.

== Demographics ==
Panania had a population of 13,507 people at the 2021 census. 49.0% of the population was male; 51.0% was female. 65.6% were born in Australia. 1.3% of the population were indigenous Australians.

=== Employment ===
At the 2021 census, 95.4% of Panania's population were employed.

=== Religious affiliation ===
At the 2021 census, the most common religious affiliations were: Catholic (26.4%), No Religion (21.8%), Anglican (10.4%), Eastern Orthodox (8.5%) and Islam (8.1%).

== Churches ==
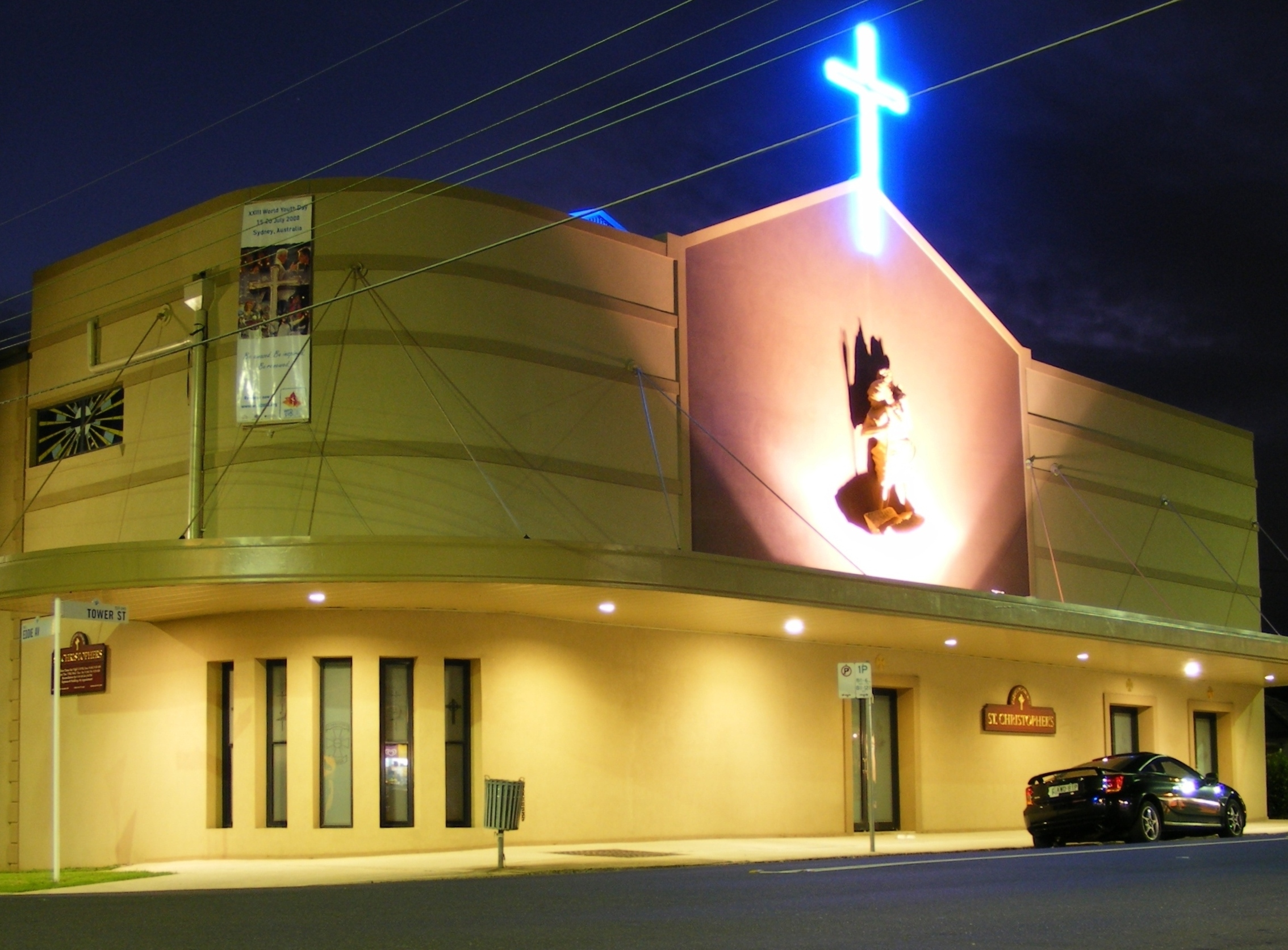
St Christopher's Catholic Church in 2008

Panania features notable buildings such as Holy Trinity Anglican Church and St Christopher's Catholic Church. St Christopher's is housed in the building formerly known as the Panania Star Cinema. The Panania Star Cinema was built in 1952 in the Art Deco style, and was the twin of the Padstow Star Cinema in nearby Padstow. The building retains a number of original features, including a decorative ceiling. After a grant from the Roman Catholic Archdiocese of Sydney and many donations from parishioners, the building underwent renovations costing $165,000 which were completed early in 2006.

The Salvation Army also has a Corps in Panania. The old building was recently refurbished.

Panania Uniting Church, was established in the early 1950s and moved to its current location at 206 Marco Ave, Panania in 1967.

== Schools ==
- East Hills Girls Technology High School
- East Hills Boys High School (est. 1955)
- Panania Public School
- Panania North Public School
- Tower Street Public School
- St Christopher's Catholic School

== Houses ==
Panania is mostly a residential suburb, which was developed after World War II and originally contained many modest freestanding bungalows built from asbestos cement sheeting (commonly known as fibro). Today, many of these houses have been rebuilt as larger residences or two-storey duplex houses.

== Notable residents ==
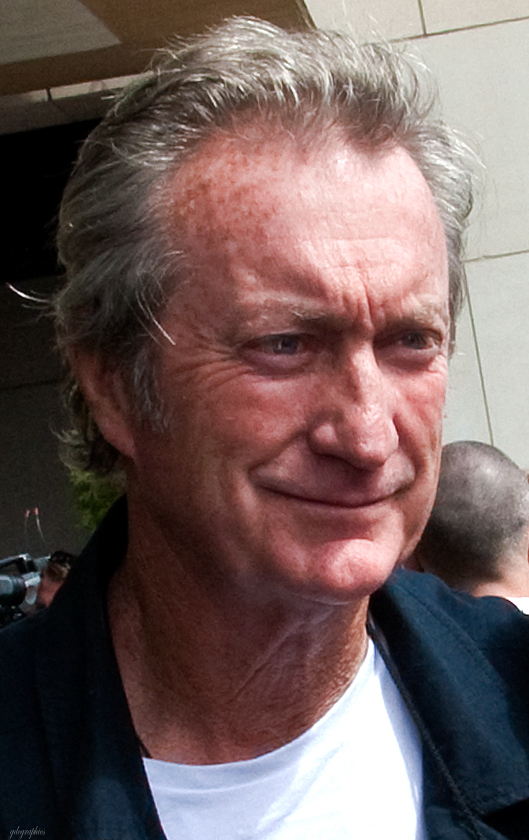
Bryan Brown was born in Panania

- Paul Abrahams, bass player for The Reels
- Actor Bryan Brown
- Col Joye, singer-songwriter
- Paul Makin, journalist
- Ron Raper, rugby league player
- Andrew and Michael Tierney from Human Nature
- Steve Waugh and Mark Waugh, former Australian cricketers

== Politics ==
Panania is in the Banks federal electorate and the East Hills state electorate.
