= Sandy Point, New South Wales =

Sandy Point
- Suburb
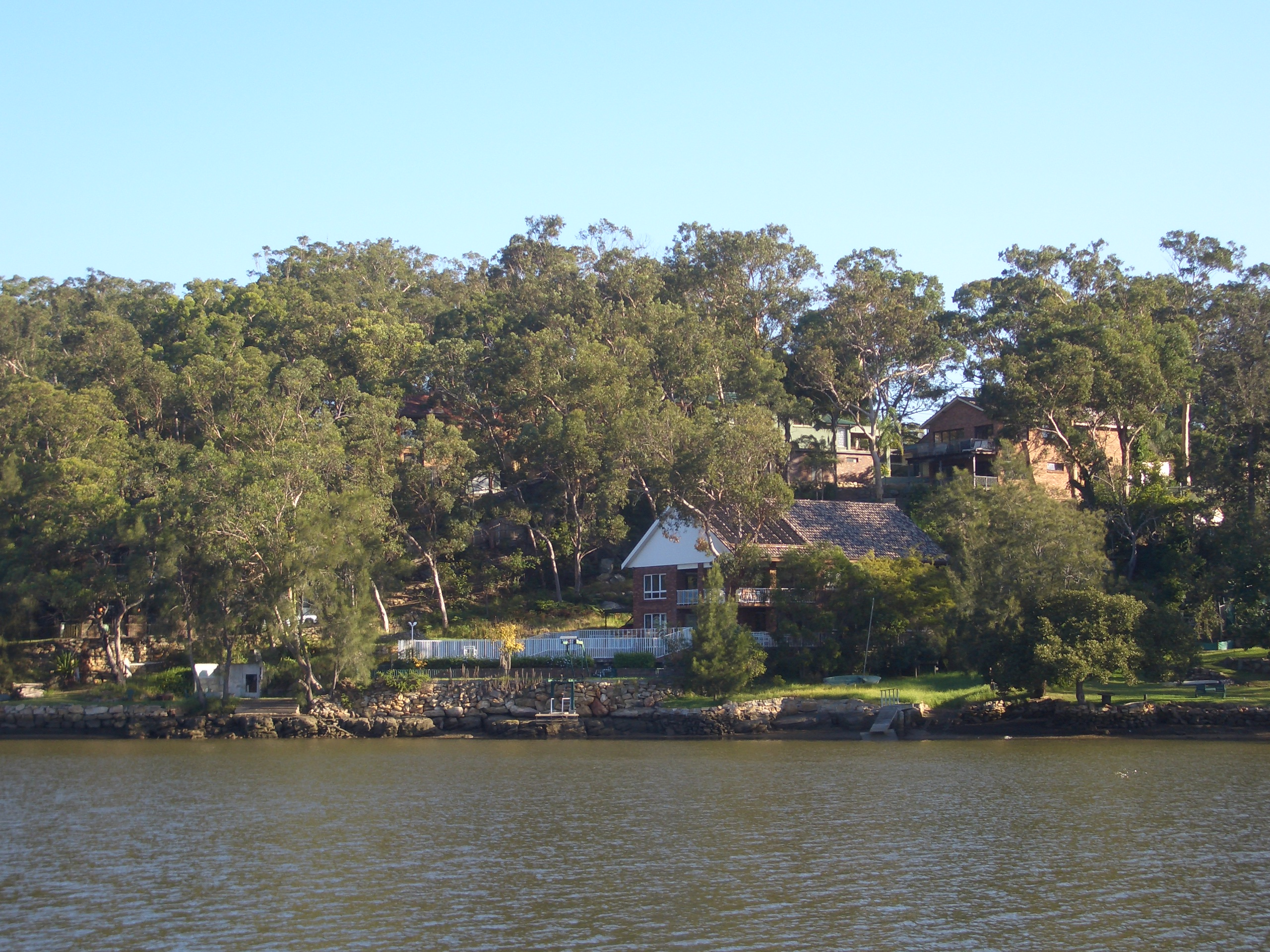
- Sandy Point, view from Picnic Point

- Interactive map of Sandy Point
- Country: Australia
- State: New South Wales
- City: Sydney
- LGA: Sutherland Shire
- Location: 28 km (17 mi) from Sydney CBD

Government
  - State electorate: Holsworthy
  - Federal division: Hughes
- Elevation: 32 m (105 ft)

Population
  - Total: 597 (2021 census)
- Postcode: 2172
Suburbs around Sandy Point
| East Hills | Picnic Point | Picnic Point |
| Pleasure Point | Sandy Point | Picnic Point |
| Holsworthy | Holsworthy | Holsworthy |

Sandy Point is a suburb in south-western Sydney, in the state of New South Wales, Australia 28 km south-west of the Sydney central business district, in the local government area of the Sutherland Shire.

Sandy Point is a geographical formation on the southern bank of the Georges River, east of Deadmans Creek in south-west Sydney. Sandy Point is located in the Sutherland Shire, New South Wales.

The Sandy Point estate was created in 1925 and it was later adopted as the suburb's name. Sandy Point only consists of three streets; St George Crescent, Bingara Drive and Gambier Avenue.

Sandy Point has a Community Hall with squash courts and dancing classes, a Sandy Point Rural Fire Brigade Fire Station, local bus stop, and a park with a playground.

The south-western Sydney suburb is surrounded by bushland in the National Park which is a popular destination for bushwalkers.

Local residents worked together to create a community mural which is now on display at the Community Hall entrance.

== Map of Location ==
Sutherland Shire Council website have an interactive map showing their suburbs, including Sandy Point.

== Newsletter ==
Each house in Sandy Point receives a hard-copy newsletter which contains feature articles, events, advertisements for local businesses and more.

== Sandy Point Progress Association ==
The Sandy Point Progress Association (SPPA) is the local community association providing a forum for discussing local issues that are important to the residents of Sandy Point and lobbying those responsible for change.

Residents have a say in what should be done within the local community. Meetings are 2nd Monday of every Month (except January) at the Sandy Point Community Centre.

== Surrounding communities ==
Holsworthy and Pleasure Point are the adjacent suburbs. Voyager Point is also a neighbouring suburb, along with Hammondville, Wattle Grove, Moorebank, Menai, Lucas Heights, Barden Ridge, Bangor and Alfords Point. Further down and neighbouring is Heathcote, Engadine and Waterfall.

East Hills and Picnic Point are located on the opposite bank of the Georges River. There is currently no vehicle access to cross the river apart from the M5, Newbridge Road or Alford's Point Road. There is a footbridge in Voyager Point connecting East Hills across the river.
