= Picnic Point, New South Wales =

Picnic Point
- Suburb
- Interactive map of Picnic Point
- Country: Australia
- State: New South Wales
- City: Sydney
- LGA: City of Canterbury-Bankstown
- Location: 23 km (14 mi) south-west of Sydney CBD

Government
  - State electorate: East Hills
  - Federal division: Banks
- Elevation: 26 m (85 ft)

Population
  - Total: 6,413 (SAL 2021)
- Postcode: 2213
Suburbs around Picnic Point
East Hills	Panania	Revesby
Pleasure Point	Picnic Point	Revesby Heights
Sandy Point	Padstow	Alfords Point

Picnic Point is a suburb in South-western Sydney in the state of New South Wales, Australia. It is a part of the local government area of City of Canterbury-Bankstown, and is located 23 kilometres south-west of the Sydney central business district. Picnic Point is a residential suburb on the northern bank of the Georges River. Located within Picnic Point is Yeramba Lagoon which is the largest tract of National Park within the Canterbury–Bankstown Council, it is home to numerous species of native fauna and flora.

== History ==
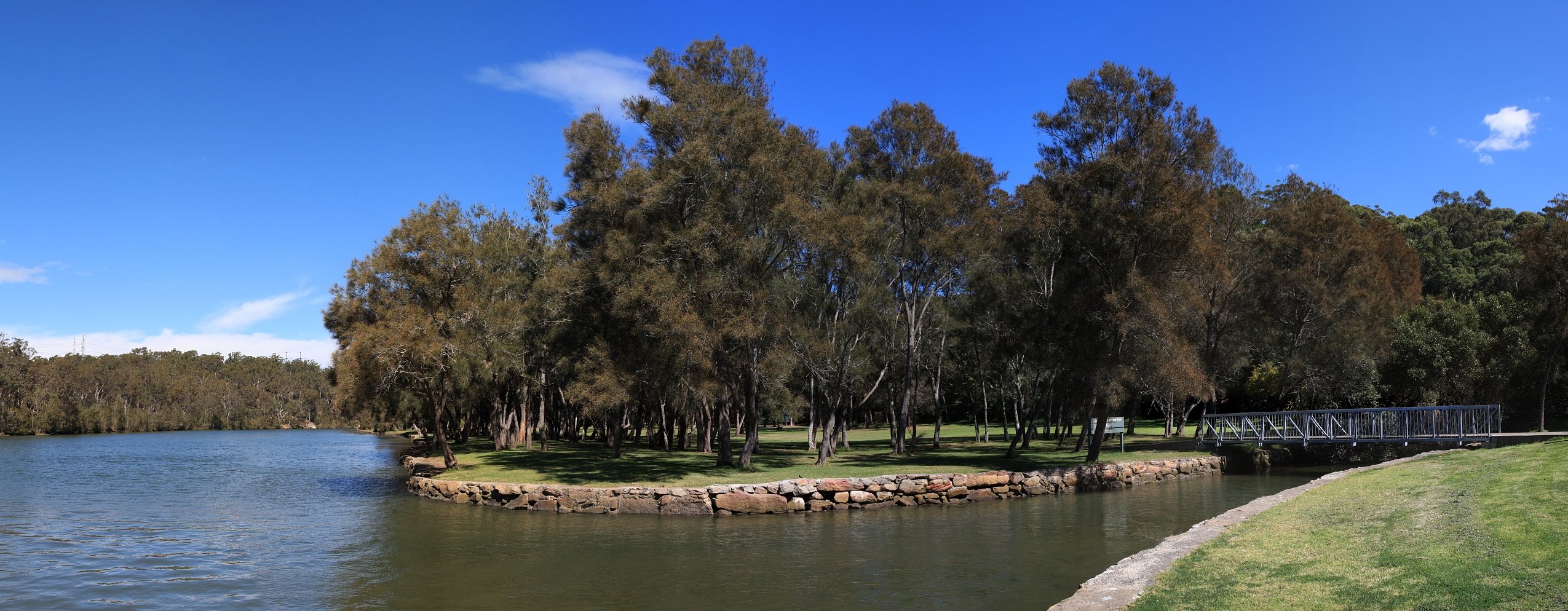
View from Fitzpatrick Park

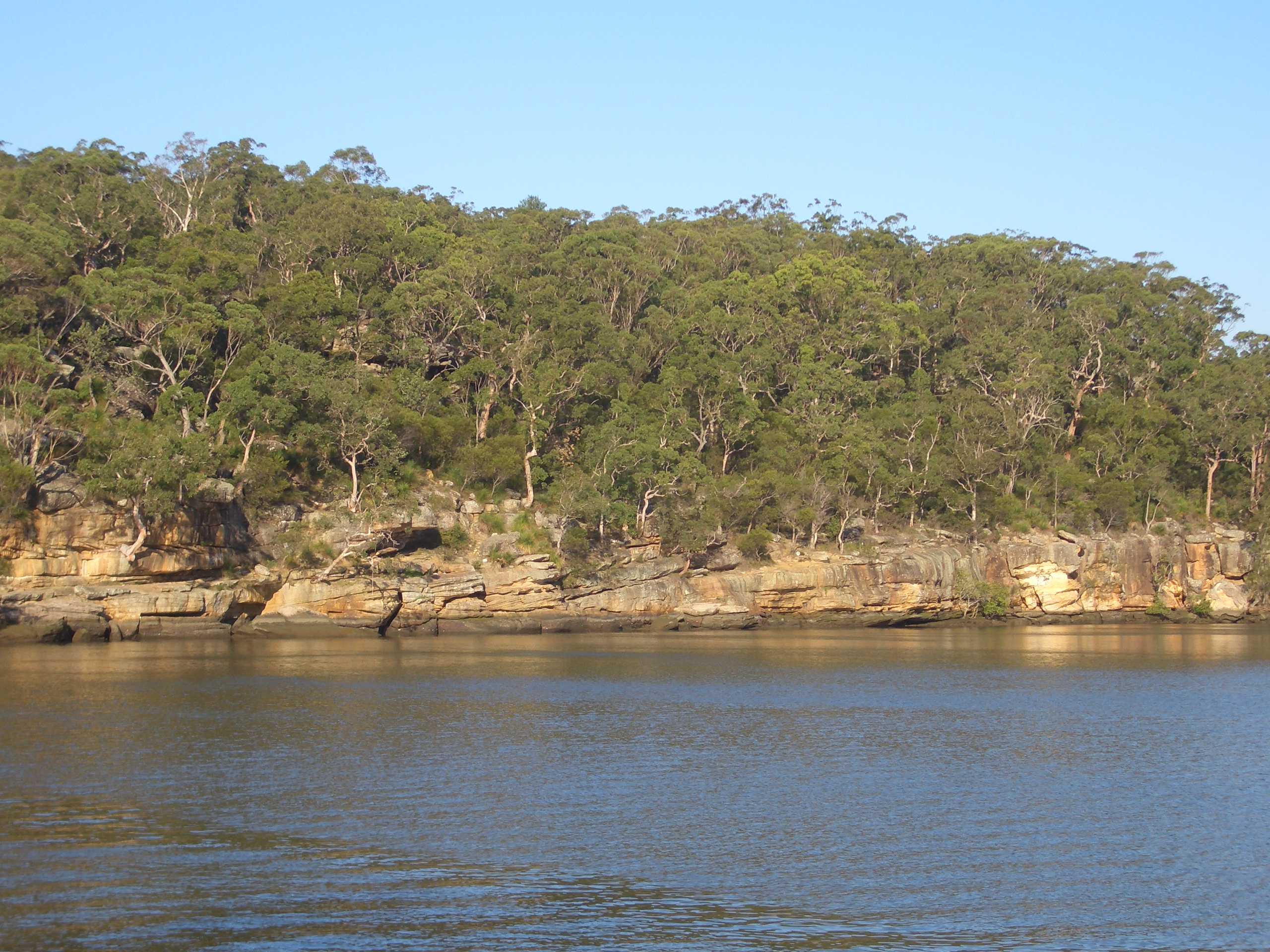
View from Fitzpatrick Park

Picnic Point was the name given to the geographical feature on the Georges River. The suburb was originally part of East Hills, which stretched south from Bankstown to the river and east to The River Road. Picnic Point was gazetted as a suburb in 1975, with new boundaries gazetted in 1994.

During World War II, Picnic Point National Park was the location of a remote receiving station and operations bunker that was owned and operated by the RAAF. This facility was used in conjunction with two other facilities, one of them located in Bankstown, the Bankstown Bunker, which was RAAF headquarters at the time and the other in Bass Hill which was a transmitting station in Johnston Road. The location of the remote receiving station in Picnic Point is now located under the Transgrid South Sydney electricity sub station.

== Schools ==
- Picnic Point High School
- Picnic Point Public School

== Sport and recreation ==
Picnic Point features a number of parks and reserves along the river, including the Georges River National Park. As the suburb's name suggests, the area is popular with picnickers. The boat ramps provide access to the river for boating and watersports such as waterskiing and wakeboarding.
