= Holsworthy, New South Wales =

Holsworthy
- Suburb
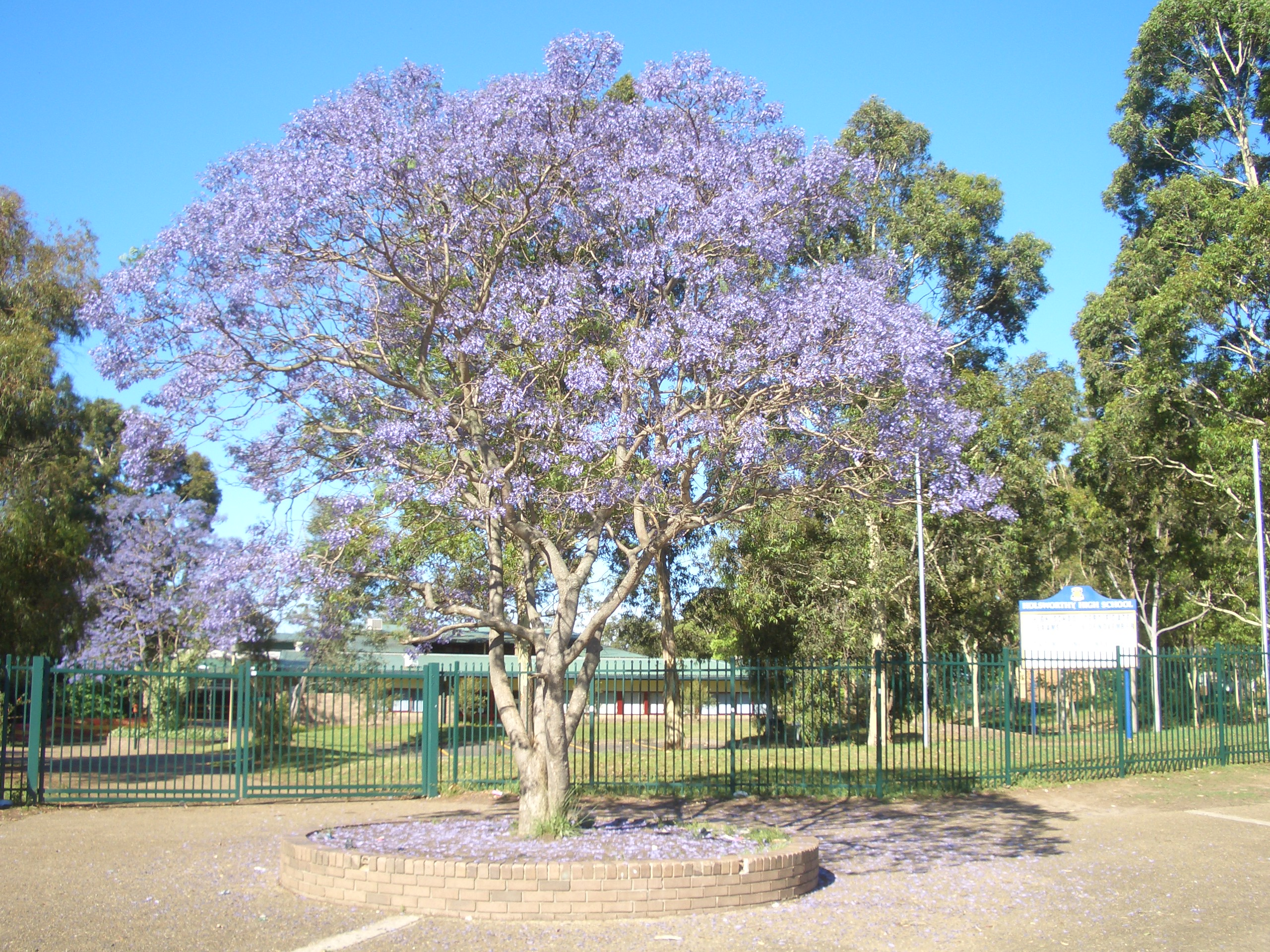
- Holsworthy High School

- Interactive map of Holsworthy
- Country: Australia
- State: New South Wales
- Region: South-Western Sydney
- City: Sydney
- LGAs: City of Liverpool; City of Campbelltown; Sutherland Shire
- Location: 38 km (24 mi) SW of Sydney CBD
- Established: 1835

Government
  - State electorates: Campbelltown; Heathcote; Holsworthy
  - Federal divisions: Hughes; Macarthur

Area
  - Total: 190.3 km^{2} (73.5 sq mi)
- Elevation: 19 m (62 ft)

Population
  - Total: 5,657 (SAL 2021)
- Postcode: 2173

Holsworthy, formerly spelled Holdsworthy, is a suburb in south-western Sydney, in the state of New South Wales, Australia. It is located roughly 38 kilometres south-west of the Sydney central business district. The residential part of the suburb, including the Holsworthy Barracks, is primarily in the local government area of the City of Liverpool. However, most of the vast bushland area in the south is a part of City of Campbelltown, with a portion east of Heathcote in Sutherland Shire.

Holsworthy is best known for the Holsworthy Barracks, a large Australian Army reserve where training exercises frequently occur. The reserve lies adjacent to Heathcote Road, which connects to Bankstown, Liverpool, Lucas Heights, Engadine, and Heathcote. Signs around the perimeter warn potential trespassers about the use of laser-guided and conventional gunfire.

The residential area lies north of the railway station. Anzac Village, situated in the northern part of the suburb and extending into the adjacent suburb of Wattle Grove, features a recent development called 'Mornington.' Additionally, a new shopping centre has been constructed in the area.

== History ==
The area was named after Holsworthy, Devon, England, where Governor Lachlan Macquarie married Elizabeth Campbell on 3 November 1807. It was originally spelt Holdsworthy until after World War II, when the 'd' was dropped.

This land was occupied by the Tharawal people. With the arrival of the First Fleet, indigenous people were pushed back from their traditional lands in the area surrounding Sydney. In 1795, explorers George Bass and Matthew Flinders explored the Georges River, and in 1798, grants of land for farming were made in the area. The soil was good and crops of corn, wheat, and vegetables were soon being harvested.

However, tensions developed with the Tharawal. In 1801, Governor King ordered soldiers to fire on the aborigines to keep them from settler's properties. By 1815, Governor Macquarie declared a state of open warfare against aborigines in the Georges River area and forbade them carrying weapons within a mile of any British settlement. Ultimately, the British prevailed.

A settlement named Eckersley was established in 1835 on what is now military land. By the 1880s, a number of vineyards were established in the area. The land was acquired by the army in 1913. During World War I, it was home to a large internment camp for civilians of German or Austro-Hungarian background. The camp absorbed prisoners from the infamous Torrens Island Concentration Camp in 1915. The modern village of Holsworthy evolved after World War II to the north, with the barracks to the south. The streets are named with a military theme, such as Tarakan, Bardia, Wewak, Lae, Brunei, Finschhafen, Madang, Gona, Anzac, Light Horse, Infantry, Cavalry, Sabre, Gunners Row, and Trooper Row. In Anzac Village, Australian Generals are remembered with Birdwood, Monash, Bridges, and Blamey.

Following World War II, a push was convened to develop suburban areas on the outskirts of Sydney as part of a broader trend of suburban expansion. However, Holsworthy remained somewhat semi-rural during the early post-war years, with agricultural activities still taking place alongside the military presence beside the barracks.

The Holsworthy bushland retains many indigenous sites and has been referred to as "Sydney's Kakadu". There are more than 500 significant Tharawal sites in the area, including campsites, tool-making sites, and rock art. The art is mostly engravings of hands, boomerangs, animals, birds, and fish.

== Climate ==
Holsworthy has a humid subtropical climate (Cfa), like most of Sydney, with warm summers and cool to mild winters, and precipitation spread throughout the year. Thunderstorms are common in the summer months and provide most of the precipitation in that season. Winters are pleasantly cool and sunny, although east coast lows can bring large amounts of rainfall. Snow has never occurred, although frost is a fairly common occurrence in winter. Being inland from the coast and away from Sydney City, Holsworthy receives up to 500mm (20 in) less precipitation than coastal areas, just 25 km (16 mi) away.

Climate data for Holsworthy Control Range
Month	Jan	Feb	Mar	Apr	May	Jun	Jul	Aug	Sep	Oct	Nov	Dec	Year
Record high °C (°F)	45.7 (114.3)	41.7 (107.1)	38.5 (101.3)	33.6 (92.5)	27.7 (81.9)	24.9 (76.8)	24.8 (76.6)	28.9 (84.0)	35.0 (95.0)	37.1 (98.8)	42.0 (107.6)	42.0 (107.6)	45.7 (114.3)
Mean daily maximum °C (°F)	29.1 (84.4)	28.3 (82.9)	26.3 (79.3)	23.5 (74.3)	20.5 (68.9)	17.8 (64.0)	17.3 (63.1)	19.1 (66.4)	22.3 (72.1)	24.1 (75.4)	25.5 (77.9)	27.4 (81.3)	23.4 (74.1)
Mean daily minimum °C (°F)	17.5 (63.5)	17.5 (63.5)	15.5 (59.9)	12.1 (53.8)	8.1 (46.6)	6.2 (43.2)	4.9 (40.8)	5.4 (41.7)	8.4 (47.1)	10.8 (51.4)	13.8 (56.8)	15.7 (60.3)	11.3 (52.3)
Record low °C (°F)	9.2 (48.6)	10.8 (51.4)	6.6 (43.9)	2.8 (37.0)	−2.0 (28.4)	−2.6 (27.3)	−4.0 (24.8)	−2.0 (28.4)	0.8 (33.4)	3.7 (38.7)	5.0 (41.0)	7.0 (44.6)	−4.0 (24.8)
Average precipitation mm (inches)	59.5 (2.34)	113.7 (4.48)	67.4 (2.65)	54.8 (2.16)	53.8 (2.12)	69.1 (2.72)	43.1 (1.70)	37.6 (1.48)	32.6 (1.28)	52.2 (2.06)	73.7 (2.90)	56.6 (2.23)	709.4 (27.93)
Average precipitation days (≥ 0.1mm)	8.7	10.3	11.1	11.2	10.0	10.6	10.1	7.4	7.5	9.5	11.9	10.5	118.8
Average relative humidity (%)	50	56	55	53	52	53	49	44	43	48	51	50	50

== Population ==
According to the 2021 census, Holsworthy had a population of 5,657. There were a high number of families with children (63.4%), and the median age of Holsworthy residents (31) was seven years younger than the national median. Defence was a major industry of employment, covering 16.7% of the suburb's residents. The median family income ($2,660 per week) was substantially higher than the national median ($2,120).

59.9% of people were born in Australia; the next most common countries of birth included India 8.2%, the Philippines 2.8%, Bangladesh 2.4%, China (excluding Special Administrative Regions (SARs) and Taiwan) 2.3%, and New Zealand 1.8%. 56.7% of people only spoke English at home; other languages spoken at home included Hindi 3.3%, Bengali 3.2%, Mandarin 2.8%, Arabic 2.4%, and Malayalam 2.3%. The most common responses for religion were No Religion 27.4%, Catholic 21.5%, Hinduism 12.2%, and Anglican 8.4%; a further 7.1% of respondents for this area elected not to disclose their religious status.

== Transport ==
- Holsworthy railway station is on the East Hills railway line. The railway station was opened in 1987 when the East Hills Line was extended to Glenfield and Campbelltown.

== Pop culture ==
- The Black Balloon, a film starring Toni Collette, Gemma Ward, Erik Thomson and Luke Ford, was filmed in Holsworthy.

== Churches ==
A congregation of Lifegate Community Church (Holsworthy & Wattle Grove) meets weekly in the Wattle Grove Primary Public School Hall on Cressbrook Drive.

St. Christopher's Catholic Church at Holsworthy also services the Holsworthy and Wattle Grove areas.
