= Bardwell Creek =

Watercourse in Sydney, New South Wales, Australia

Coordinates: 33°57′S 151°07′E

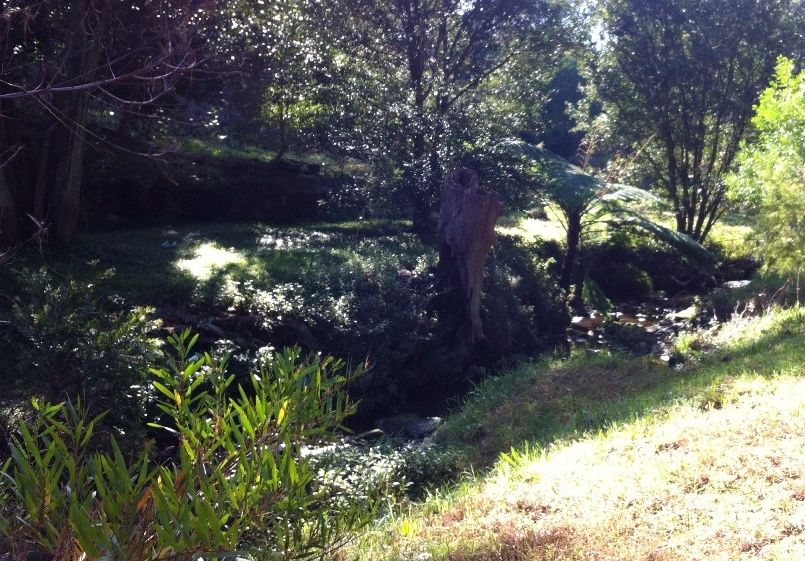
- Bardwell Creek, near Ellerslie Road Bexley North.

Location
- Country: Australia
- State: New South Wales
- IBRA: Sydney Basin, St George
- District: Southern Sydney
- Municipalities: Bayside, Georges River

Physical characteristics
- Source
  - location: near Beverly Hills railway station
- Mouth: confluence with Wolli Creek
  - location: Turrella
- Length: 4 km (2.5 mi)
- Basin size: 6.36 km^{2} (2.46 sq mi)

Basin features
- River system: Cooks River catchment
- Nature Reserve: Wolli Creek Regional Park

Bardwell Creek, an urban watercourse of the Cooks River catchment, is located in the southern suburbs of Sydney, in New South Wales, Australia.

== Course and features ==
Bardwell Creek rises in Georges River local government area, near Hurstville and flows in a north-easterly direction through the suburbs of Bexley, Bexley North, Bardwell Park, and Turrella in the Bayside local government area, where it makes its confluence with Wolli Creek, where it forms the border between the suburbs of Bardwell Park and Turrella. The upper reaches of the Creek are a piped drainage system, which becomes an open concrete channel at Croydon Road in the Bexley Golf Course. The total catchment area of Bardwell Creek is 6.36 square kilometres (2.46 sq mi).

== See also ==
- Bardwell Valley, New South Wales
- Wolli Creek Regional Park
