= Bardwell =

Bardwell may refer to:

== Places ==
=== Australia ===
- Bardwell Park, New South Wales
- Bardwell Valley, New South Wales
- Bardwell Park railway station, Sydney

=== United Kingdom ===
- Bardwell Road
- Bardwell, Suffolk
  - Bardwell Windmill, a tower mill

=== United States ===
- Bardwell, Texas
  - Lake Bardwell
- Bardwell, Kentucky
- Bardwell, Wisconsin, the most populous Bardwell in the US
- Bardwell's Ferry Bridge, an 1882 lenticular truss bridge in Massachusetts

== People with the surname ==
- Bardwell (surname)

== See also ==
- 1615 Bardwell, an asteroid discovered at Goethe Link Observatory
