= Wolli Creek Regional Park =

Natural area in Sydney, New South Wales, Australia

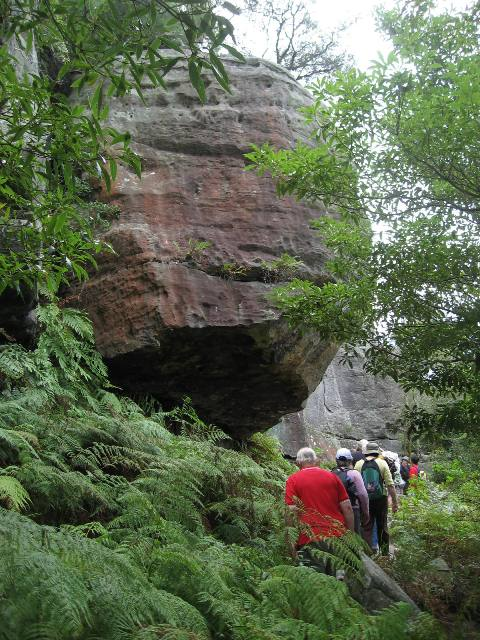
- Sandstone Outcrop along Two Valley Trail
- Interactive map of Wolli Creek Regional Park
- Type: Nature reserve
- Location: Sydney, New South Wales, Australia
- Nearest city: Rockdale
- Coordinates: 33°56′S 151°08′E
- Area: 50 hectares (120 acres)
- Operator: NSW National Parks & Wildlife Service
- Status: Open

Wolli Creek Regional Park

The Wolli Creek Regional Park is a 50 hectares (120 acres) regional park, located adjacent to Wolli Creek within the Wolli Creek Valley, between Bexley North and Tempe in south-west Sydney, New South Wales, Australia.

The park was announced by the Government of New South Wales in 1998 as a result of sustained community campaigning for the area to be preserved and for the M5 East Freeway to go underground. Whilst some of the park has been formed and management handed over from local government authorities to the NSW National Parks & Wildlife Service, including the 8.9 hectares (22 acres) Girrahween Park, Turrella Reserve, and some privately held land that was compulsorily acquired, some areas of the originally planned park remain in the hands of government agencies including Sydney Water and Roads & Maritime Services.

When complete, the planned nature reserve will offer public transport access, family picnic areas, extensive views and bushland, sandstone escarpments with walking tracks, a mixture of parkland, heathland, and woodland forest, and birdwatching in close proximity to heavily developed residential and industrial landscape.

The park supports a diversity of native plants and animals, including birds and grey-headed flying foxes, and provides recreational opportunities for local residents and visitors. To get there, visitors can ride their bike or take public transport. It is close to Turrella and Bardwell Park stations.

== History ==
In Pre-European times the Wolli Valley was home to the Bidjigal clan who relied on the bushland for food and shelter. After European settlement land uses began to affect the ecology of the area by drastically changing the animals and plants found here. Trees were cut down and the cleared land used for orchards, market gardens, dairies, poultry and pig farming. Later European settlement affected the landforms of the area. The land was used for noxious industries such as making tallow from animal carcasses and wool scouring. The construction of the Illawarra railway in 1882 altered the flow of Wolli Creek and caused floodwater to drain into it. In 1890 construction of a sewer network began for the drainage of Sydney's suburbs. Small scale stone quarrying on the Earlwood side of Wolli Creek occurred during the 19th and early 20th Century and the sandstone was used for local buildings. The old quarry is located in the bushland below Highcliff Road, east of Turrella Reserve. A dam was built on the Cooks River at Tempe which caused problems in the flow of Cooks River and Wolli Creek. These historical land uses have resulted in changes to flow regimes, soils and vegetation within the park.

== Location ==
Wolli Creek regional park is located in an area of medium to low density housing mixed with industrial and commercial landholding. Parts of the park are steep and the land was unsuitable for housing, therefore native bushland was left undisturbed. A rail corridor runs parallel with the Park on the south side of Wolli Creek and Sydney Airport is 1 km away with aircraft and train noise affecting the park. Wolli Creek itself is not included in the Regional Park. The surrounding urban land use negatively impacts on the park with weed invasion, stormwater runoff, rubbish dumping and the presence of feral and introduced animals.

== Management ==
The Regional Park consists of bushland of varying quality (some of it very high quality), as well as wetlands, open grass, mangroves and endangered saltmarsh communities. The native plants here are remnants of the flora that existed in the Sydney region before European settlement. This type of bushland is extremely rare in the inner city areas of Sydney and should be declared an endangered ecological community In order to effectively manage the biodiversity of the Park, it is important know what plants and animal species exist here. In the past only snap shot type surveys have been done. Opportunities exist for volunteers to help with surveys of the Park's animal and plant species.

Fragmentation of habitat is the number one threat to biodiversity. Currently this Regional Park is an isolated fragment of habitat amidst the urban matrix. Linking up parks and reserves with habitat corridors is an effective way to help animals move into the area and stop the local extinction of species. It is hoped that as the habitat quality of the Park improves (and habitat corridors increase within urban Sydney), more animal species will be found here. Future planning and management of the Park will focus on ensuring long term maintenance and enhancement (where appropriate) of the Park's biodiversity. It is critical to undertake co-operative vegetation management with adjoining property managers (local council, private landowners, CityRail, Sydney Water) and to establish connections to the wider web of natural environments, especially canopy connections.

The National Parks and wildlife service (NPWS) is strongly focussed on the regeneration and enhancement of the Park's natural systems. Management of the Park will consolidate and conserve the existing quality habitats and communities (particularly the bushland) and provide refuges for fauna in undisturbed areas of Park. There is a need to ensure all park management activities minimise the impact on fauna habitat. This regional park is important sanctuary for biodiversity.

The vegetation of the park along Wolli Creek is maintained by the Wolli Creek Preservation Society whose volunteers engage in a variety of activities, including bush regeneration.

== Flora ==
The flora of the area has around 360 species of native plants identified, including tassell sedge (Carex fascicularis) which is uncommon in the Sydney Basin. There is still much that has not been exhaustively searched; in 2015 there was the discovery of a number of regenerating woody pear (Xylomelum pyriforme) seedlings with a mature plant nearby.

There are several remnant vegetation communities within the Regional park which are listed below:

A Eucalypt woodland: Sydney Sandstone Gully Complex community 10ag

Located at Girahween Park. It comprises smooth-barked apple (Angophora costata), blackbutt (Eucalyptus pilularis), Sydney peppermint (Eucalyptus piperita), red bloodwood (Eucalyptus gummifera) and turpentine (Syncarpia glomulifera). There is a varied understorey with banksia (Banksia serrata), teatree (Leptospurmum polygalifolium), sunshine wattle (Acacia terminalis). On shallow rock outcrops and ridgelines, thickets of tick bush (Kunzea ambigua) are dominant.

Closed-forest community: sub category of the Sydney Sandstone Gully Complex 10ag

Occurs adjacent to Wolli Creek in the western end of the park. Characterised by coachwood (Ceratopetalum apetalum) and water gum (Tristaniopsis laurina).

Mangroves and associated endangered saltmarsh communities: Estuarine Complex 4a

Occur on the banks of Wolli Creek downstream of Turrella, at Henderson Weir. Saltmarsh are listed as threatened communities under the Threatened Species Conservation Act 1995 (NSW).

Freshwater wetland

One remnant wetland (offstream) survives upstream of Hartill Law Avenue, although it is threatened by active weed invasion. The remaining creekline vegetation within the freshwater sections of Wolli Creek are dominated by exotic species.

=== Threats to Native Plants ===
Within the wetland saltmarsh communities are under pressure from expanding areas of mangrove plants and negative impacts of urban land use. Weed species occupy many areas especially close to Wolli Creek and take over from the native vegetation. Invasive and noxious species include the wandering jew (Tradescantia fluminensis), blackberry (Rubus fruticosus) and lantana (Lantana Camara), which is listed as a key threatening process in Schedule 3 of the NSW Threatened Species Conservation Act 1995. The main threat from exotic plants is from vine species (because they threaten tree canopies), grasses such as kikuyu (Pennisetum clandestinum) which can smother saltmarshes, and invasion of saline areas and reed beds by spiny rush (Juncus acutus), alligator weed (Alternanthera philoxeriodes) and ludwigia (Ludwigia peruviana). Weed removal continues slowly as part of the bush regeneration work.

== Fauna ==
=== Amphibians ===
Frogs are under threat worldwide. A survey within the area predicted certain common frog species would be present because the area is within their range, however these species were universally absent. Fewer than half of the original frog species remain in the Park and seven species have become locally extinct. One of these locally extinct frogs is the Green and Golden Bell Frog (Endangered in NSW under the Threatened Species Conservation Act). It is no longer found here due to the loss of habitat. The Regional Park is in a very degraded landscape and changing ecosystem dynamics has perhaps favoured one species over another, with the Brown Striped Marsh Frog (Limnodynastes peronii) displacing the Green and Golden Bell Frog (Litoria aurea). The degraded wetlands found within the Park have high siltation and shallow thickly vegetated habitat which is favoured by Striped Marsh Frogs (Schell & Bergin 2003) whereas the Green and Golden Bell Frog needs deeper water bodies with less dense fringing vegetation. The frog species identified in the area for the period between 1997 and 2004 are the Eastern Dwarf Tree Frog (Litoria fallax), Peron's Tree Frog (Litoria peronii), Green Tree Frog (Litoria caerulea), Common Eastern Froglet (Crinia signifera) and the Brown Striped Marsh Frog (Limnodynastes peronii) There may be more species of frog as yet unrecorded within the Park and further studies are needed. It is important to find out whether the Green and Golden Bell Frog has re-established a population from nearby populations living along the lower Cooks River.

=== Reptiles ===
==== Lizards, geckos, dragons and skinks ====
The species found here include eastern blue-tongue lizard (Tiliqua scincoides), jacky lizard (Amphibolurus muricatus), eastern water dragon (Physignathus lesueurii) and broad-tailed gecko (Phyllurus platurus).

A number of skink species are still extant, including the bar-sided skink (Eulamprus tenuis), eastern water skink (Eulamprus quoyii) and copper-tailed skink (Ctenotus taeniolatus). Both grey-brown and yellow dragons have been observed near Nannygoat Hill.

==== Snakes ====
Red-bellied black snake (Pseudechis porphyriacus) is the only snake species recently seen within the Park. Other snake species which have been historically recorded (but not sighted in recent times) include, the black-bellied swamp snake (Hemiaspis signata) and the eastern brown snake (Pseudonaja textilis).

==== Turtles ====
The eastern long-necked turtle (Chelodina longicollis) is the only turtle species found within the park. Despite being widespread in highly modified Sydney water catchments, urban populations are not well understood. The species is able to utilise modern urbanised waterways successfully compared with other Australian freshwater turtles because it has a preference for shallow and ephemeral bodies of water. It is highly mobile species and able to migrate overland after rain. Hatchlings have been observed at a large distance from the creek and they often have trouble moving through the introduced Kikuyu Grasses (Pennisetum clandestinum). Although this species has the ability to disperse, more bodies of water are being lost due to a continuing demand for urban consolidation and habitat connectivity between populations is low. The future for these taxa in urban Sydney is precarious because of the degraded urban environment (with continual loss of habitat), low recruitment to the population and the risk of predation.

=== Mammals ===
The common brushtail possum (Trichosurus vulpecula), and microbat species, Gould's wattled bat (Chalinolobus gouldii) and the common bent-wing bat (Miniopterus schreibersii), appeared to be the only surviving native mammals in the area.

In 2007, a grey-headed flying-fox (Pteropus poliocephalus) camp was established on the south side of Wolli Creek in an area not easily accessible to the public. The camp initially involved 1,000 animals, the population has increased and, as at 2016, up to 20,000 individuals may be present at the site at different times of year. The grey-headed flying-fox is listed as Vulnerable on Schedule 2 of the NSW Threatened Species Conservation Act 1995 and is listed as Vulnerable under the Commonwealth Environment Protection and Biodiversity Conservation Act 1999. Due to habitat destruction and an increased food availability in cities, bat camps are increasingly common in urban areas, causing conflict with humans due to noise and the destruction of fruit trees.

Occasional suggestive diggings in the Wolli Valley area have not yet confirmed the presence of the long-nosed bandicoot (Perameles nasuta). This species is listed as endangered under the NSW Threatened Species Conservation Act 1995. A population survives in suburbs adjoining the Regional Park. They are threatened by foxes and risks associated with urbanisation such as danger from traffic.

=== Introduced animals ===
Foxes, cats, rabbits, house mice and black rats have been observed on this reserve. These introduced animals may have modified the biological community over the long period of their occupation. Some native animal and plant species may have been eliminated from this reserve due to predation and competition from introduced species. The risk of local extinctions continues with the presence of foxes. Foxes have been listed as a key threatening process under the Threatened Species Conservation Act 1995.

=== Birds ===
Many species of birds of eucalypt woodlands of southern Australia are declining in numbers. There are many causes of this decline; clearing, fragmentation and degradation of woodlands. These factors combine with ecological factors such as difficulties in dispersing among remnants, interspecific competition, nest predation, and decline resources, such as food. Management, especially rehabilitation and revegetation, may assist some woodland birds with common species responding well, but bird species that require mature trees do not. This Regional Park forms part of an important west–east corridor of habitat for avian migrants. The Park is a significant connecting habitat link for birds moving across Sydney's urban south and for migrants moving in a north–south direction. Newly established breeding residents include the Nankeen night heron (Nycticorax caledonicus) and the Variegated fairy wren (Malurus lamberti).

Sightings of the powerful owl (Ninox strenua) are rare within the Park; an adult was discovered soon after the establishment of the grey-headed flying fox camp. It is estimated that the total number of adult powerful owls within the Sydney urban landscape is 120. The habitat quality and the population of mammal species is increasing in the park. It is hoped that a pair will soon breed here. Powerful owls feed almost exclusively on large tree-dwelling mammals, especially the common ringtail possum and the grey–headed flying-fox, but they also take a few large birds. The Sydney population often nests near bushwalking pathways and has successfully raised chicks in areas of high human disturbance. Powerful owls prefer native trees but will also use trees considered weed species. To conserve the Powerful Owl, we need to be aware of the habitat it uses and whether numbers are increasing or decreasing.

== Recreation ==
Bushwalkers and birdwatchers can enjoy the valley using the Two Valley Trail, and reserves such as Girrawheen Park and Turrella Reserve for picnics and other recreational activities. Access to the park is available through adjacent suburban streets and railway stations located at Tempe, Turrella, Bardwell Park, and Bexley North.

== Gallery ==
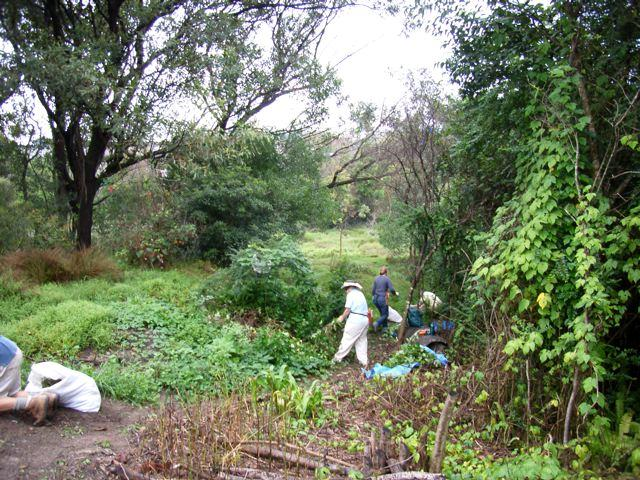
Bush regeneration Bray Avenue, Earlwood

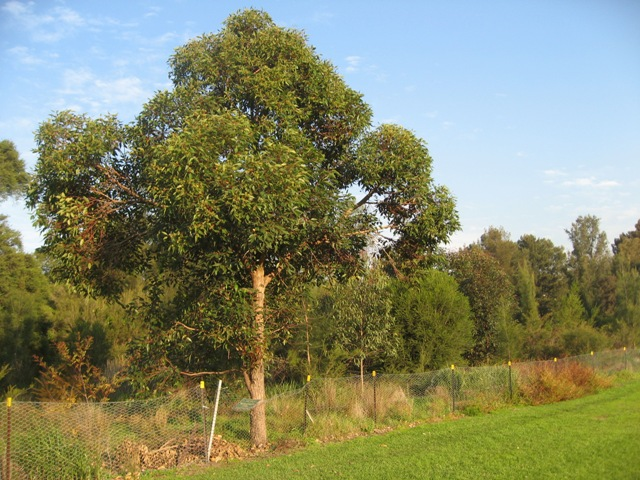
Bush regeneration planting site along Wolli Creek, Turrella Reserve
