= Bardwell (surname) =

Bardwell is a surname. Notable people with the surname include:

- Elisabeth Bardwell (1831–1899), American astronomer
- Keith Bardwell, former Louisiana justice of the peace who refused to officiate a wedding in the 2009 Louisiana interracial marriage incident
- Leland Bardwell (1922–2016), Irish poet, novelist and playwright
- Robert Bardwell, former Jacobs Field organist
- Sherman Bardwell (1828–1900), American politician
- Tennyson Bardwell, writer/director
- Thomas Bardwell (1704–1767), English portrait and figure painter, art copyist, and writer
- William Bardwell (disambiguation)

== Fictional characters ==
- Gloria Abbott Bardwell, fictional character
- Jeffrey & William Bardwell, twin fictional characters in the CBS soap opera The Young and the Restless
