= Turrella =

- Suburb
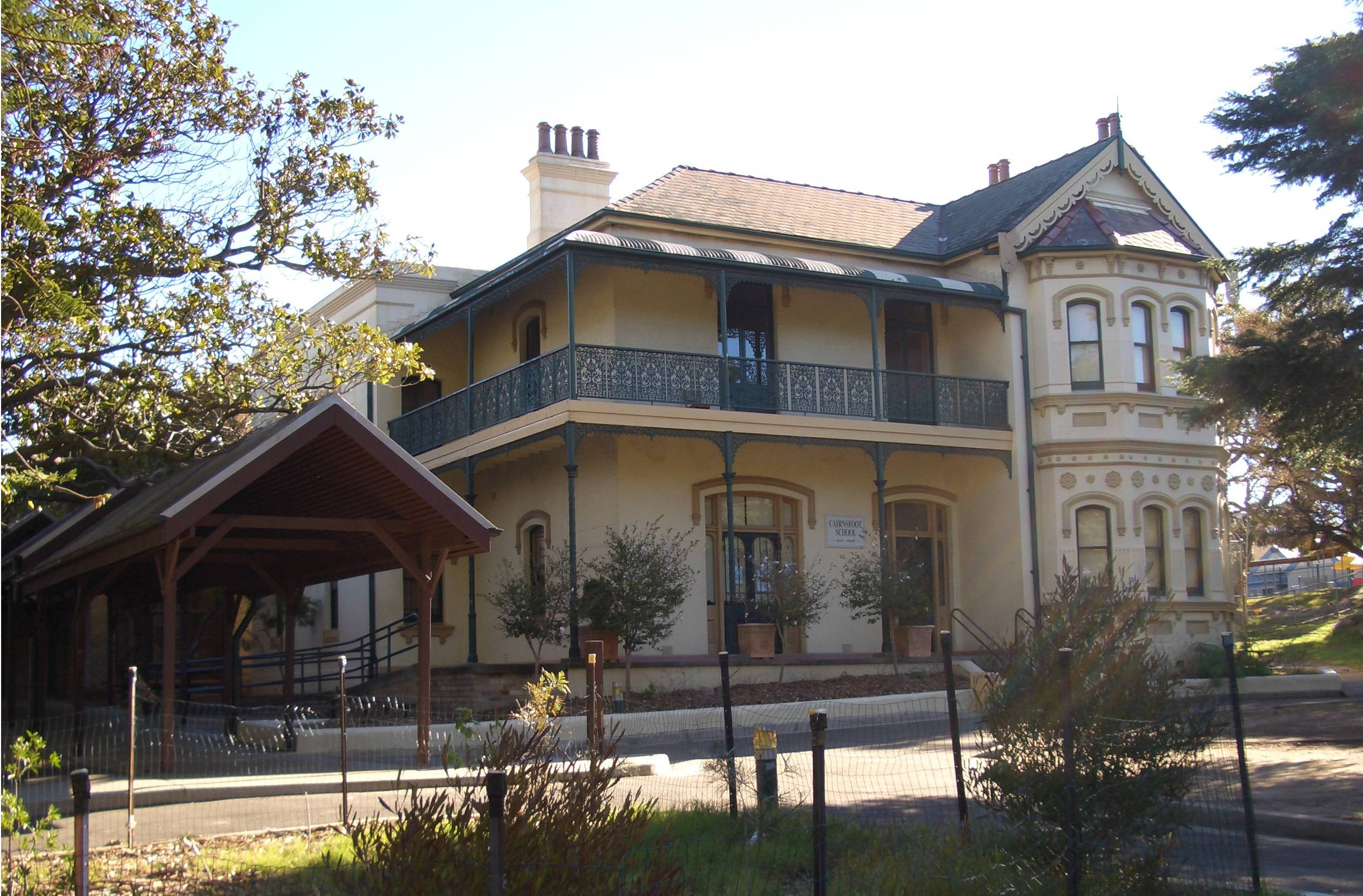
- Cairnsfoot, Loftus Street c. 2005

- Interactive map of Turrella
- Country: Australia
- State: New South Wales
- City: Sydney
- LGA: Bayside Council
- Location: 10 km (6.2 mi) south-west of Sydney CBD

Government
  - State electorate: Rockdale
  - Federal division: Barton
- Elevation: 15 m (49 ft)

Population
  - Total: 2,673 (2021 census)
- Postcode: 2205
Suburbs around Turrella
Earlwood	Earlwood	Tempe
Bardwell Park	Turrella	Wolli Creek
Bardwell Valley	Arncliffe	Arncliffe

Turrella (/tərɛlə/) is a suburb in southern Sydney, in the state of New South Wales, Australia. Turrella is located 10 km south-west of the Sydney central business district on the southern bank of Wolli Creek in the local government area of Bayside Council.

Turrella is a mostly residential area. Some light industrial developments are located around Turrella railway station and north along the railway line. A footbridge from Turrella over Wolli Creek links Henderson Street to the eastern side of Earlwood, formerly known as Undercliffe. The footbridge was closed in 2012 by Canterbury Council after it was deemed to be structurally unsound but was repaired and re-opened in November 2013.

== History ==
In 1842, William Favell and his wife Eleanor were farming a property named Hillside on this site. Their neighbours were the families of Thomas Curtis and Henry Blackwell, who were orchardists and gardeners. The farms and orchards were subdivided when the railway came through. The railway station opened on 21 September 1931. The light industrial buildings were built close to the railway line and one of the biggest factories in the area was the Streets Ice Cream factory, which has since closed.

The post office was originally known as West Arncliffe when it opened on 26 April 1933 but in January 1948 became known as Arncliffe West. It became Turrella in August 1952 but closed on 21 December 1970.

=== Historical places ===
Turrella borders a piece of remnant bushland, the Wolli Creek Valley, beside Wolli Creek. There have been active movements fighting for its preservation in the face of demands for land. The most successful of these prevented the building of the M5 South Western Motorway through the valley, resulting in the road being built as a tunnel under the valley known as the M5 East. Nevertheless, community concern remains over plans to extend the M5 at Bexley.

Turrella also has a number of heritage-listed sites, including:

- 18 Loftus Street: Cairnsfoot
- Thompson Street: Wolli Creek Aqueduct

== Demographics ==
At the 2021 Census, the population of Turrella was 2,673. The most common ancestries were Lebanese 15.5%, Chinese 13.6%, Australian 13.3%, English 13.2% and Macedonian 5.1%. 45.0% of people were born in Australia. The most common other countries of birth were China 6.4% and Lebanon 5.8%. 36.4% of people only spoke English at home. Other languages spoken at home included Arabic 16.2%, Mandarin 6.3%, Spanish 5.3%, Macedonian 4.4% and Cantonese 3.4%. The most common responses for religion in Turrella were No Religion 28.6%, Islam 21.2% and Catholic 18.0%.

== Schools ==
Arncliffe West Infants School is located in Loftus Street. The former Cairnsfoot Special School premises is located opposite. The original Cairnsfoot building is heritage listed.

== Transport ==
Turrella railway station is on the Airport & South Line of the Sydney Trains network. Turrella is also serviced by Transit Systems bus route 473 which runs from Rockdale station to Campsie station via Bardwell Valley, Arncliffe, Turrella, Bardwell Park station, Earlwood and Clemton Park.

The M5 South Western Motorway runs beneath parts of Turrella, in a 4 km tunnel. The nearest entrances to travel south-west towards Beverly Hills and Liverpool are located at Arncliffe and Bexley North. The nearest entrances to travel north-east towards Botany and the city are located at Arncliffe.

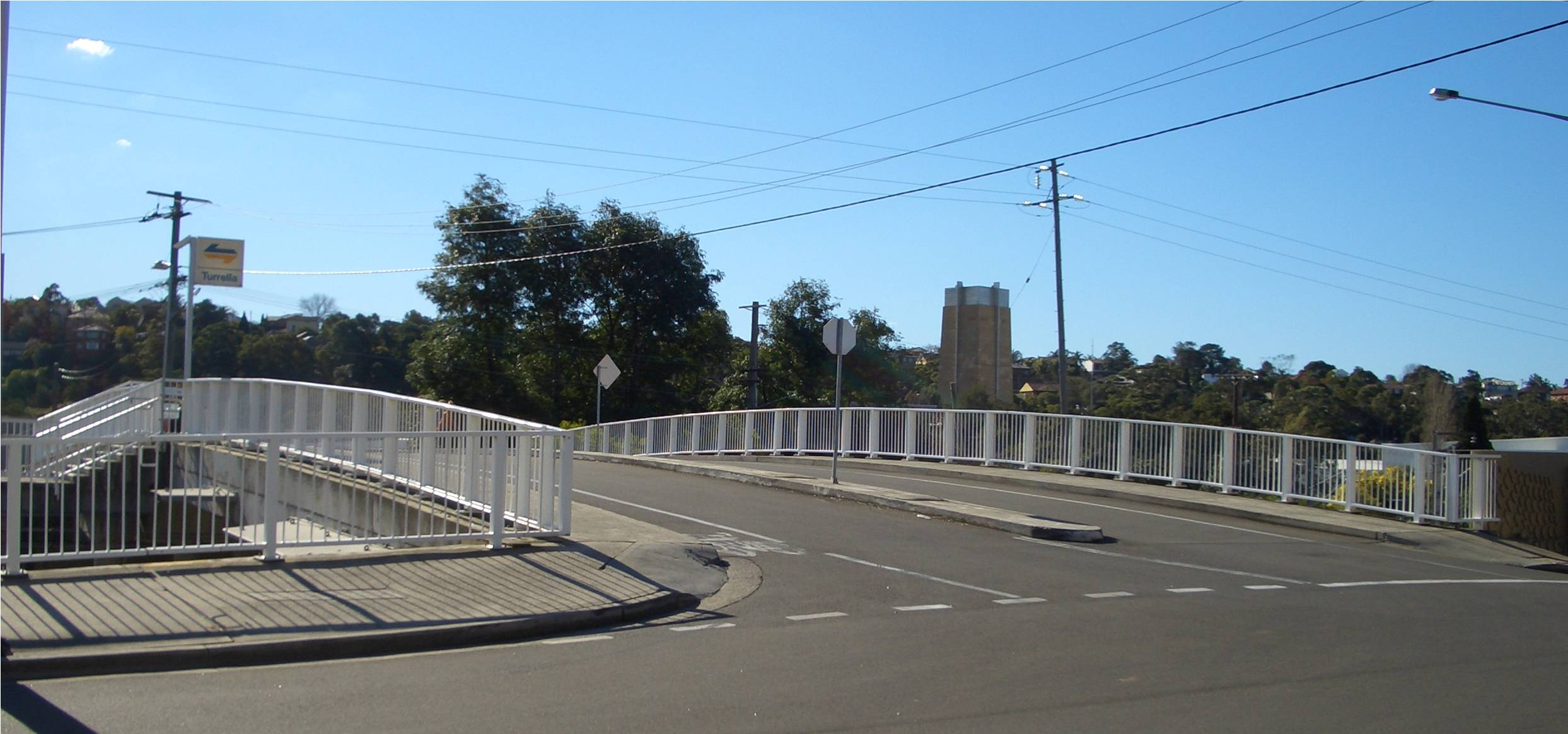
Turrella railway bridge

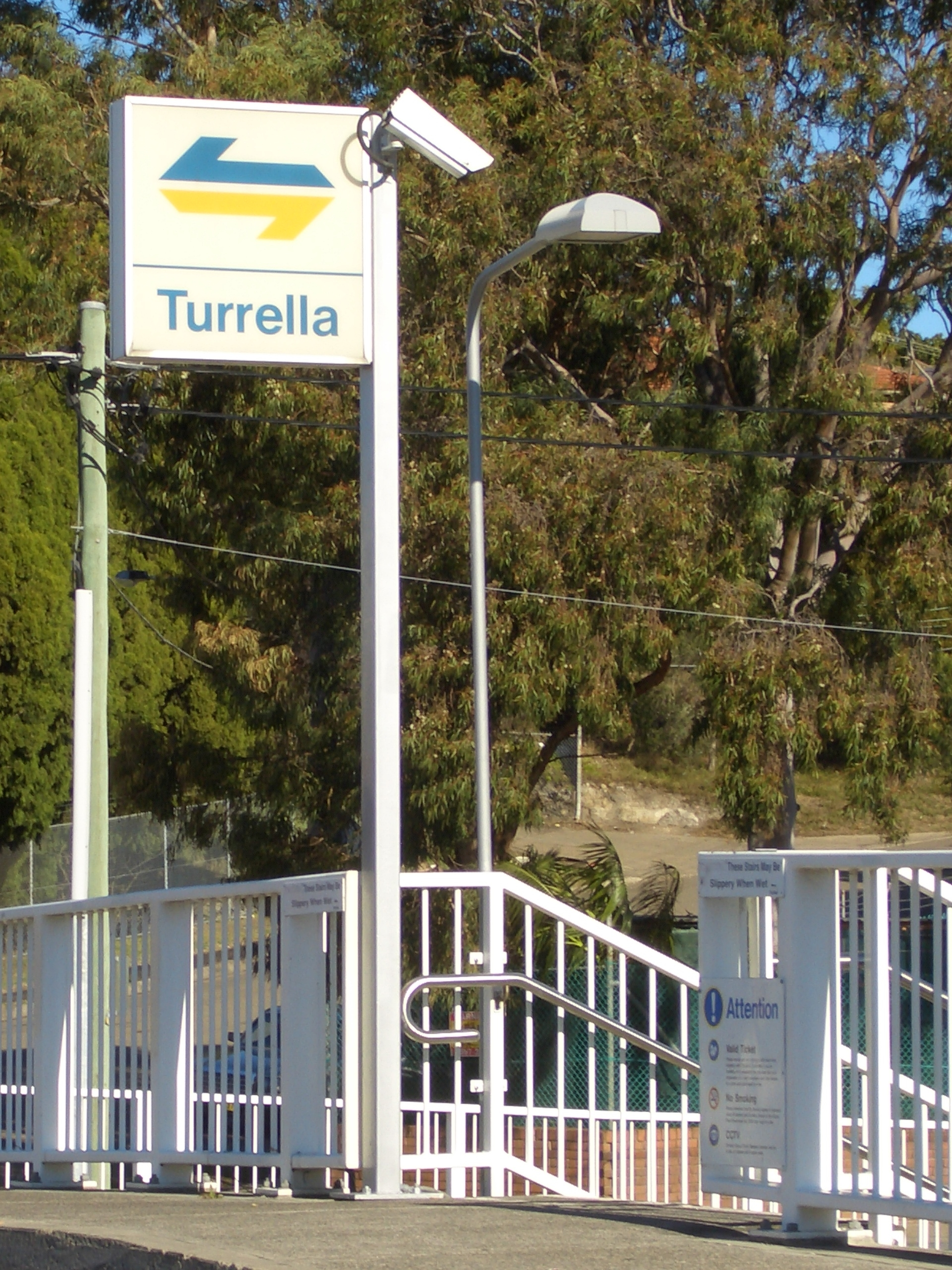
Turrella railway station entrance

== Notable residents ==
- Chris Flannery, hitman in the Sydney underworld in the 1980s.
