= Bexley North railway station =

Railway station in Sydney, New South Wales, Australia

Bexley North
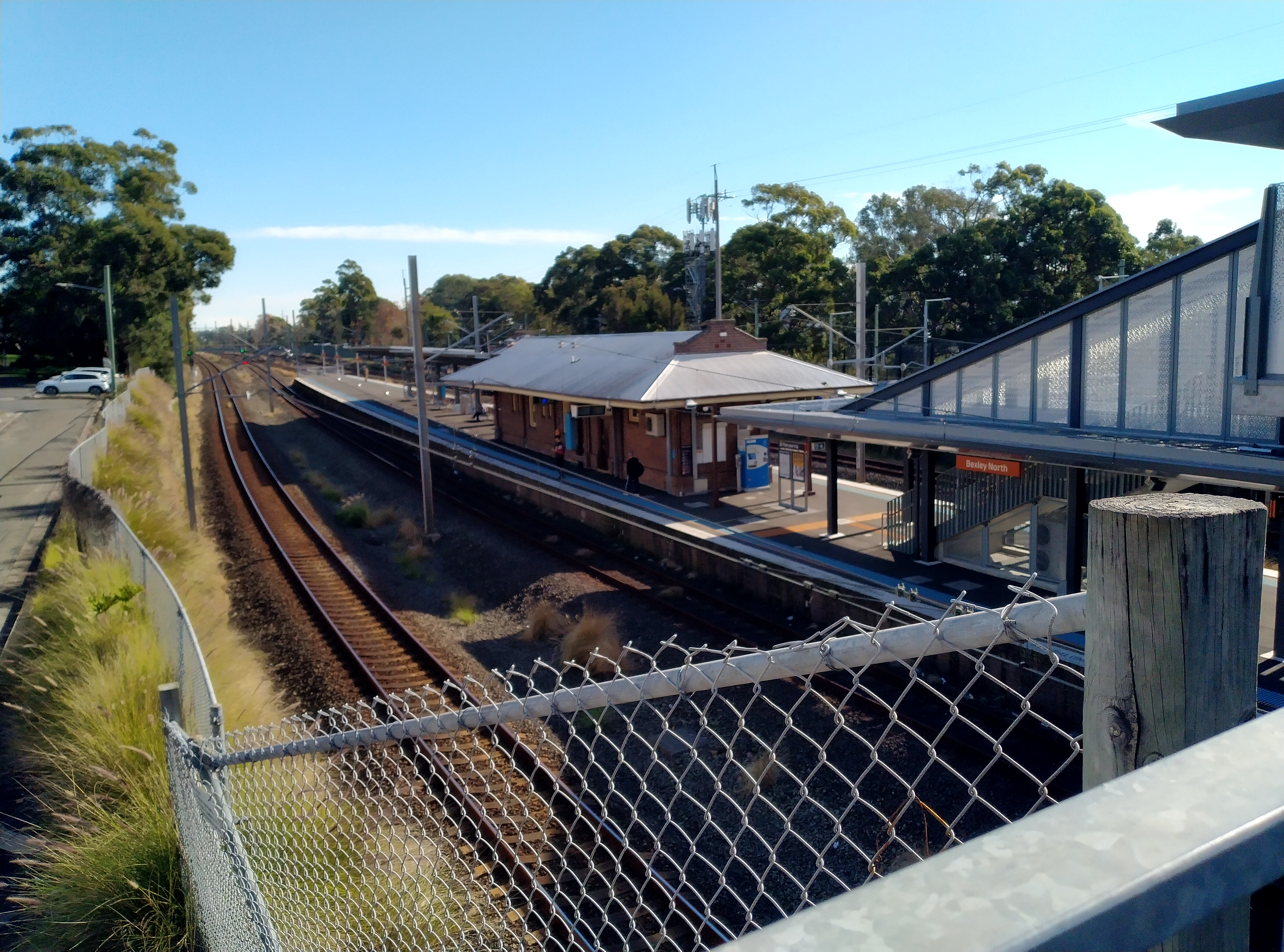
- Westbound view of platform and building in June 2024

General information
- Location: Bexley Road, Bexley North; Sydney, New South Wales
- Coordinates: 33°56′15″S 151°06′47″E
- Owner: Transport Asset Manager of NSW
- Operator: Sydney Trains
- Line: East Hills
- Distance: 11.37 km (7.06 mi) from Central
- Platforms: 2 (1 island)
- Tracks: 4
- Connections: Bus

Construction
- Structure type: Ground
- Accessible: Yes

Other information
- Status: Weekdays: Staffed: 6am to 2pm: Weekends and public holidays: Unstaffed
- Station code: BXN
- Website: Transport for NSW

History
- Opened: 21 September 1931 (94 years ago)
- Electrified: Yes (from opening)

Passengers
- 2025: 682,326 (year); 1,869 (daily) (Sydney Trains)
- Rank: 143

Services
Preceding station	Sydney Trains	Following station
Kingsgrove towards Revesby or Macarthur	Airport & South Line	Bardwell Park towards City Circle
Location

Bexley North railway station is a suburban railway station located on the East Hills line, serving the Sydney suburb of Bexley North. It is served by Sydney Trains T8 Airport & South Line services.

== History ==
Bexley North station opened on 21 September 1931 when the East Hills line opened from Tempe to East Hills. In 2000, as part of the quadruplication of the line between Wolli Creek and Kingsgrove, through lines were added on either side of the existing pair.

The station was upgraded with new lifts and new bathrooms; this was completed in October 2021.

== Services ==
=== Platforms ===
Platform	Line	Stopping pattern	Notes
1	T8	services to Central & the City Circle via the Airport	
2	T8	services to Revesby early morning & late night services to Macarthur	

=== Transport links ===
Transit Systems operates five bus routes via Bexley North station:

Kingsgrove Ave:

- 410: Marsfield to Hurstville via Ryde, Concord, Burwood and Campsie
- 420: Westfield Burwood to Westfield Eastgardens via Campsie, Rockdale and Sydney Airport
- 420N: Westfield Burwood to Westfield Eastgardens Night service
- 491: Five Dock to Hurstville via Ashfield, Canterbury and Earlwood
- 493: HomeCo. Roselands to Rockdale via Beverly Hills, Bexley North and Bexley

U-Go Mobility operates one bus route via Bexley North station:

- 446: RHomeCo. Roselands to St George Hospital, Kogarah via Earlwood and Bardwell Park

Bexley North station is served by one NightRide route:

- N20: Riverwood station to Town Hall via Narwee, Rockdale and Airport
