= Anthony Totten =

Australian rugby league footballer

Personal information
- Born: 11 February 1969 (age 57) Canterbury, New South Wales, Australia

Playing information
- Position: Wing
Club
Years	Team	Pld	T	G	FG	P
1989–91	Eastern Suburbs	12	6	14	0	52

Anthony Totten (born 11 February 1969) is an Australian former professional rugby league footballer who played in the 1980s and 1990s.

He was born in Canterbury, New South Wales. A St. George junior from Bexley North, New South Wales, Anthony Totten appeared with the Sydney Roosters for two seasons between 1989 and 1991. He played 12 first grade games with the club, scored 6 tries and kicked 14 goals, scoring a total of 52 points for the club. He is listed as the Sydney Roosters 858th player.
