= Bardwell Valley =

- Suburb
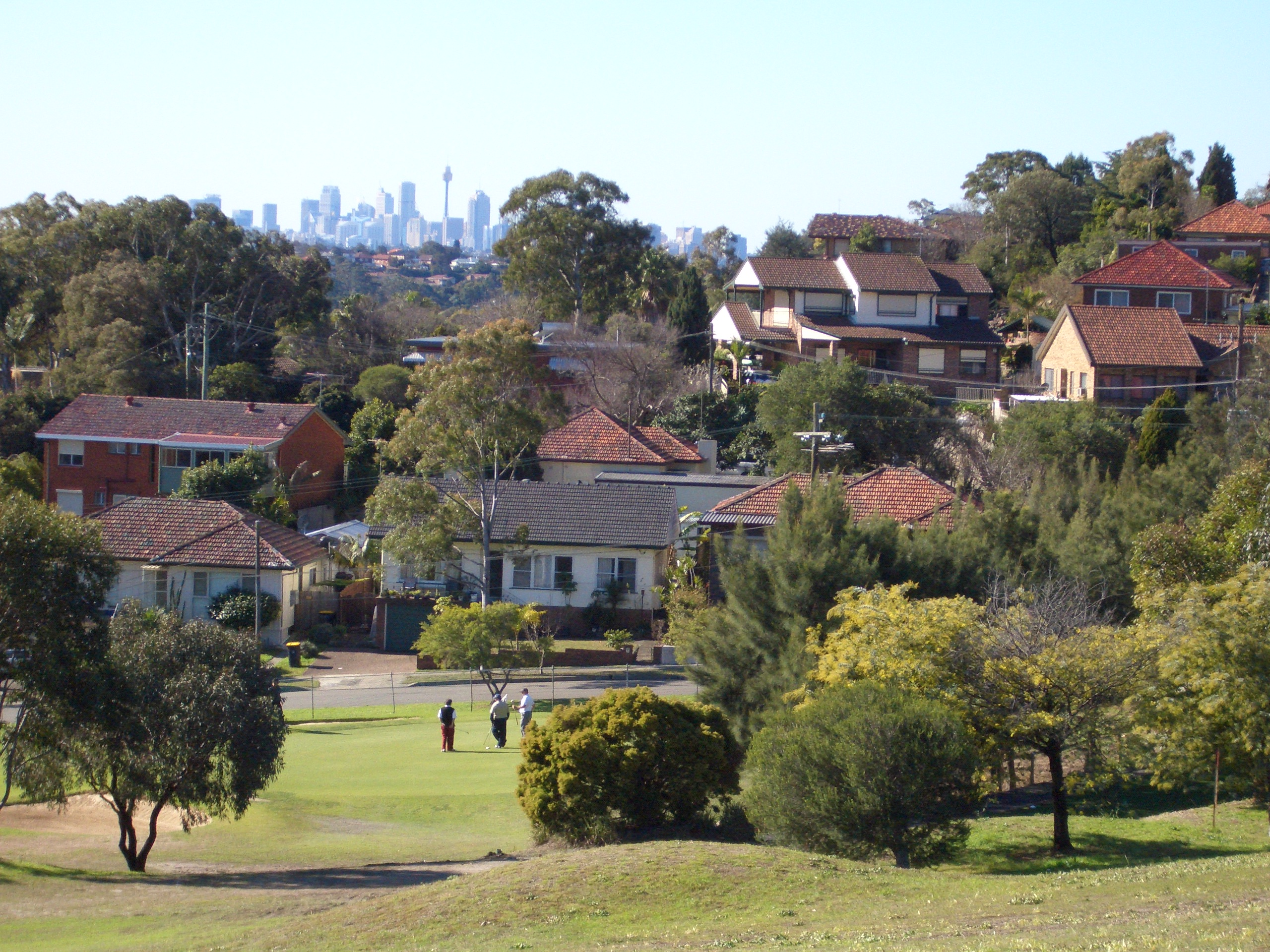
- Bardwell Valley, view of city

- Interactive map of Bardwell Valley
- Country: Australia
- State: New South Wales
- City: Sydney
- LGA: Bayside Council
- Location: 12 km (7.5 mi) south-west of Sydney CBD
- Established: 1996

Government
  - State electorate: Rockdale
  - Federal division: Barton
- Elevation: 25 m (82 ft)

Population
  - Total: 2,344 (2021 census)
- Postcode: 2207
Suburbs around Bardwell Valley
Bardwell Park	Earlwood	Earlwood
Bexley	Bardwell Valley	Turrella
Rockdale	Banksia	Arncliffe

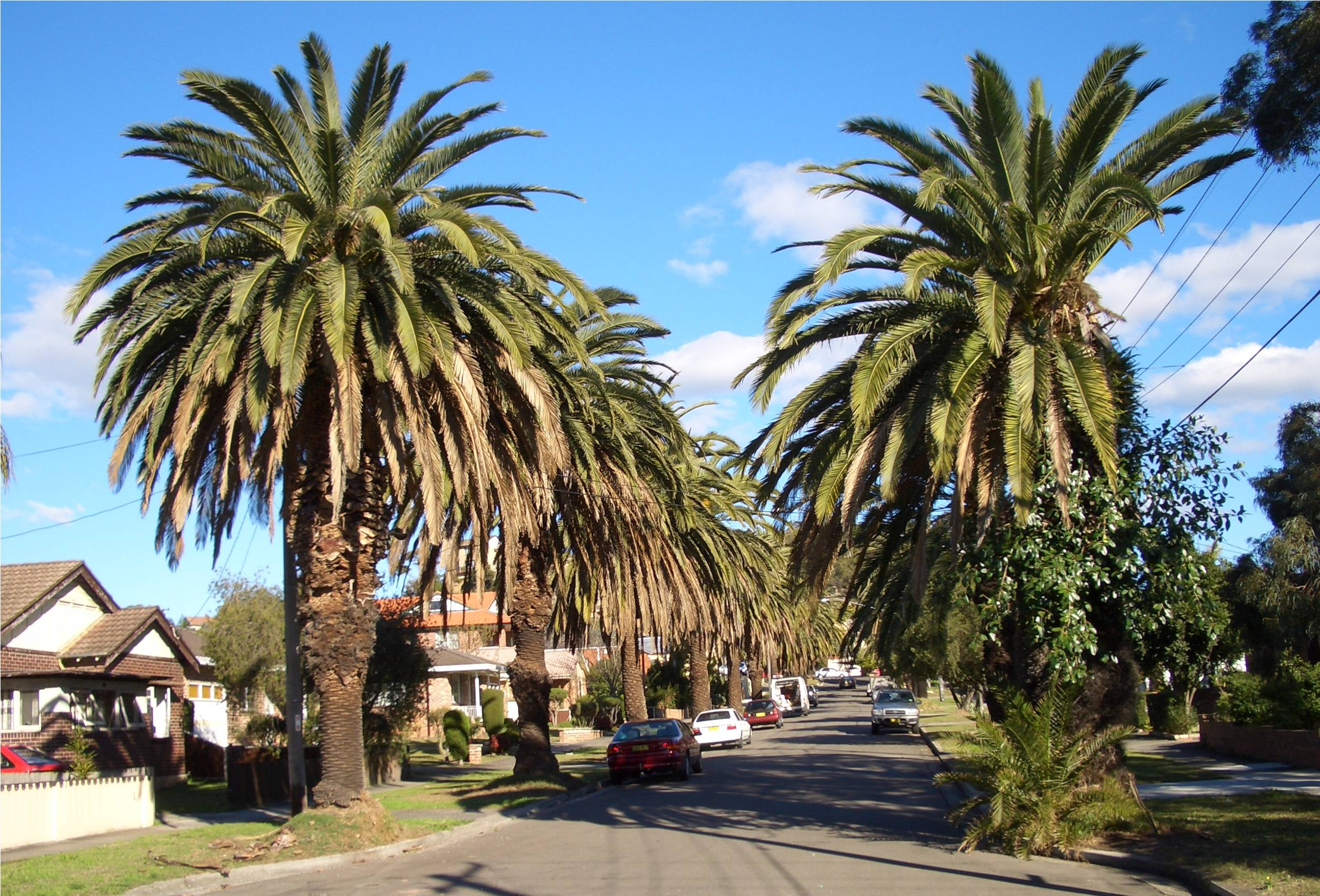
Mawson Street

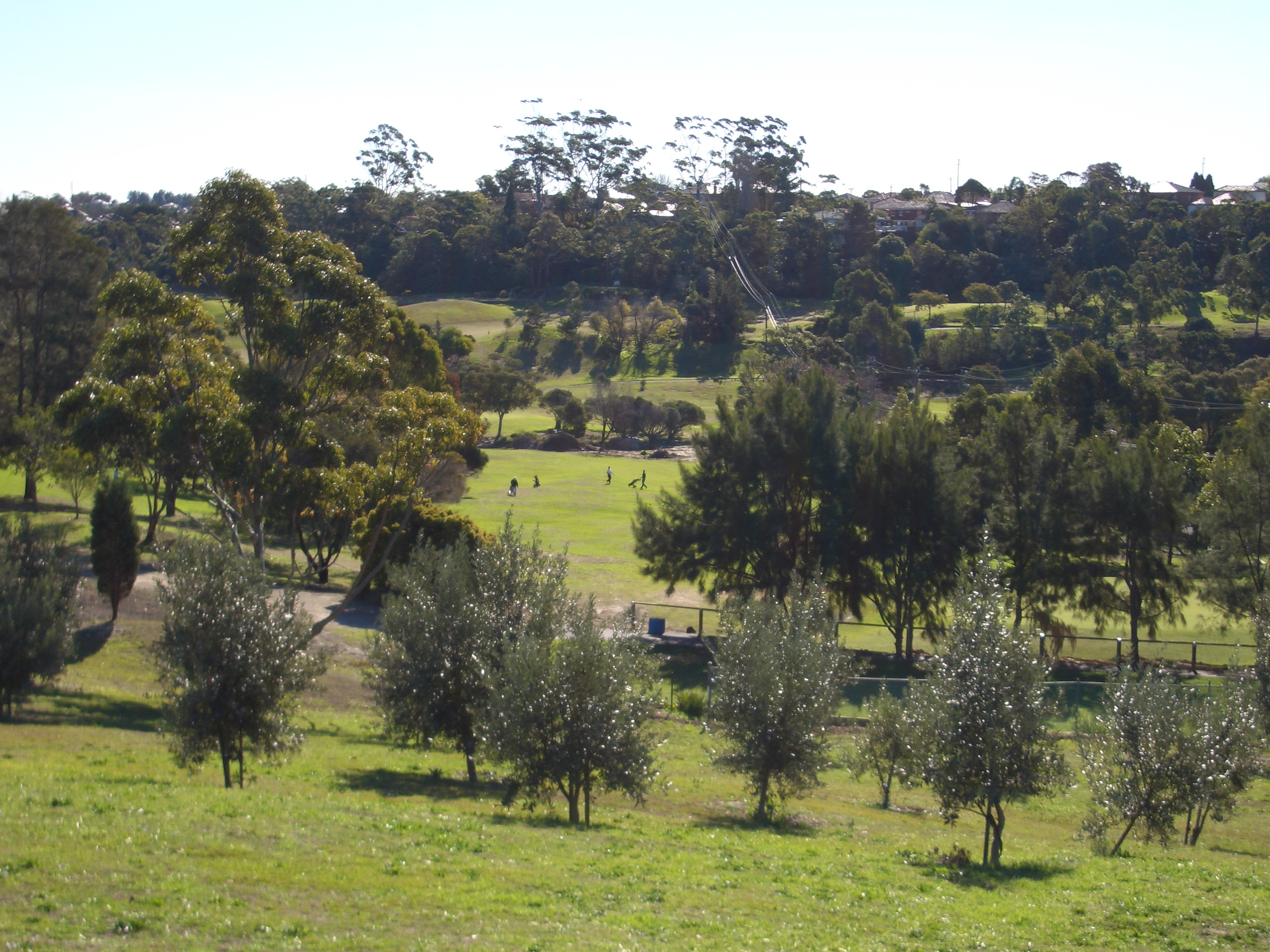
Bardwell Valley Golf Course

Bardwell Valley is a suburb in southern Sydney, in the state of New South Wales, Australia. Bardwell Valley is located approximately 11 kilometres south-west of the Sydney central business district, in the local government area of the Bayside Council and is part of the St George area.

Bardwell Valley is a primarily residential area. Some sandstone cottages from the early 20th century still stand in East Street and The Glen Road. Bardwell Creek runs through the middle of the valley and empties into Wolli Creek.

== History ==
Prior to European settlement, Bardwell Valley was a significant part of the lands of the Cadigal people. Bardwell Valley was originally the name used to describe the land beside Bardwell Creek in the suburb of Bardwell Park. The suburb was formed in 1996 from parts of Arncliffe that bordered the valley and creek.

Bardwell Park was named after free settler Thomas Hill Bardwell who owned land in this area. Thomas Hill Bardwell was a wealthy pastoralist from southern New South Wales who bought the land in December 1853.

In 2002, the City of Rockdale established an olive grove in Silver Jubilee Park, commemorating the contribution of the Australian Greek community in the development of the City of Rockdale.

== Demographics ==
According to the 2021 census of population, there were 2,344 residents in Bardwell Valley. 62.9% of people were born in Australia. The next most common country of birth was Lebanon at 5.7%. 52.6% of people only spoke English at home. Other languages spoken at home included Arabic 15.4% and Greek 6.7%. The most common responses for religious affiliation were No Religion 23.0%, Catholic 20.9%, Islam 18.7% and Eastern Orthodox 15.5%.

== Parks and recreation ==
Bardwell Valley Golf Course sits beside the banks of Bardwell Creek. The Bardwell Valley Golf Club is located in Hillcrest Avenue. Silver Jubilee Park is located beside the golf course on Lorraine Avenue. Coolibah Reserve, Shepherd Reserve and Favell Picnic Area sit beside Bardwell Creek.

== Gallery ==
=== Houses ===
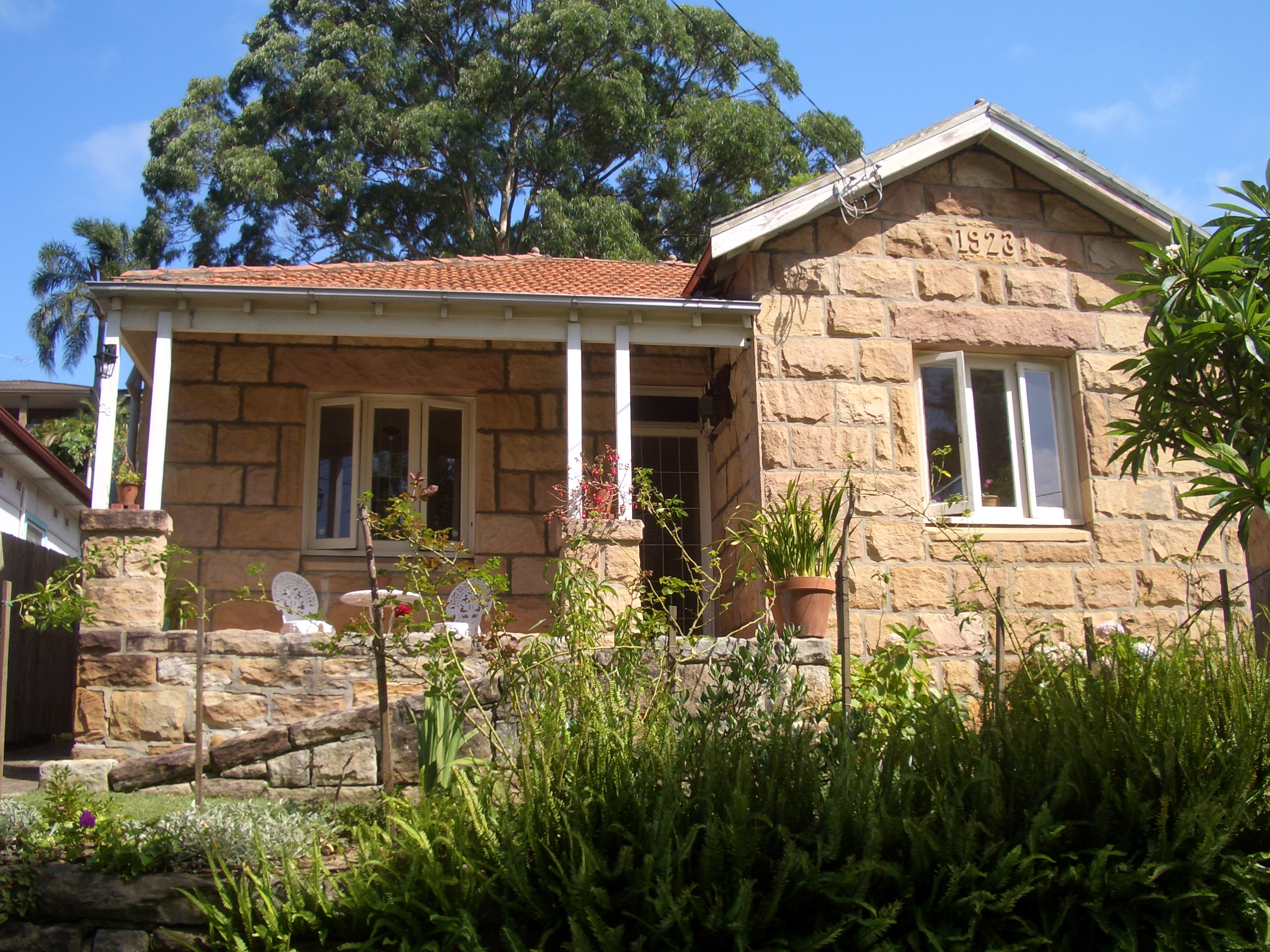
Sandstone Cottage, Glen Road

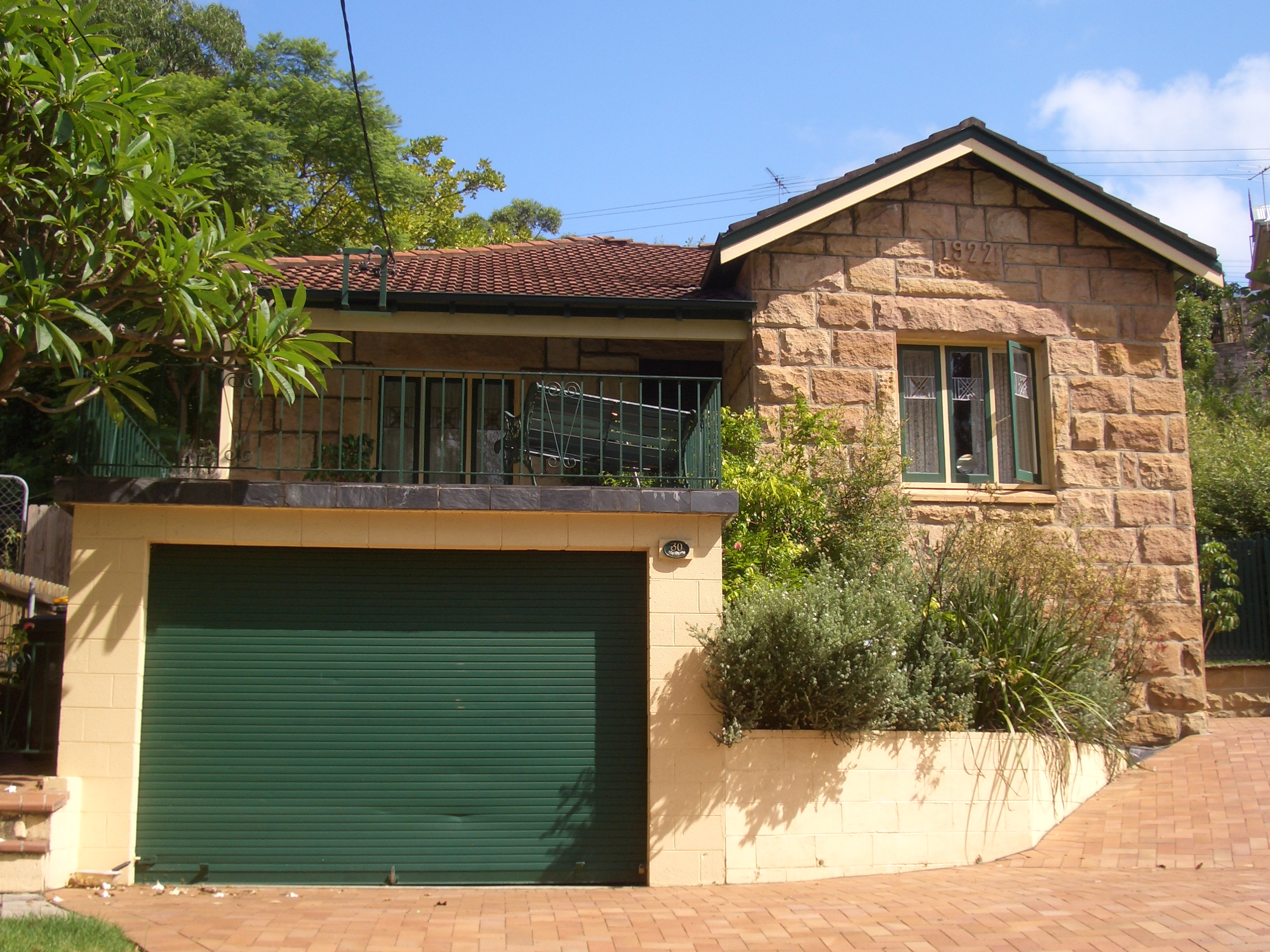
Sandstone Cottage, Glen Road

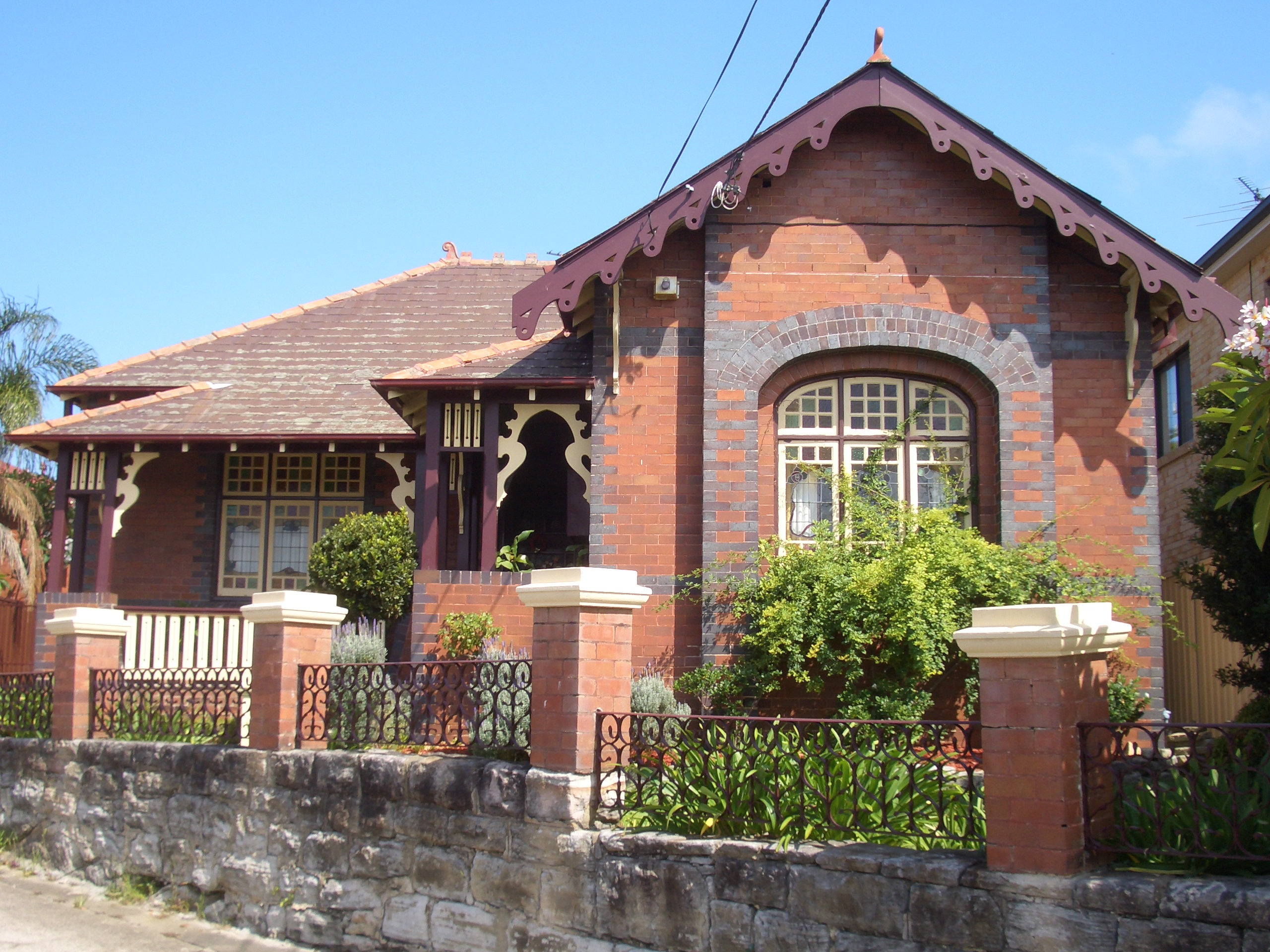
Federation cottage with Art Nouveau influence, East street

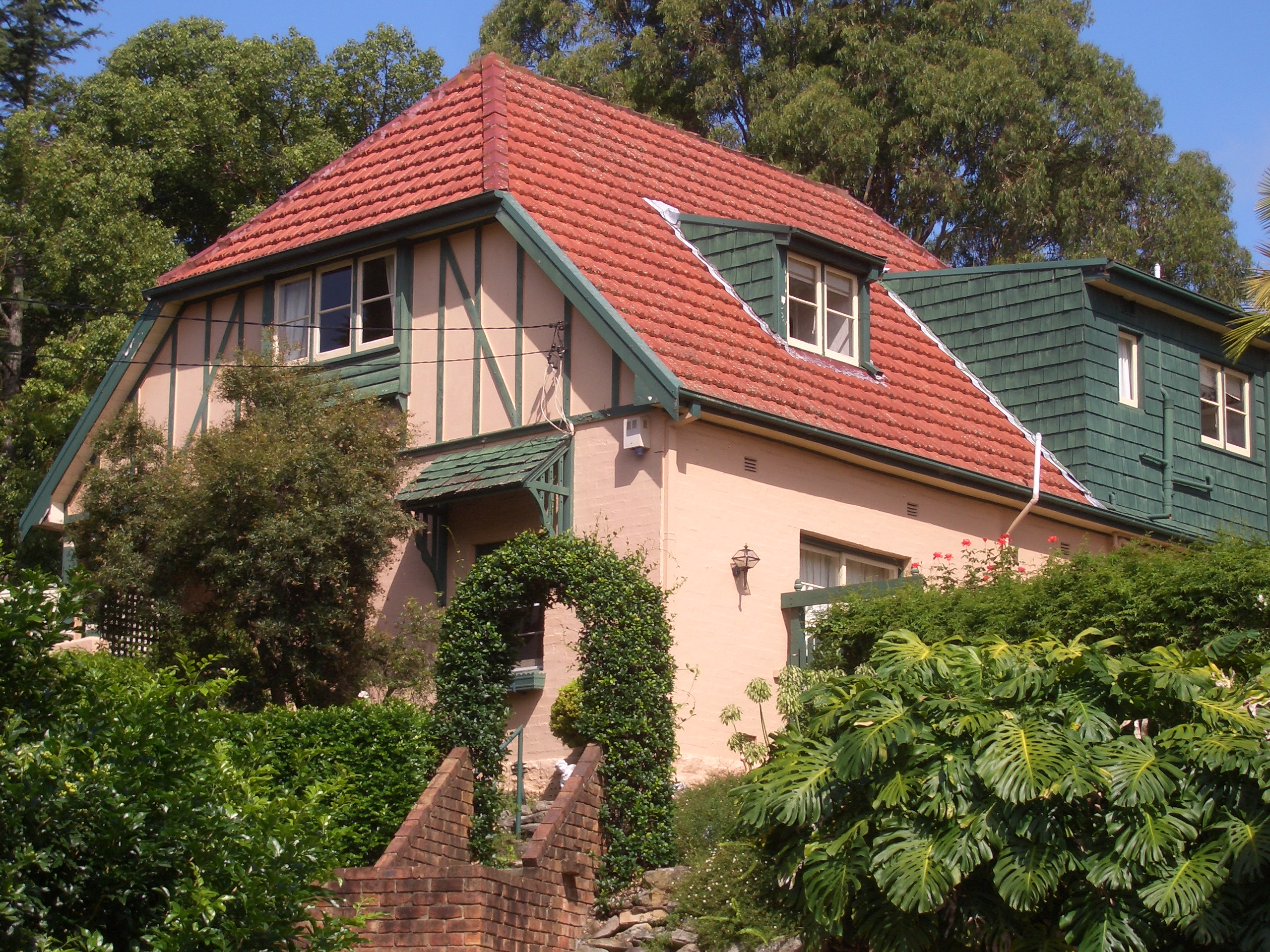
Home with Arts and Crafts influence, Glen Road
