= Bardwell Park =

- Suburb
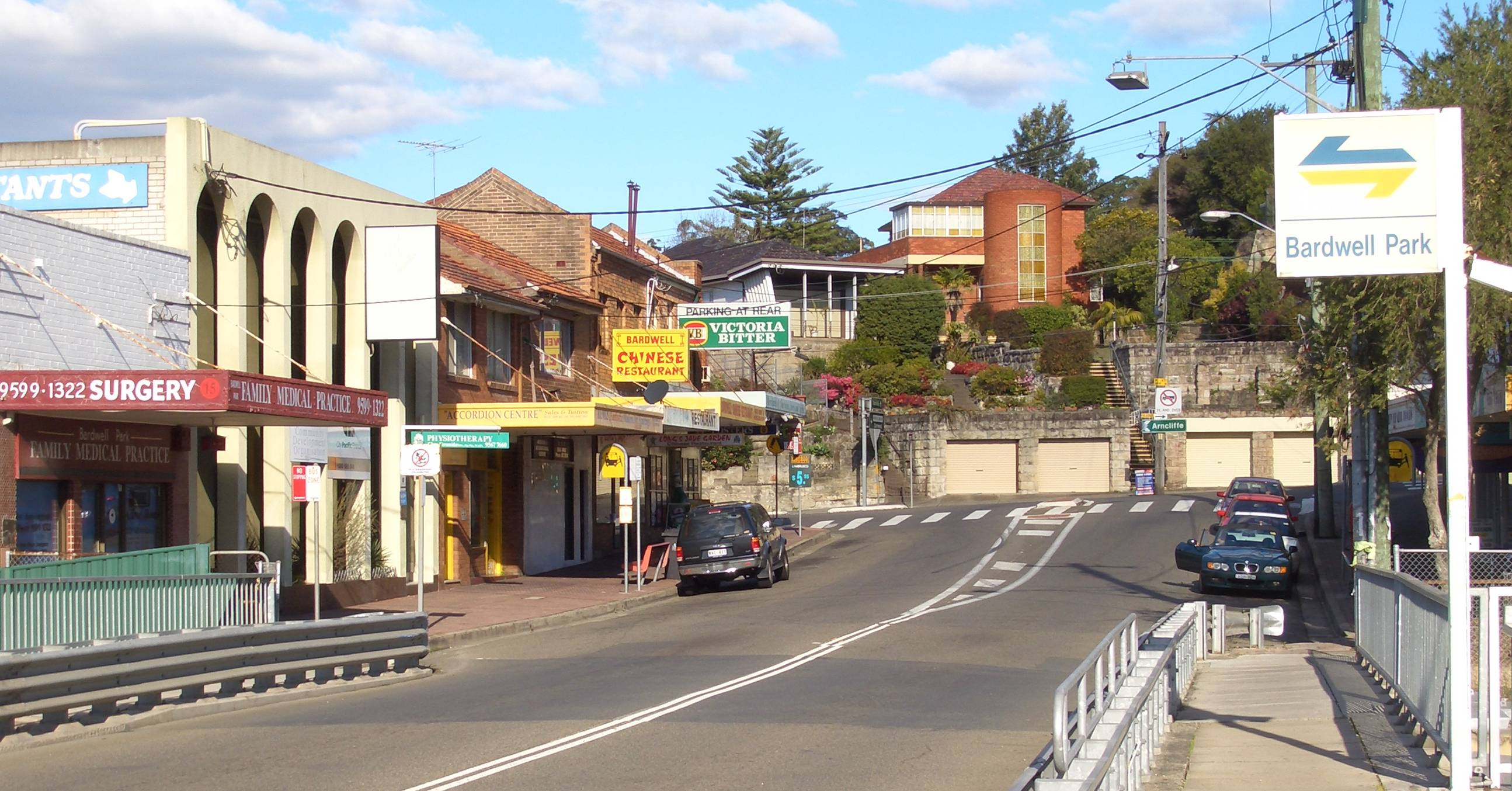
- Hartill-Law Avenue (eastern side shops) in 2006.

- Interactive map of Bardwell Park
- Country: Australia
- State: New South Wales
- City: Sydney
- LGA: Bayside Council
- Location: 12 km (7.5 mi) south-west of Sydney CBD

Government
  - State electorate: Rockdale
  - Federal division: Barton
- Elevation: 19 m (62 ft)

Population
  - Total: 2,320 (2021 census)
- Postcode: 2207
Suburbs around Bardwell Park
| Earlwood | Earlwood | Earlwood |
| Bexley North | Bardwell Park | Turrella |
| Bexley North | Bardwell Valley | Bardwell Valley |

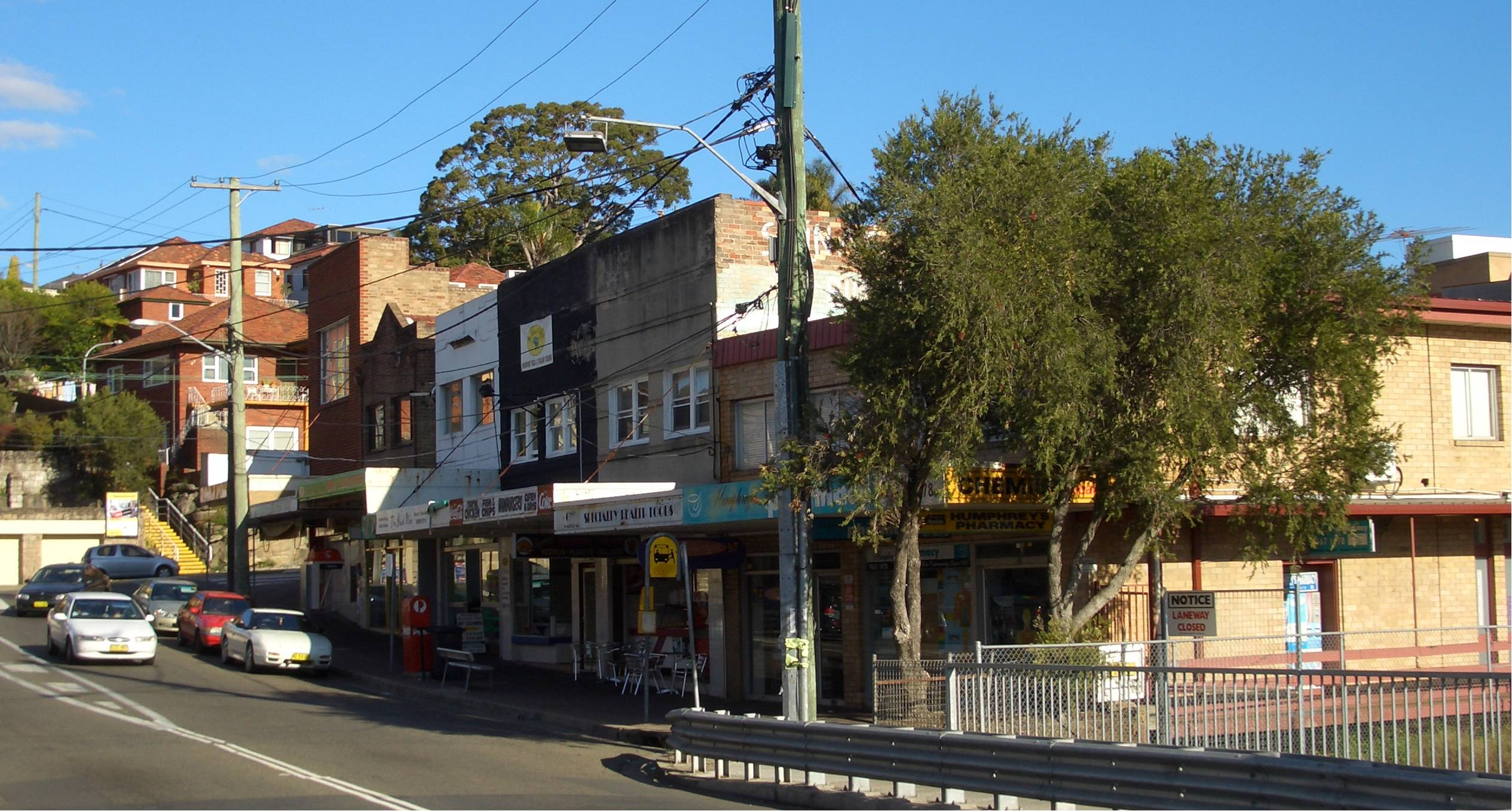
Hartill-Law Avenue (western side shops)

Bardwell Park is a suburb in southern Sydney, in the state of New South Wales, Australia. The suburb is located 12 kilometres south-west of the Sydney central business district and is part of the St George area. Bardwell Park is in the local government area of the Bayside Council. Bardwell Valley is a separate suburb, to the east.

== History ==
Bardwell Park was named after free settler Thomas Hill Bardwell who owned land in the area. His grant was originally heavily timbered and bounded by Wolli Creek, Dowling Street and Wollongong Road. In 1881, the land was auctioned and 1,600 acres (6.5 km^{2}) were subdivided. The railway station opened on 21 September 1931 which opened up the area for home sites. The school opened in September 1943 and the post office opened in May 1946. Up until 2016 it was the only suburb in Sydney not to have traffic lights. However, due to many road incidents at the Slade Road and Hartill-Law Avenue intersection, which also proved to be a risk to pedestrians, and to community action which was also faced with ongoing delays from the then Rockdale Council, traffic lights were eventually installed and turned on on 11 August 2016.

== Bardwell Park and Wolli Creek Valley ==
Bardwell Park borders an important piece of remnant bushland, the Wolli Creek Valley, beside Wolli Creek. There have been active citizens' movements lobbying for its preservation in the face of demands for urban expansion. The most public of these prevented the building of the M5 South Western Motorway through the valley, resulting in the road being built as a tunnel under the valley. Nevertheless, community concern remains over what is seen as the release of particle pollution from exhaust emissions into the atmosphere in the Bardwell Valley.

The Wolli Creek Valley contains the only bushland of any size left in inner south-west Sydney. It is also the only large undeveloped natural space that remains in a heavily developed residential and industrial region. The park offers public transport access, family picnic areas, parkland, birdwatching, bushwalking, extensive views of sandstone escarpments, heathland and woodland forest. A 60 hectare regional park is under development.

Other surrounding recreational areas include Coolibah Reserve, Shepard Reserve, Lambert RD Reserve, Ron Gosling Reserve, and Silver Jubilee Park. Currently, a group of local volunteers is helping to improve the surrounding bushland density of the suburb, and have been doing so since 2013.

== Commercial area ==
Bardwell Park is a leafy, predominantly residential area but features a small shopping centre around Hartill-Law Avenue and Slade Road, beside the Bardwell Park railway station. The Bardwell Park - Earlwood RSL is also located beside the railway station and includes a new gym and the club has undergone a renovation in October 2011.

== Transport ==
Bardwell Park railway station is on the T8 Airport & South Line of the Sydney Trains network. Bardwell Park is also serviced by 2 bus services, including Transit Systems route 473 from Campsie to Rockdale and route 491 from Five Dock to Hurstville.

== Demographics ==
According to the 2021 census of Population, there were 2,320 residents in Bardwell Park; 65.3% of whom were born in Australia. The most common other countries of birth were China 6.5% and Greece 5.1%. The most common reported ancestries in Bardwell Park were Greek 22.7%, English 17.3%, Australian 15.9%, Chinese 13.8% and Italian 6.4%. 52.6% of people only spoke English at home. Other languages spoken at home included Greek 16.6% and Mandarin 5.9%. The most common responses for religious affiliation were No Religion 27.8%, Eastern Orthodox 23.9%, Catholic 21.6%, and Anglican 5.5%.
