= Turrella railway station =

Railway station in Sydney, New South Wales, Australia

Turrella
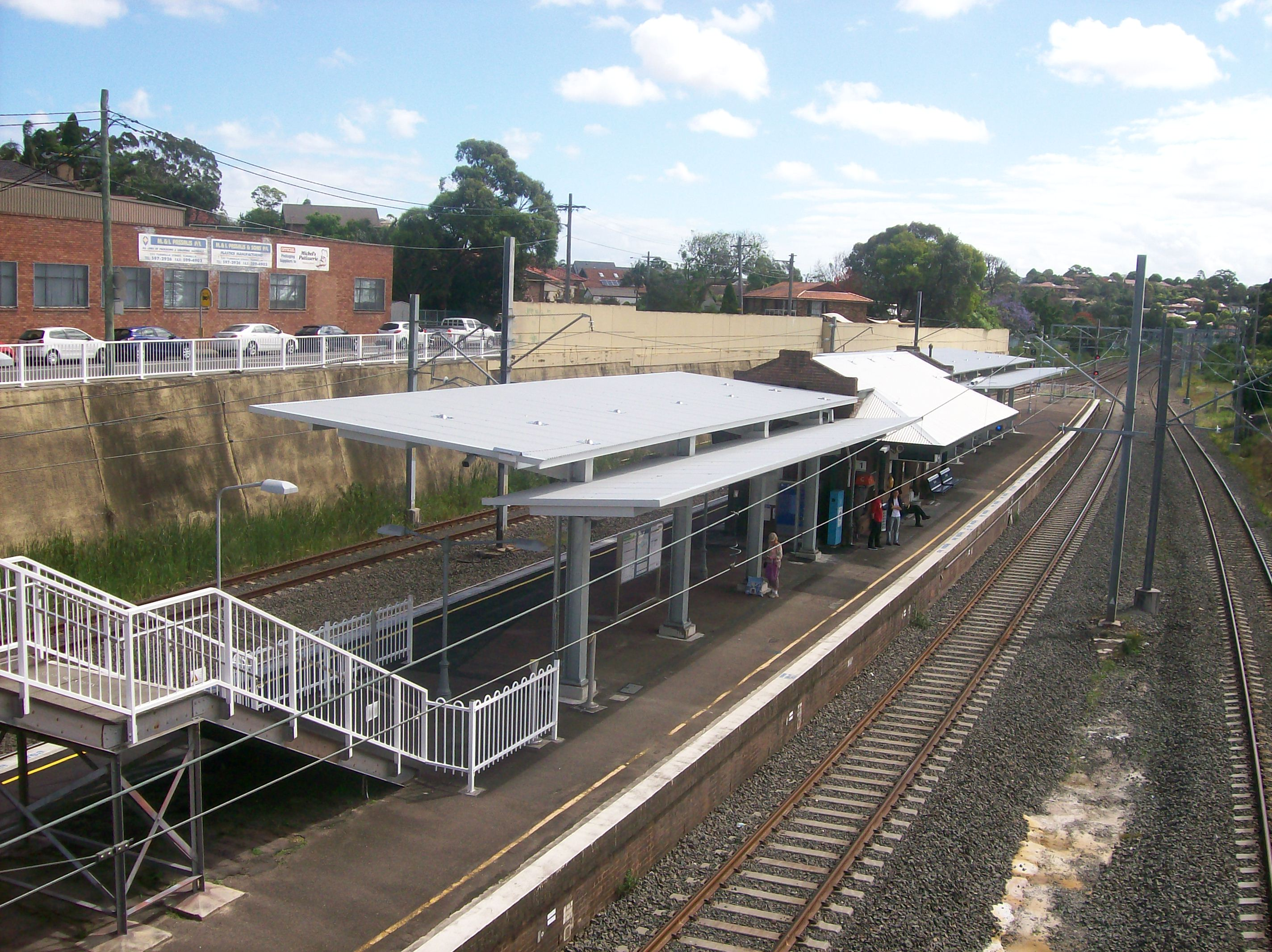
- Westbound view of platform with station building and shelter in December 2011

General information
- Location: Turrella Street, Turrella; Sydney, New South Wales; Australia
- Coordinates: 33°55′48″S 151°08′24″E
- Owner: Transport Asset Manager of NSW
- Operator: Sydney Trains
- Line: East Hills
- Distance: 8.63 km (5.36 mi) from Central
- Platforms: 2 (1 island)
- Tracks: 4
- Connections: Bus

Construction
- Structure type: Ground
- Accessible: Yes

Other information
- Status: Weekdays: Staffed: 6am to 2pm: Weekends and public holidays: Unstaffed
- Station code: TLL
- Website: Transport for NSW

History
- Opened: 21 September 1931 (95 years ago)
- Electrified: Yes (from opening)

Passengers
- 2025: 536,802 (year); 1,471 (daily) (Sydney Trains)
- Rank: 157

Services
| Preceding station | Sydney Trains | Following station |
|---|---|---|
| Bardwell Park towards Revesby or Macarthur | Airport & South Line | Wolli Creek towards City Circle |
Location

Turrella railway station is a suburban railway station located on the East Hills line, serving the Sydney suburb of Turrella. It is served by Sydney Trains T8 Airport & South Line services.

== History ==
Turrella station opened on 21 September 1931 when the East Hills line opened from Tempe to East Hills. In 2000, as part of the quadruplication of the line between Wolli Creek and Kingsgrove, through lines were added on either side of the existing pair.

In early 2024, Turrella station received an accessibility upgrade, which included a new concourse, lift and stairs, as well as other minor upgrades making the station fully accessible.

== Services ==
=== Platforms ===
| Platform | Line | Stopping pattern | Notes |
| 1 | Airport & South Line | services to Central & the City Circle via the Airport | |
| 2 | Airport & South Line | services to Revesby early morning & late night services to Macarthur | one weekday evening service terminates & returns to the City Circle |

=== Transport links ===
Transit Systems operates one bus route via Turrella station, under contract to Transport for NSW:

Turrella St:

- 473: Campsie to Rockdale station via Clemton Park, Earlwood, Bardwell Park and Arncliffe
