= William Bardwell =

William Bardwell may refer to:

- William Bardwell (The Young and the Restless), fictional character
- William Bardwell (MP) (c. 1361–1434), English MP
