= Wolli Creek =

Coordinates: 33°56′00″S 151°07′30″E

Wolli Creek Wolli Creek Canal
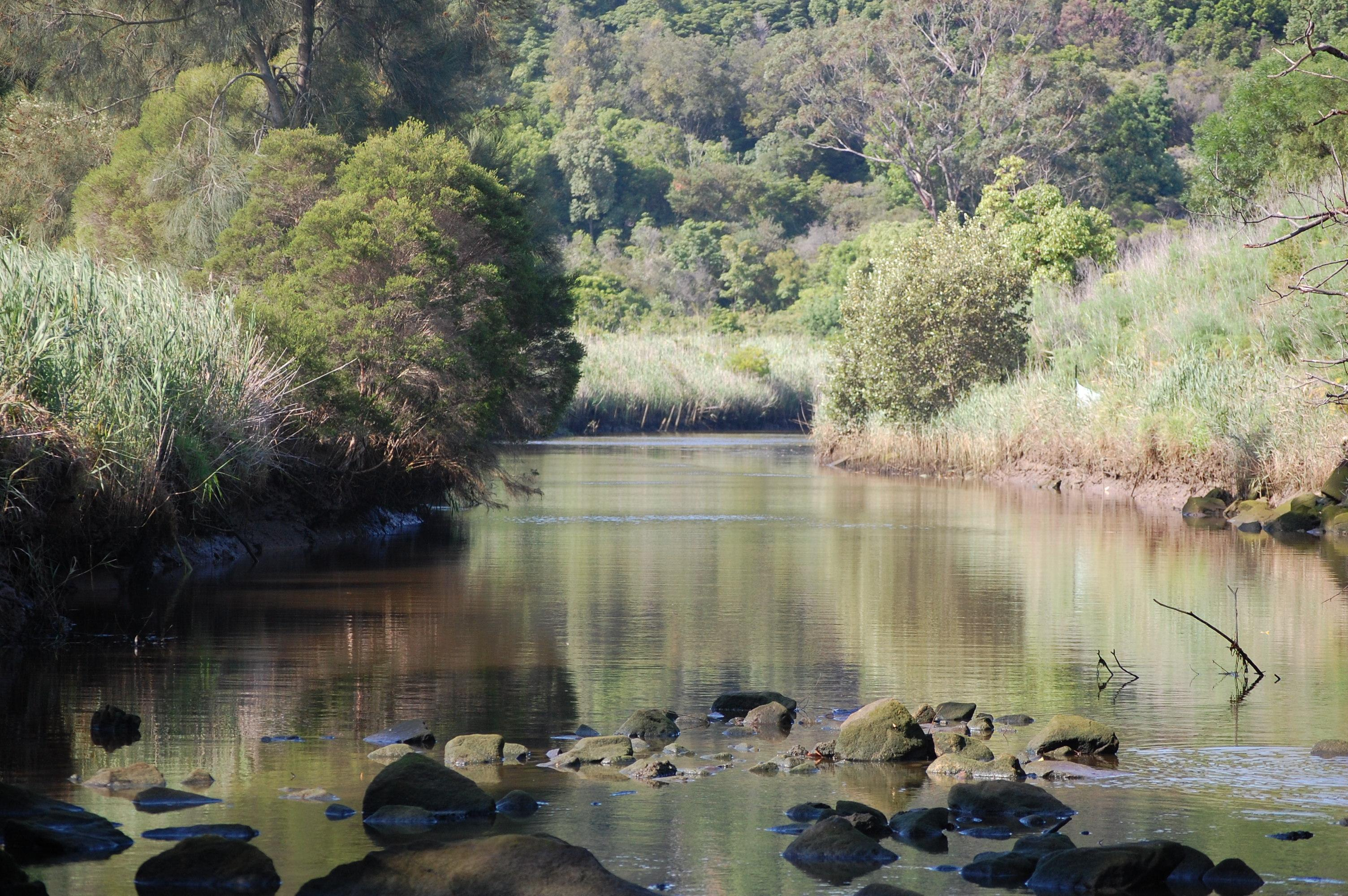
- Wolli Creek, view from the weir at Turrella.
- Etymology: Aboriginal: "Black's camp"

Location
- Country: Australia
- State: New South Wales
- IBRA: Sydney Basin, St George
- District: Southern Sydney
- Municipalities: Georges River Council, Bayside Council, City of Canterbury-Bankstown

Physical characteristics
- Source: Beverly Hills Park
  - location: south of Narwee
- Mouth: confluence with the Cooks River
  - location: between Arncliffe and Tempe
- Length: 9 km (5.6 mi)
- Basin size: 22 km^{2} (8.5 sq mi)

Basin features
- River system: Cooks River catchment
- Tributaries
  - right: Bardwell Creek
- Nature Reserve: Wolli Creek Regional Park

Wolli Creek (/ˈwɒlaɪ/) is an urban watercourse of the Cooks River catchment located in the southern suburbs of Sydney, in New South Wales, Australia.

== Course and features ==
Wolli Creek rises south of Narwee, within Beverly Hills Park, Beverly Hills. The creek flows generally east northeast through Wolli Creek Valley and Wolli Creek Regional Park, joined by its major tributary, Bardwell Creek, before reaching its confluence with the Cooks River near Arncliffe and Tempe. The creek is a lined channel between Kingsgrove Road, Kingsgrove and Bexley Road, Bexley North where it then enters the Wolli Creek Valley. The sub-catchment area of the creek is 22 square kilometres (8.5 sq mi).

=== Nature conservation value ===
Adjacent to Wolli Creek, within the Wolli Creek Valley, is Wolli Creek Regional Park, a planned 50 hectares (120 acres) nature reserve of native bushland and public reserves that was announced by the NSW Government in 1998 as a result of sustained community campaigning for the area to be preserved and for the M5 East Freeway to go underground. Whilst some of the park has been formed and management handed over from local government authorities to the NSW National Parks & Wildlife Service, including the 8.9 hectares (22 acres) Girrahween Park and some privately held land that was compulsorily acquired, some areas of the originally planned park remain in the hands of government agencies including Sydney Water and Roads & Maritime Services.

When complete, the planned nature reserve offers easy public transport access, family picnic areas, extensive views and bushland, rugged sandstone escarpments with walking tracks, a mixture of parkland, heathland, and woodland forest, and great birdwatching in close proximity to heavily developed residential and industrial landscape.

==== Wildlife ====
===== Bird observation =====
The diversity of habitat and strategic location of the Wolli Creek Valley are reflected in the wide range of bird species to be found adjacent to the creek. Approximately 175 species of birds have been recorded in the area between 1940 and 1999.

===== Fish =====
Several species of freshwater and saltwater fish can be found in the Wolli Creek in areas above and below the fish ladder. The fish ladder, or "rock-ramp fishway" was constructed to enable fish to bypass the weir at Henderson St, Turrella, allowing migration to other areas of the creek.

==== Coastal saltmarsh ====
The lower reaches – the tidal part – of Wolli Creek are home to a plant community known as saltmarsh, or coastal saltmarsh. The plant community includes various salinity-tolerant species such as Knobby Club-rush (Ficinia nodosa), Samphire (Sarcocornia quinqueflora), Sea Rush (Juncus kraussii), Seablite (Suaeda australis), Streaked Arrowgrass (Triglochin striata) and others. Coastal saltmarsh has been recognised as a carbon sink as well as a filter of nutrients maintaining water quality and is listed as an Endangered Ecological Community under the Threatened Species Conservation Act 1995.

== Gallery ==
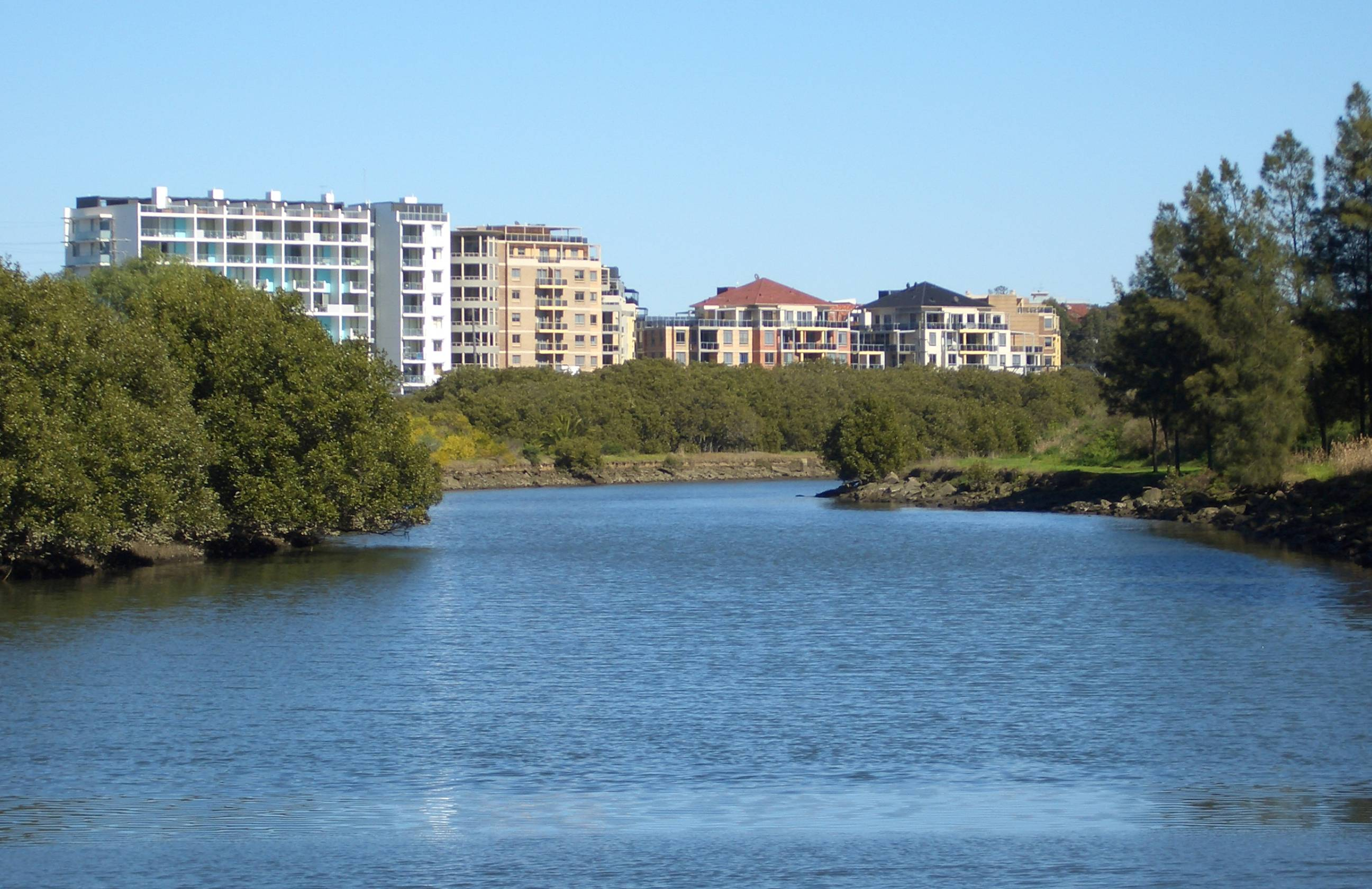
Confluence of Wolli Creek and the Cooks River, near Tempe.

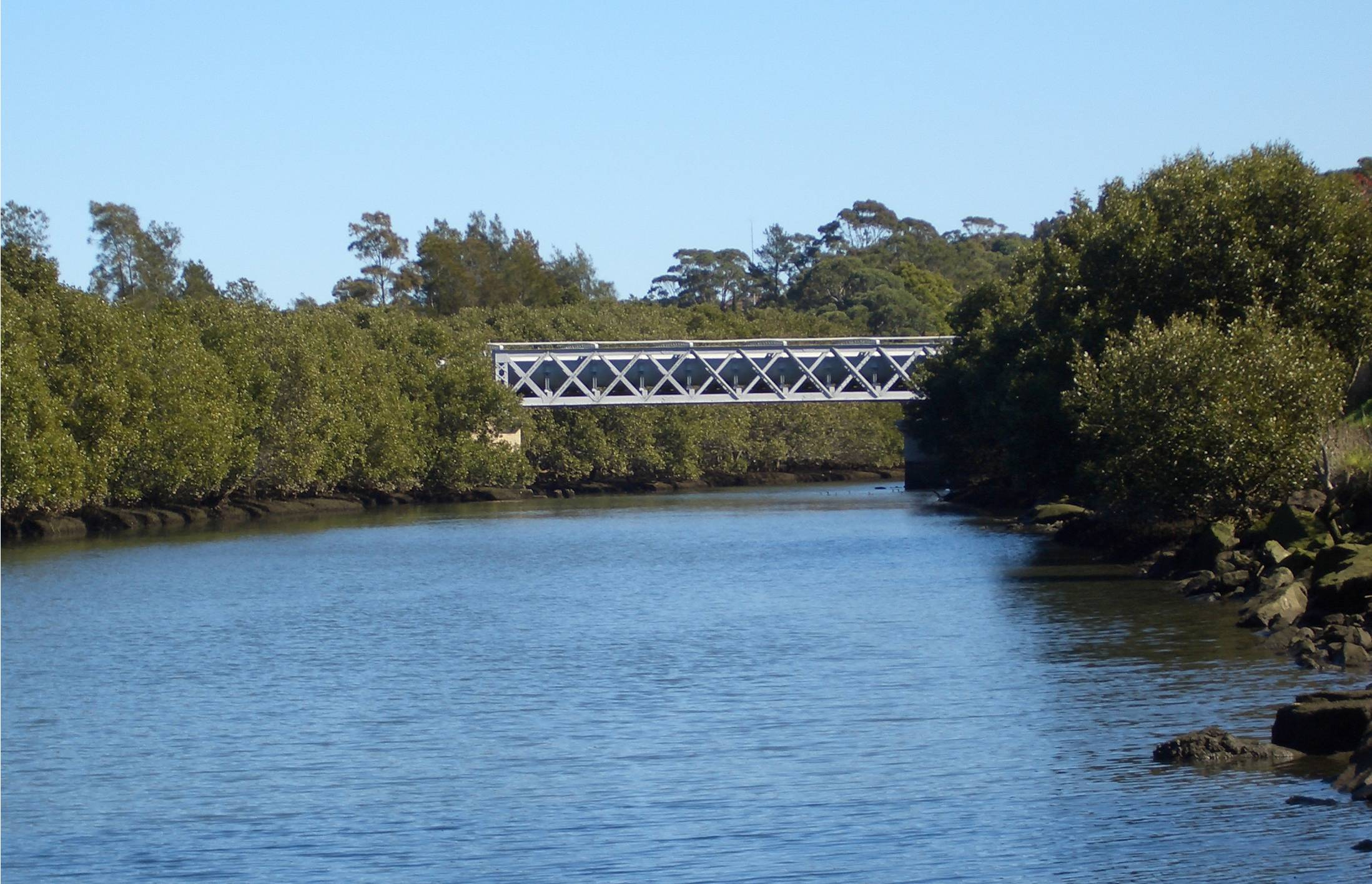
Wolli Creek, looking toward the South Western Ocean Outfall Sewer (SWOOS).

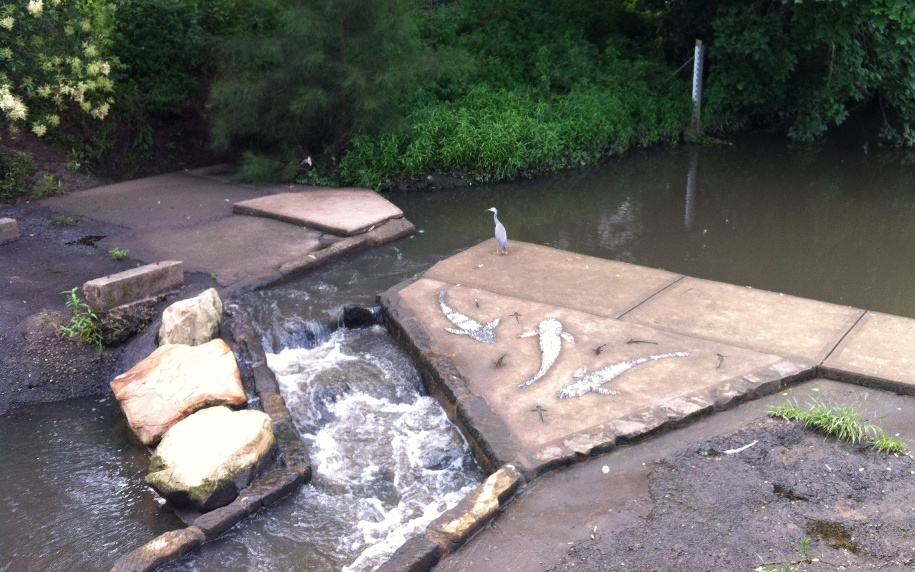
Wolli Creek Fish Ladder, Turrella.

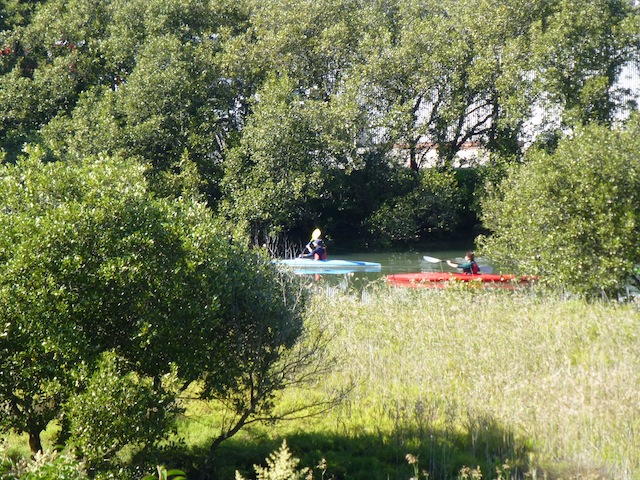
Wolli Creek saltmarsh and mangroves below Jackson Place, Earlwood NSW.

== See also ==
- Wolli Creek Regional Park
