= Robert Bardwell =

American musician

Robert Bardwell in the scoreboard room at Jacobs Field.

Robert Bardwell, also known as "The Phantom of Jacobs Field," is the former organist for the Cleveland Indians.

Bardwell was hired in 2001 as the Indians' music director, a position that also required him to serve as the organist, playing familiar songs such as Take Me Out to the Ball Game, the Tarantella, the Star-Spangled Banner, O Canada and the Charge fanfare, as well as God Bless America, which Major League Baseball required teams to play following the 9/11 attacks. Because the stadium did not use a traditional organ, Bardwell played an Ensoniq keyboard with a classic ballpark organ sample stored on a floppy disk. During pitching changes and delays, he played other music to pump up the fans, and he was also tasked with playing favorite songs selected by players who were up to bat.

Bardwell became something of a local celebrity in 2002, when The Plain Dealer ran a feature piece dubbing him "The Phantom of Jacobs Field." He left the Indians in 2006.
