= Bardwell Park railway station =

Railway station in Sydney, New South Wales, Australia

Bardwell Park
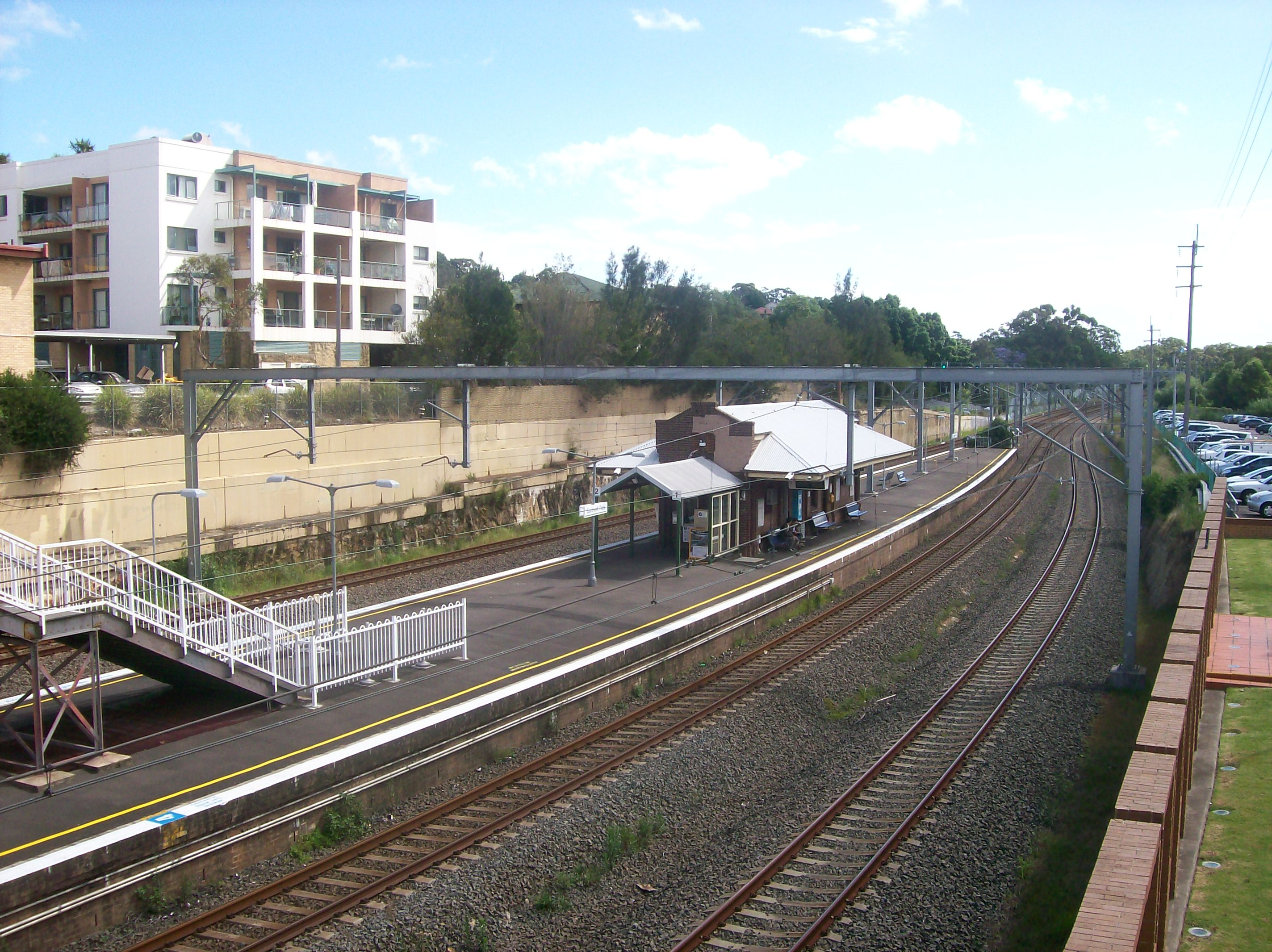
- Westbound view of platform and building in December 2011

General information
- Location: Hartill-Law Avenue, Bardwell Park; Sydney, New South Wales; Australia
- Coordinates: 33°55′54″S 151°07′29″E
- Owner: Transport Asset Manager of NSW
- Operator: Sydney Trains
- Line: East Hills
- Distance: 10.10 km (6.28 mi) from Central
- Platforms: 2 (1 island)
- Tracks: 4
- Connections: Bus

Construction
- Structure type: Ground
- Accessible: Yes

Other information
- Status: Weekdays: Staffed: 6am to 7pm: Weekends and public holidays: Unstaffed
- Station code: BPK
- Website: Transport for NSW

History
- Opened: 21 September 1931 (95 years ago)
- Electrified: Yes (from opening)

Passengers
- 2025: 526,012 (year); 1,441 (daily) (Sydney Trains)
- Rank: 158

Services
Preceding station	Sydney Trains	Following station
Bexley North towards Revesby or Macarthur	Airport & South Line via Airport	Turrella towards City Circle
Location

Bardwell Park railway station is a suburban railway station located on the East Hills line, serving the Sydney suburb of Bardwell Park. It is served by Sydney Trains T8 Airport & South Line services.

== History ==
Bardwell Park station opened on 21 September 1931 when the East Hills line opened from Tempe to East Hills. In 2000, as part of the quadruplication of the line between Wolli Creek and Kingsgrove, through lines were added on either side of the existing pair.

On 22 April 2015, the station suffered significant flooding due to inclement weather, with the flood water nearly reaching the height of the platform. A time lapse video of CCTV from the station was released publicly showing the rising flood water.

In early 2024, Minister for Transport, Jo Haylen, announced a station upgrade for Bardwell Park station, set to be completed in 2026. The upgrade will feature a new lift, stairs and concourse, as well as extended canopies and a resurfaced platform. Work is yet to begin as of late September 2024.

== Services ==
=== Platforms ===
Platform	Line	Stopping pattern	Notes
1	Airport & South Line	services to Central & the City Circle via the Airport	
2	Airport & South Line	services to Revesby early morning & late night services to Macarthur	

=== Transport links ===
Transit Systems operates two bus routes via Bardwell Park station:

Hartill-Law Ave:

- 473: Campsie to Rockdale station via Clemton Park, Earlwood, Turrella and Arncliffe
- 491: Five Dock to Hurstville via Ashfield, Canterbury and Earlwood

U-Go Mobility operates one bus route via Bardwell Park station:

- 446: HomeCo. Roselands to Kogarah via Earlwood and Bexley North
