= Tempe railway station =

Railway station in Sydney, New South Wales, Australia

Tempe
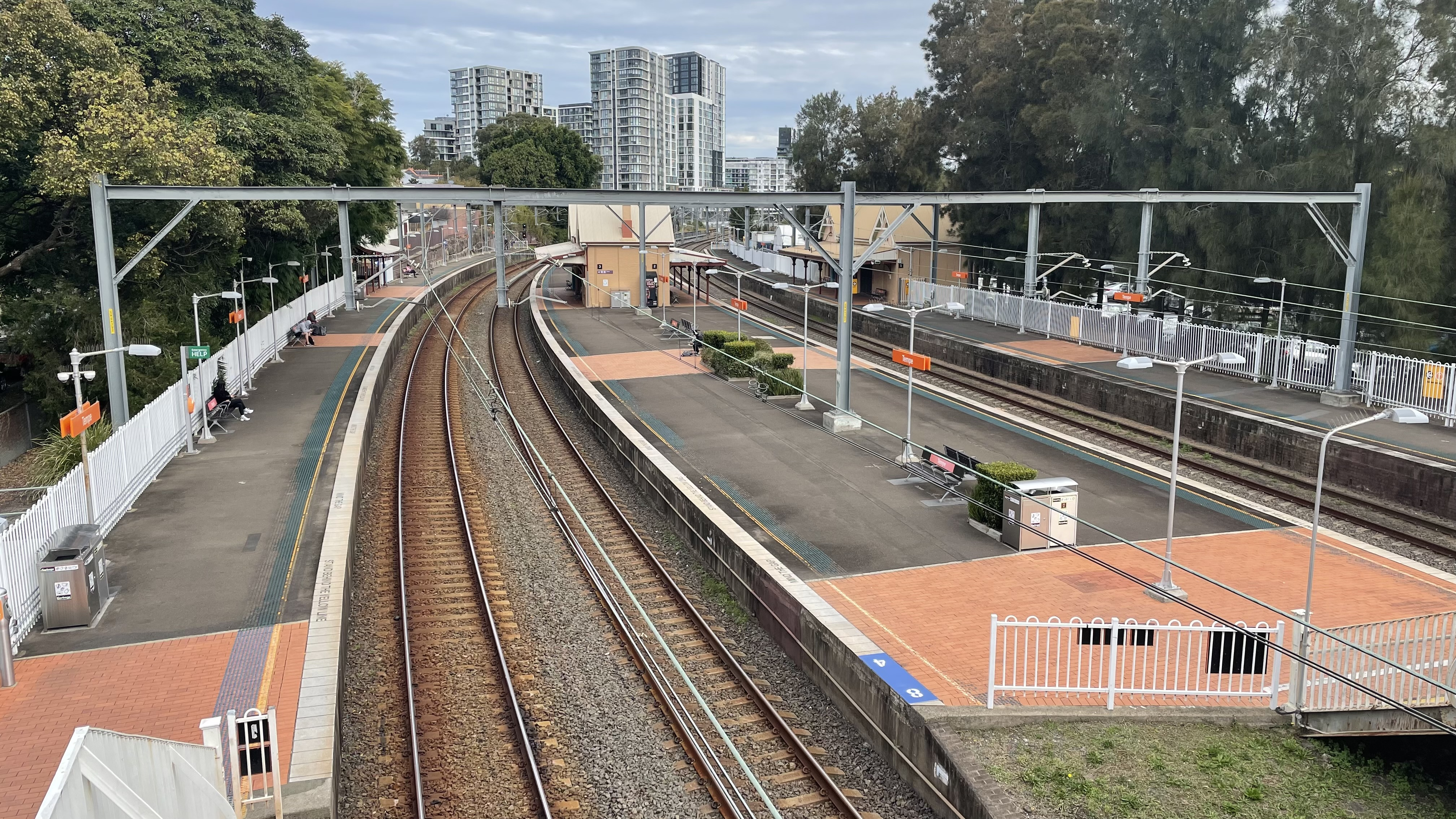
- Southbound view of the station platforms, June 2022

General information
- Location: Griffiths Street, Tempe
- Coordinates: 33°55′28″S 151°09′23″E
- Owner: Transport Asset Manager of New South Wales
- Operator: Sydney Trains
- Line: Illawarra
- Distance: 6.84 kilometres from Central
- Platforms: 4 (2 side, 1 island)
- Tracks: 4

Construction
- Structure type: Ground
- Accessible: No

Other information
- Status: Staffed
- Station code: TME
- Website: Transport for NSW

History
- Opened: 15 October 1884

Passengers
- 2025: 713,369 (year); 1,954 (daily) (Sydney Trains)
- Rank: 140

Services
Preceding station	Sydney Trains	Following station
Wolli Creek towards Waterfall or Cronulla	Eastern Suburbs & Illawarra Line	Sydenham towards Bondi Junction
Airport & South Line does not stop here
Location

Tempe railway station is a heritage-listed railway station located on the Illawarra line, serving the Sydney suburb of Tempe in New South Wales, Australia. It is served by Sydney Trains' T4 Eastern Suburbs & Illawarra Line services. It was originally built in 1884. The 1884 buildings were designed by the New South Wales Government Railways and built by C. Mayes; the 1918 footbridge was manufactured by Dorman Long. It was added to the New South Wales State Heritage Register on 2 April 1999.

== History ==
Tempe station opened on 15 October 1884 on the same date as of the Illawarra line from Redfern to Hurstville with two side platforms. It was referred to during the planning stages as Cooks River railway station, but opened under the Tempe name. It was built as a double-track station (as at Sydenham) to service what was planned to be a large residential area; however, development of the area was much slower than originally envisioned.

Unlike Sydenham, Tempe had a small goods siding immediately eastward of the station in 1890. The original buildings included brick second class platform buildings on two brick-faced platforms and a brick Station Master's residence (all of which are still extant) as well as a brick Gatekeeper's cottage (since demolished). The former Tempe Station Master's residence is to the east adjacent to Platform 4, but now in private ownership.

The steel overhead footbridge was built in 1918, with steel stairs to the platforms, just prior to the quadruplification of the line in 1919. The lines through Tempe were quadruplicated in 1919, with the western platform converted to an island platform and a new side platform built. In 1926, the line was electrified as far as Oatley. The Platform 4 building (presumably c. 1919) was demolished and replaced with a modern platform canopy at some point after 1989. c. 1993 the overhead booking office was reclad and reroofed.

Prior the opening of Wolli Creek station and the Airport line in May 2000, Tempe was the junction between the East Hills and Illawarra lines, and local East Hills services stopped at the station utilising Platforms 1 and 2. Most of the East Hills line services now run via the Airport line and those peak hour services running via Sydenham do not stop at Tempe.

To the north of the station lies the junction with the Metropolitan Goods line and the XPT Service Centre.

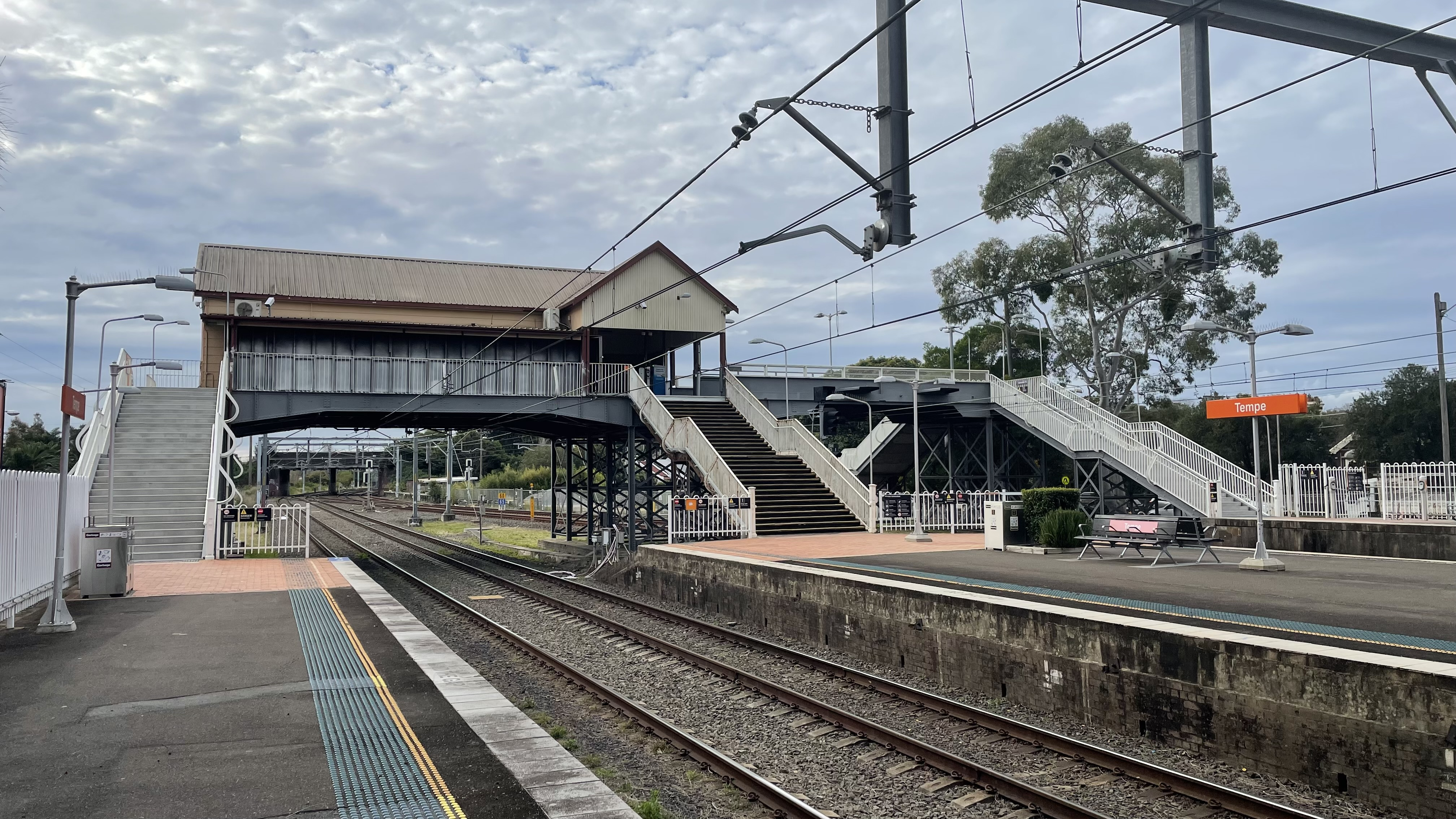
The concourse view from platform 1

== Platforms and services ==
Platform	Line	Stopping pattern	Notes
1		no booked services	Occasionally used during trackwork.
2		no booked services	Occasionally used during trackwork.
3	Eastern Suburbs & Illawarra Line	services to Bondi Junction	
4	Eastern Suburbs & Illawarra Line	services to Cronulla, Waterfall & Helensburgh	

== Description ==
Tempe Railway Station is located along Griffiths Street to the east and Richardsons Crescent and Mackey Park to the west. The station perimeter is defined with modern white powder coated aluminium fencing. The station is entered via sets of stairs at either side and a steel footbridge with stairs down to Platforms 1, 2/3 and 4.

The station complex includes the station buildings on Platform 1 and Platform 2 and 3 (both dating from 1884), the modern Platform 4 canopy, and the overhead booking office and footbridge (both dating from 1918).

The station buildings are essentially intact externally and internally with the exception of the overhead booking office, which has been reclad and re-roofed, however is the original structure.

Platform 1 Building (1884)

This is a single storey painted brick building with a hipped and gabled corrugated steel roof with gable ends facing the railway lines. There are no chimneys. The gable ends each feature arched timber louvred vents and timber barge boards. There are two large openings to a central waiting area, divided by a painted brick post, each opening featuring a timber valance. The awning has cast iron posts with cast iron decorative brackets and steel brackets mounted on decorative stucco wall brackets. Window openings are all covered over.

It was reported to be in good condition at the time of heritage listing.

Platform 2/3 Building (1884)

This is a single storey painted brick building located on the island platform with a hipped and gabled corrugated steel roof with gable ends at each end, on both sides, facing the railway lines. The Platform 2 awning is on cast iron posts with cast iron decorative brackets on timber beams, and decorative stucco wall brackets. The central waiting area faces Platform 2. There are two large openings to a central waiting area, divided by a painted brick post, each opening featuring a timber valance. There are steel security doors to the openings. The building has timber framed window openings, modern timber flush doors with covered over fanlights. There is a doorway and fanlight opening facing Platform 3. There is termite damage to the south window frame. The Platform 3 awning is cantilevered on steel brackets mounted on stucco wall brackets. The building features decorative stucco sills to windows and slightly arched window heads.

Internally, the central waiting area facing Platform 2 has a timber tongue & grooved board ceiling and an internal bricked up doorway.

It was reported to be in moderate condition at the time of heritage listing.

Platform 4 Canopy

Platform 4 has a modern platform canopy on steel posts on concrete bases with a gabled corrugated steel roof.

Overhead Booking Office (1918)

The overhead booking office located on the footbridge, formerly a weatherboard building, is now clad in hardiplank. The building has a gabled roof clad in modern cliplock roofing with 3 gable ends (east-west, and one facing the platforms to the south). There are three original timber framed double hung windows on the north elevation, and an original doorway with a fanlight covered over. There is a modern timber flush door. There are three original large timber stop-chamfered posts to the east side of the ticket office which have been cut short at the bottom, and now have concrete bases.

Footbridge, Stairs, Star Pattern Newel Posts (1918)

Steel Dorman Long & Co footbridge with two sets of taper-haunched girders, one set for street access, the other for platform interchange, steel stair balustrades and star patterned newel posts. The Dorman Long & Co steel haunched beam footbridge design consists of two sets of taper-haunched girders, with cantilevers resting on platform trestles and supporting shallow beams over the railway tracks to provide headroom over rolling stock. The central beam of the footbridge has been cut and raised to clear electric wires, when the line was electrified in 1926.

It was reported to be in good condition at the time of heritage listing.

Platforms

1 central island platform, 2 perimeter platforms. Asphalt surfaces with some modern brick paving, brick edges to Platforms 1 and 2, concrete edges to Platforms 3 and 4. Platform 1 is not in use.

Setting

Tempe Railway Station is set amongst the Cooks River to the south, Mackey Park to the west and the densely built-up residential area of Tempe to the east.

=== Modifications and dates ===
- 1926: Footbridge: The central beam of the footbridge has been cut and raised to clear electric wires when the line was electrified
- c. 1993: Overhead booking office (1918): Reclad in hardiplank, new cliplock roofing; window and door openings have modern steel security screens.
- unknown date: Platform 1 building (1884): Window openings are all covered over. Steel security doors to waiting room openings; Platform 2 and 3 building (1884): Steel security doors to waiting area openings.

== Heritage listing ==
Tempe Railway Station – inclusive of the platforms, platform buildings on Platform 1 and Platform 2/3, footbridge, stairs and booking office – is of State heritage significance as a major station on the Illawarra line developed from 1884. Tempe Railway Station is of historical significance for its two rare 1884 platform buildings dating from the first period of construction of the Illawarra railway line, along with the 1918 overhead footbridge structure and stairs, and original 1918 overhead booking office. The 1884 platform buildings have historical association with railways designer C. Mayes.

Tempe Railway Station is of aesthetic significance for its two 1884 platform buildings which are fine intact examples of vernacular railway platform buildings of the late Victorian period demonstrating Victorian Rustic Gothic style design influences, rare for their high level of integrity. The 1918 Dorman Long & Co. steel footbridge and stairs are of aesthetic significance and historical associational significance as an intact representative footbridge structure by this firm, rare for its high level of integrity. The steel footbridge and stairs at Tempe Railway Station are also of aesthetic significance as a landmark structure within the relatively visually isolated setting of the station. Tempe Railway Station is of aesthetic significance generally for its setting, with open space to the west, the Cooks River to the south, and a densely built up residential area to the east.

The two 2nd class brick platform buildings are rare as Tempe is one of only 3 stations on the Illawarra line retaining platform buildings of this period and type (the others being Arncliffe and Sydenham), and the only station with two extant largely intact buildings of this period. The original 1918 overhead booking office is now considered rare (despite recladding).

Tempe railway station was listed on the New South Wales State Heritage Register on 2 April 1999 having satisfied the following criteria.

The place is important in demonstrating the course, or pattern, of cultural or natural history in New South Wales.

Tempe Railway Station is of State historical significance as a major station on the Illawarra line developed from 1884 in two distinct phases. The station retains two 1884 platform buildings, along with a 1918 overhead footbridge structure and stairs, and original (though reclad and re-roofed) 1918 overhead booking office.

The place has a strong or special association with a person, or group of persons, of importance of cultural or natural history of New South Wales's history.

The steel footbridge, stairs and newel posts have historical association with Dorman Long & Co, designers and manufacturers of the footbridge.

The place is important in demonstrating aesthetic characteristics and/or a high degree of creative or technical achievement in New South Wales.

The Tempe Railway Station 1884 platform buildings are of aesthetic significance as fine intact examples of vernacular railway platform buildings of the late Victorian period with some Victorian Rustic Gothic style influence.

The 1918 steel footbridge and stairs are of aesthetic significance as an intact representative footbridge structure designed and manufactured by Dorman Long & Co and are a landmark structure within the relatively visually isolated setting of the station.

Tempe Railway Station is also of aesthetic significance for its interesting setting, with open space to the west, the Cooks River to the south, and a densely built up residential area to the east.

The place has strong or special association with a particular community or cultural group in New South Wales for social, cultural or spiritual reasons.

The place has the potential to contribute to the local community's sense of place, and can provide a connection to the local community's past.

The place possesses uncommon, rare or endangered aspects of the cultural or natural history of New South Wales.

The two 2nd class brick platform buildings are rare as Tempe is one of only 3 stations on the Illawarra line retaining platform buildings of this period and type (the others being Arncliffe and Sydenham), and the only station with two extant largely intact buildings of this period. The original 1918 overhead booking office is now considered rare (despite recladding). The extant exterior and interior detailing of the 1884 platform buildings at Tempe is considered rare on the Illawarra line. The 1918 steel footbridge and stairs are considered rare for their level of intactness. The overhead booking office, originally one of 45 similar offices, is now considered rare (despite recladding).

The place is important in demonstrating the principal characteristics of a class of cultural or natural places/environments in New South Wales.

The 1918 footbridge and stairs are representative of Dorman Long & Co steel footbridge and stair structures of this period (30 such footbridges were built from 1909 to 1935, 28 in the Sydney metropolitan area). The 1884 platform buildings are representative of vernacular late Victorian period railway buildings (one of a set including St Peters, Sydenham) of 1880s railway platform buildings on the first section of the Illawarra line.

== Trackplan ==
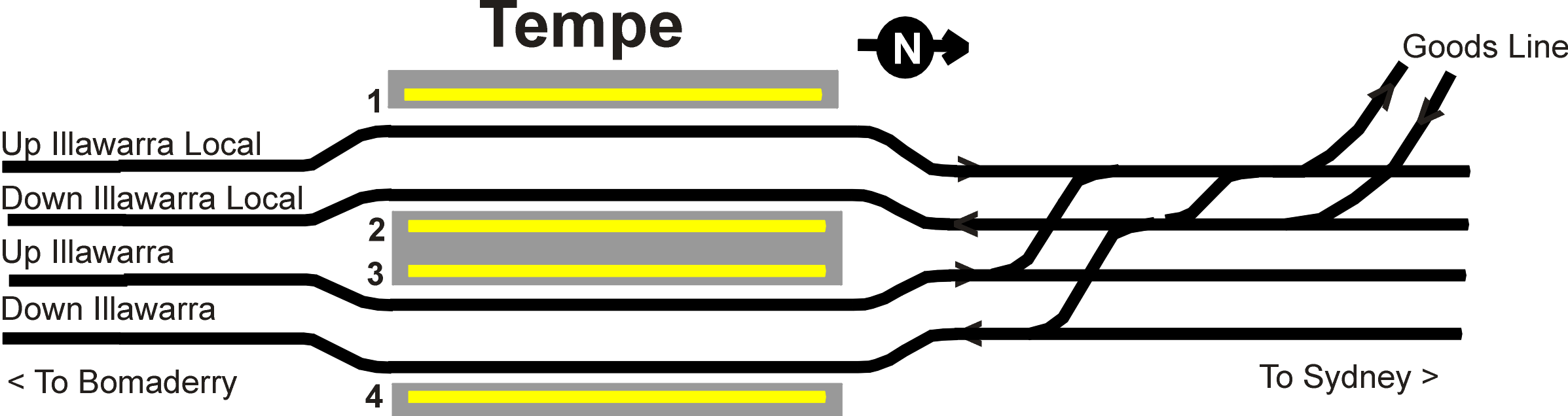
Track layout
