= Bexley North =

- Suburb
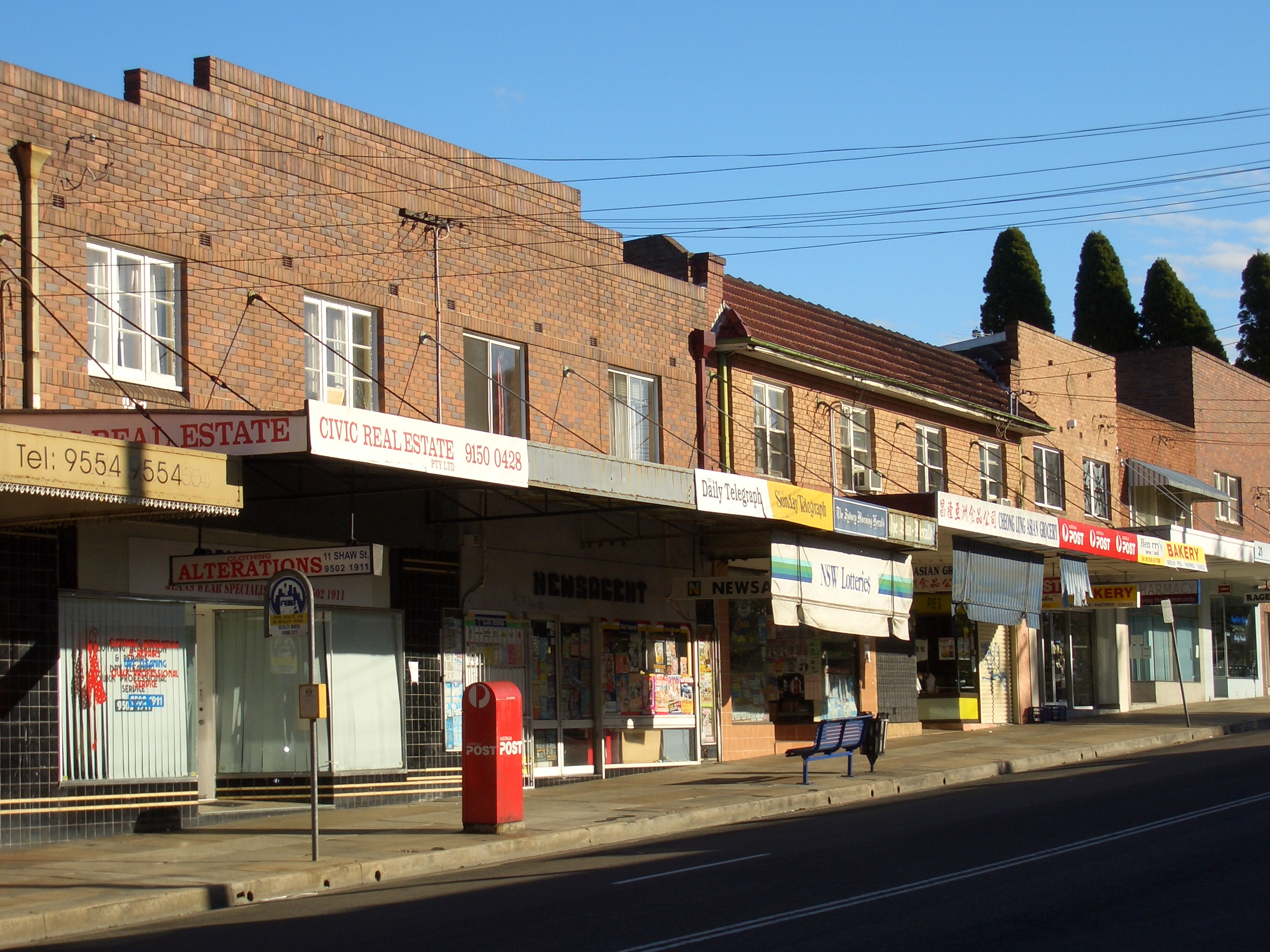
- Shaw Street c. 2006

- Interactive map of Bexley North
- Coordinates: 33°56′30″S 151°6′41″E
- Country: Australia
- State: New South Wales
- City: Sydney
- LGA: Bayside Council
- Location: 13 km (8.1 mi) south-west of Sydney CBD

Government
  - State electorates: Kogarah; Rockdale
  - Federal division: Barton
- Elevation: 22 m (72 ft)

Population
  - Total: 4,281 (2021 census)
- Postcode: 2207
Suburbs around Bexley North
Kingsgrove	Clemton Park	Earlwood
Kingsgrove	Bexley North	Bardwell Park
Bexley	Bexley	Bexley

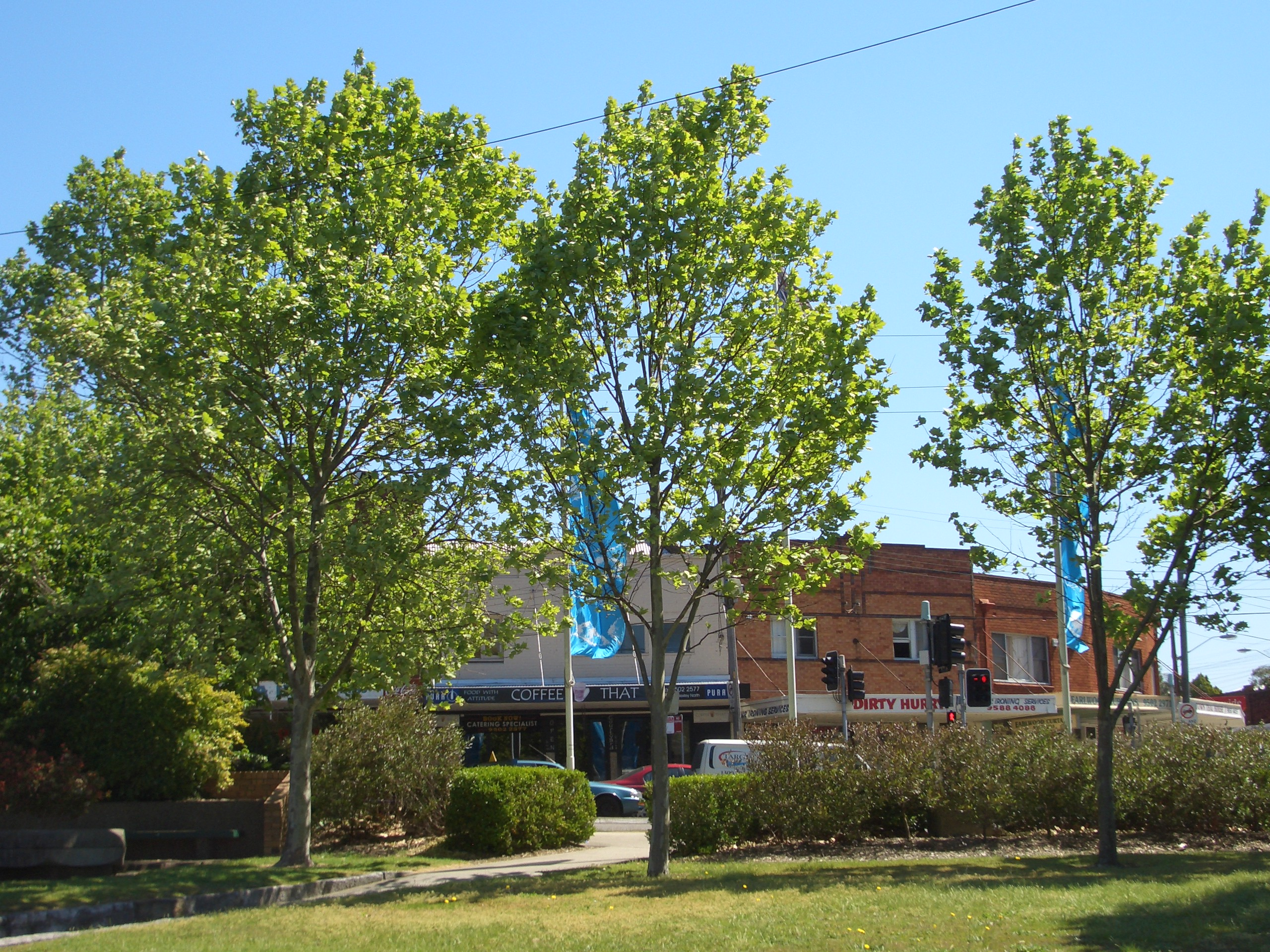
Corner of Bexley Road and Slade Road

Bexley North is a suburb in southern Sydney, in the state of New South Wales, Australia, 13 kilometres (8.1 miles) south-west of the Sydney CBD. It is part of the St George area. Bexley North is in the local government area of the Bayside Council.

== History ==
James Chandler named Bexley after his birthplace in London (formerly Kent), England. Chandler bought Sylvester's Farm in 1822, from Thomas Sylvester who had been granted the land about ten years earlier. That year he was also granted 1,200 acres (4.9 km^{2}) of land which stretched from what is now Bexley North to most of Rockdale and Kogarah. Development in the area began in 1884 with the railway line to Hurstville.

The opening of the East Hills line and the railway station at Bexley North in 1931, opened up the area for home sites.

== Commercial area ==
Bexley North is mostly a residential suburb with a small shopping centre located around the intersection of Bexley Road with Slade Road and Shaw Street, close to Bexley North railway station. It features a Woolworths Metro supermarket, a pub, specialty shops including a prominently placed funeral parlour, cafes and restaurants.

== Transport ==
Bexley North railway station is on the Airport & South Line of the Sydney Trains network. Bexley North is also serviced by Transit Systems bus routes and private bus routes.

The M5 South Western Motorway runs south-west towards Beverly Hills and Liverpool. There are no entrances at Bexley North to the 4 km tunnel which begins here and heads north-east towards Botany and the city. Access to the north east of the motorway is allowed at Kingsgrove and Arncliffe.

== Landmarks ==
- Bardwell Creek and the Prime Minister's Walk to Bexley Pool
- Bexley North Hotel
- Bexley North Library
- Bexley North Public School
- Bexley North Scout Hall
- Holy Trinity Anglican Church
- Stotts Reserve

== Demographics ==
According to the 2021 census of population, there were 4,281 people usually resident in Bexley North. 57.7% of people were born in Australia. The next most common countries of birth were China 6.6% and Greece 5.5%. 43.0% of people only spoke English at home. Other languages spoken at home included Greek 16.0%, Cantonese 6.4%, Arabic 6.0% and Mandarin 5.9%. The most common responses for religion were Eastern Orthodox 23.5%, No Religion 23.3% and Catholic 21.1%.

== Notable residents ==
- Tim Cahill, Australian footballer, playing for the Socceroos and Everton was a student at Bexley North Primary School.
- Anthony Totten, former Professional Rugby League footballer, grew up in the suburb.
- Bob Windle, gold medalist in the Men's 1500m Swimming Freestyle at the 1964 Summer Olympics, grew up in the suburb.
