= Western Outfall Main Sewer =

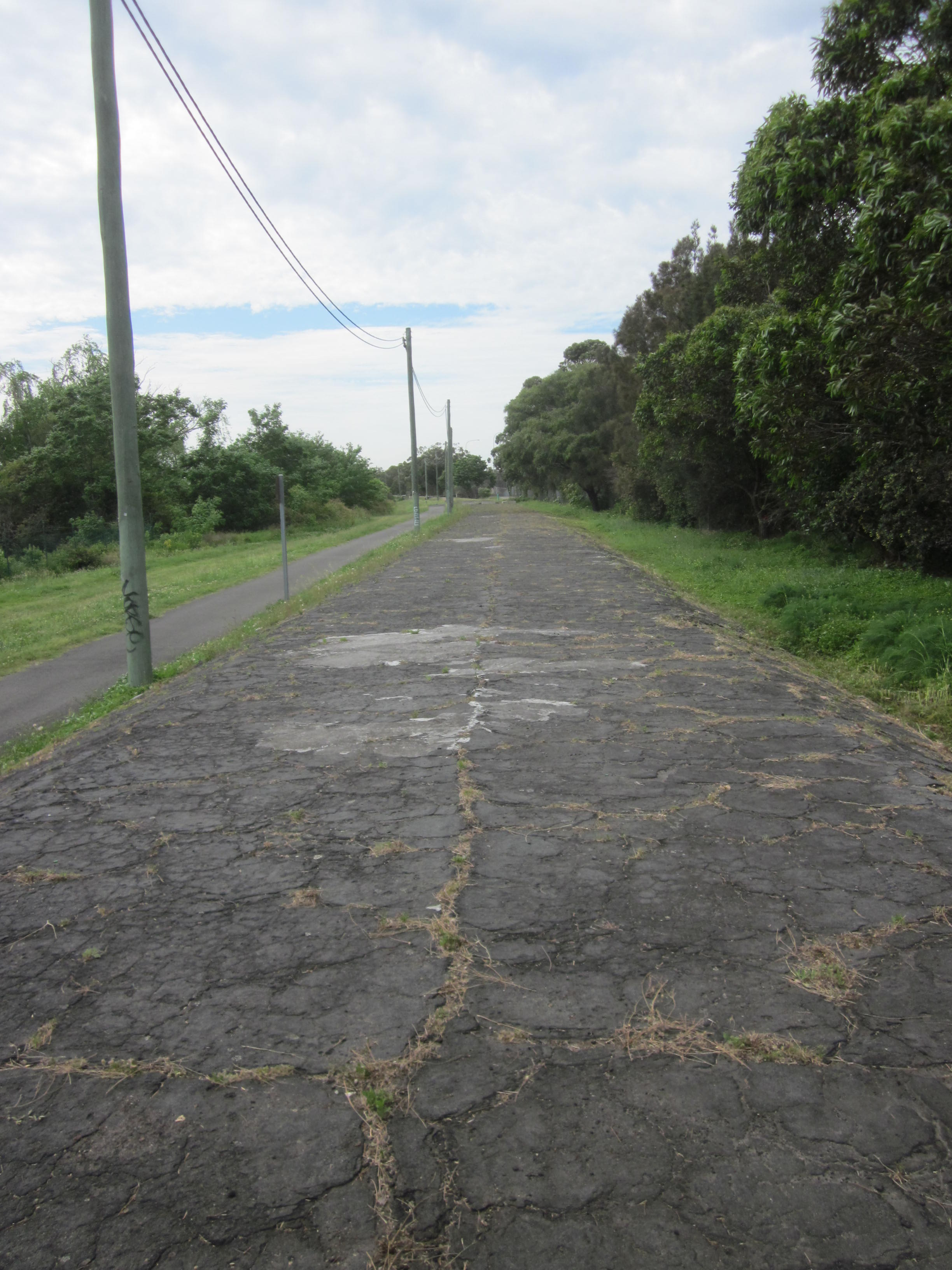
- Section of the western outfall main sewer near Valda Street Arncliffe

- Location within Sydney Location within Australia
- 33°56′00″S 151°09′01″E
- Location: Valda Avenue (off south side of Kogarah Golf Course), Arncliffe, Bayside Council, New South Wales, Australia

History
- Built: 1895–1898

Site notes
- Architect: NSW Department of Public Works
- Owner: Sydney Water

New South Wales Heritage Register
- Official name: Western Outfall Main Sewer; SWSOOS No1; Western Main Carrier; Kogarah Golf Course; Western Main Outfall Sewer
- Type: State heritage (built)
- Designated: 15 November 2002
- Reference no.: 1647
- Type: Sewage Pipe
- Category: Utilities - Sewerage
- Builders: New South Wales Department of Public Works

Western Outfall Main Sewer is a heritage-listed former sewage farm outfall sewer and now ocean outfall sewer near Valda Avenue (off south side of Kogarah Golf Course), Arncliffe, Bayside Council, New South Wales, Australia. It was designed by the New South Wales Department of Public Works, who built the sewer from 1895 to 1898. It is also known as SWSOOS No. 1, Western Main Carrier and Western Main Outfall Sewer. The property is owned by Sydney Water. It was added to the New South Wales State Heritage Register on 15 November 2002.

== History ==
In 1859, Sydney's sewerage system consisted of five outfall sewers which drained to Sydney Harbour. By the 1870s, the Harbour had become grossly polluted and, as a result, the government created the Sydney City and Suburban Health Board to investigate an alternative means of disposing of the city's sewage. This led to the construction of two gravitation sewers in 1889 by the Public Works Department: a northern sewer discharging to the ocean near Bondi and a southern sewer draining to a sewage farm at Botany Bay.

In 1888, the new Board of Water Supply and Sewerage was created, and in 1889, it took over the old outfall sewers and the PWD new works. The new works formed the basis of the two ocean outfall sewers which still serve the greater Sydney area south of the harbour: the Bondi Ocean Outfall Sewer (BOOS); and the Southern and Western Suburbs Ocean Outfall Sewer (SWSOOS No. 1).

SWSOOS No1 consisted of two main sewer lines: the Southern Outfall Sewer, which was the first built in 1886 and ran northwards through the suburbs of Waterloo and Redfern, and reached the sewage farm by means of an inverted syphon passing under the Cooks River; and the Western Outfall Main Sewer which came into operation in 1898 and ran westwards from the sewage farm, before curling north to cross Wolli Creek and Cooks River to divide into three main branches which serve suburbs such as Strathfield, Burwood, Ashfield, Drummoyne, Leichhardt, Newtown, etc.

The SWSOOS is now Sydney's largest sewage system, and because of its size, it is now designated in two main parts: No. 1 SWSOOS which serves Sydney's more southern suburbs; and No. 2 SWSOOS which serves Sydney's more south-western suburbs. The first section of the original Western Outfall Main Sewer, then known as "The Main Carrier", was an 804 metre long concrete open trough which then changed to three barrels which terminated at the Premier Street Penstock Chamber, where three main branches join. Along the way, the sewer crosses Wolli Creek and Cooks River on an aqueduct and bridge.

== Description ==
The subject of this listing is that section of the sewer between Valda Avenue, Arncliffe and the SWSOOS merging chamber on the south side of Kogarah Golf Course. This section of the sewer consists of three 1.83m diameter brick barrels which are hidden by concrete and masonry encasement. The southerly end of this section of the sewer is supported on concrete arches, which now are completely obscured by fill and encasement.

It is substantially intact.

== Heritage listing ==
The Valda Avenue, Arncliffe to SWSOOS Merging Chamber section of the original Western Outfall Main Sewer is of historical and technical significance. Historically, it is an original section of one of Sydney's oldest main sewers, built in the 1890s to end the discharge of sewage into Sydney Harbour. Its flow originally terminated at the former Botany Sewage Farm (which was one of only two known large scale sewage farms built in Australia during the 19th century), with which it has close temporal and locational associations. Technically, the three brick barrels, which are encased in concrete, are an excellent example of the oviform brick construction method of the time, which have provided continuous service for over 100 years.

Western Outfall Main Sewer was listed on the New South Wales State Heritage Register on 15 November 2002 having satisfied the following criteria.

The place is important in demonstrating the course, or pattern, of cultural or natural history in New South Wales.

This section of the Western Outfall Main Sewer is of historical significance, being one of Sydney's earliest main sewers, built in the 1890s to end the discharge sewage into Sydney Harbour. It is also significant for its association with the former Botany Sewage Farm, which it served until 1916, when the farm was superseded by the SWSOOS No .1.

The place is important in demonstrating aesthetic characteristics and/or a high degree of creative or technical achievement in New South Wales.

Item does not have any notable outstanding aesthetic values.

The place has strong or special association with a particular community or cultural group in New South Wales for social, cultural or spiritual reasons.

Item is listed on the National Trust (NSW) register and is thus recognised by an identifiable group, and as such has importance to the broader community.

The place has potential to yield information that will contribute to an understanding of the cultural or natural history of New South Wales.

The three barrels are an excellent example of the oviform brick construction method of the period, which have been in continuous operation for over 100 years and continues to give excellent service.

The place possesses uncommon, rare or endangered aspects of the cultural or natural history of New South Wales.

The brick barrels are a rare and unusual example of late 19th century sewer construction and are part of the highly significant SWSOOS sewer system which is the largest in the SWC system and likely NSW.

The place is important in demonstrating the principal characteristics of a class of cultural or natural places/environments in New South Wales.

The brick barrels are a representative example of late 19th century sewage construction.

== See also ==
- Sydney Water
