= Sir Roden Cutler VC Memorial Interchange =

Roden Cutler Interchange New South Wales
- Coordinates: 33°57′04″S 150°52′44″E

General information
- Type: Road junction
- Junction type: Hybrid semidirectional T interchange
- Location: Prestons, New South Wales
- Opened: December 2005
- Built by: Leighton Contractors, Abigroup
- Maintained by: Transport for NSW
- Roads at junction: M5 South-West Motorway; Westlink M7; Hume Motorway

Location(s)
- LGA(s): City of Liverpool

The Sir Roden Cutler VC Memorial Interchange, often shortened to Roden Cutler Interchange and sign-posted as Cutler VC Interchange, is a three-level motorway interchange located in Prestons in South-West Sydney. The interchange forms the junction of the Westlink M7, M5 South-West and M31 Hume Motorways, opening to traffic in December 2005 along with the Westlink M7. It is a major urban feature of the National Highway network with roads linking Sydney south to Canberra and Melbourne and north to Newcastle and Brisbane converging at the interchange.

As with many features of the Remembrance Driveway between Sydney and Canberra, the interchange is named in honour of an Australian Victoria Cross recipient. Sir Roden Cutler received the medal for gallantry in the face of the enemy while serving with the Royal Australian Artillery in Syria during World War II. He would later hold the office of Governor of New South Wales.

== Design ==
Following a request for tender in 2001, a joint venture between engineering firms Leighton Contractors and Abigroup were awarded the contract in 2003 to design and construct the Westlink M7 motorway and interchanges.

The interchange is a hybrid of the semidirectional T interchange configuration, with added complexity through the retention and modification of the Camden Valley Way partial diamond interchange over the Hume Motorway. Slip roads allow access to both the M5 eastbound and M7 northbound, as well as exit from the Hume Motorway onto Camden Valley Way. Access is also provided to the suburban street network at Beech Road from the westbound lanes of the M5, necessitating three levels of ramps.

== Landscaping ==
The interchange surrounds a landmark 25 m (82 ft) high grass-covered pyramid made from compacted soil excavated during construction of the M7. The pyramid is illuminated at night by blue LED lighting. Complementing the pyramid, forty-five timber poles line the edges of the interchange, symbolic of the native woodlands depleted by urban development in the area.

On 15 November 2010, the Australian Defence Force Memorial Plantation was dedicated. Consisting of 45,000 native trees and shrubs, the plantation lines along the Hume Motorway reservation approaching the Roden Cutler Interchange from the Mount Annan Botanic Garden, a distance of 15.5 km (9.6 mi).
