= M5 Motorway (Sydney) =

Motorway in Sydney, Australia

M5 Motorway New South Wales

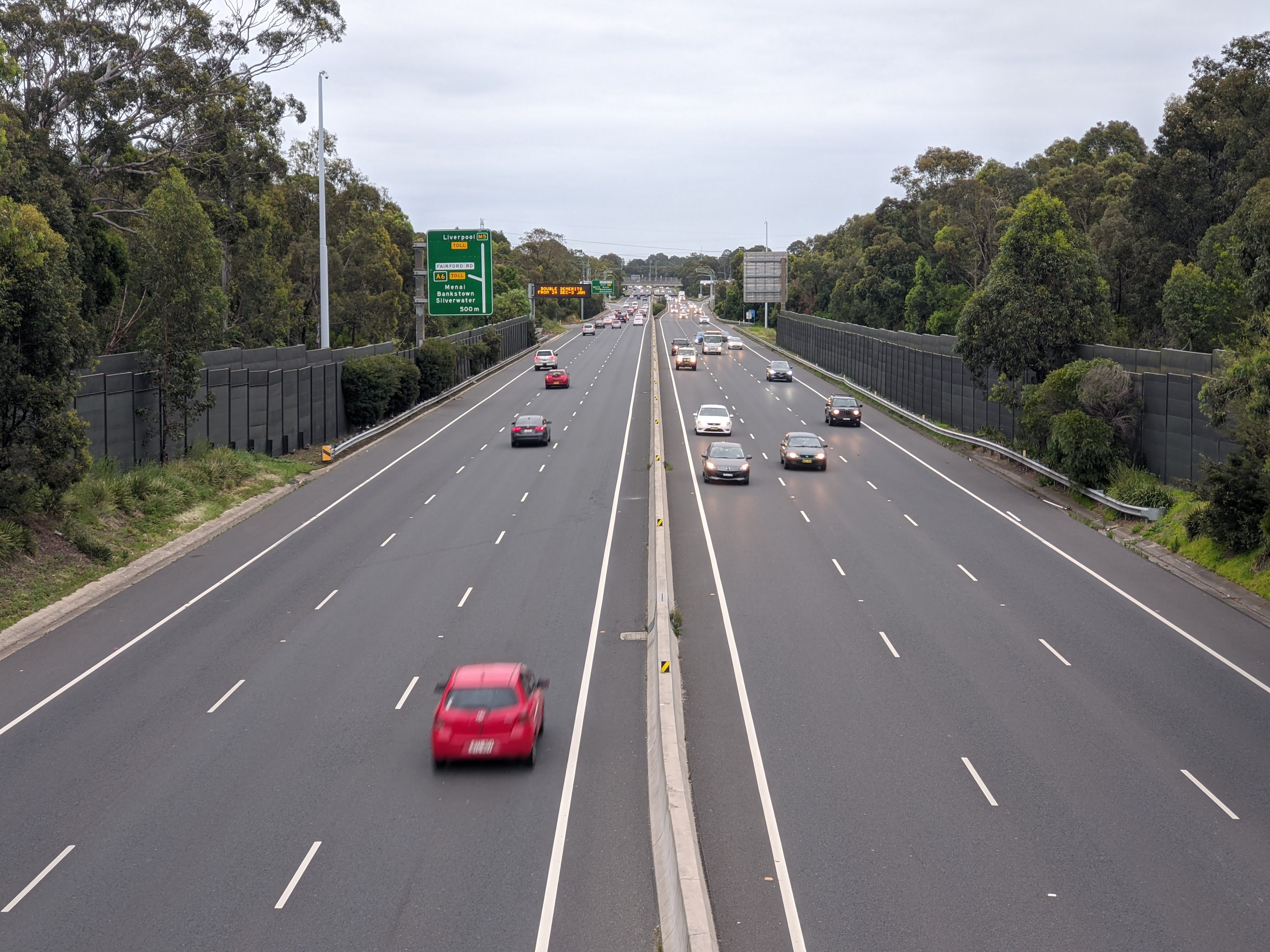
- Looking west along the M5 motorway east of the interchange with Fairford Road, Riverwood
- Coordinates: 33.955866°S 150.876709°E (West end); 33.946192°S 151.170495°E (East end)

General information
- Type: Motorway
- Length: 28.8 km (18 mi)
- Opened: 1992–94 (Prestons–Beverly Hills); 2001 (Beverly Hills–Mascot)
- Gazetted: June 1993
- Route number(s): M5 (2013–present)
- Former route number: Metroad 5 (1993–2013)

Major junctions
- West end: Hume Motorway; Prestons, New South Wales
- Westlink M7; Hume Highway; Fairford Road; King Georges Road; M8 Motorway; Princes Highway
- East end: General Holmes Drive; Mascot, New South Wales

Location(s)
- Major suburbs: Bankstown, Moorebank, Liverpool

Highway system
- Highways in Australia; National Highway • Freeways in Australia; Highways in New South Wales

The M5 Motorway is a 28.8-kilometre (17.9 mi) series of tolled motorways located in Sydney, New South Wales, designated as route M5. It is part of the Sydney Orbital Network.

The M5 Motorway comprises two connected parts:

- South West Motorway is a toll road operated by Interlink Roads, between the Roden Cutler Interchange in Prestons (where the M5 meets Westlink M7 and Hume Motorway) and the interchange with King Georges Road at Beverly Hills. The section between Hammondville and Beverly Hills is tolled under the M5 South West tolls.
- The M5 East is an above-ground road from King Georges Road east to Bexley Road which continues into a 4-kilometre (2.5 mi) tunnel from Bexley North to Arncliffe that opened in December 2001 to connect with General Holmes Drive at Mascot. The section between King Georges Road and Marsh Street is tolled since July 2020.

The M8 Motorway also runs roughly parallel to the M5 East and links it at Kingsgrove to the Rozelle Interchange along separate twin tunnels. Both the M5 East and M8 motorway are tolled as part of WestConnex, separate to the M5 South West tolls. This results in two separate tolls when travelling along the M5 between Moorebank and Mascot.

== Route ==
South West Motorway commences at the Roden Cutler Interchange (where it meets Hume Motorway and Westlink M7) in Prestons and heads in a northeasterly direction as a six-lane, dual-carriageway road, widening to 8 lanes at the interchange with Hume Highway in southern Liverpool and heading in an easterly direction, crossing the Main Southern railway line and then the Georges River into Moorebank, then narrowing back to six lanes at the interchange with Heathcote Road at Wattle Grove. It becomes the M5 East at the interchange with King Georges Road in Beverly Hills, and just east of this interchange it widens to ten lanes to accommodate the portals to the M8 Motorway, then narrows back to four lanes afterwards and enters the M5 East tunnels at the interchange with Bexley Road, emerging four kilometres later in Arncliffe. It then crosses under the Cooks River to eventually terminate with General Holmes Drive at Mascot.

The M5 cycleway is located on the breakdown lanes of the M5 South West Motorway, and runs off-road parallel to the M5 East between King Georges Road and Arncliffe.

== History ==
=== South West Motorway ===
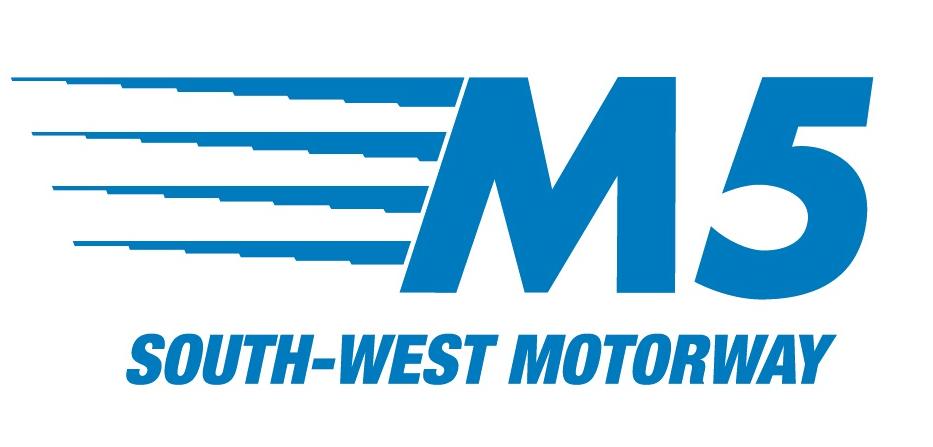
Logo of South West Motorway

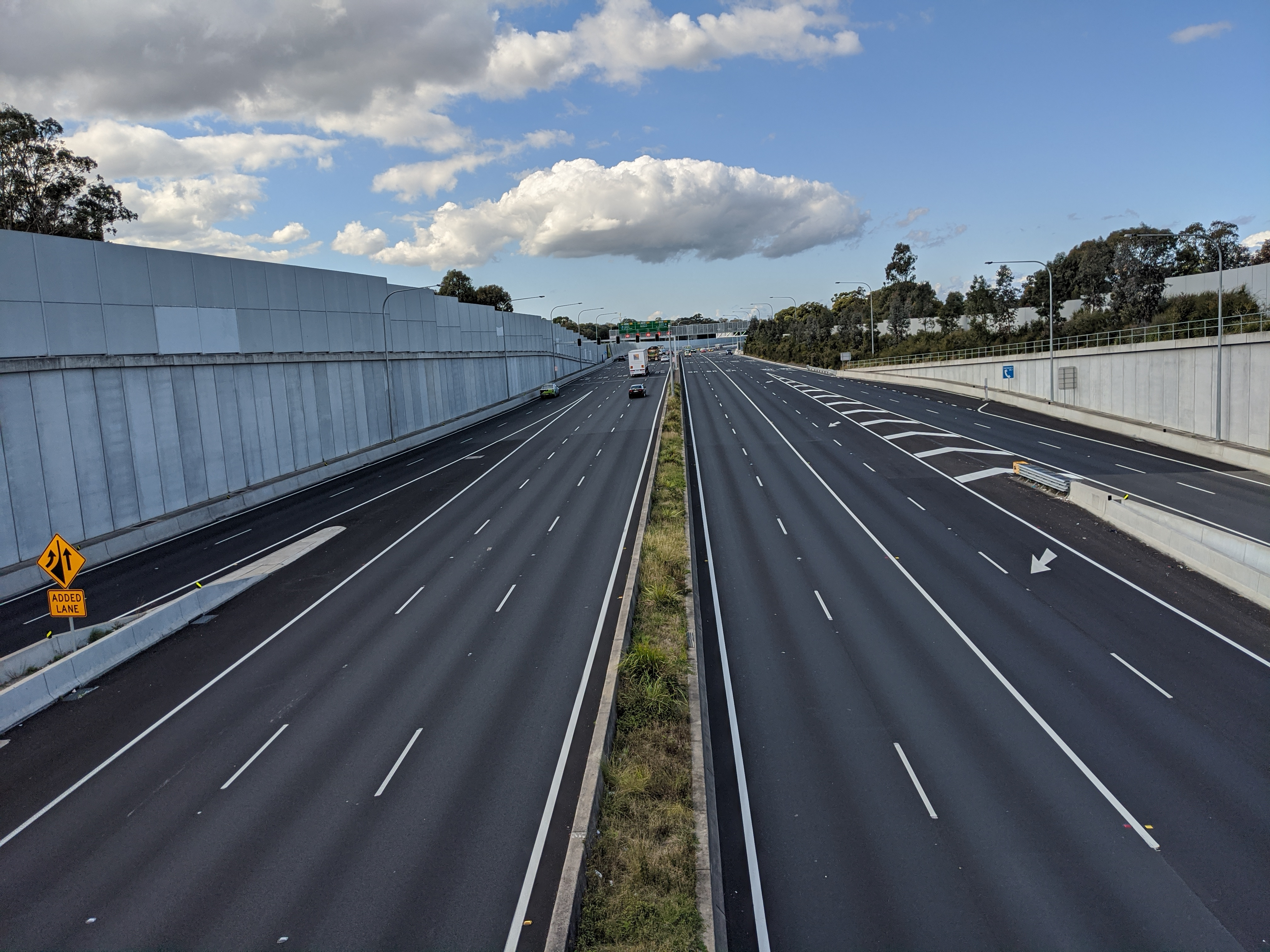
Looking eastbound towards the M8 tunnel portal

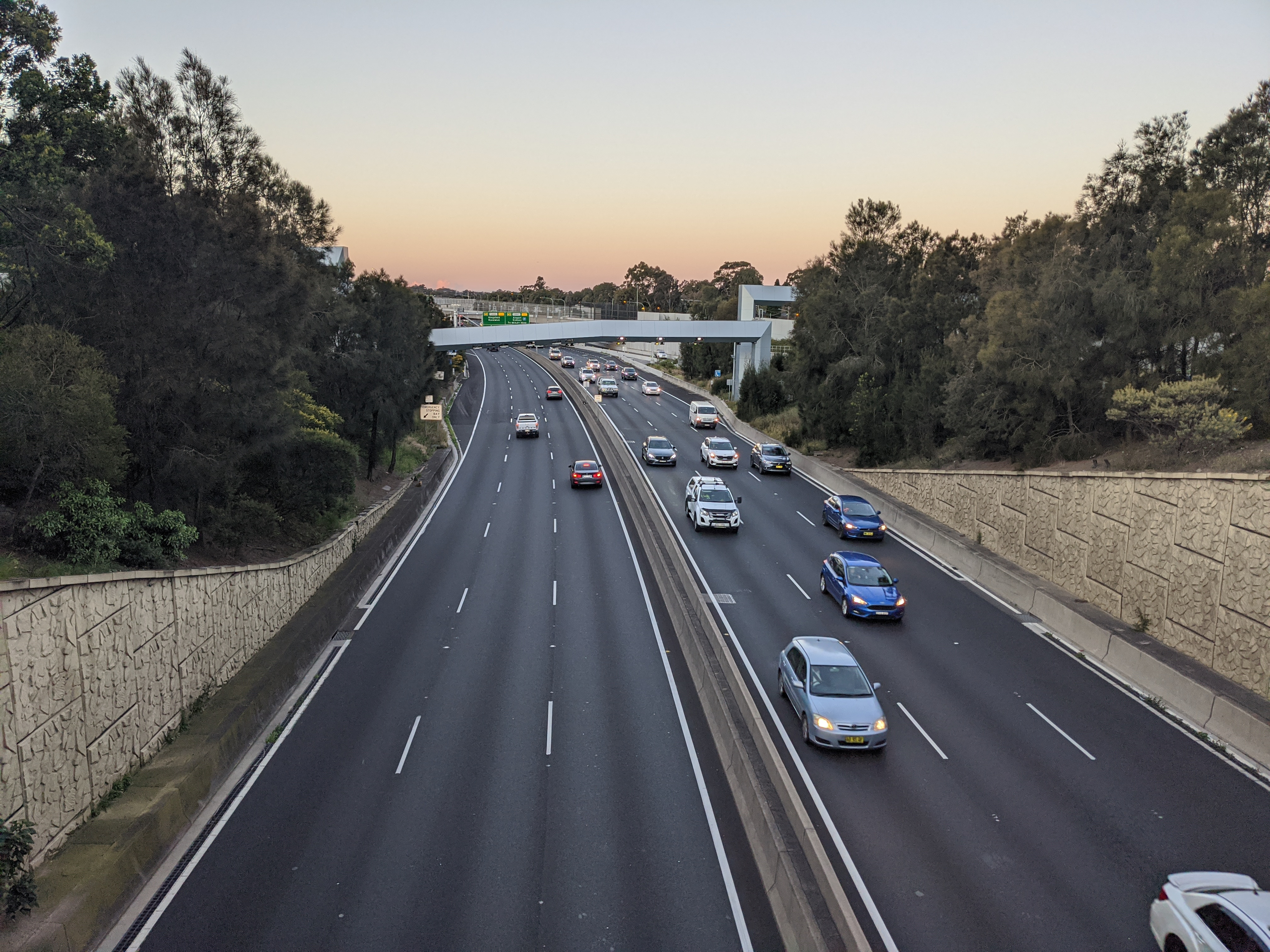
Looking westbound near Kingsgrove

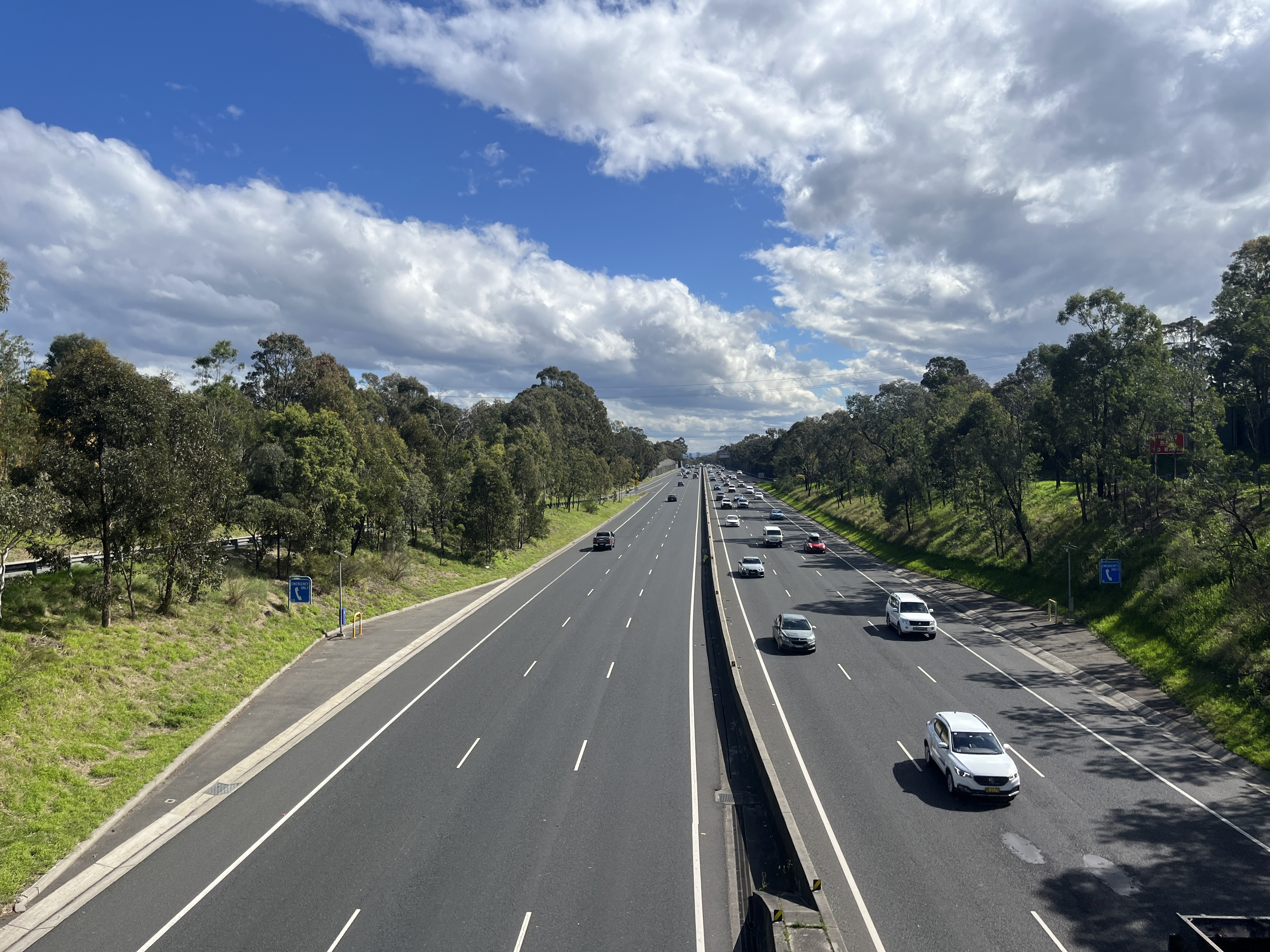
Looking westbound from an overpass at Revesby

South West Motorway replaced Hume Highway (Liverpool Road) as the primary route from Liverpool to the Sydney CBD. In the 1980s, the Hume Highway (National Highway 31) ended at Crossroads, just before Liverpool. This stretch of freeway (Campbelltown to Crossroads) was previously known as South Western Freeway, designated F5.

The South Western Freeway is different to the M5 South West Motorway. From then on, to proceed to the city, the alternatives were either Liverpool Road (then National Route 31) or Newbridge and Canterbury Roads (then State Route 54) via Bankstown. Both routes had many traffic lights and were (and still are) heavily congested.

An initial stretch of the motorway was built and completed in February 1985 to link Heathcote Road at Moorebank and Hume Highway at Casula, including a bridge across the Georges River near Casula. It was built as a single carriageway and included a traffic light controlled, at-grade intersection at Moorebank Avenue.

After years of proposals and political promises, a privately constructed and operated motorway – the M5 South West Motorway – was built under a Build-Operate-Transfer agreement, which was awarded to Interlink Roads. The motorway was constructed on a publicly owned freeway reservation, between the existing road at Heathcote Road, Moorebank, to King Georges Road, Beverly Hills. It was constructed in two stages:

- Stage 1: between Hume Highway and The River Road
- Stage 2: between The River Road and King Georges Road

Stage 1 and a portion of Stage 2 (The River Road to Fairford Road) of the motorway opened in August 1992, with the remaining portion of Stage 2 opened in October 1992. The motorway was "completed" months ahead of schedule, even though the proposed link between the Cross Roads and Casula (Casula bypass) had yet to be constructed, and a third of the "motorway" existed only as single-carriageway road between the Fairford Road and King Georges Road interchanges, remarkably located at the busier city end of the road.

Under the original contract in 1991, Interlink Roads would operate and toll the motorway for a concession of 22 years after opening. This meant that the toll concession was originally scheduled to end in August 2014.

Metroad 5 was introduced in late 1992 along with other Metroads and was signed in February 1993. South West Motorway, from Beverly Hills to Moorebank and Crossroads to Campbelltown, along with Hume Highway, from Moorebank to Crossroads, were allocated Metroad 5. The Casula Bypass opened in June 1994, and the Hume Highway section of Metroad 5 was realigned to the bypass and the entire South West Motorway therefore had the route allocation of Metroad 5. As part of the Casula Bypass works, the toll concession was extended from August 2014 to June 2022.

The passing of the Main Roads Act of 1924 through the Parliament of New South Wales provided for the declaration of Main Roads, roads partially funded by the State government through the Main Roads Board. With the subsequent passing of the Main Roads (Amendment) Act of 1929 to provide for additional declarations of State Highways and Trunk Roads, the Roads & Traffic Authority (the eventual successor to the Main Roads Board) declared South West Motorway as a motorway (under plan number 6005), on 28 June 1993, and was re-declared to cover each extension until it reached its eastern terminus in Mascot in 2001; the tollway today still retains this declaration (under Tollway 6005).

As part of the construction of the M5 East, the eastern two-lane, single carriageway section of South West Motorway was widened to a full 4 lane, dual-carriageway road between June 1997 and August 1999, finally bringing most of the motorway up to complete freeway standard. This also included the opening of east-facing ramps and toll plazas at The River Road and Fairford Road. However, the at-grade intersection at Moorebank Avenue still remained, posing a constraint on traffic flow. In January 2003, a grade-separated interchange at Moorebank Avenue was completed, meaning that not only the entire length of Metroad 5 was now freeway standard but also the entire route from Canberra to Sydney, and Melbourne to Sydney, was now high-speed dual carriageway. However, the toll concession was also extended from June 2022 to August 2023.

With the completion of the Westlink M7 motorway in December 2005, the Roden Cutler Interchange was added at Prestons to allow traffic from the south to access western Sydney or bypass the city altogether.

Between 2012 and 2014, the motorway was widened to three lanes in each direction. As part of widening works, the toll concession was extended for the third time to 10 December 2026.

New eastward-facing ramps at Belmore Road were constructed and opened on 5 February 2019.

==== Toll ====
The ownership of M5 South West Motorway is split between the state government and Interlink Roads, the latter is 100% owned by Transurban. The state government owns the section between Hume Highway and Heathcote Road, with Interlink Roads owning the remainder of the motorway including the Casula Bypass. However, the Casula Bypass is not tolled.

Interlink Roads was initially equally owned by Leighton and Commonwealth Bank. Leighton sold its 50% shareholding to Macquarie Infrastructure Group (MIG) in December 1996, while Commonwealth Bank sold 34.6% of its shareholding to Utilities Trust of Australia and its remaining 15.4% shareholding to AMP Limited in December 1998. AMP in turn sold some of its shareholding to Retail Employees Superannuation and Sunsuper in 1999.

Sydney Roads Group was spun off from Macquarie Infrastructure Group in June 2006, including its 50% stake in Interlink Roads. Transurban first acquired ownership of Interlink Roads in April 2007 when it acquired Sydney Roads Group. By 2012, the shareholders of Interlink Roads were:

- Transurban (50%)
- Utilities Trust of Australia (UTA) (19.23%)
- IFM Investors (15.38%)
- BNP Paribas Nominees Pty Ltd (8.24%), formerly known as Cogent Nominees Pty Ltd (2002–2012) and AMP Nominees Pty Ltd (prior to 2002)
- State Street Corporation, as trustees of Retail Employees Superannuation (4.4%) and Sunsuper Superannuation Fund (2.75%)

Transurban gained majority control of Interlink Roads when it acquired BNP's 8.24% stake on 18 September 2018, before acquiring the 7.14% stakes from Rest Super and Sunsuper on 3 December 2018, increasing its shareholding to 65.38%. Transurban acquired the remaining 34.62% stake from IFM and Utilities Trust of Australia on 30 October 2019.

The motorway east of Heathcote Road is tolled by Interlink Roads at a single price, with toll gantries located at Hammondville and at east-facing ramps at Henry Lawson Drive, The River Road, Fairford Road and Belmore Road. The motorway is tolled separately to the M5 East. Regular users of the motorway can claim a rebate from the state government for the cost of the toll, excluding GST, as part of a 1995 election commitment by Bob Carr, who eventually won the election and became Premier of New South Wales. On 1 July 2013, the M5 South West became the last motorway in Australia to convert to cashless tolling.

The current toll concession held by Interlink Roads is due to expire on 10 December 2026, after it was extended for three times since opening. As part of the acquisition of WestConnex by a Transurban-led consortium, the M5 South West Motorway will be transferred to WestConnex ownership when the Interlink Roads concession ends in 2026, and will then be tolled as part of WestConnex together with M5 East.

Toll prices as of 1 July 2025
Toll road	Class A toll prices (Note: Class A vehicles are typically cars and motorcycles; Class B vehicles are all other vehicles including trucks and heavy vehicles.)	Class B toll prices	Toll increase	Toll concessionaire	Expiry of toll concession
M5 South-West Motorway	$5.83	$17.48	Quarterly on 1 January, 1 April, 1 July, and 1 October by positive quarterly CPI	Interlink Roads (100% Transurban)	10 December 2026 (Note: After 10 December 2026, WestConnex distance-based tolls apply to the M5 South-West.)

=== M5 East ===
M5 East main tunnel
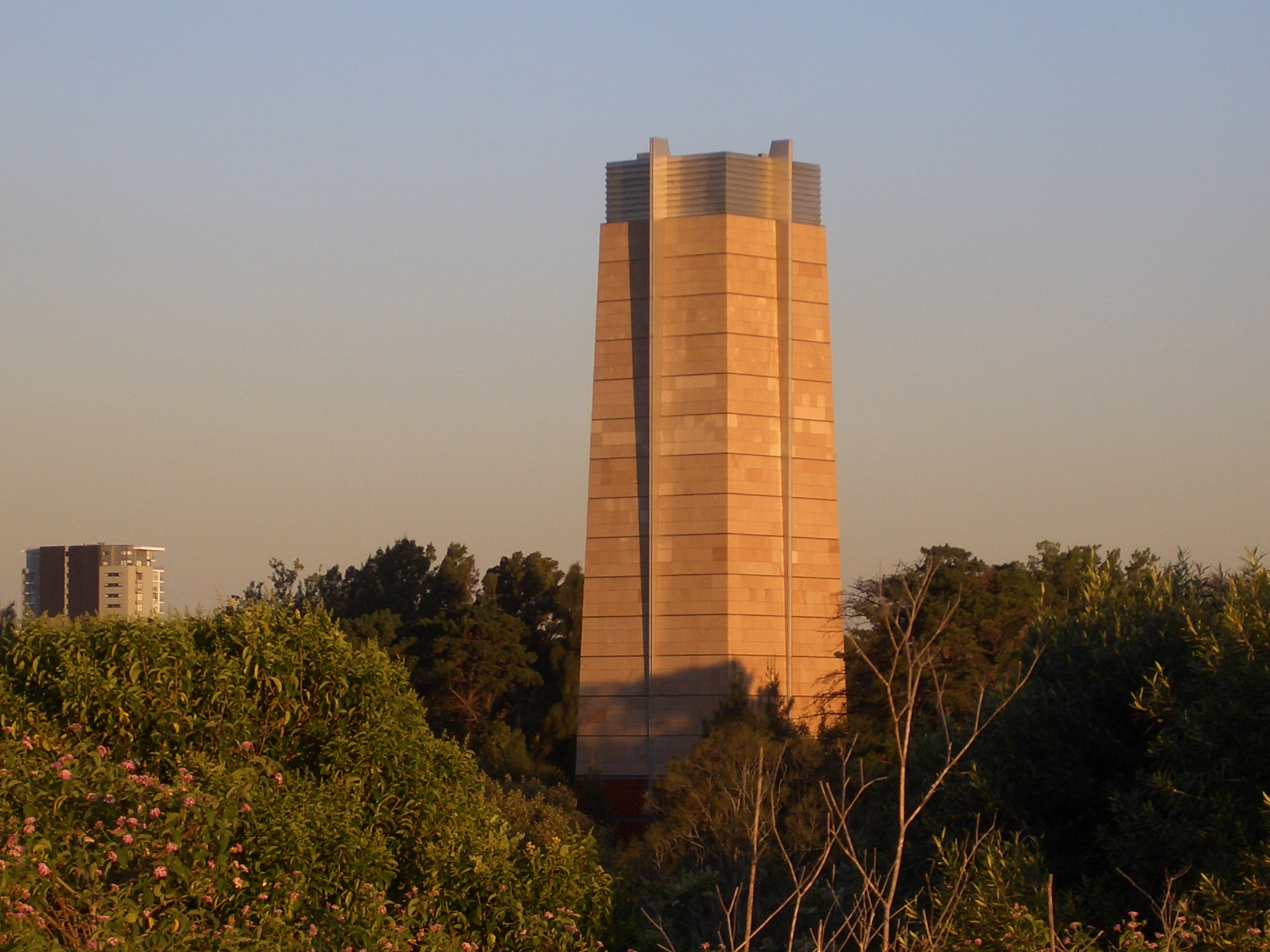
- M5 East tunnel ventilation stack at Turrella

Overview
- Location: Bexley North, New South Wales
- Start: Bexley Road, Bexley North
- End: Marsh Street, Arncliffe

Operation
- Work began: December 1997
- Opened: December 2001
- Owner: Transport for NSW
- Operator: WestConnex
- Traffic: Automotive

Technical
- Length: 4 kilometres (2.5 mi)
- No. of lanes: 2 lanes each way
- Operating speed: 80 km/h (50 mph) (variable)
- Tunnel clearance: 4.6 metres (15 ft)

The M5 East is the eastern section of the M5 between King Georges Road at Beverly Hills and General Holmes Drive at Mascot, and includes two 4 km tunnels between Bexley North and Arncliffe, and another tunnel under the Cooks River.

After the Casula Bypass from Cross Roads to Casula was completed in 1994, the M5 South West Motorway still abruptly ended at King Georges Road, meaning that motorway traffic was forced onto congested roads to complete the journey into the city. Roads & Traffic Authority (RTA) released the Environmental Impact Assessment of the M5 East Motorway for public consultation in June 1994, which proposed:

- Duplicating the existing single-lane M5 South West Motorway (opened 1992) between Fairford Road and King Georges Road
- New tolled motorway between King Georges Road and General Holmes Drive at Mascot, adjacent to Sydney Airport, including tunnels between Bexley North and Turrella and a viaduct between Turrella and Marsh Street
- An overpass over King Georges Road, with the embankment to be filled by spoil from the tunnel excavation

The toll plaza was proposed to be located near Garema Circuit, Armitree Street and Glamis Street in Kingsgrove.

Many of the public submissions raised during the EIS consultation were concerned with the visual impact of the proposed elevated motorway through Turrella, and the impact on residences in Arncliffe. In response to comments, it was announced in August 1995 that RTA would examine alternatives to the proposal between Bexley Road and Cooks River. In December 1996, an alternative direct tunnel proposal was announced in a supplement report to the EIS (EIS supplement), which was exhibited for public consultation until February 1997. The alternative proposal proposed shorter and more direct tunnels between Bexley Road and Marsh Street. There would also be no tolls imposed on the motorway, as announced by the Minister for Roads a month prior. The proposed toll plaza would then be used as heavy vehicle inspection areas instead.

In response to submissions during the EIS supplement consultation, the proposal was further modified, reverting to an underpass below King Georges Road and a tunnel underneath Cooks River. The modified proposal was approved in November 1997 and would be built as a publicly-built and toll-free link known as the M5 East Freeway. Construction commenced in August 1998 and the M5 East was opened on 9 December 2001. Metroad 5 from Beverly Hills to the CBD, originally via Hume and Great Western Highway, was rerouted on the M5 East Freeway and ended at its terminus at General Holmes Drive.

Controversy surrounded the construction of the M5 East concerning the effect of the freeway on the local environment, especially upon parts of Wolli Creek, and the construction of ventilation stacks required to remove pollution from the tunnel, which, ostensibly due to cost, lack filtration systems. Since its opening, the M5 East has attracted criticism for its lack of capacity, being full from the day it was opened, given that the tunnels provide only two lanes of traffic in either direction, and no provision has been made for future expansion. Most congestion problems occur at the western end of the main tunnel, which is long and steep.

An addition lane for slow traffic begins at the western tunnel exit for a short distance, to remove slow and heavy traffic. Had this been extended into the tunnel for a few hundred metres, the capacity would be far greater. These steep entrances to the tunnelled section are also the site of frequent vehicle accidents, usually involving heavy traffic. Pollution and smog inside the tunnel has also been a major concern, after it was revealed that the New South Wales Department of Health advised the Roads & Traffic Authority that pollution levels in the tunnel exceeded acceptable limits during peak hours of use, and urged motorists using the tunnel to keep their windows up and putting their car's ventilation system on "recirculate".

The M5 East has been beset by many closures, due to accidents and computer failures within the tunnel, which cause gridlock. Between 2002 and 2008 there were six closures attributed to technical and computer failures alone in the tunnel. The Government of New South Wales must pay penalties to the operators of the M5 East, BHBB, due to more traffic using the M5 than originally forecast. The penalties were expected to amount to $13 million by 2011. Some of this increase in demand was caused by the State Government's "Cashback" scheme, which involves public money subsidising motorists for using the adjoining, tolled M5 South West Motorway.

Both the South West Motorway (to its interchange with Metroad 9 along Narellan Road) and the M5 East were designated as Metroad 5. With the conversion to the newer alphanumeric system in 2013, Metroad 5 was truncated back to the Roden Cutler Interchange (the former allocation renamed Hume Motorway and allocated M31) and replaced with route M5.

Between December 2011 and April 2020, the M5 East was operated and maintained by Leighton (and later Ventia) on behalf of Transport for NSW. On 1 May 2020, WestConnex took over the operations and maintenance of the tunnels. Following the commencement of tolls in July 2020, the M5 East ceased being a freeway.

==== New M5 ====
In 2009, the government released the M5 Transport Corridor Feasibility Study, which investigated strategic options for improving the M5 Motorway corridor. The study identified a preliminary preferred option, being the M5 East Duplication, consisted of duplicating the M5 East and construction of a new connection from the M5 East at Arncliffe to Euston Road, Qantas Drive and Gardeners Road. The strategic concept for the M5 East Duplication was placed on public exhibition between November 2009 and March 2010 for community and stakeholder feedback. Feedback received was used to further develop and refine the scheme. In 2012, the scheme become the King Georges Road Interchange Upgrade and New M5 projects, the second stage of WestConnex. The New M5 would consist of separate tunnels parallel to the M5 East tunnels and would later become known as M8 Motorway.

The M8 tunnels were completed in July 2020. The tunnels connect to the existing M5 East at Kingsgrove and run roughly parallel to M5 East to Rozelle Interchange, forming an inner CBD bypass.

==== Toll ====
Since 5 July 2020, when the M8 tunnels opened, the majority of the M5 East between King Georges Road and Marsh Street, as well as the M8 Motorway, is tolled by distance travelled as part of the WestConnex. A short section of the M5 East between Marsh Street and General Holmes Drive remains toll-free. As both the M5 East and M8 Motorway are tolled under WestConnex, a vehicle travelling on the M5 East (between King Georges Road and M8) and M8 together will only incur a single toll.

The M5 East and M8 Motorway toll charge consists of:

- a flagfall
- a charge per kilometre

Tolls for heavy vehicles are triple of cars and motorcycles. Toll prices increase by 4% or the consumer price index (CPI) every year, whichever is greater, until 2040, after which CPI will apply.

Toll prices as of 1 July 2025
Toll road	Class A toll prices (Note: Class A vehicles are typically cars and motorcycles; Class B vehicles are all other vehicles including trucks and heavy vehicles)			Class B toll prices	Toll increase	Toll concessionaire	Expiry of toll concession
Toll road	Flagfall	Charge per km	Toll cap	Class B toll prices	Toll increase	Toll concessionaire	Expiry of toll concession
WestConnex (M4, M5 East, M8)	$1.73	$0.6411	$12.25	3 x of Class A prices	Annually on 1 January, by the greater of CPI or 4% until December 2040, and then by positive CPI only	Sydney Transport Partners (9% Tawreed Investments 10.5% CPPIB, 10% Caisse de dépôt et placement du Québec (CDPQ), 20.5% Australian Super, 50% Transurban)	2060

== Exits and interchanges ==
LGA	Location	km	mi	Destinations	Notes
Liverpool	Prestons–Casula boundary	0.0	0.0	Hume Motorway (M31 south) – Campbelltown, Goulburn, Canberra, Melbourne	Roden Cutler Interchange; Western terminus of South Western Motorway and route M5, route M31 continues south along Hume Motorway
Liverpool	Prestons–Casula boundary	0.0	0.0	Westlink M7 (M7 north) – Eastern Creek, Bella Vista, Newcastle	
Liverpool	Prestons–Casula boundary	0.0	0.0	Camden Valley Way (A28 east, unallocated west) – Camden, Narellan, Casula, Liverpool	Partial diamond interchange; northbound entrance only
Liverpool	Prestons–Casula boundary	0.8	0.50	Beech Road – Prestons, Casula, Glenfield; Westlink M7 (M7 north) – Eastern Creek, Bella Vista, Newcastle	Westbound exit only
Liverpool	Casula–Liverpool boundary	4.2	2.6	Hume Highway (A28) – Liverpool, Ashfield, Casula, Campbelltown	Half-diamond interchange; eastbound entrance and westbound exit only
Liverpool	Casula–Liverpool boundary	4.6	2.9	Main Southern railway line	
Georges River		4.7	2.9	Georges River West Bridge	
Liverpool	Moorebank	5.2	3.2	Moorebank Avenue – Glenfield, Moorebank, Liverpool	Single-point urban interchange
Liverpool	Moorebank–Wattle Grove–Hammondville tripoint	6.9	4.3	Heathcote Road – Liverpool, Lucas Heights, Heathcote	Diamond interchange; no right turn from Heathcote Road southbound onto westbound entrance ramp M5 South West toll western terminus
Liverpool	Moorebank–Hammondville boundary	8.8	5.5	M5 South West toll point in both directions	
Georges River		9.6	6.0	Georges River East Bridge	
Canterbury-Bankstown	Milperra	10.7	6.6	Henry Lawson Drive – Milperra, East Hills, Peakhurst, Bankstown Airport	Diamond interchange; toll gantries on east-facing ramps
Canterbury-Bankstown	Revesby	14.1	8.8	The River Road – Revesby, Revesby Heights, to Georges River National Park	Diamond interchange; toll gantries on east-facing ramps
Canterbury-Bankstown	Padstow	15.7	9.8	Fairford Road (A6) – Bankstown, Carlingford, Menai, Heathcote	Single-point urban interchange; toll gantries on east-facing ramps
Canterbury-Bankstown	Riverwood	17.5	10.9	Belmore Road – Punchbowl, Riverwood, Lugarno	Diamond interchange; toll gantries on east-facing ramps
Canterbury-Bankstown	Beverly Hills	19.6	12.2	King Georges Road (A3) – Strathfield, Mona Vale, Hurstville, Blakehurst	Single-point urban interchange M5 South West Motorway eastern terminus; M5 East Motorway western terminus
Canterbury-Bankstown	Beverly Hills	19.6	12.2	Westconnex M5 East and M8 toll western end	
Canterbury-Bankstown	Kingsgrove	20.6	12.8	M8 Motorway (M8) – St Peters, Rozelle	Eastbound entrance and westbound exit only
Canterbury-Bankstown	Kingsgrove	21.9	13.6	Kingsgrove Road – Campsie, Belfield	Eastbound entrance and westbound exit only; No access to Bexley Road entrance/exit
Bayside	Kingsgrove–Earlwood boundary	22.9	14.2	Bexley Road – Campsie, Earlwood, Bexley	Eastbound exit and westbound entrance only; No access to Kingsgrove Road entrance/exit
Bayside	Kingsgrove–Earlwood boundary	22.9	14.2	Tunnel western terminus	
Bayside	Arncliffe	26.4	16.4	Princes Highway (A36) – Wolli Creek, Rockdale, Sutherland, Wollongong	Eastbound exit only
Bayside	Arncliffe	26.6	16.5	West Botany Street – Arncliffe	Westbound entrance from West Botany Street southbound only
Bayside	Arncliffe	26.8	16.7	Tunnel eastern terminus	
Bayside	Arncliffe	26.8	16.7	M5 East toll eastern end	
Bayside	Arncliffe	26.8	16.7	Marsh Street – Sydney International Airport, Mascot	Single-point urban interchange
Cooks River		27.8	17.3	Cooks River tunnel	
Bayside	Mascot	28.8	17.9	General Holmes Drive (M1 east) – Botany, Randwick, Sydney Domestic Airport, Sydney CBD	Eastern terminus of M5 East Motorway and route M5, continues east as route M1 along General Holmes Drive; No access to General Holmes Drive (south)
1.000 mi = 1.609 km; 1.000 km = 0.621 mi: Incomplete access; Tolled; Route transition

== See also ==
- Freeways in Australia
- Freeways in Sydney
