= Prestons, New South Wales =

Prestons
- Suburb
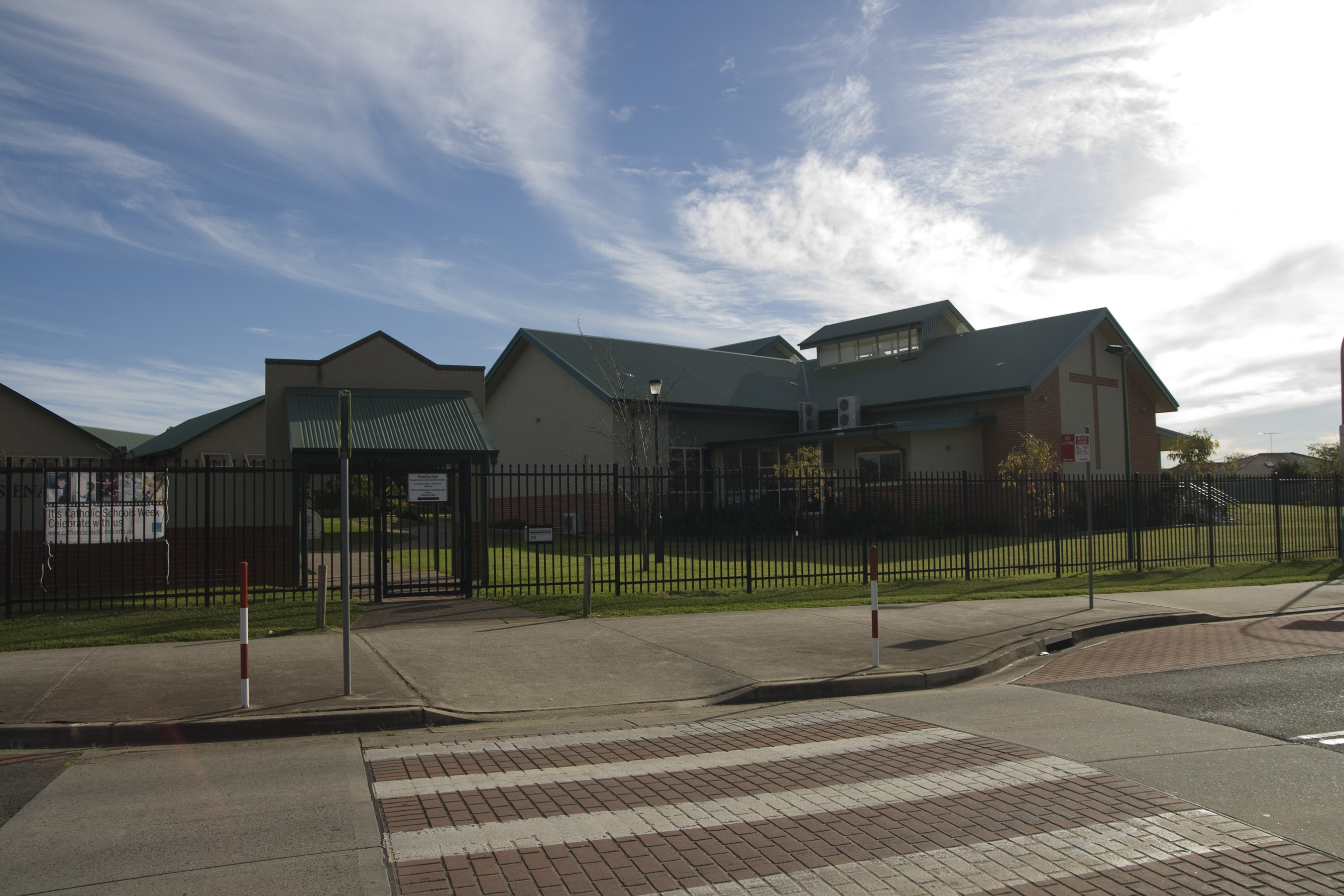
- Saint Catherine of Siena Catholic Primary School

- Interactive map of Prestons
- Country: Australia
- State: New South Wales
- City: Sydney
- LGA: City of Liverpool
- Location: 37 km (23 mi) south-west of Sydney CBD
- Established: 1972

Government
  - State electorates: Leppington; Holsworthy
  - Federal division: Werriwa

Population
  - Total: 15,694 (2021 census)
- Postcode: 2170
Suburbs around Prestons
Hinchinbrook	Miller	Cartwright
Hoxton Park	Prestons	Lurnea
Horningsea Park	Edmondson Park	Casula

Prestons is a suburb of Sydney, in the state of New South Wales, Australia 37 kilometres south-west of the Sydney central business district, in the local government area of the City of Liverpool.

== History ==
In the 1800s, this general area was known as "Cross Roads". The name appears to originate from 1821, when a notice published by John Oxley, the Surveyor General of New South Wales stated that "this Cross Road from Windsor ends in the new Bringelly Road". The name appears to have stuck, for as well as being a road to cross to the northern part of the Cumberland Basin, the Bringelly road literally made it a crossroad from east to west as well. The name was spelt as two words into the late 1800s, but the name continues in use today as the single word "Crossroads", being a locality within Casula, New South Wales and adjacent to modern Prestons, around the intersection of the Hume Highway/Campbelltown Road, and Camden Valley Way (formerly called Bringelly Road).

Prestons was named after a local Irish family with the surname of Preston who, in the early years of the 20th century, opened a small post office on the corner of Bringelly Road (now Camden Valley Way) and Ash Road. The family was well known for being friendly and helpful to the small community, donating food and household items to those in need. "Preston's Post Office" or "Preston's" (for short) became a landmark in the rural community, and the name "Prestons" came to be synonymous with the area it served.

After the Preston family ceased to run the post office, its operation passed to the May family, with a new post office building being constructed adjacent to their residence in Beech Road, now in modern Casula. However, from a 1934 newspaper report about the structure being damaged by a lightning-caused fire it can be seen that, despite having a new operator and location, the structure was referred to as the Prestons Post Office, showing that the original operator's name had become firmly associated with the locality at least four decades before being officially confirmed.

The name Prestons was officially gazetted as the name of the suburb on 7 April 1972.

== Schools ==
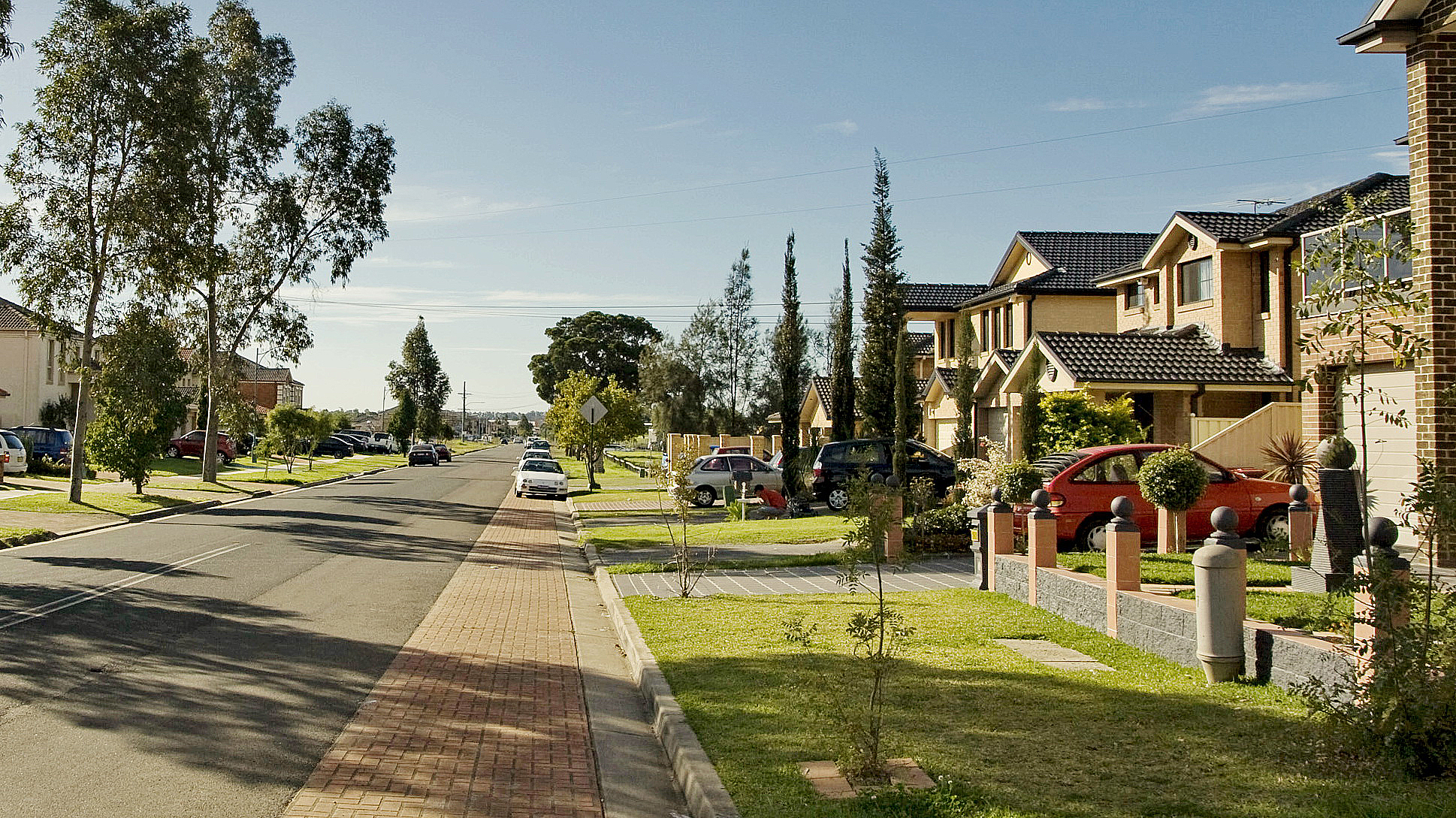
Ash Road

Schools in the suburb include Dalmeny and Prestons Public School. Private schools include, William Carey Christian School, Saint Catherine of Siena Catholic Primary School and the former Sule College, now known as Amity College.

== Transport ==
Prestons is situated at an important road junction (Sir Roden Cutler VC Memorial Interchange) where the M5 South Western Motorway from the city meets the Hume Motorway heading towards Canberra and Melbourne and the Westlink M7 heading towards Mount Druitt and northern Sydney. All three roads can be accessed from Camden Valley Way, which also connects Prestons to Liverpool and Camden. The M7 can also be accessed from Bernera Road. Prestons is serviced by trains to the city via Granville and the Airport from Glenfield and Edmondson Park stations. Transit Systems provides three bus services to Liverpool via different routes. One of these, route 850, also connects to Narellan.

== Sport ==
The Prestons Cricket Club (Hornets) operates from Amalfi Park, since it was founded in 1968. Prestons Robins Little Athletics operates every Wednesday and Friday nights at the new park on Ash Road during summer months.

== People ==
According to the 2021 census, Prestons had a population of 15,694 people. The most common countries of birth, other than Australia (52.9%), were Fiji (6.1%), Iraq (3.4%), India (3.2%), Philippines (3.0%) and Lebanon (2.0%). The most common foreign languages spoken at home were Arabic (10.6%), Hindi (6.7%), Turkish (3.3%), Urdu (3.1%) and Vietnamese (2.7%). While Catholicism was the most common religion (23.7%), Islam was the second most common with 21.7%, ahead of No Religion with 11.0%.

== Churches ==
- Lifegate Church, Prestons
- Freedom Centre International, Sydney
- Bible Baptist Church
- The Potter's House Christian Church, Liverpool
- Open Heaven Church
