= Arncliffe, New South Wales =

Arncliffe
- Suburb
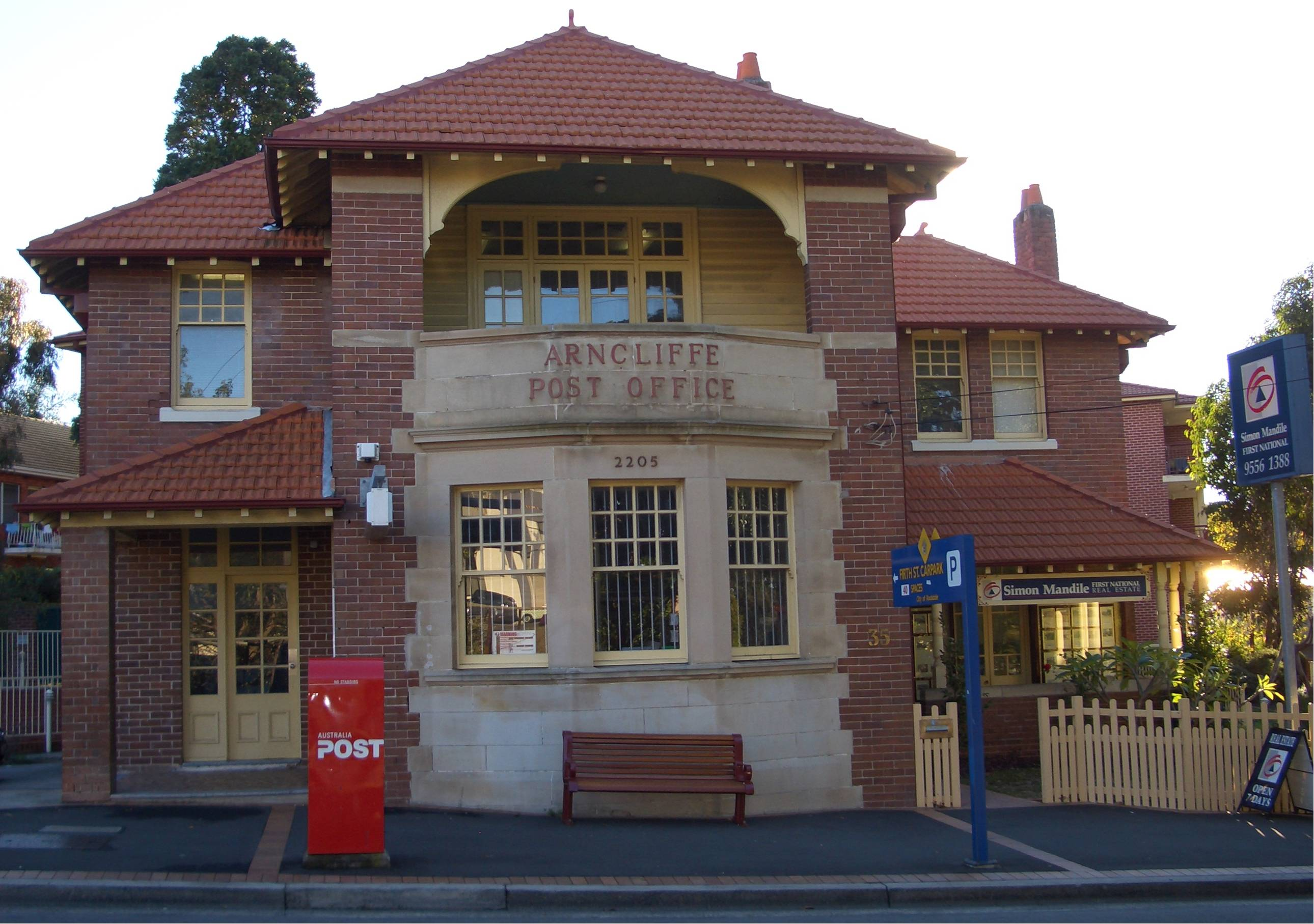
- Arncliffe Post Office

- Interactive map of Arncliffe
- Country: Australia
- State: New South Wales
- City: Sydney
- LGA: Bayside Council
- Location: 11 km (6.8 mi) south of Sydney CBD
- Established: 1840

Government
  - State electorate: Rockdale
  - Federal division: Barton

Area
  - Total: 3.6 km^{2} (1.4 sq mi)

Population
  - Total: 12,023 (2021 census)
  - Density: 3,340/km^{2} (8,650/sq mi)
- Postcode: 2205
Suburbs around Arncliffe
Bardwell Park	Turrella	Wolli Creek
Bardwell Valley	Arncliffe	Sydney Airport
Bexley	Banksia	Kyeemagh

Arncliffe is a suburb in southern Sydney, in the state of New South Wales, Australia. Arncliffe is located 11 kilometres south of the Sydney central business district, in the local government area of the Bayside Council.

Arncliffe is south of the Cooks River and Wolli Creek, close to Sydney Airport. Arncliffe is a mostly residential area featuring low-density detached and semi-detached houses and some medium density town houses and blocks of flats. There are also some areas of commercial and light industrial developments.

== History ==
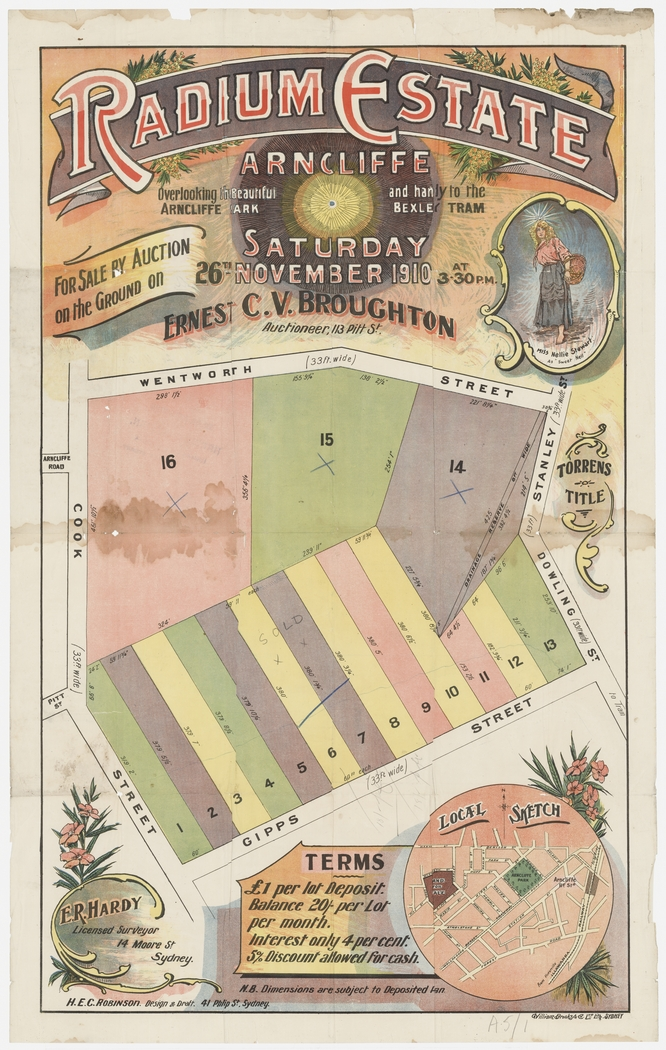
Radium Estate, Arncliffe 1910, Z/M3 811.1851/1910/1

Arncliffe's name comes from a small village called Arncliffe in North Yorkshire, England. The name appears in the Domesday Book of 1086, as 'Arneclif', meaning Eagle Cliff. In his book "A Village Called Arncliffe" (1997) Ron Rathbone relates that an early land speculator, William Hirst, created a subdivision in 1840 named The Village of Arncliffe Estate. William Hirst was born in Settle, Yorkshire. Settle is a market town serving a cluster of villages, of which Arncliffe is reputed to be the prettiest. Rathbone says it is likely that Hirst gave Arncliffe its name, although it was more than two decades before it received official recognition.

Alderman E.G. Barton worked to develop the district, including the reclamation 120 acres (0.49 km^{2}) of swampland where Barton Park and Kogarah Golf Links now stand. James Beehag also owned land in the area and later became one of Rockdale's early mayors. In November 1910, a series of lots were auctioned by Ernest V. Broughton. The area, bordered by Wentworth, Cook and Dowling streets was called the 'Radium Estate' and had been surveyed by E. R. Hardy.

=== Aboriginal culture ===
The original inhabitants of the area were tribes of Indigenous Australians. There is evidence to suggest that these people belonged to the Gweagal, Bidjigal and Cadigal clans. Valleys of local creeks, Wolli Creek and Bardwell Creek contain evidence of Aboriginal presence in smoke-blackened caves.

Originally, Arncliffe Hill was known as Cobbler's Hill and the area became the vegetable garden for Sydney. When Hannam's land was subdivided, many new small holdings became farms, spreading towards Black Creek or Muddy Creek. Allotments in the village of Arncliffe were between 10 and 20 acres (81,000 m^{2}). In 1843, newspaper advertisements declared that there was 'money to be made by woodcutters and farming men and persons about Cook's River'. In 1856 another subdivision, Tempe, was described as being close to the village of Arncliffe, described as having "all the characteristics of an English village, being beautifully situated amidst quiet rural scenery, spotted here and there with neat cottages which charm the eye with their pretty, well trimmed gardens, perfect pictures of competence and content".

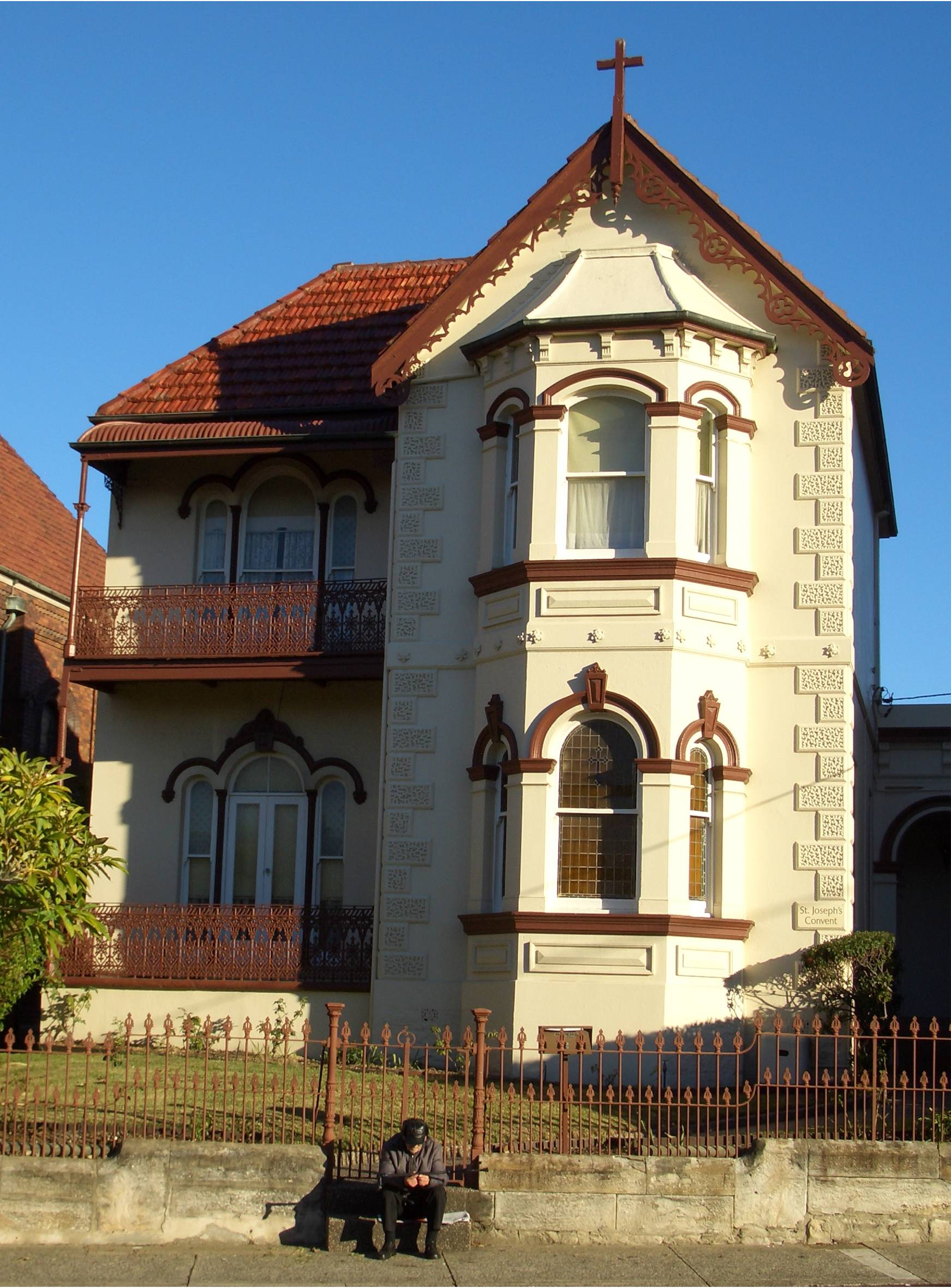
former St Francis Xavier presbytery

Athelstane, owned by W.G. Judd, was a notable home in the district. The large house gave its name to the avenue it was built on and later became the site of Athelstane Public School. Another main street, Barden Street, was named after Frederick Barden whose house, Highbery Heights, stood nearby. Arncliffe had many grand and gracious Victorian era houses. Too many have been demolished, or fallen into disrepair, been subdivided and so on, but in the most recent years there have been some attempts to preserve these as part of local heritage. Two-storey semi-detached dwellings, Gladstone and Wentworth on Forest Road, were built by Hurstville builder Robert Newell for rental to 'well to do' tenants. Dappeto on Wollongong Road built in 1885 by oyster merchant Frederick Gibbins, later became a home for children and now houses a Salvation Army chapel, as part of a nursing home and retirement village. 'Belmont' and 'Fairview' are identical Victorian homes built in 1884 by two Irish brothers Thomas and Alexander Milsop, who made their fortunes in the goldfields. 'Meryton' was erected by building contractor Alexander Fell in 1885. 'Coburra' was built in 1905 but was more typical of the earlier Victorian era. Arncliffe Post office is a Federation style building opened in 1906 and originally contained the post master's residence upstairs.

The avenue of trees was planted around 1904. Over the years, Arncliffe has hosted a stinking boiling down works (1870s), a sewerage farm (1886–1916) and various factories and workshops throughout the 20th century, particularly after WW2. These included the Streets Ice Cream factory and Fontana Films, where the film "Jedda" was produced with many of the scenes shot in Arncliffe. Both Streets and Fontana have now closed.

== Heritage listings ==
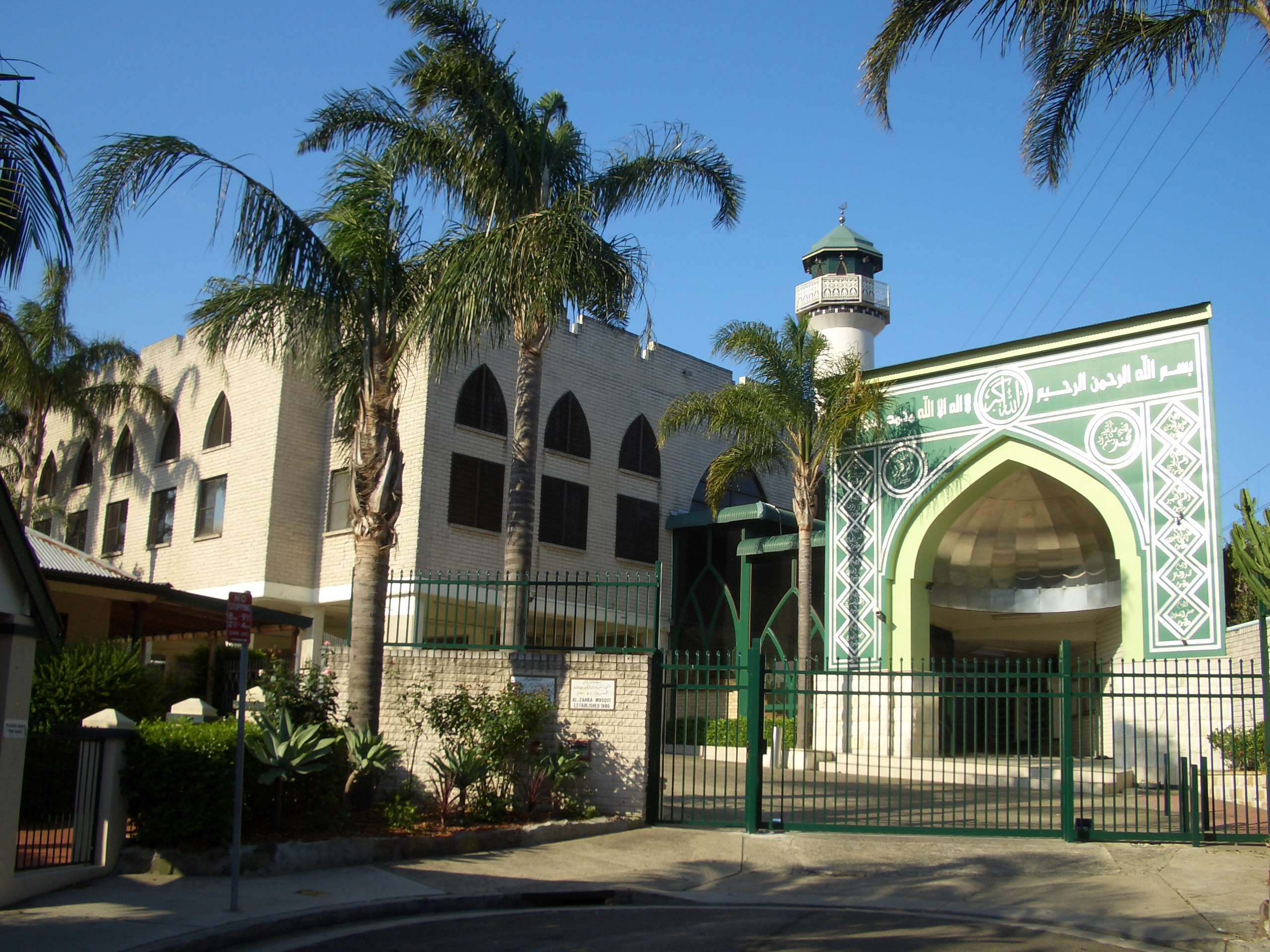
Al-Zahra Mosque

Arncliffe has a number of heritage-listed sites, including:

- Firth Street: Arncliffe railway station
- 1 Princes Highway (now in Wolli Creek): Tempe House and St Magdalenes Chapel
- Valda Avenue (off south side of Kogarah Golf Course): Western Outfall Main Sewer
- 171 Wollongong Road: Dappeto

== Commercial area ==
Arncliffe's main shopping centre is centred around Firth Street and Belmore Street, beside Arncliffe railway station. It also extends part of the way along Forest Road. Shops are also scattered along the length of Wollongong Road towards Bexley. Commercial and light industrial developments are located in the northern parts of the suburb and along the length of the Princes Highway and surrounding streets.

== Transport ==
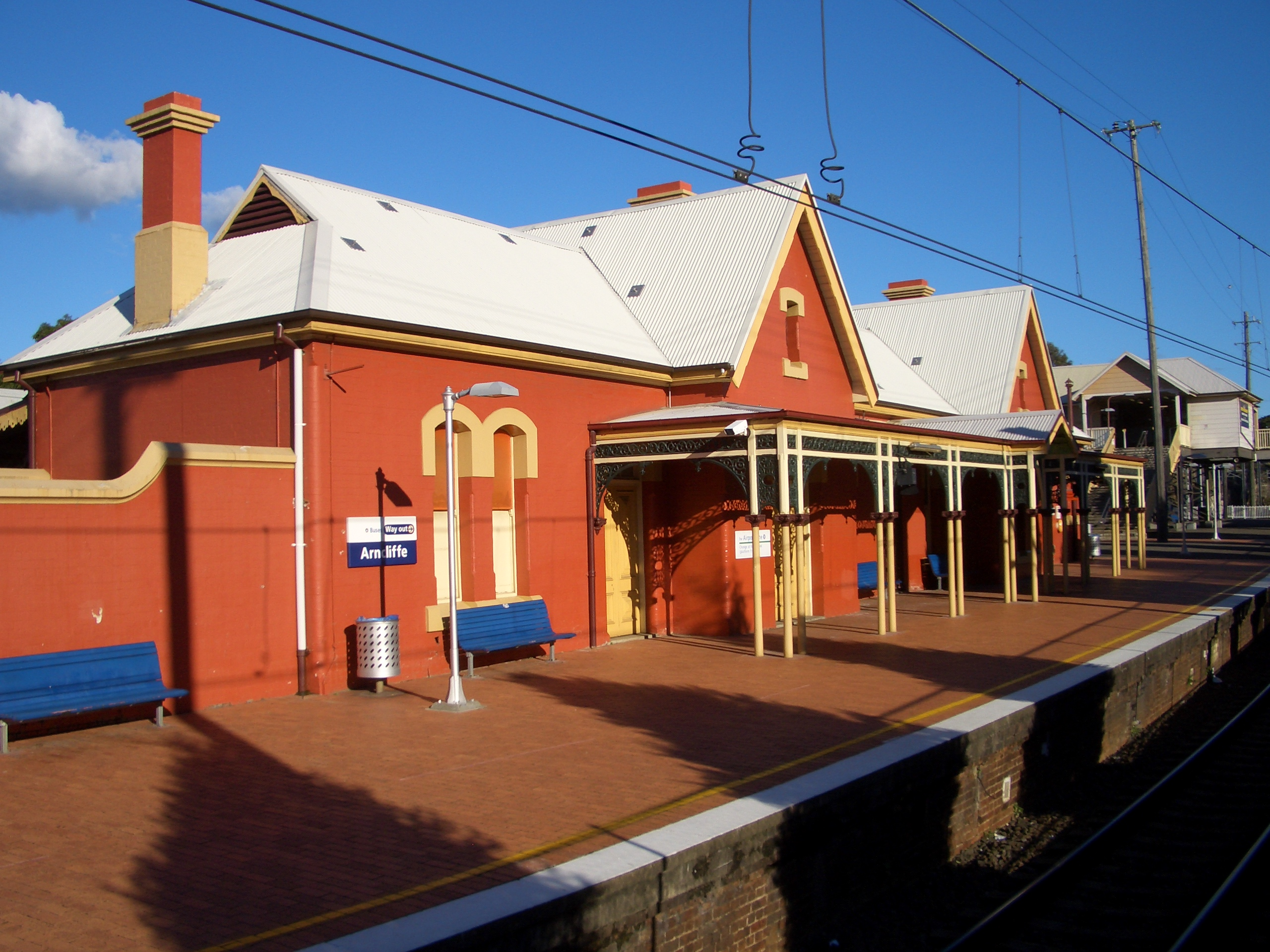
Arncliffe railway station

The Princes Highway runs north towards the city and south towards Rockdale and Kogarah. The other main roads through the suburb are Forest Road and Wollongong Road which run south towards Hurstville. The M5 Motorway runs south-west towards Beverly Hills, Liverpool and north-east towards Botany and the city. A 4 km tunnel runs partly underneath Arncliffe with entrances and exits on Princes Highway and Marsh Street, near the airport.

Arncliffe railway station is on the Illawarra railway line.

Arncliffe is also serviced by bus routes 473, 420 and 420N operated by Transit Systems. Route 473 runs from Rockdale, Bardwell Valley, Arncliffe, Turrella station, Earlwood, Clemton Park, and on to Campsie. Route 420 runs from Mascot to the Sydney Airport terminals, through Arncliffe to Rockdale and on to Westfield Burwood. Route 420N is a night version of route 420.

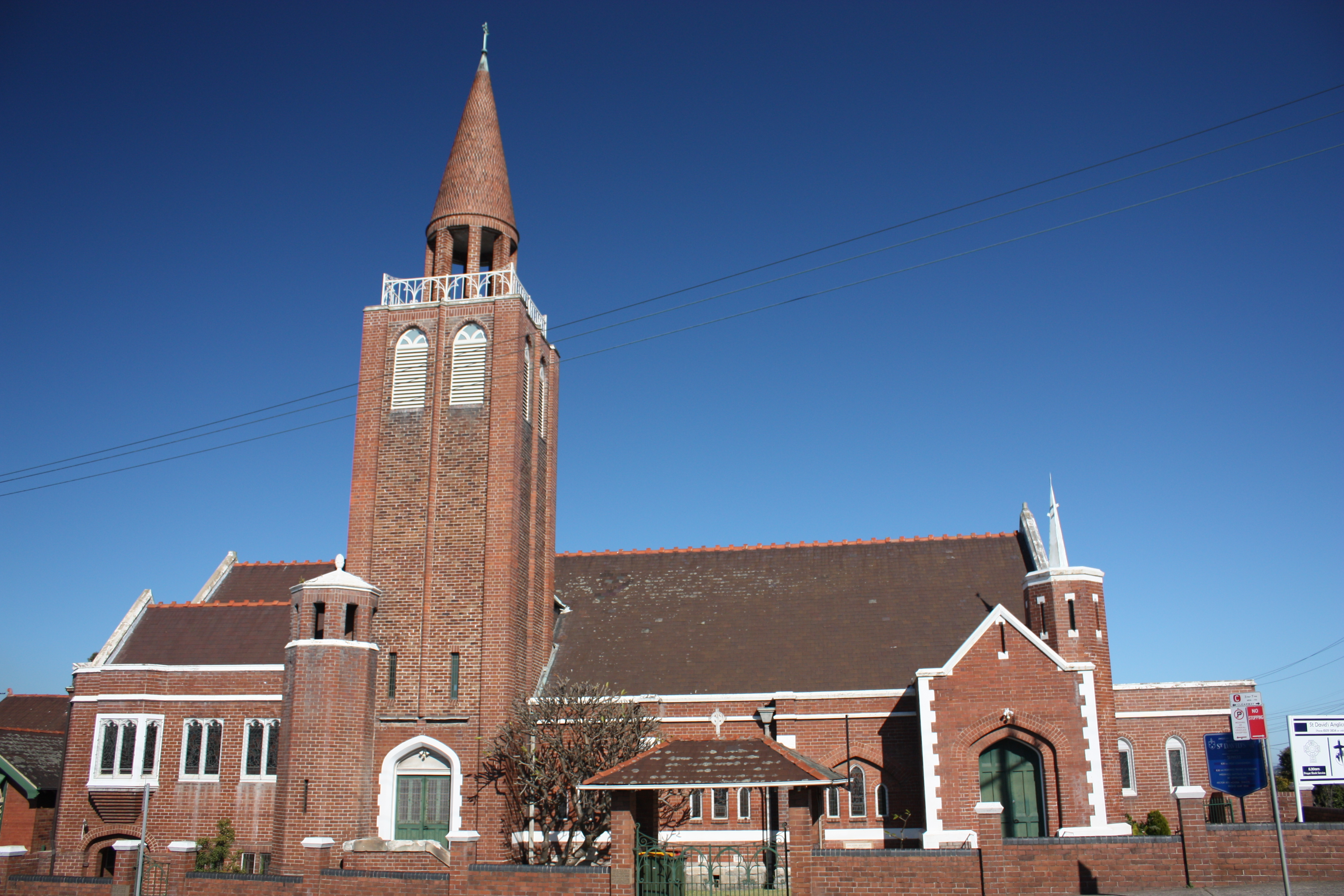
St David's Anglican Church

== Religion ==
- St David's Anglican Church on Forest Road.
- St Francis Xavier's Catholic Church on Forest Road.
- Saint Marks Coptic Orthodox Cathedral on Wollongong Road.
- Al-Zahra Mosque at the end of Wollongong Road.
- Masjid Darul Imaan Mosque on Eden Street.
- Bay City Church on Hattersley Street.

== Schools ==
- Arncliffe Public School is located on the corner of Avenal Street and the Princes Highway. Arncliffe Domestic Science Secondary School was formerly located behind the Primary School, on the corner of Avenal Street and Segenhoe Street.
- Athelstane Public School is located on the corner of Wollongong Road and Athelstane Avenue.
- Arncliffe West Infants School on Loftus Street is technically located in the suburb of Turrella.
- St Francis Xavier's Catholic School sits beside the church on Forest Road.
- Al-Zahra College is next to the mosque on Wollongong Road.
- Kingdom Culture Christian School sits on the corner of Dowling street.

== Parks ==
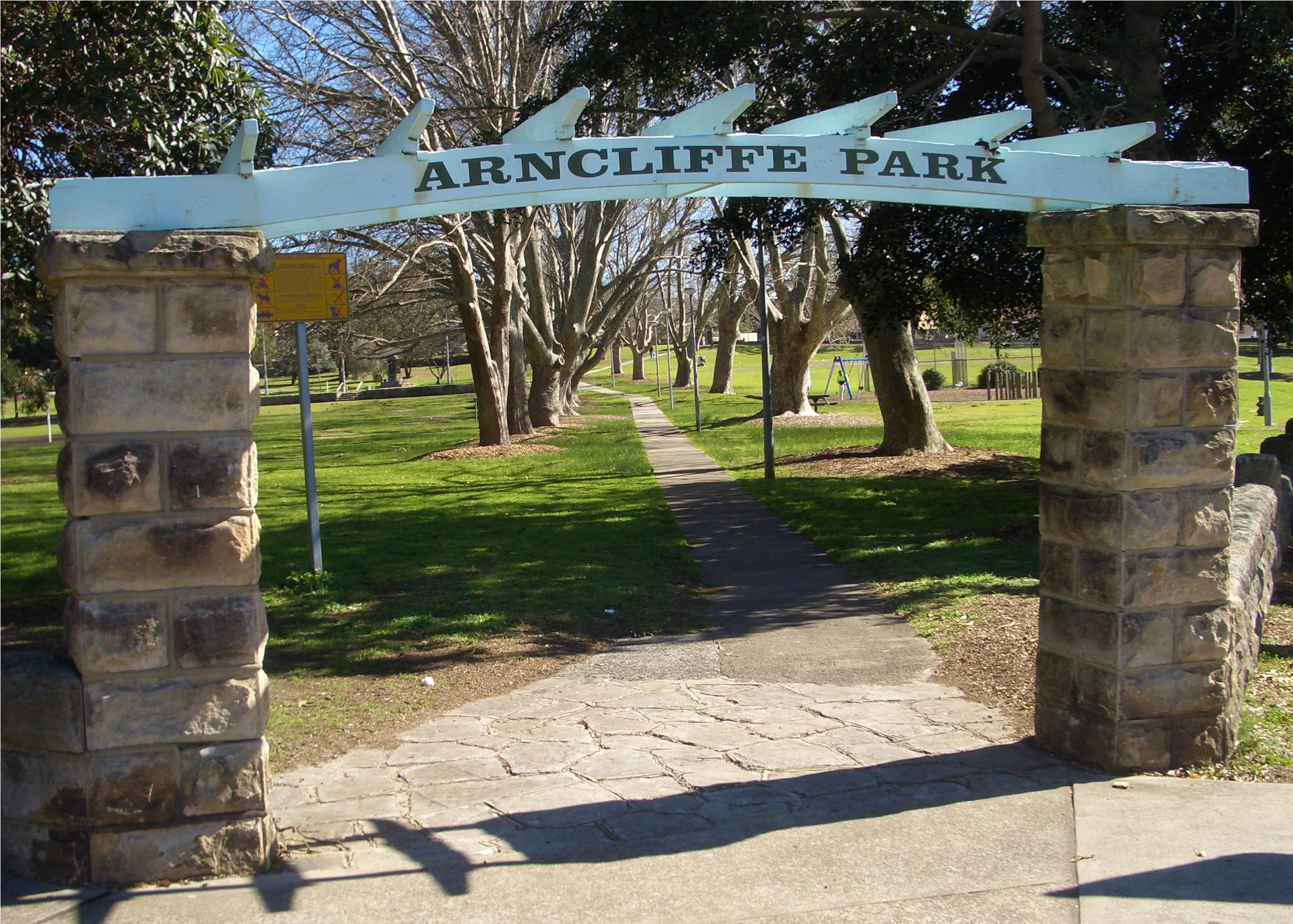
Arncliffe Park

Arncliffe Park is the home ground for local teams playing Cricket, Rugby league and Soccer. Cahill Park and Barton Park also provide a number of recreational facilities. Arncliffe War Memorial is located in the middle of Arncliffe Park. Other Parks and recreational facilities include Cahill Park, Barton Park, Kogarah Golf Course.

Arncliffe's Earl Park was the home ground of New South Wales Rugby Football League Premiership club, St. George from 1925 to 1939, and was the site of the infamous 1928 Earl Park riot.

== Culture ==
Arncliffe has a number of social venues including:

- Arncliffe RSL
- Arncliffe Scots Sports & Social Club
- Rowers on Cooks River, formerly the St George Rowing Club
- Kogarah Golf Club

== Demographics ==
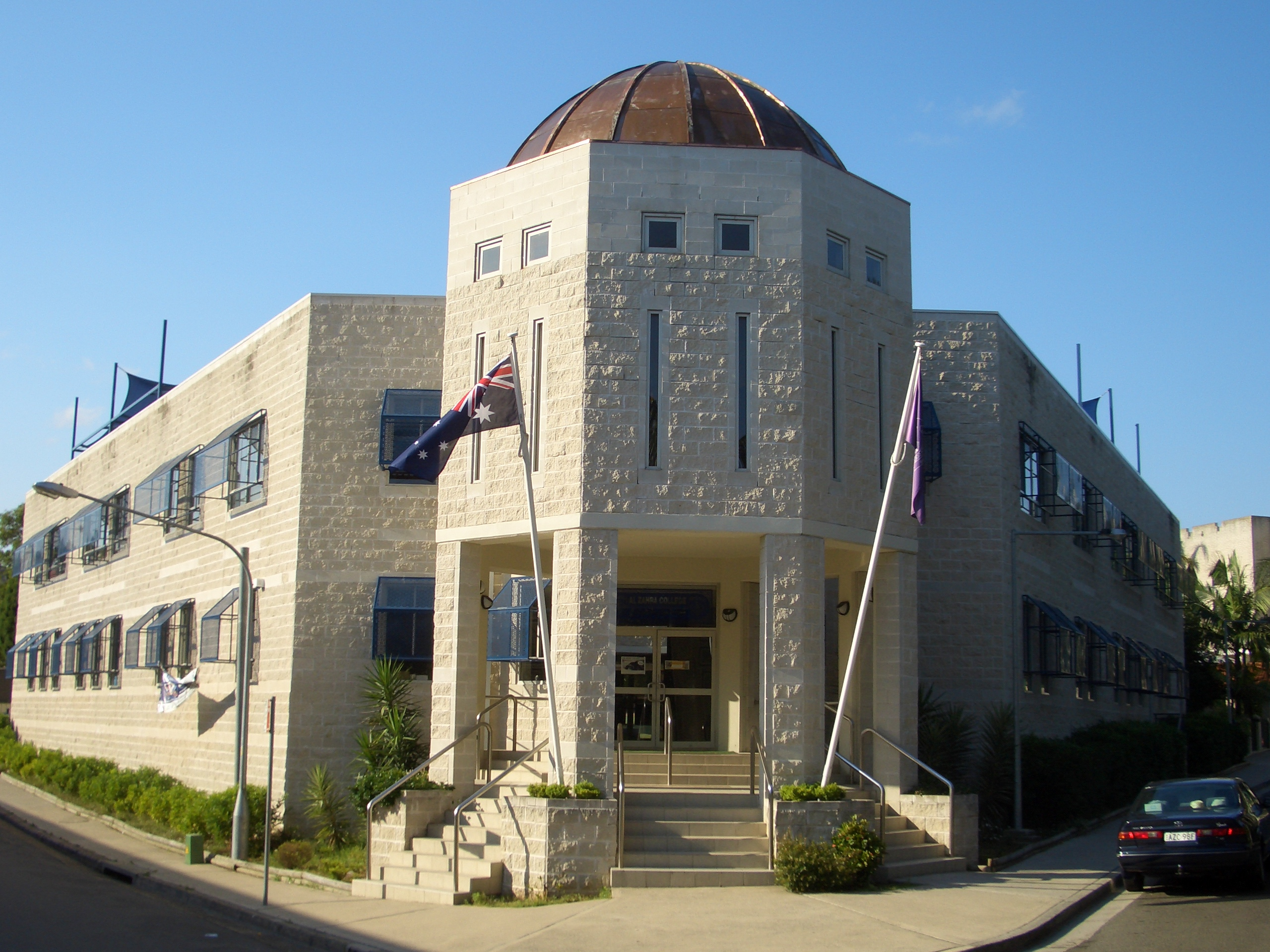
Al-Zahra College

At the 2021 census, the population of Arncliffe was 12,023; 51.2% were male and 48.8% were female.

Country of Birth: 44.8% of people were born in Australia. The next most common countries of birth were China 5.9%, Lebanon 5.7%, Mongolia 3.0%, North Macedonia 2.9% and Philippines 2.1%.

Languages: 35.8% of people only spoke English at home. Other languages spoken at home included Arabic 14.6%, Mandarin 6.3%, Macedonian 4.3%, Spanish 3.3% and Mongolian 3.0%.

Religion: The most common responses for religion were No Religion 28.1%, Islam 19.4% and Catholic 16.7%.

At the 2016 census, the population of Arncliffe was 10,590.

== Geography ==
=== Wolli Creek and Bardwell Valley ===
An important community issue is potential overdevelopment, with high-density housing development occurring around the new Wolli Creek railway station. This area in the northern part of Arncliffe officially became the separate suburb of Wolli Creek in 2002.

Bardwell Valley was originally a locality beside Bardwell Creek, adjoining the suburb of Bardwell Park. The valley was famous for its golf course and golf club. Bardwell Valley became a new suburb in 1996, formed from parts of Arncliffe that border the valley.

=== Landmarks ===
- Arncliffe Railway Station on Firth Street
- Arncliffe Fire Station on West Botany Street
- Arncliffe Library on Firth Street
- Arncliffe Community Centre, Arncliffe YMCA and Coronation Hall on Barden Street
- St George School Education Area Office on Segenhoe Street, beside Arncliffe Public School
