= William Carey Christian School =

Location
- Prestons, South-western Sydney, New South Wales; Australia; 33°56′52″S 150°51′04″E

Information
- Type: Independent co-educational early learning, primary and secondary day school
- Motto: Expect Great things from God, Attempt Great things for God
- Denomination: Non-denominational Christian
- Established: 9 February 1984; 42 years ago
- Educational authority: NSW Department of Education
- Principal: Keith McMullen
- Years: Early learning and K–12
- Enrolment: 1,235 (2015)
- Area: 11 hectares (26 acres)
- Campus type: Suburban
- Colours: Blue and maroon
- Website: www.wccs.nsw.edu.au

William Carey Christian School is an independent non-denominational Christian co-educational early learning, primary and secondary day school, located in Prestons, a suburb in South Western Sydney, New South Wales, Australia.

The school provides a religious and general education to approximately 1,250 students, from early learning; through Kindergarten to Year 12.

== Overview ==
William Carey was established on 9 February 1984 with a total enrolment of four students. At the time, it was located in a small Reformed church building at the end of McClean Street, Liverpool. It remained in this place before moving to St. Stephen's Anglican Church on Cabramatta Road, Cabramatta, and then later to a Uniting Church on Sutton Road, Ashcroft.

In 1988, the School moved to its current grounds in Prestons. The initially purchased land was half of what it is now, and was bordered by Cabramatta Creek (as it is now), semi-rural farming land (where the housing estate is now) and chicken farms (where its sports fields and Preporatory School are now located).

On its initial move, the School allocated up to Junior High grades, expanding over the course of the following years to incorporate Senior High Grades. The initial buildings of the school were those located closest to Cabramatta Creek, the land ending where the centre driveway now divides the school into two sections. Early in 1990, the school purchased the land where the chicken farms were located, adding sports fields and more class rooms to accommodate its continued growth.

A preparatory school adjoining the school grounds opened at the beginning of 2010. The school is very large, and has a primary section and a high-school section. The school also offers Before and After School Care and Vacation Care from the same facility. Infants, primary and high school departments are all on the eleven-hectare (26-acre) site.

WCCS has an open enrolment policy and no religious test is required of parents who wish to enrol their children at the school, however, the parent body is aware of the school's distinctive Christian emphasis and are expected to support and co-operate with it. The Board appoints teachers and other staff, as well as the principal, who is then responsible for the day-to-day running of the school.

== See also ==
- List of non-government schools in New South Wales
