= Dappeto =

Heritage-listed residence in New South Wales, Australia

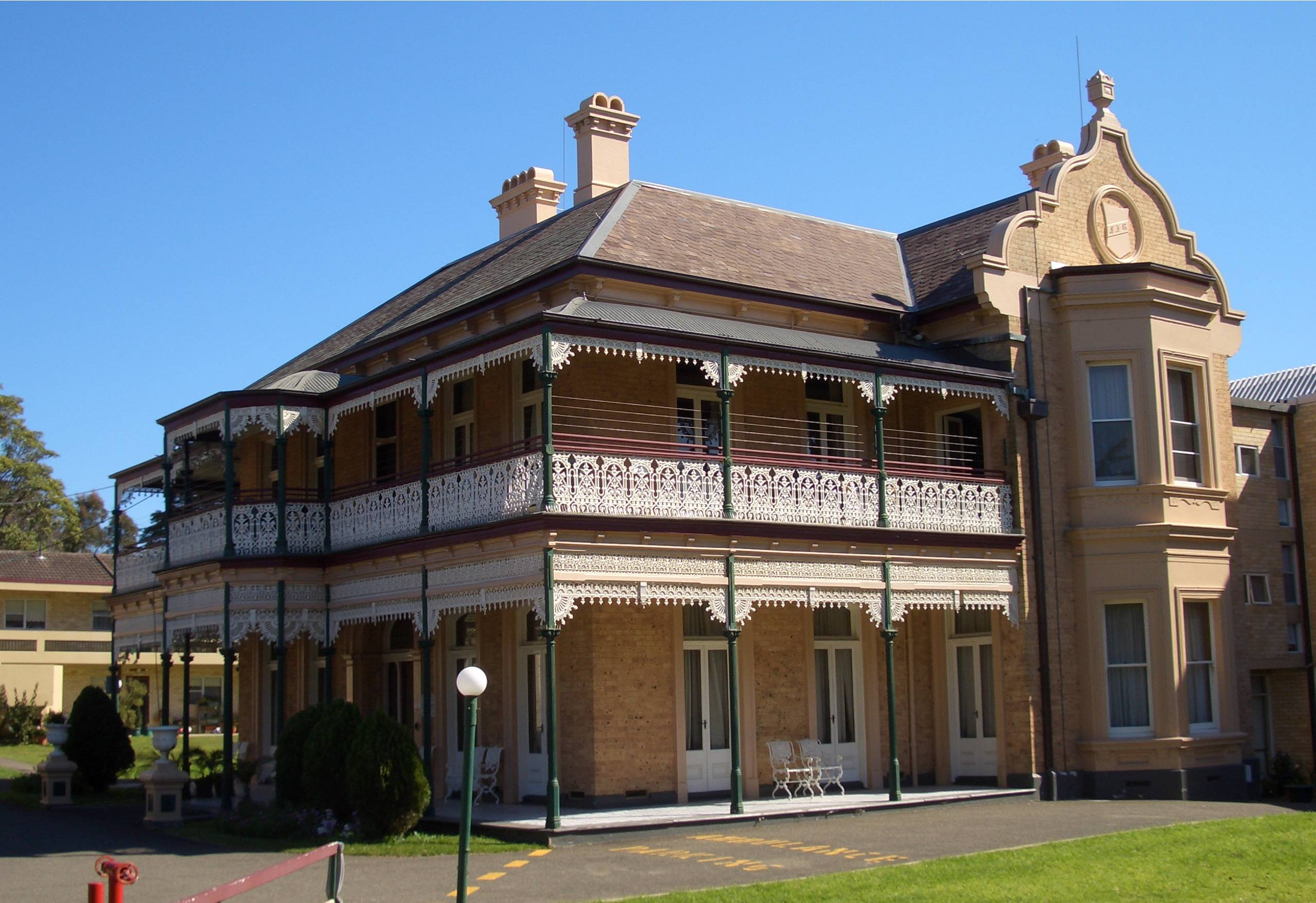
- Dappeto, 2006

- Location within Sydney Location within Australia
- 33°56′23″S 151°08′06″E
- Location: 171 Wollongong Road, Arncliffe, New South Wales, Australia

History
- Built: 1885

Site notes
- Architectural style: Victorian Filigree
- Owner: The Salvation Army

New South Wales Heritage Register
- Official name: Dappeto; Macquarie Lodge; Dapetto
- Type: State heritage (built)
- Designated: 2 April 1999
- Reference no.: 638
- Type: House
- Category: Residential buildings (private)
- Builders: Frederick Gibbins

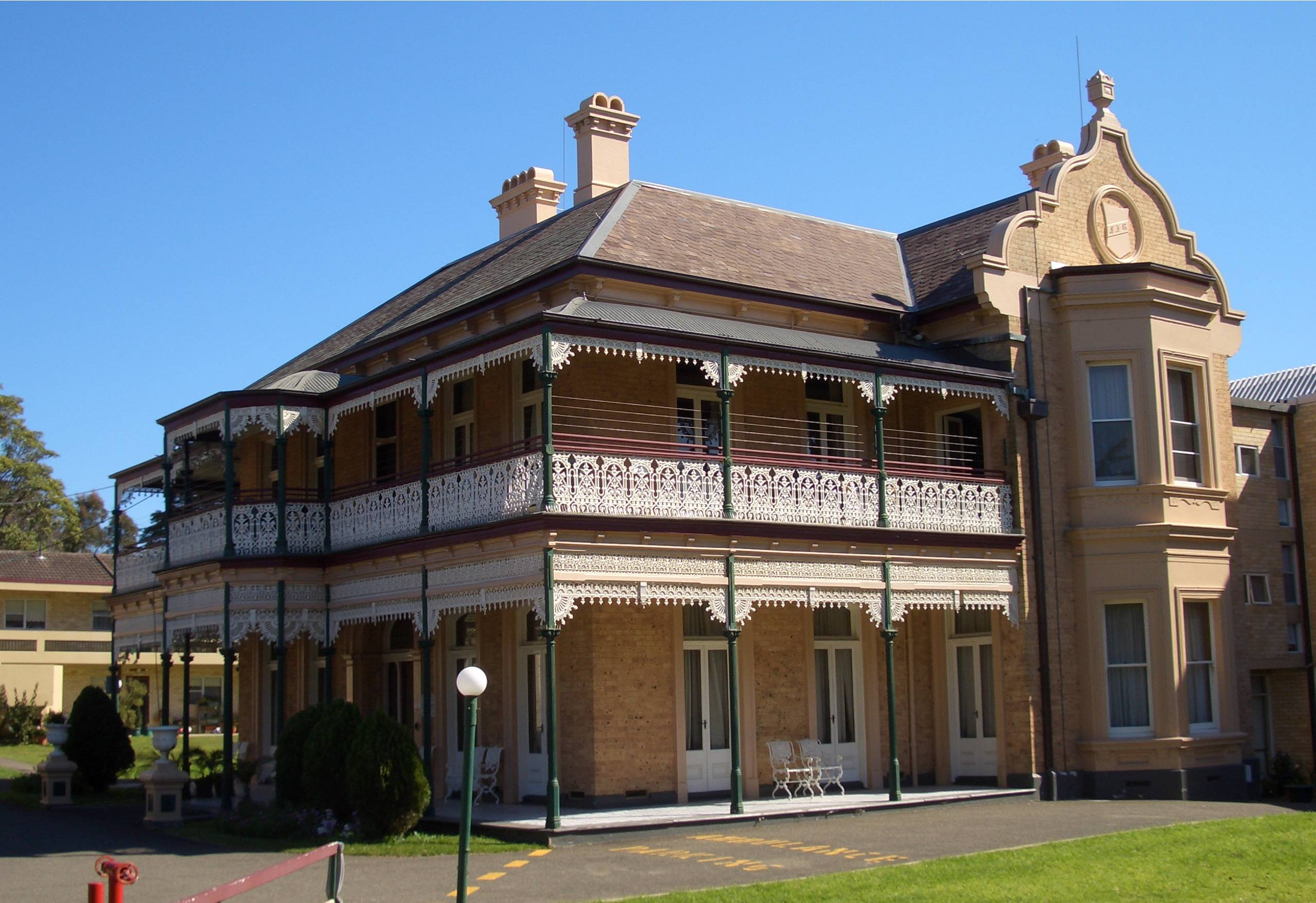
Dappeto, Wollongong Road, Arncliffe

Dappeto is a heritage-listed residence at 171 Wollongong Road, Arncliffe, New South Wales, Australia. It was built in 1885 by Frederick Gibbins. It is also known as Macquarie Lodge and Dapetto. The property is owned by the Salvation Army. It was added to the New South Wales State Heritage Register on 2 April 1999.

== History ==
Frederick John Gibbins (builder and owner of Dappeto 1885 to 1917) was born on 25 May 1841 at Dappeto - an Aboriginal name for the area south of Wollongong, later variously known as Dapto or Mullet Creek.

Frederick Gibbins was the eldest child of John and Ann Gibbins (née Meredith) who were married at St. Luke's Anglican Church, Liverpool, NSW on 16 March 1840. John Gibbins arrived in Australia on the "Claudine" in 1829 after having been sentenced to 14 years transportation for stealing a handkerchief. Frederick John's mother, Ann, was a granddaughter of First Fleeter Meredith, Steward to Captain John Marshall of the "Scarborough."

In 1865 Frederick John Gibbins met and married Catherine Pickett and they had a family of six sons and three daughters - Alfred, Emma (Pattison), Amy (Thom), Ernest, Frederick, Walter, Edwin, Ada (Stead) and Percy. Percy died at the old family home in Kent Street, Sydney, in early 1885 just prior to the move to Dappeto.

From 1885 to 1917 Dappeto was the home of the Gibbins family. The home stood on 11 acres of land, part portion 61, Parish of St. George one of four adjoining portions included in a Crown Grant made to Thomas Hill Bardwell on 5 September 1853. On 18 September 1879, Portion 61 was sold to George Penkivil Salde who in turn sold the land to Frederick John Gibbins on 6 August 1881.

In 1885 the building of Dappeto was completed and became the family home of the Gibbins family until the death of Mr Gibbins in 1917 and the final sale and settlement of the estate.

Frederick Gibbins was an oyster merchant and trawling magnate. About 1906 he entered into partnership with three other large oyster merchants, Comino Athanassio, Charles Edward Woodward and John Moriarty, and the firm, known as Woodward, Gibbons & Comino, dominated oyster marketing in New South Wales.

In 1917 the Salvation Army purchased Dappeto and part of the original site - Lots 33 to 36 and 54-59 Section B, Portion 61 for the purpose of establishing a Children's Home. It remained in operation as such until 1969 when the children in residence were transferred to the Stanmore Children's Home and plans for a Senior Citizens' Complex were prepared.

In 1971 the Senior Citizen's Complex was completed containing self-contained units, a bed hostel and nursing home. The complex was renamed Macquarie Lodge. The wing at the rear of Dapetto that housed the kitchen, laundry and servants' accommodation was demolished and replaced with the present nursing home.

Following its nomination by Rockdale Council an Interim Heritage Order was placed over Dappeto on 14 May 1986. A Permanent Conservation Order was placed over the property on 17 February 1989 and transferred to the State Heritage Register on 2 April 1999.

== Description ==
Dappeto is a two-storey house of domestic style Victorian architecture. It was constructed of sand-stock face bricks which were mixed with whale oil to protect the building against dampness. It has a patterned slate roof surmounted by an ornate captain's walk accessed by a cast iron spiral staircase. The two storey verandah has an iron balustrade and trim to the upper floor and frieze to the lower floor. It features several beautiful fireplaces and overmantles of various imported English timbers.

The name Dapetto appears above the fanlight. A Coat of Arms with initials F. J. G. is above the side bay windows.

== Heritage listing ==
Dappeto is of State heritage significance as an excellent example of domestic style Victorian architecture. It is associated with Frederick Gibbins, an oyster merchant and trawling magnate.

Dappeto was listed on the New South Wales State Heritage Register on 2 April 1999.
