= Central railway station, Sydney =

Central
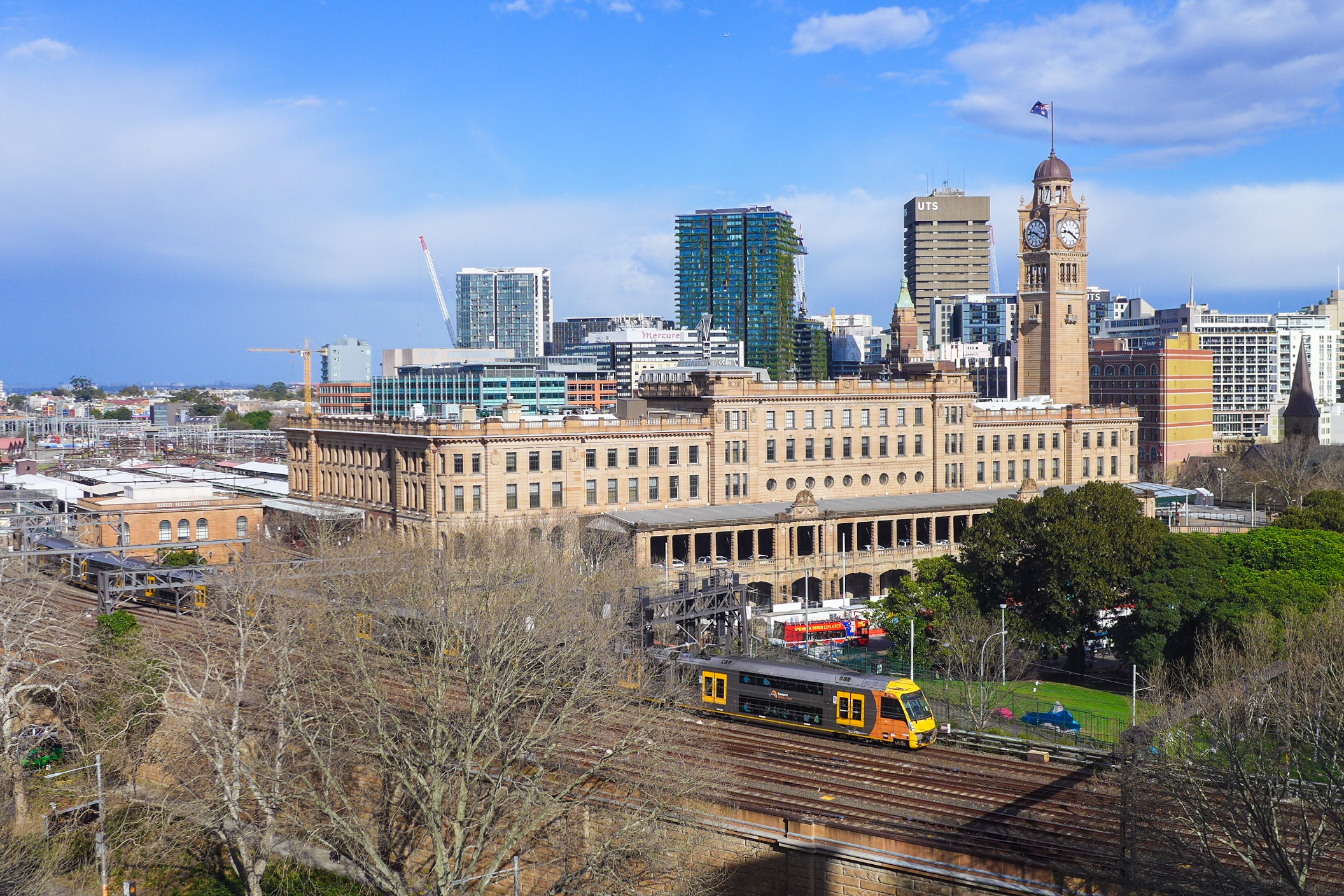
- Central railway station, August 2017

General information
- Location: Eddy Avenue, Sydney, New South Wales; Australia
- Coordinates: 33.8849°S 151.2052°E
- Elevation: 20 metres (66 ft)
- Owner: Transport Asset Manager of New South Wales
- Platforms: 26: 14 terminating; 12 through/island platforms; 4 underground
- Tracks: 30
- Train operators: Sydney Trains; Metro Trains Sydney; NSW TrainLink; Journey Beyond
- Connections: 12 bus stands; 13 coach bays; Central Grand Concourse; Central Chalmers Street

Construction
- Structure type: Ground & underground
- Accessible: Yes

Other information
- Status: Staffed (24 hours, 7 days per week)
- Station code: CEN
- Website: Central station at transportnsw.info

History
- Opened: 5 August 1906; 120 years ago
- Electrified: June 1926

Passengers
- 2025: 50,334,165 (year); 810,143 (NSW TrainLink Regional) (2023); 137,902 (daily)
- Rank: 1
Services
Preceding station	Sydney Trains	Following station
Redfern towards Emu Plains or Richmond	T1 North Shore & Western Line	Town Hall towards Berowra
Redfern towards Parramatta or Leppington	T2 Leppington & Inner West Line	Town Hall towards City Circle
Redfern towards Parramatta or Leppington	T2 Leppington & Inner West Line	Museum (limited anti-clockwise service) One-way operation
Redfern towards Liverpool	T3 Liverpool & Inner West Line	Town Hall towards City Circle
Redfern towards Liverpool	T3 Liverpool & Inner West Line	Museum (limited anti-clockwise service) One-way operation
Redfern towards Waterfall or Cronulla	T4 Eastern Suburbs & Illawarra Line	Town Hall towards Bondi Junction
Redfern towards Olympic Park	T7 Olympic Park Line (special events only)	Terminus
Redfern Via Sydenham towards Macarthur	T8 Airport & South Line	Museum towards City Circle
Green Square Via Sydney Airport towards Macarthur	T8 Airport & South Line	Museum towards City Circle
Redfern towards Hornsby	T9 Northern Line	Town Hall towards Gordon
Preceding station	Sydney Metro	Following station
Gadigal towards Tallawong	M1 Metro North West & Bankstown Line	Waterloo towards Bankstown
Preceding station	Intercity Trains	Following station
Redfern towards Katoomba or Mount Victoria	Blue Mountains Line (weekday peak only)	Terminus
Strathfield towards Lithgow	Blue Mountains Line	Terminus
Parramatta towards Bathurst	Blue Mountains Line (twice daily) Bathurst Bullet	Terminus
Redfern towards Newcastle Interchange	Central Coast & Newcastle Line (weekday peak only)	Terminus
Strathfield towards Newcastle Interchange	Central Coast & Newcastle Line	Terminus
Town Hall towards Gosford or Wyong	Central Coast & Newcastle Line (peak hour services via Gordon)	Terminus
Redfern towards Kiama	South Coast Line	Terminus
Redfern towards Kiama	South Coast Line (morning and evening services)	Town Hall towards Bondi Junction
Glenfield towards Moss Vale or Goulburn	Southern Highlands Line (evening services)	Terminus
Preceding station	NSW TrainLink	Following station
Strathfield towards Grafton, Casino or Brisbane	NSW TrainLink North Coast Line	Terminus
Strathfield towards Moree or Armidale	NSW TrainLink North Western Line	Terminus
Strathfield towards Broken Hill or Dubbo	NSW TrainLink Western Line	Terminus
Campbelltown towards Canberra, Griffith or Melbourne	NSW TrainLink Southern Line	Terminus
Preceding station	Journey Beyond	Following station
Mount Victoria One-way operation	Indian Pacific	Terminus
Broken Hill towards Perth	Indian Pacific	Terminus
Excursion runs
Preceding station	East Coast Heritage Rail	Following station
Wolli Creek towards Moss Vale	The Cockatoo Run	Terminus
- Building details

General information
- Type: Railway station terminus
- Architectural style: Federation Free Classical
- Inaugurated: 4 August 1906
- Renovated: 1915, 1921, 1926, 1955, 1964, 1979, 2024
- Cost: £561,000, equivalent to approximately A$94,600,000 in 2022
- Client: New South Wales Government Railways

Height
- Height: 75 m (246 ft)
- Tip: 85.6 metres (281 ft) AHD

Technical details
- Material: Sydney sandstone; Carrara marble and terrazzo; Australian red cedar joinery; Acid etched glazing; metalwork balustrades
- Lifts/elevators: 17

Design and construction
- Architect: Walter Liberty Vernon (1901–1906)
- Architecture firm: New South Wales Government Architect
- Developer: Government of New South Wales
- Engineer: Henry Deane (Engineer in Chief of the New South Wales Government Railways)
- Services engineer: John Bradfield (rail engineering)
- Other designers: Fairfax & Roberts (clock tower)
- Main contractor: NSW Department of Public Works

New South Wales Heritage Register
- Official name: Sydney Terminal and Central Railway Stations Group; Central Railway; Central Station; Underbridges
- Type: State heritage (complex / group)
- Criteria: a., b., c., d., e., f., g.
- Designated: 2 April 1999
- Reference no.: 1255
- Type: Railway Platform / Station
- Category: Transport – Rail

References
Location

Central is a heritage-listed railway station located in the centre of Sydney, New South Wales, Australia. The station is Australia's largest and busiest railway station, and is a major transport interchange for NSW TrainLink inter-city rail services, Sydney Trains commuter rail services, Sydney Metro services, Sydney Light Rail services, bus services, and private coach transport services. The station is also known as Sydney Terminal (Platforms 1 to 12). The property was added to the New South Wales State Heritage Register on 2 April 1999. It recorded 85.4 million passenger movements in 2018 and serves over 250,000 people daily.

Central station occupies a large city block separating Haymarket, Surry Hills and the central business district, bounded by Railway Square and Pitt Street in the west, Eddy Avenue in the north, Elizabeth Street in the east and the Devonshire Street Tunnel in the south. Parts of the station and marshalling yards extend as far south as Cleveland Street, and are located on the site of the former Devonshire Street Cemetery.

== History ==
There have been three terminal stations in Sydney.

=== First Sydney terminal ===
The railway arrived in New South Wales in 1831. Proposals began in the 1840s for a railway linking Sydney and Parramatta, with an eastern terminus close to the Sydney city centre.

Although the Sydney Railway Company first applied to the government for four blocks of land between Hay and Cleveland streets in 1849, the Surveyor General favoured Grose Farm, now the grounds of the University of Sydney. It was further from the city and less costly to develop. The company finally exchanged land in the first, second and third blocks, between Hay and Devonshire Streets, for an increased area of eight hectares (twenty acres) in the fourth block, the Government Paddocks, between Devonshire and Cleveland Streets. Hence, the site of the first Sydney railway terminus was located here from 1855.

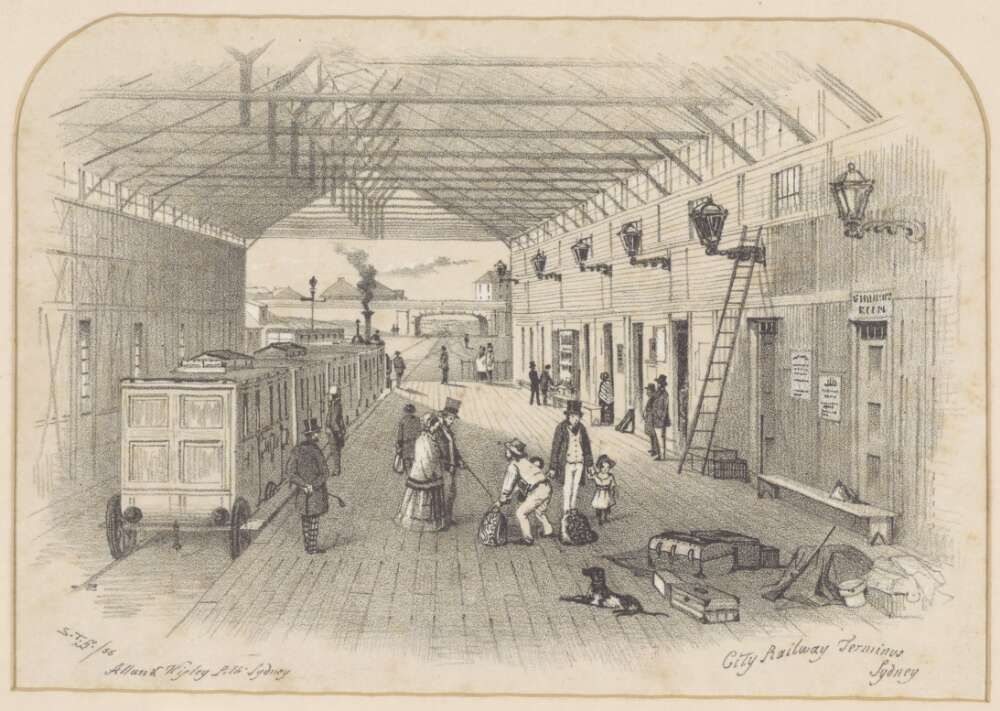
City railway terminus, Sydney (1856) – Samuel Thomas Gill

The original Sydney station was opened on 26 September 1855 in an area known as Cleveland Fields. It was a temporary timber and corrugated iron building, constructed rapidly in late August to early September 1855, in time for the opening of the line to Parramatta for passenger trains.

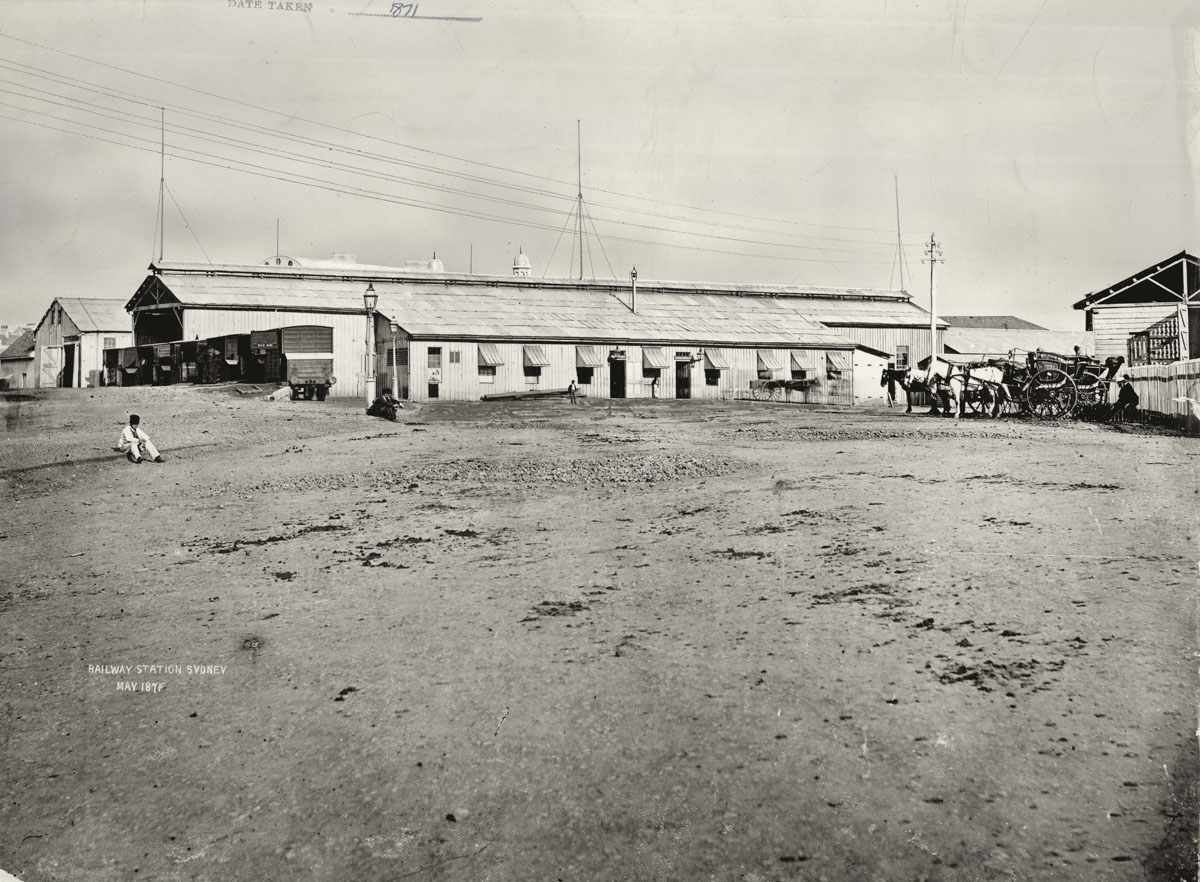
The first Sydney railway terminus, pictured in 1871

This station (one wooden platform in a corrugated iron shed), called "Sydney Terminal", had Devonshire Street as its northern boundary. It was frequently but unofficially called "Redfern Station", while at that time, the present Redfern Station was officially called "Eveleigh". Although called "Redfern Station", the first and second Sydney Terminals were never actually located in Redfern, being to the north of Cleveland Street, which is Redfern's northern boundary.

The first and second station buildings were both in the form of a shed which covered the main line. A photograph of the exterior of the first station taken in 1871 shows vertical boarding, windows with a hood and a corrugated iron roof, with a roof vent. Internally, the stud framing and timber truss roof members were exposed. The offices and public facilities were contained in the adjacent lean-to, which faced George Street.

Only one platform and the main up-line served the passenger station. A similar platform and line layout was used for the Mortuary Station, constructed 15 years later; however, the level of detail and materials varied considerably. The first station building was extended almost immediately, a shed being constructed at the southern end to cover an additional 30 metres (100 ft) of platform.

=== Second Sydney terminal ===
When the station became inadequate for the traffic it carried, a new station was built in 1874 on the same site and was also called Sydney Terminal.

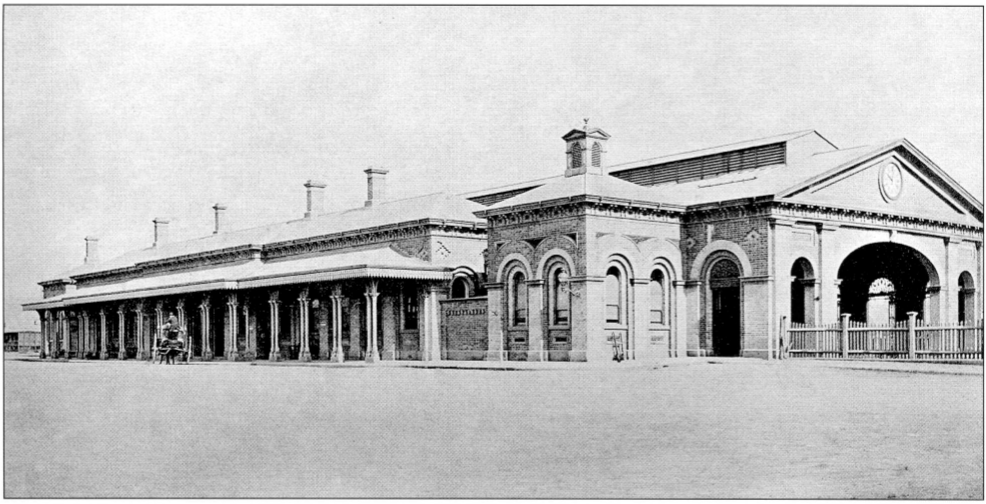
The main building of the second terminal (c.1874)

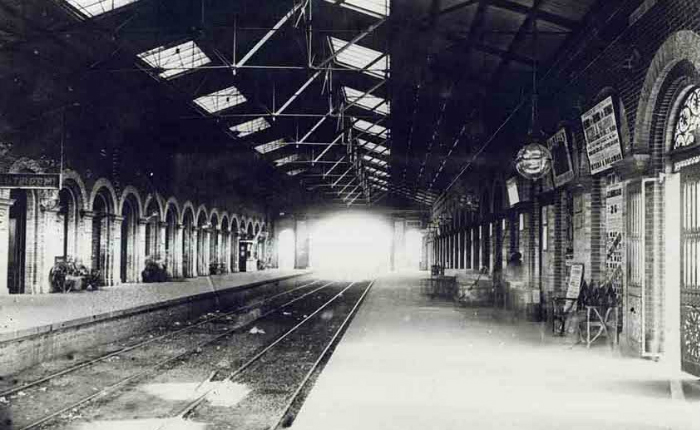
The platforms of the second terminal, (c.1880)

The Second Sydney Terminal was a more substantial brick station building, initially with two platforms. The second station building was constructed on the site of the first station, the main hall spanning the up and down mainlines. Separate platforms and facilities were provided for arriving and departing passengers. The new station building appears to have taken three years to complete: the drawings are dated 1871, while the official opening was in 1874. The second station, like the first, was constructed to allow for a future extension of the line into the city, the lines initially extending just far enough past the building to accommodate a steam locomotive.

John Whitton, the engineer-in-chief, designed a neo-classical station building to be constructed of brick, with the decorative detail formed using polychromatic and relief work. Almost immediately the demand for platform space during peak times resulted in additional branch lines and platforms being constructed adjacent to the passenger station. These lines were brought in front of the station, obscuring it from view and isolating the verandah. By 1890 Whitton's station building had become engulfed within a sea of sheds and tram platform canopies. The second Redfern station, demolished following the completion of the first stage of the main terminal building c. 1906, was a gloomy building, the glass in the roof lantern not permitting a great deal of light to enter and the soot from the steam locomotives coating the surfaces with grime.

The second station grew to 14 platforms before it was replaced by the present-day station to the north of Devonshire Street.

=== Proposals for extension into the city ===
In major metropolitan areas the rail terminus tended to be located within the inner core of the city. The site of the first and second station termini was inconveniently located for the city. Initially, a horse-drawn omnibus service operated from the station to the city and both the engineer-in-chief, John Whitton, and the Chief Commissioner for Railways, B. H. Martindale, recognised the urgency of a city rail extension.

In 1877, John Young, a prominent Sydney builder and local politician, proposed a scheme to provide a circular city extension to the railway. The route included stations at Oxford Street, William Street and Woolloomooloo in the east, Circular Quay, then Dawes Point and a line parallel to Darling Harbour in the west. John Whitton designed a grand city terminus at the corner of Hunter and Castlereagh Streets two years later. Neither of these schemes eventuated.

In 1895, the Parliamentary Standing Committee on Public Works advised that a royal commission should be constituted to "inquire into the question of bringing the railway from its present terminus at Redfern into the city". The findings of the commission, favouring a site in St James Road, were released in 1897. The term Central Station was now in common use. The public works annual report of 1896–1897 noted that "the Railway Construction Branch was called upon to furnish voluminous plans and estimates of the cost of the various proposals brought before the commission. After a most exhaustive investigation, the Royal Commission reported, almost unanimously, in favour of the extension of the railway into the city by the route and according to the plan as described as the St James Road Scheme".

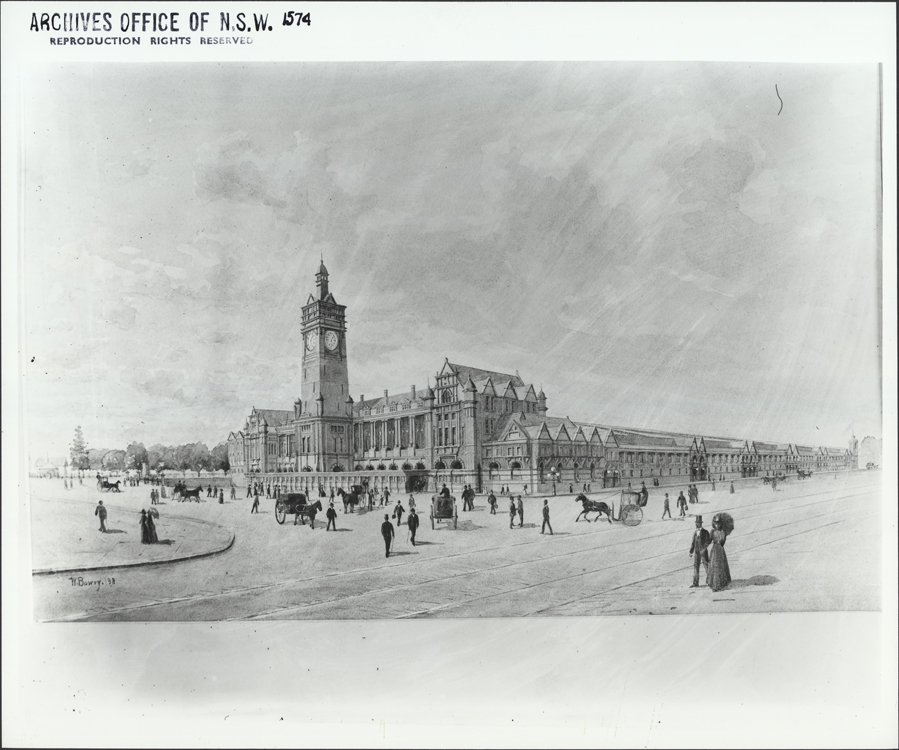
An early design entry for the proposed station at Hyde Park (c.1898)

In 1897, Norman Selfe drew up a scheme for the gradual enlargement and extension of the railway to the northern end of the city and in the same year Railway Commissioner, E. M. G. Eddy, proposed a terminal city station at the corner of Elizabeth Street and St James' Road. The route of the latter was virtually the same as that for 1879, however, the new site for the terminus included half of the northern end of Hyde Park. Although 6 hectares (16 acres) of the burial ground in Devonshire Street was offered as compensation, public sentiment still opposed the loss of Hyde Park. The initial designs for a near Sydney Terminal were prepared by Henry Deane, the Engineer-in-Chief of Railway Construction in consultation with the Railway Commissioners. Deane is reputed to have prepared 10 schemes for the royal commission. Although the St James location was preferred, a scheme that did not involve the disturbance of or use of land in Hyde Park was sought. The extension of Belmore Park was initially proposed in the 1897 scheme as compensation for the use of the northwestern corner of Hyde Park as a railway station. Following a change of government the St James scheme was abandoned and Deane prepared, c. 1899, a further two schemes, one of which was for the Old Burial Ground Site.

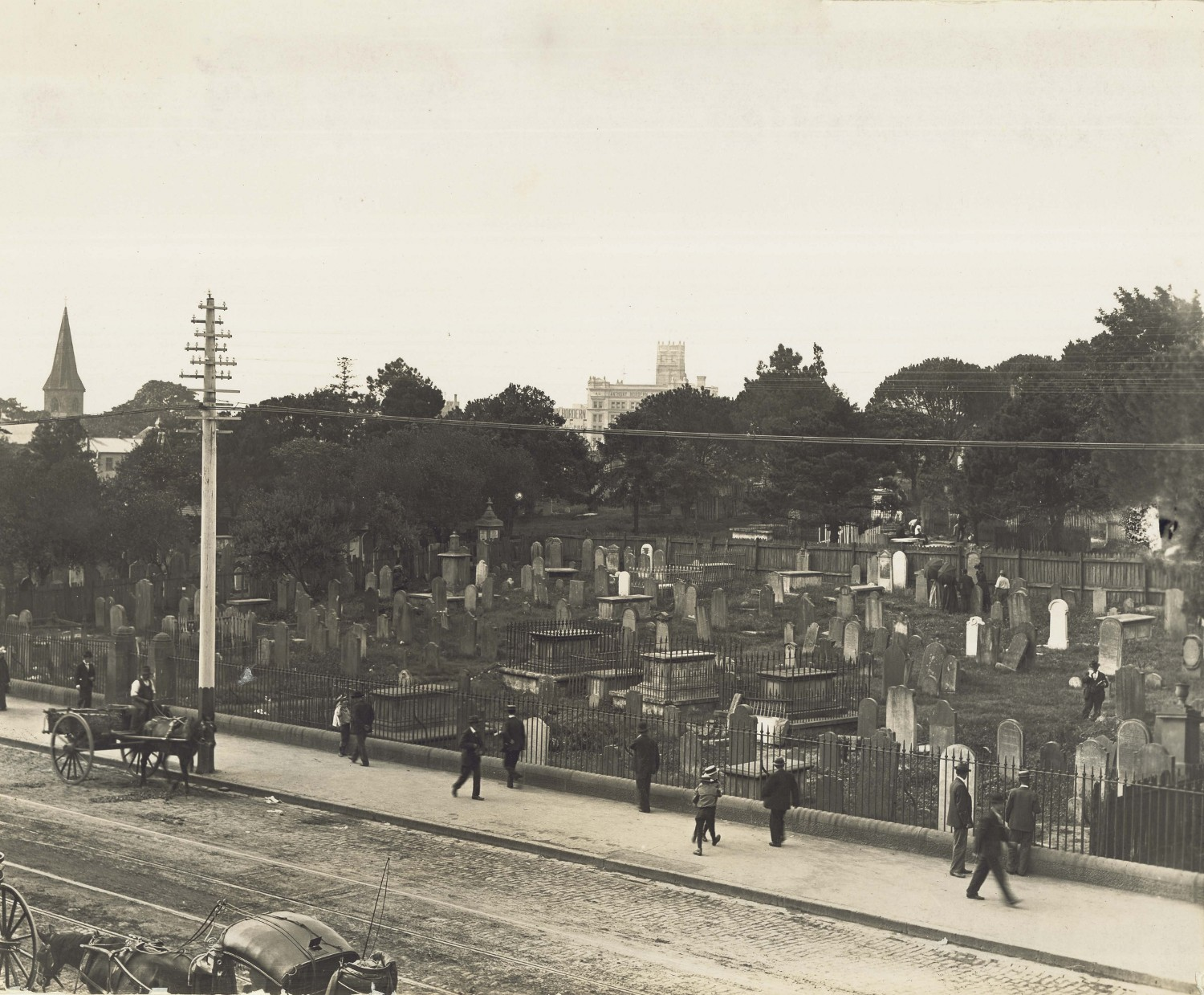
Central station was built on land previously occupied by the Devonshire Street Cemetery

The royal commission in 1897 again considered the city railway extension because of dangerous congestion at Redfern and recommended using Hyde Park. Then, after an investigative trip overseas, Henry Deane prepared alternative proposals for a new railway terminal for the government in 1900. The second scheme proposal called for the resumption of the Devonshire Street cemeteries, but this was cheaper and less contentious than the acquisition of Hyde Park. It was the second scheme which was eventually adopted.

The earlier schemes to extend the lines further into the city would have been prohibitively expensive and would have required large scale resumptions. The site of the Old Burial ground was, in comparison, relatively easily obtainable as no private land was involved. Due to the extent of the resumption there would, in addition to a terminus, be room for the extension of the goods yard and the erection of a carriage shed and post office. The existing lines were at a higher level than the Burial Ground, so rather than lowering the existing railway track, the tramlines were to be raised to serve a high level station. The Public Works Committee passed the design on 7 June 1900, however, a much modified building was actually constructed.

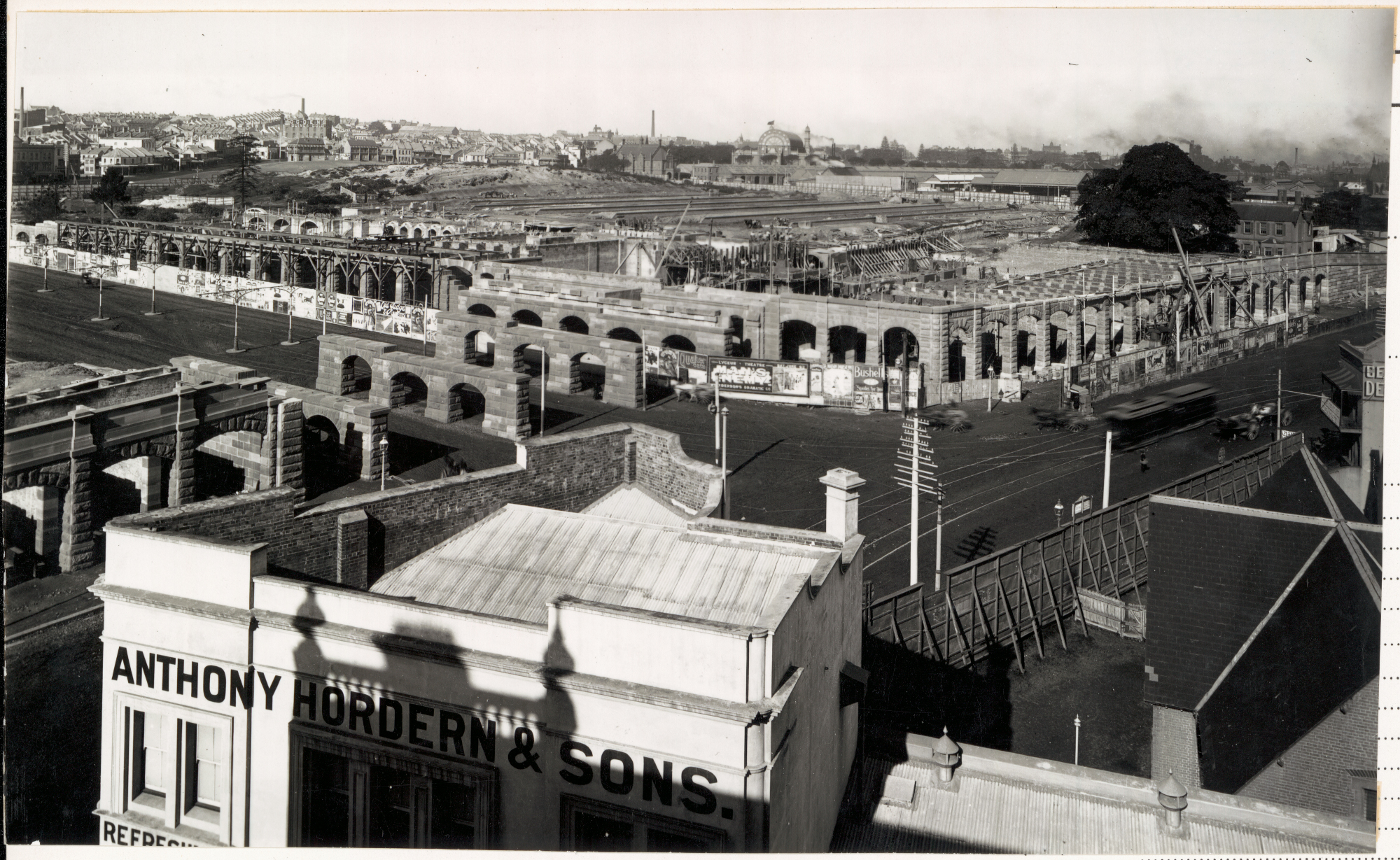
The station under construction, June 1903

The total estimated cost of the works was to be £561,000 with the general works estimated at £138,000, the Station Building estimated at £233,000 and the Resumptions estimated at £140,000. Almost immediately these estimates proved conservative, there was much public concern regarding the removal of bodies from the Old Burial ground and a new cemetery, the Botany Cemetery, had to be constructed, at public expense, at La Perouse.

=== Third Sydney terminal (Central station) ===
==== Devonshire Street Cemetery work and construction of third Sydney terminal ====
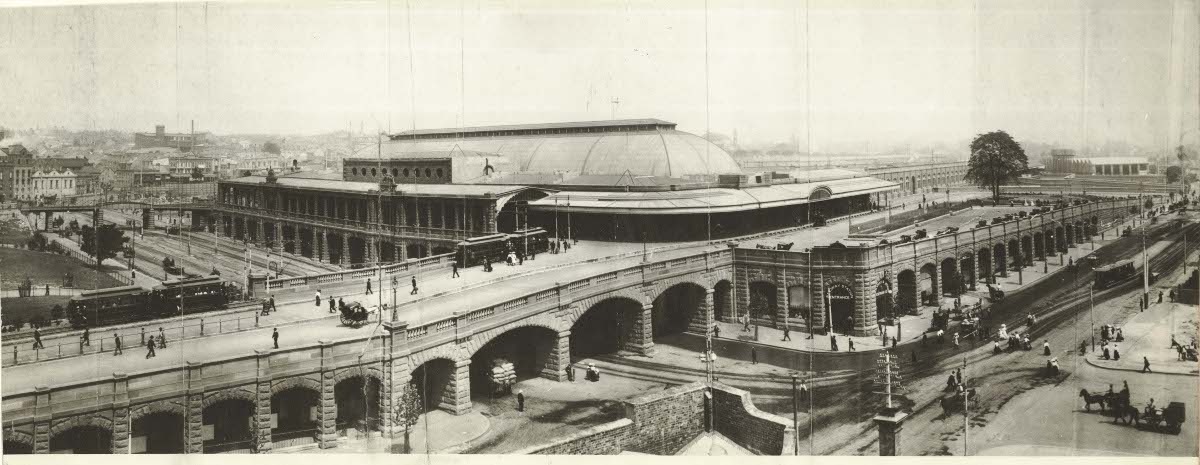
The completed station in 1906. The clock tower and the upper levels would be later additions

When the third station was built in 1906, it moved one block north, closer to the city. It fronted Garden Road, which was realigned to form Eddy Avenue. If Belmore Park is included, all the land now occupied by the railway at Central and Redfern coincides with the company's original selection of four blocks between Hay and Cleveland Streets. The present station was officially opened on 4 August 1906 and opening for passengers on 5 August 1906.

During Governor Macquarie's term, the future site of the Sydney Terminal was beyond the limits of settlement, which were marked by the tollhouse located at the end of George Street and at the entrance to Railway Square.

Central station was designed by the government architect, Walter Liberty Vernon. The new station was built on a site previously occupied by the Devonshire Street Cemetery, South Sydney Morgue, the Convent of the Good Samaritan, the Sydney Female Refuge, police barracks and superintendent's residence (on Pitt Street), Christ Church Parsonage, the Benevolent Asylum (fronting Railway Square), a steam train depot (at the corner of Pitt Street with Garden Road), as well as some residential properties on Railway Place. The convent, female refuge and police barracks were all original part of "Carters Barracks", built in 1819 to house convict gangs working as carters on the brick fields. The adjacent field which is today Belmore Park was known as the "police paddock", after the police barracks.

The remains exhumed from the cemetery were re-interred at several other Sydney cemeteries including Rookwood and Waverley cemeteries. Bodies were moved to Botany by steam tram motors and flat cars.

==== Terminus redesign ====
E. O'Sullivan, the Minister for Works, in 1901, established the [Central] Station Advisory Board, comprising railway experts to "investigate the question of the design and arrangements of the station". The members included Walter Liberty Vernon, both of the chief engineers of the New South Wales railway (for railway construction and existing lines respectively), and the chief engineers of the Queensland and Victorian railways. The committee also considered a suitable design for the new Flinders Street station in Melbourne. The design for the Sydney Terminus was to be a collaboration between the architect and the railway engineers. The layout was largely determined by the planning requirements of the railway engineers, to which an appropriate architectural style was overlaid. However, the initial scheme did not contain the required accommodation and an enlargement of the building was approved by the minister. The cost estimate was now £610,000. The board were to fulfil the wishes of the minister that "the building should be a monumental work of stateliness and beauty".

An early proposal for the new terminus, and the changes to the surrounding area, were reported in the Sydney Mail in 1901:

One of the reforms to be incidentally effected will be the widening of Pitt Street near the railway to 100ft. The width will secured by taking in land on the right already resumed or in Government hands, and including the Benevolent Asylum grounds, the convent along the northern side of Pitt Street where it debouches upon George Street. The result will be a fine, broad thoroughfare, tree bordered to form the entrance to the city... ...Mr O'Sullivan is also conferring with Mr S Horden to see if an arrangement can be made for the purpose of widening Gipps Street, at present a narrow thoroughfare before any new buildings are erected. By planting these broad streets on each side with trees, Mr O'Sullivan contends that a magnificent entrance to the city will be established and the trees will set off the new station. He considers that this opportunity for the improvement and ornamentation of Sydney should not be lost, especially as it will not entail a very heavy cost upon the tax payer, most of the land utilised already being the property of the crown. There will be four double and four single platforms, or practically twelve single platforms in all... Between the end of the docks and the main buildings is the assembly platform, 70ft wide. On the platform level will be booking offices, waiting rooms, cloak and luggage offices, lavatories, convenient refreshment rooms, dining rooms, etc. The basement will be devoted to kitchens, stores, baggage rooms, offices for minor officials, and a dining room for the Railway Commissioners and their staffs, including the clerical, professional, traffic and audit branches. The railway is to cross Devonshire Street, which as a street for heavy traffic will cease to exist. It will be lowered and modified, to suite pedestrian, cab and light traffic only, with a width of 50ft. The heavy traffic hitherto taken over Devonshire Street will be diverted along Belmore Road and a new street which is to be made on the east side of the station. Cabs will enter the station from Devonshire Street. The exit for cabs will lead into Pitt Street by an inclined ramp and subway, thus avoiding any crossing on the level of the path of either pedestrians or tramcars. The main approach to the station will be opposite the intersection of George and Pitt Street, and foot passengers, and cabs and other vehicles will enter here. Departure for vehicles will be effected by means of a ramp, descending from the north west corner of the building to Belmore Road. A subway for pedestrians to enter the building is to be provided from a point in Pitt Street, nearly opposite the north western corner of the building. The tramway approaches have been so designed as to take them completely clear of all other classes of traffic and congestion, and interference and risk of injury will be altogether obviated. It is intended that the railway traffic should run as now arranged over the Castlereagh and Pitt Street route, but, instead of approaching the station on the ground level, the two lines begin to rise from a point in Belmore Park on a grade of 1 in 20, where they will terminate with a wide colonnade of (sic) platform level.

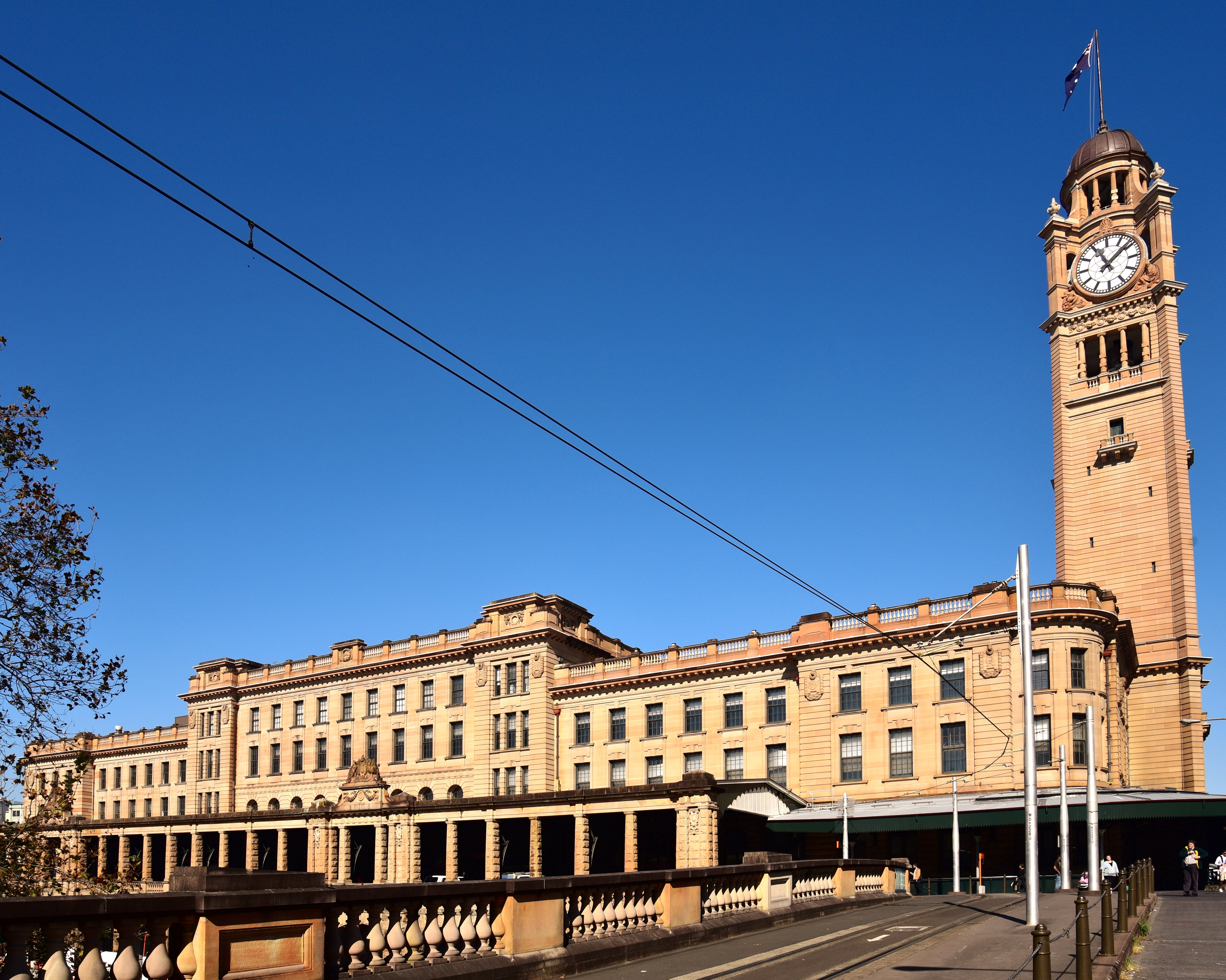
The main facade as viewed from the elevated viaduct

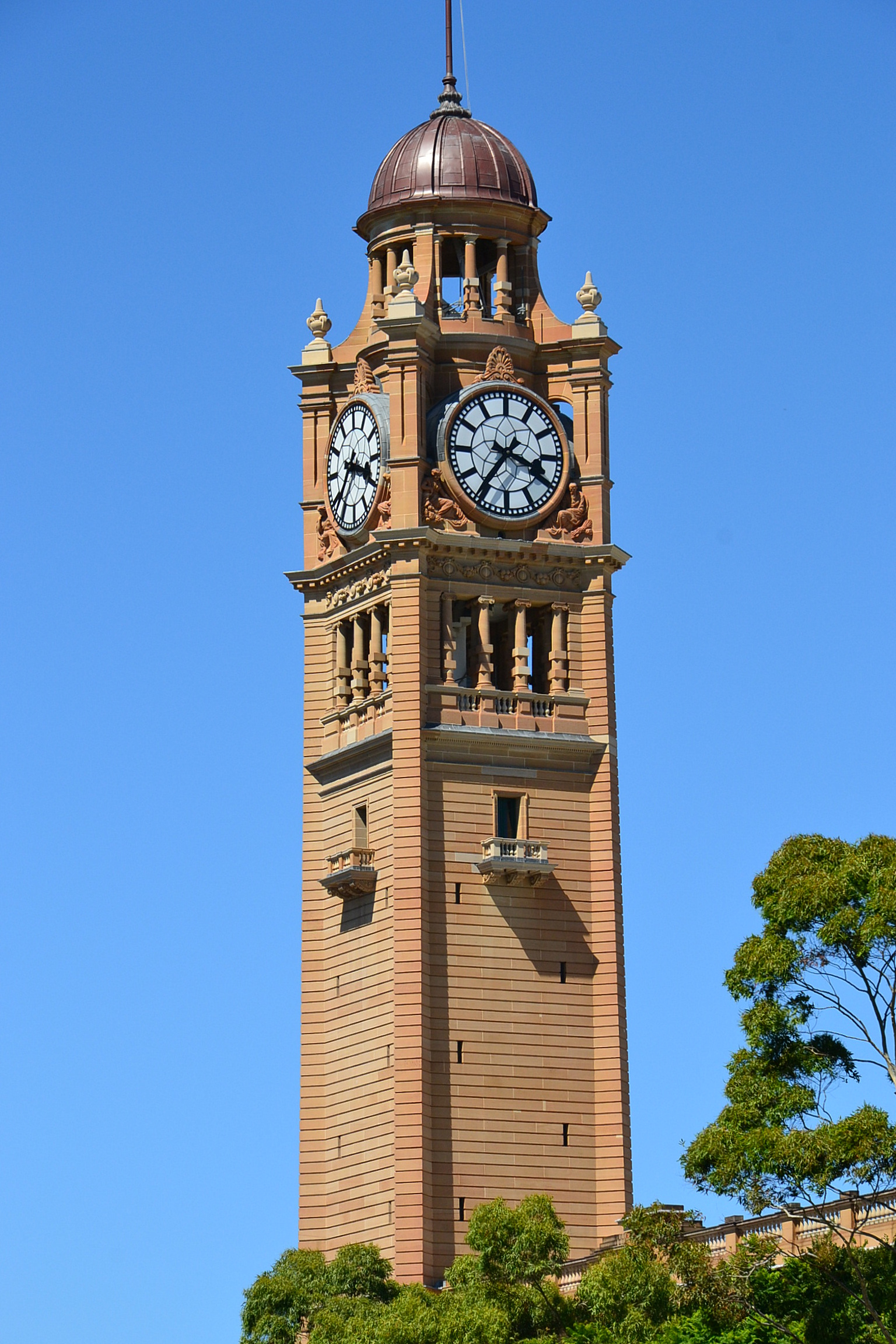
Clock tower

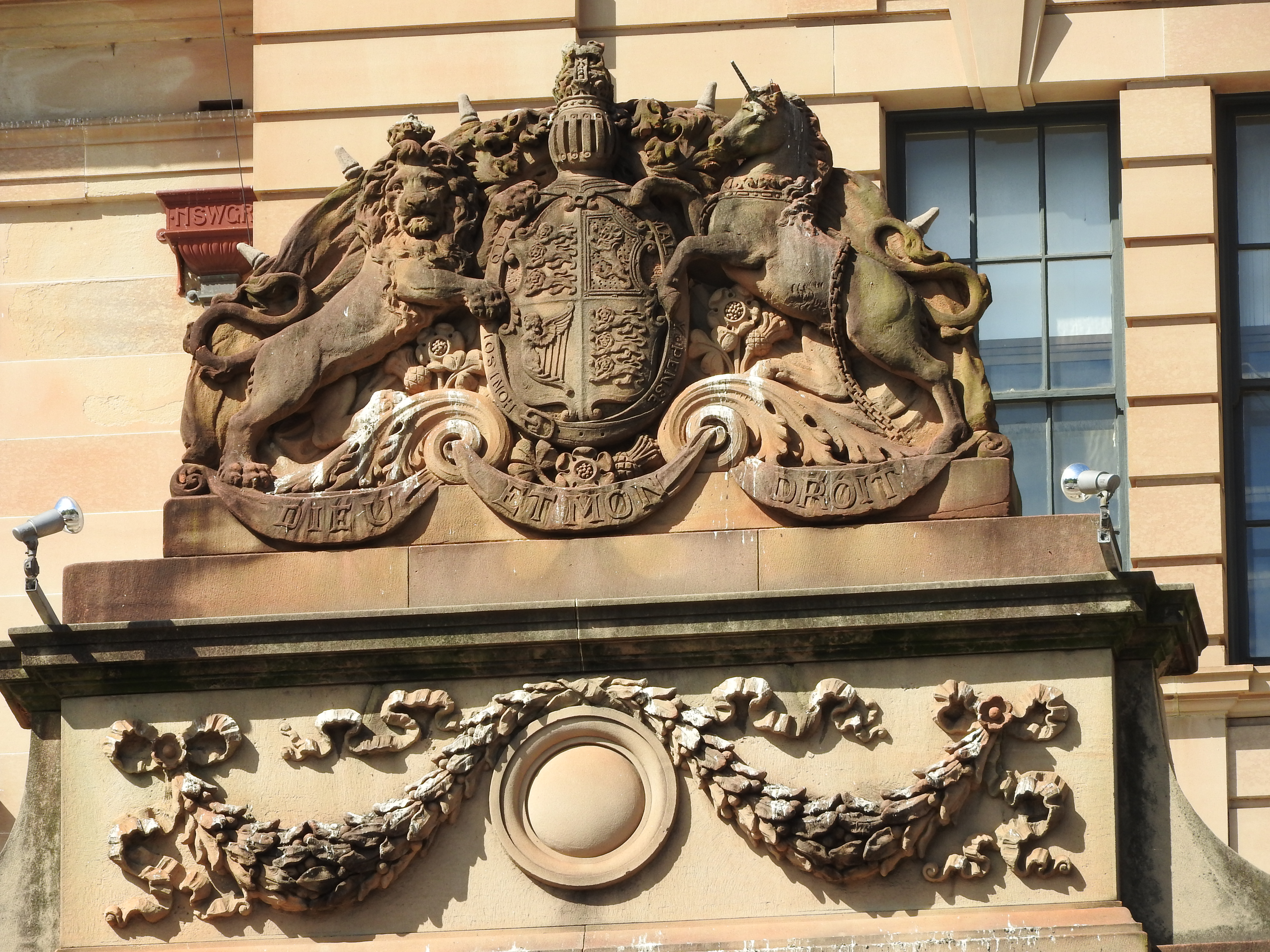
Coat of arms

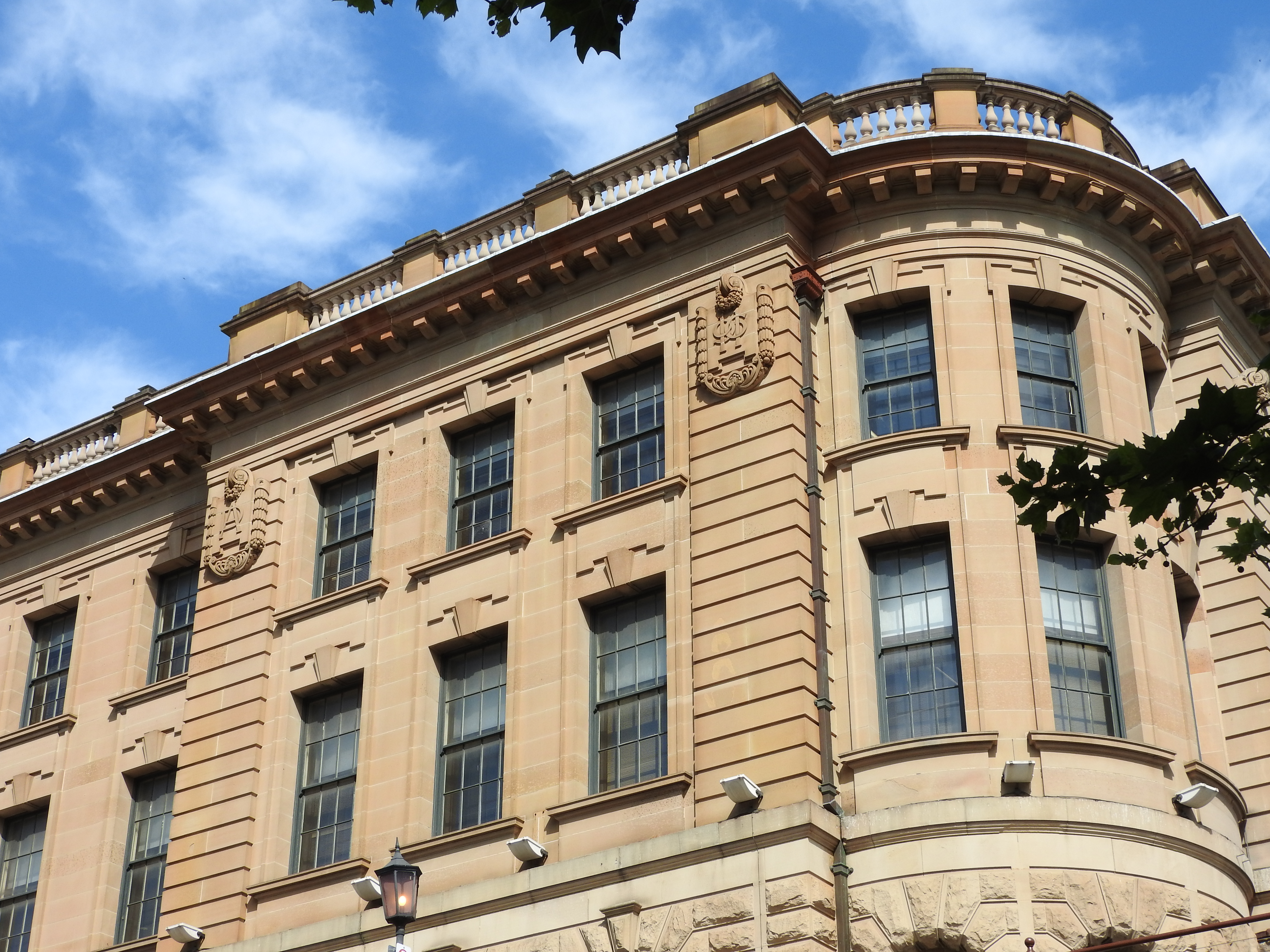
Sandstone facade

This design, with pavilions and a mansard roof, was strongly influenced by French Renaissance chateaux. The scale of the building, arrangement of the approaches and viaducts, the ground level colonnade and the position of the clocktower are all similar to the subsequent scheme, which was actually constructed.

By June 1901, work had begun on forming the site of the new station at Devonshire Street, the PWD Annual Report for 1900/01 noting that "a great deal of preliminary work has had to be done in the preparation of the site for the new station and the extension of the railway, owing to the necessity of removing the bodies from the old cemetery and providing a new cemetery to receive the remains, as well as the demolition of the buildings and disposal of the material. The work of clearing and levelling is now well in hand." "Private removals were commenced on the 29th of February 1901 and at the end of the year 1,145 bodies had been removed." Families could remove the remains to a cemetery of their choosing, however, the majority of bodies removed were relocated, at government expense, to the new cemetery at La Perouse. The Belmore Park to Fort Macquarie Electric Tramway was also constructed in 1900–1901. The earlier brick and sandstone design, with a mansard roof, was abandoned in favour of an all sandstone terminus building which largely incorporated the same passenger, tram and vehicle separation as the earlier scheme. During 1899 a Parliamentary Standing Committee had debated whether the major public buildings should be constructed of brick with a sandstone trim or all sandstone. This committee determined that, for major public buildings, sandstone should be used.

Two designs, by members of the Government Architects Branch, were submitted for the façades in October 1901 to the Minister for Public Works and to the Railway Commissioners with the accompanying comment by the "Board of Experts" advising on the design of Central Station "we are of the opinion that either one or the other of the architectural designs which accompany this report may with confidence be adopted". Of the two façade options, that of Gorrie McLeish Blair was reputedly selected. The 1901/02 Annual Report describes the progress a year later, "work has progressed vigorously during the year. All the old buildings and human remains have been removed from the site and the foundation stone was laid at the corner of Pitt-street and the New Belmore road on the 30th April. The information of New-Street, 2 chains in width, the extension of Castlereagh-street and the widening of Hay and Elizabeth Streets is well forward. The levelling of the whole site is practically finished, and great improvements have been made to Belmore and Prince Alfred Parks by filling in with the spoil excavated for the foundations".

A more detailed account is given of the excavation: "the excavation to the docks and main building containing some 80,000 cubic yards, has been taken out and the material removed to Belmore Park, where it forms the tramway embankments and raises the general level of the park. About 30,000 cubic yards of material from the Castlereagh-street cutting have been utilised in improving the level of Prince Alfred Park."

In early 1902, the design of the terminus building was changed yet again, at the request of the "Board of Experts" advising on the design of Central that "the station building has been increased in height by one storey, and considerably in length of front, and an east wing added. A tower also of fine proportions has been included. The completed building consequently shows a much larger building than originally proposed, but it is thought in the future it will come into use. In the meantime, certain parts can be left out and added afterwards, but in spite of all such reduction the estimated cost of the new building and the main roof will amount to about £400,000 as compared with £230,000".

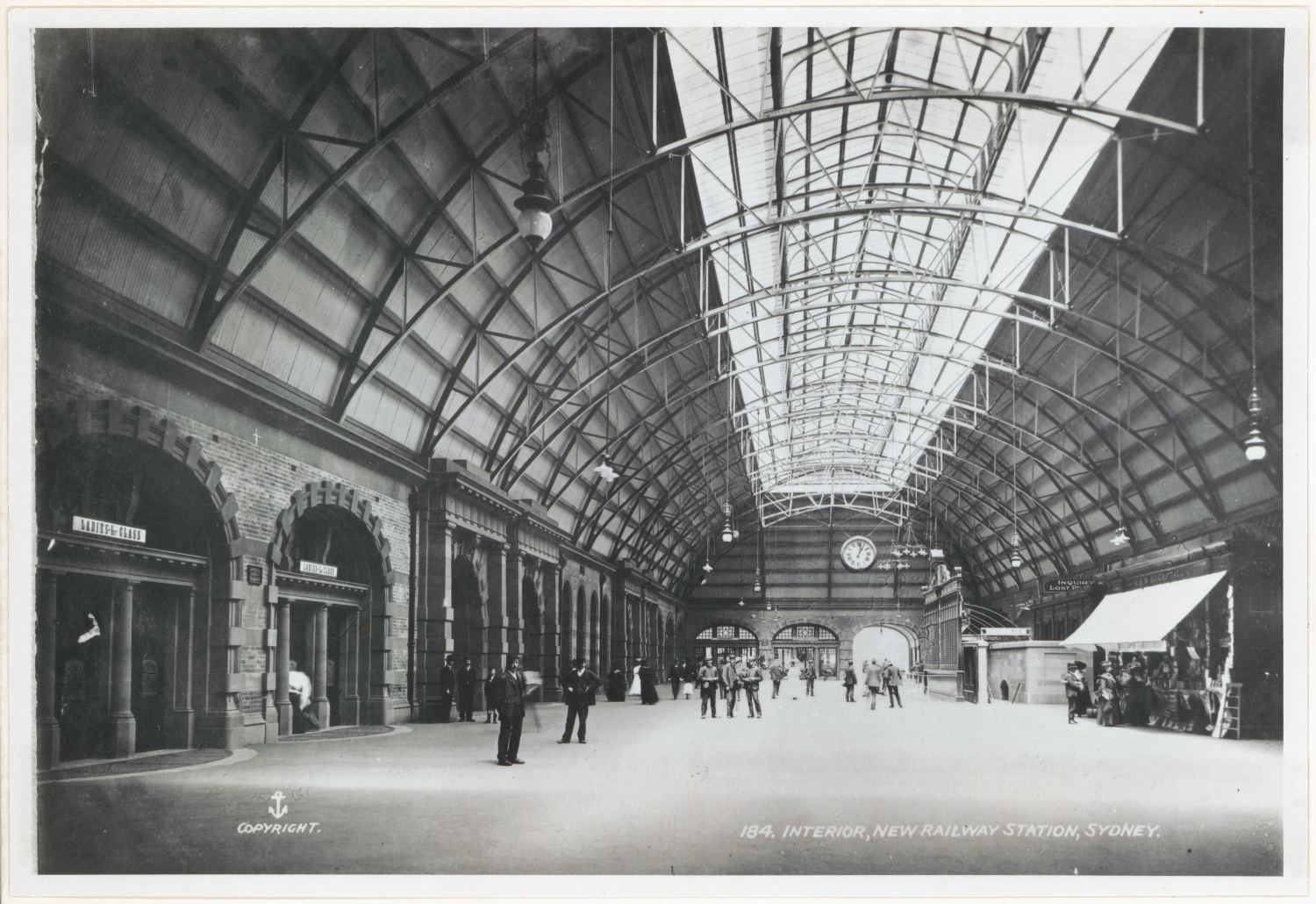
The Grand Concourse upon completion of the station, 1906

As it was being built, it was reported that "Everything in connection with the new station appears to have been designed on a grand scale, from the great elevated approaches down to the system of handling luggage underground." It is listed on the NSW State Heritage Register and the now defunct Register of the National Estate.

Henry Deane, in a lecture given to the Sydney University Engineering Society in 1902, describes the layout of the Central Railway Station that was currently under construction: In his lecture, he also discusses many of the technical aspects of the design including luggage handling, the lifts, the water towers, the train shed roof, which was subsequently deleted as a cost-cutting measure, the platforms and signalling. A novel method of luggage handling was designed for Central to "get rid of the objectionable luggage-trolley, which is always frightening nervous people". An overhead luggage carrying system had been developed in England, however, in the case of Central station, "the levels permit of its being carried on underground by means of subways and lifts at suitable points". The mail was also to be transferred by subway.

The train shed roof was to be designed to have a central span of 198 ft (60 m) with two sides spans of 78 ft (24 m). Three pin trusses were to be employed, which were to be brought to the ground to provide intermediate support. The roof was to be continuous. This truss and roof configuration was to be based on that of the Union Station, St Louis, visited by Deane in 1894. Such a roof would have rivalled those of the major metropolitan termini in Europe and America. The platform area was to be double that of the earlier station and correspondingly double the number of passengers could be accommodated. The maximum number of passengers that the Devonshire Street station could accommodate was 20,000; the new station would be able to accommodate 40,000. The location of the cab rank was also discussed, it having been decided not to incorporate a cab rank inside the building so that the new station could be "kept entirely free from the smell, which the standing of horses under the roof must certainly involve".

The last train departed platform 5 of the 1874 station at midnight of 4 August 1906. During the remainder of that night, the passenger concourse was demolished and the line extended through the old station into the new station. The Western Mail arrived at 05:50 on 5 August 1906 at the new station. Devonshire Street, which separated the two stations, became a pedestrian underpass to allow people to cross the railway line and is now known by many as the Devonshire Street Tunnel.

An 85.6-metre-tall (281 ft) clock tower in the Free Classical style was added at the north-western corner of the station, opening on 12 March 1921. The clock was designed by Richard Lamb and Alfred Fairfax, the co-founders of Fairfax & Roberts.

=== Tram approaches and Belmore Park ===
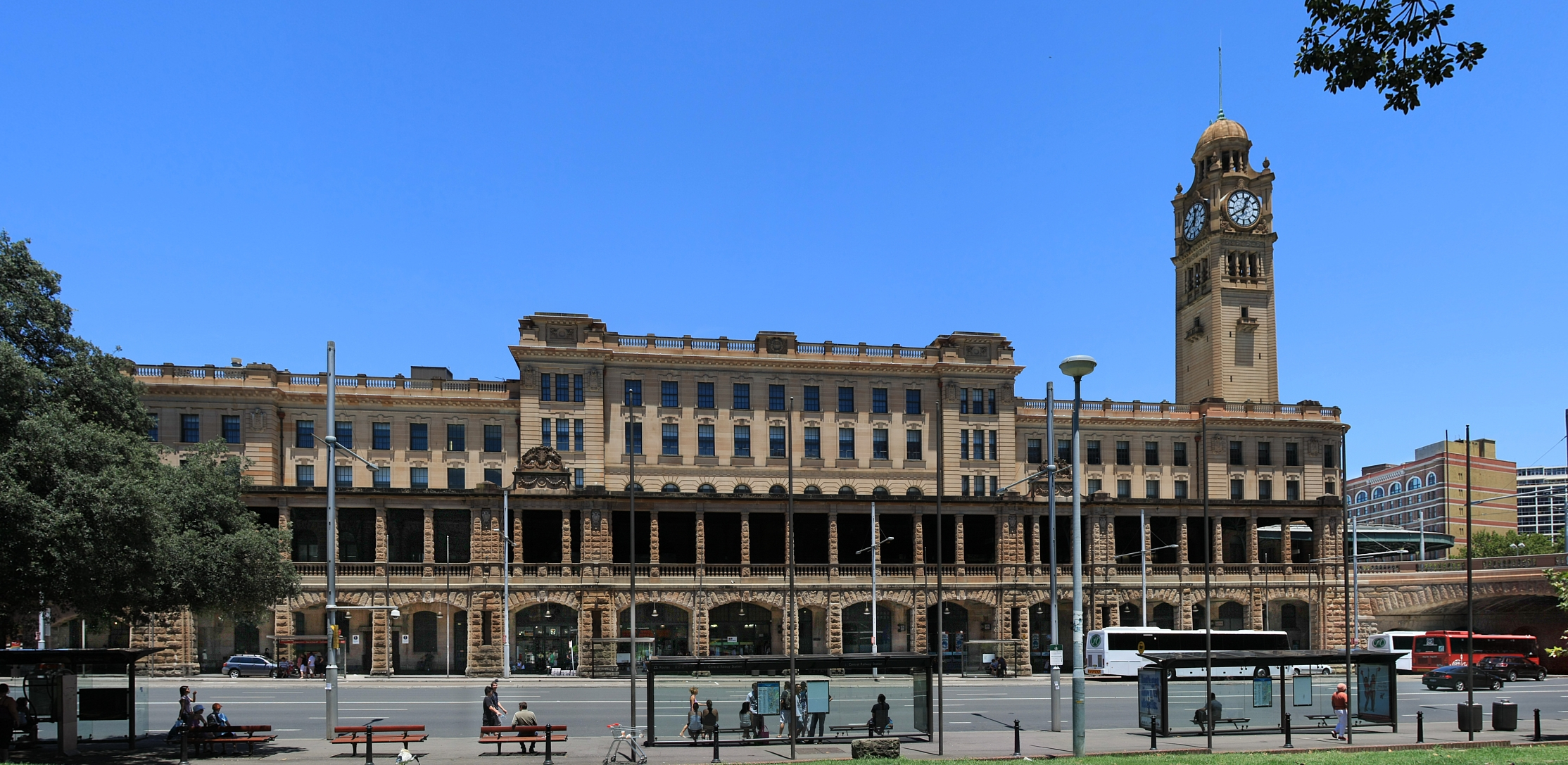
View of the station from Belmore Park

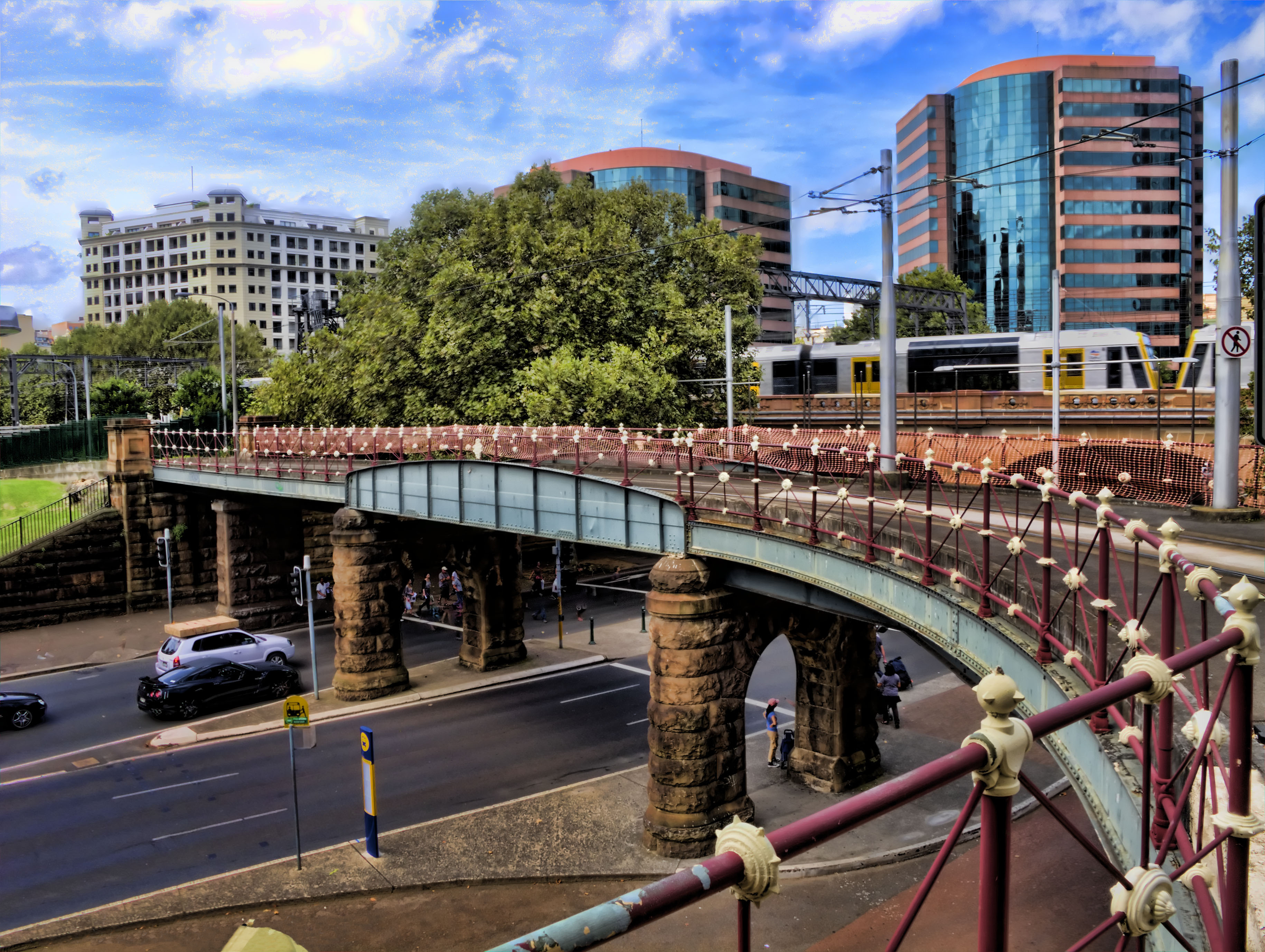
The elevated viaduct, serving the Inner West Light Rail

On a continuous axis with the first station building, Belmore Park originally fronted the first Hay and Corn Markets in Hay Street. When the third station was located one block further north, it linked up with the southern side of Belmore Park. The park then fortuitously provided a green foil to the commanding city front of the station.

In 1902, the Railway and Tramway Construction Branch, headed by Henry Deane, reported that "plans and detail drawings have been prepared in the office for the whole of the retaining wall and shops in Pitt-Street, both north and south of the new road in front of the Station, also for the Devonshire-Street subway and for the whole of the basement floors, including drainage, telephone tunnels, &c." At this stage, the estimated cost of the works was 561,600 pounds, however, it was "probable that his estimate will be exceeded".

The necessary tramway deviations, 2.75 miles (4.43 km) of track, were laid in 1901–02 using day labour. The track consisted of rails laid on sleepers. The curve and the poles were manufactured by local engineering firms including Clyde Engineering Co. The Permanent Way (i.e. track) was imported either from England or America. The construction of the first stage of the station began in June 1902 and was completed in August 1906. By 30 June 1903 the following works had been completed:

... the total quantity earth removed is about 250,500 cubic yards. This has been used to level up the station site as required. Belmore Park has been raised to carry the tramways to the station... The Sports Grounds Moore Park (cycling ground) have been formed and the best of the clay had been disposed of to Messrs. Goodlet & Smith at their brickworks ... The whole of the foundations to the main buildings have been taken out and concreted. On 21st July, 1902, the first order for building stone was given to Mr Saunders, at Pyrmont Quarry. On the 6th of August Inspector Murray went to Pyrmont Quarry to arrange for starting work dressing stone. On the 7th August eleven masons started work, and on the 18th the first dressed stone was landed on the works from Pyrmont Quarry and was set in place on No. 3 Pier, arrival bridge, on the 19th August; and since that date 127,000 cubic feet have been built into place. This stone has been used in the building of retaining wall, Pitt Street, between Hay Street and the Ambulance Depot, near Devonshire-street; the tramway arrival and departure bridges, the piers of which have been carried up to impost and girder-bed level. Shop fronts and arcades in Pitt-street ... the whole of [the] arcade with shop fronts and front wall to the main building from Pitt-street to the extreme eastern end of the building, including the east wing have been carried up to the first floor level.

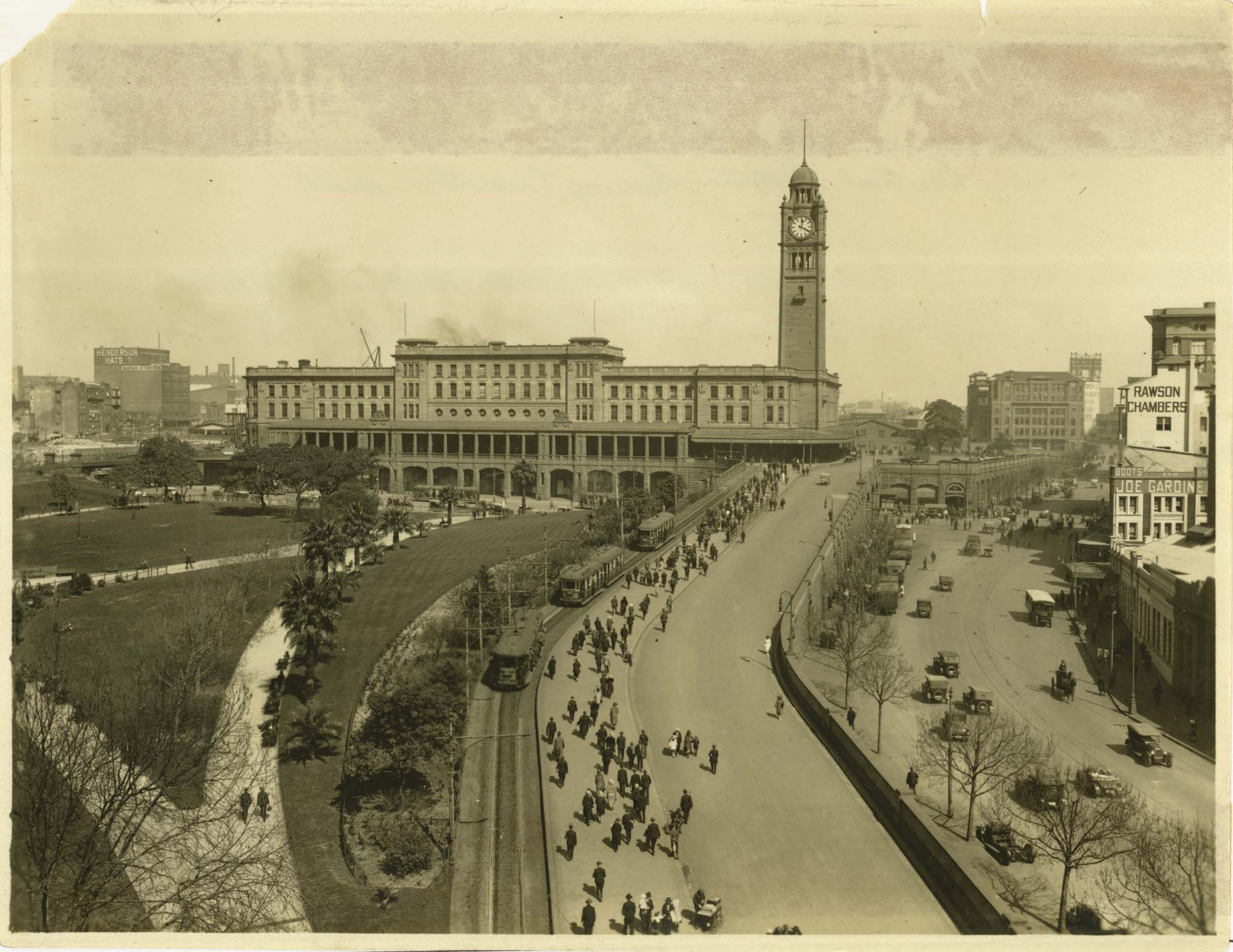
The station viewed from Belmore Park, 1924

The 1908 Royal Commission for the Improvement of the City of Sydney and its Suburbs offered two schemes which, in providing vehicular access, attempted to resolve the discrepancy in scale between Belmore Park and the station building. The scheme presented by John Sulman consisted of two circular roadways, one above the other, around Belmore Park. The Commissioners, however, favoured a less grandiose Scheme prepared by Norman Selfe.

Its main feature is the raising of Belmore Park to the level of the station platform between raised roads in the eastern half of a widened Pitt Street on the one hand and the western half of a widened Elizabeth Street on the other, with a connecting viaduct along Eddy Avenue and a retaining-wall to support the raised park along its Hay Street alignment.

Although neither scheme was attempted, Selfe's proposal is recalled in the Elizabeth Street ramp which was built in 1925 to allow the extension of an electric connection to the city. The park, needless to say, was never raised to the height of the assembly platform.

=== Eastern façade ===
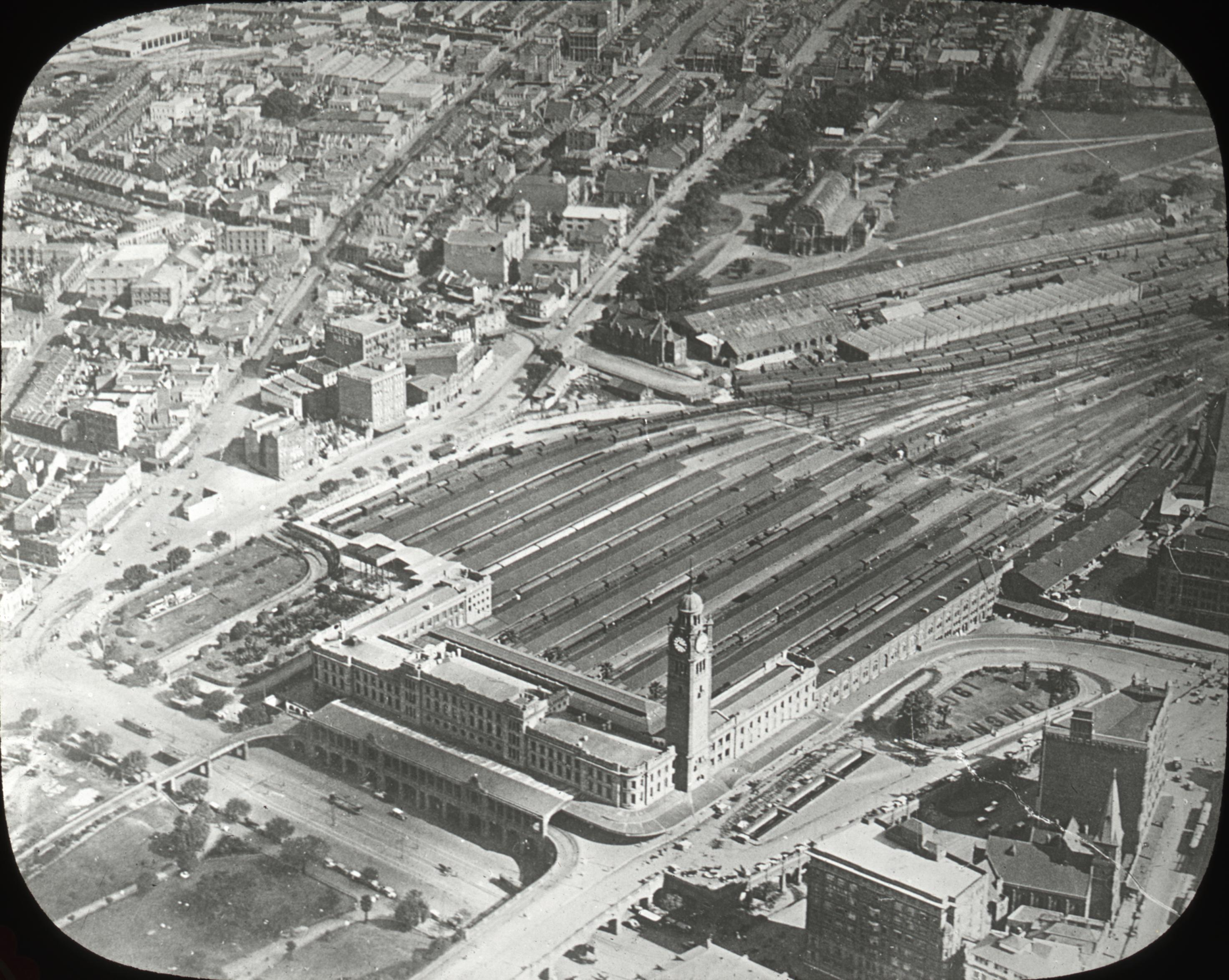
Aerial view of Sydney Terminal before 1926, showing the simpler eastern section of the station. The easternmost platforms (16–19) were replaced by the suburban through-platforms and viaduct in 1926.

The Elizabeth Street façade of the Sydney Terminus has received less attention. Facing the working class terraces in Surry Hills, the eastern wing was finished in brick rather than stone when shortage of funds hurried completion of the first stage of the station in 1906. It was the obvious location for expansion when new platforms were added to the original complex to provide the electrical city and suburban connection in 1926. The grand station building is eclipsed from view at street level by the Elizabeth Street ramp, and the later semi-circular classical entrance portico to the city connection is in refined contrast to the rusticated blocks and heavy treatment of the main building.

=== Battle of Central station (1916) ===
The Liverpool riot of 1916, sometimes called the "battle of Central station", took place after soldiers rebelling against camp conditions had raided hotels in Liverpool and travelled to the city by commandeered trains. Upon arrival at Central station, the rioters set about destroying the station facilities, and fire was exchanged between rampaging rioters and military police. One rioter was shot dead and several were injured. The only remaining evidence of the gun battle is a small bullet-hole in the marble by the entrance to platform 1. This incident had a direct influence on the introduction of 6 o'clock closing of hotels in 1916, which lasted in New South Wales until 1955.

=== Electrification ===
The original proposal for electrification was for the North Shore line, from Hornsby to Milsons Point, a separate line which could be electrified without impact on the remainder of the rail system. However, due to the necessity of building the City Underground Railway and the proposal for a Sydney Harbour Bridge, not to mention the expansion of the Illawarra and Bankstown lines, the program was altered in order that the electrification could be linked with these proposed expansions. From Well Street, Redfern eight tracks would continue as the City Railway whilst four would carry the country trains to the Sydney Terminal. An above ground station would include a link to allow the transfer of passengers and baggage to the Sydney Terminal. This new station was constructed on the east side.

South of the station buildings, additional works built to accommodate the electrification and expansion of the city and suburban lines included extensions to the Cleveland Street Bridge and flyovers. The Devonshire Street subway and Devonshire Street wall were extended through the new suburban section. The new viaduct along Elizabeth Street included new bridges over Eddy Avenue, Campbell Street and Hay Street and a new retaining wall along Elizabeth Street.

=== Modernisation ===
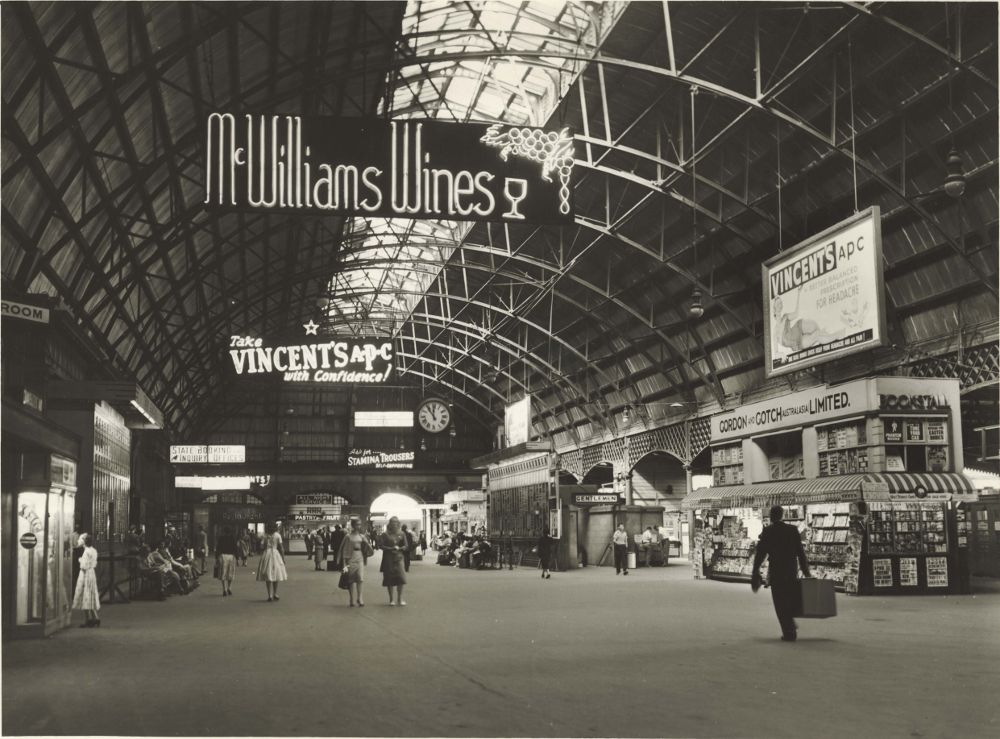
The Grand Concourse, c. 1958

Modernisation programs were undertaken in 1955 and again in 1964. In the 1955 work, a booking hall was created (in the former refreshment room, now the railway bar). Murals depicting railway scenes lined the walls and a terrazzo map of Australia was installed on the floor. In October 1980 a modernisation program at the Sydney Terminal commenced. The objective of the work was to improve the facilities for both passenger convenience and comfort. The start of this modernisation program coincided with the 125th Anniversary of the NSW Railways and it was at a time when many major service advances were being made to the State Rail System.

=== Darling Harbour line ===
In addition to the construction of the main trunk line between Sydney and Parramatta in 1855, a branch line between Darling Harbour and the Sydney Yard, with a cutting and underpass to carry the line under George Street, was also constructed. This line was to allow for the transfer of goods to be exported by ship, primarily wool bales. In the first decades of settlement goods were loaded and unloaded in Sydney Cove, however, as the city expanded the wharves extended round into Cockle Bay (Darling Harbour). The presence of the rail link would have influenced the development of this harbour. The Darling Harbour Line was one of the first cuttings and overbridges to be constructed as part of the NSW Rail network. In contrast to later structures sandstone was used to line the walls of the underpass and to form the overbridge. The Darling Harbour Line partially followed the line of an existing water course, the Blackwattle Creek. Subsequent alterations to the layout of Railway Square have resulted in extensions to the overbridge.

The line fell into disuse with the demise of Darling Harbour as a working harbour in the second half of the 20th century. Part of the railway, from Haymarket at Hay Street, near the Powerhouse Museum connecting to the Metropolitan Goods railway line to Lilyfield and Dulwich Hill, became part of the new Inner West Light Rail. Trams entering the city via the light rail line deviate from the Darling Harbour Line at Hay Street to run via surface streets to the Central station colonnade.

For a time, the remainder of the former Darling Harbour Line, from Sydney Yard to Hay Street, remained disused and functional, and was used to transfer trains to the Powerhouse Museum. Most of this section, from the Devonshire Street Tunnel to Hay Street, was converted to a pedestrianised linear park called The Goods Line in stages in 2012 and 2015.

The final part of the Darling Harbour Line, a tunnel under Railway Square, is intact but disused. There are proposals to also pedestrianise it.

=== Sydney Yard ===
The first Sydney railway workshop, constructed c. 1855, was a substantial two storey sandstone building with arched openings to both floors and a slate roof. A boiler, for the production of steam, was located at the southern end of the building. By 1865, a timber extension had been constructed over a section of track to allow the locomotives to be worked on under cover. A blacksmiths forge was located in an adjacent single storey building. In contrast with the first Redfern Station building (Sydney Terminal) the main workshop building was an elaborately detailed sandstone building, with a rock-faced ashlar base, quoins and sills. The use of substantial and well-detailed sandstone buildings on the site was to continue with the construction of the twin-gabled goods shed, the Mortuary Station and finally the present station building and its approaches.

Originally the Sydney Yard occupied the area between the passenger station and the two storey workshop building. Initially, timber and corrugated iron sheds were built, however, these were soon replaced with more substantial masonry building. Gable-ended locomotive and carriage workshops were built here. Although no architectural drawings of these buildings have been located it is assumed that metal roof trusses and cast iron internal columns were used, similar to the structural system favoured in England, and later employed at Eveleigh. Of these sheds, the most elaborate was the Second Goods Shed, built in the late 1860s. The building was as, if not more, elaborate than many English examples. It was unusual, even in the 19th century, for this level of decorative detail to be employed on such a utilitarian structure as a goods shed, the standard of building obviously representing the level of importance of the yard.

Extensive facilities were required to keep the locomotives in good working order. The Sydney/Redfern yards were extended towards Elizabeth Street and the Exhibition Ground (Prince Alfred Park). Until the construction of the railway workshops at Eveleigh in the mid-1880s the majority of the maintenance work was undertaken at the Sydney/Redfern Yard. In 1884 the yards included a gasworks (c. 1882), gas holder, a carriage works and the locomotive shop (by 1865). A turntable connected the now considerably extended main workshop building, one of the two blacksmiths shops and the repairing shed. All of these structures have been demolished. Further towards the park, in the area now known as the Prince Alfred Sidings were located the carpenters shop, the second blacksmiths shop and an office. These buildings are the only remnants of the Sydney Yard. Little physical evidence remains of the layout or the functioning of this once extensive railway yard as many of the structures were removed to allow for the construction of platforms 16-23 and subsequently the city electric station.

=== Mortuary station ===
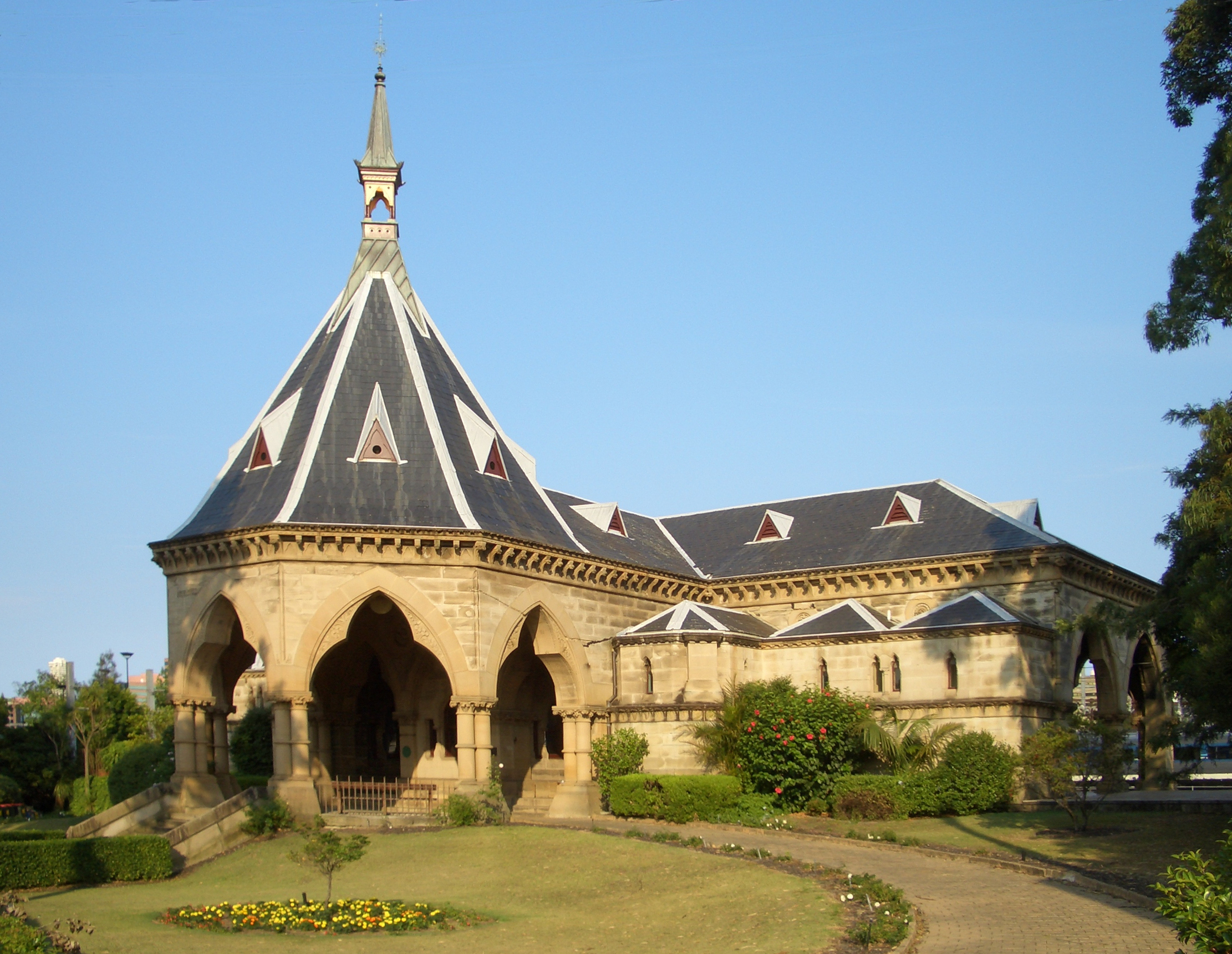
The Mortuary station viewed from Regent Street

The Mortuary station, or the Receiving House as it was known, was originally constructed for funeral parties, the mourners accompanying the coffin on the journey to the necropolis at Rookwood Cemetery. Most documentary sources date the building as being constructed in 1869, however, the outline of the station first appears on the 1865 MWS&DB (Metropolitan Water Sewerage & Drainage Board) plan. The rail lines had not yet been constructed. The inner Sydney cemetery or New Burial Ground, also known as the Sandhills or Devonshire Street station, was located in the Brickfields, a site now occupied by the main terminal building. By the 1840s this cemetery was overcrowded and a new location, in close proximity to a railway line, was required. In the early 1860s a site at Haslem's Creek was selected for the new cemetery. To distinguish the cemetery from the surrounding residential area of Haslem's Creek the cemetery became known as the Rookwood Necropolis. A station was constructed within the Rookwood Necropolis.

The Colonial Architect, James Barnet, designed both receiving houses (mortuary stations) in the mid 1860s. The station within the Necropolis has subsequently been relocated and modified to form the nave of All Saints Church of England, Ainslie, ACT. Although both stations are Gothic Revival in style, the plan and detailing of each varies considerably. Barnet's two station buildings were designed to celebrate the passage of the coffin to and from the train. In the Victorian Era, mourning the dead was a prolonged ritual with elaborate rules concerning behaviour and dress. The train trip to Rookwood became part of this ritual.

The regular funerary train service to the Rookwood Necropolis commenced in 1867, two years before Mortuary Central and the Rookwood Station had been completed. By 1908 there were four stations within the necropolis, named Mortuary Stations 1-4, with the Sydney receiving house being known as Mortuary Central. Mortuary Central was built by Stoddart & Medway from Pyrmont sandstone and completed in March 1869. The carvings were executed by Thomas Duckett and Henry Apperly. From the variation claim submitted by the builders it would appear that a slightly larger building, with more decoration was built than originally intended. The form of the Mortuary Station, with the large porte-cochère, clearly indicates that it is not a church. A colonnade of trefoil arches and foliated capitals forms a screen to the platform. The same arch form being employed for both ends of the platform and for the octagonal porte-cochère to the west. The station building is above street level, with a flight of stairs leading to the platform level. Ramps to the north and south were used for carriages. Internally were the ticket office, two vestibules and retiring rooms.

Photographs taken in the early 1870s clearly show the decorative detail of the building. Two colours of stone were employed, a darker shade of the arches and the surrounds to the medallions, the lighter shade being reserved for the ashlar work. The two shades of stone were employed internally in the same manner. The arcade covering the platform is very elaborate, with its curved queen post truss roof, with ripple iron above following the curve, blind arcading to the west that mirrors the eastern arcade, and geometric tiled floor. Even the platform benches follow the Gothic Revival theme of the design, resembling pews. This platform would have contrasted with the more utilitarian Redfern station building, designed by John Whitton and constructed in the early 1870s.

The stonework of the Mortuary Station was very delicately worked, with a number of different foliage motifs forming the capitals, the trefoil spandrel panel within the main arches and the medallions. A star and zig-zag motif was used on the soffit of the arch, ball flowers on the cornice brackets and a zig-zag on the cornice. The original roof covering was slate, with a pattern of half round and diamond slates being employed at the ridge and above the eaves. The octagonal porte-cochère terminates in a bell-cote, whose detail is a miniature of the main trefoil arch and medallion motif. The bellcote was roofed with lead. Decorative metalwork is also employed, as finals, as a cresting and as balustrades. A leaf motif was used for the balustrade to the porte-cochère and repeated in the panels of the elaborate timber gates that lead to the platform. A palisade fence that stepped down to follow the slope and matching gates separated the station from the street and a picket fence lined the ramps. The spire of Mortuary Station (the Bellcote) was a distinctive townscape element that could be seen from the Exhibition Grounds (Prince Alfred Park) and from Sydney University.

The arcade detail of Mortuary Central, with its pointed trefoil arches, medallions and foliated capitals, is reminiscent of the hotel at St Pancras Station by Sir George Gilbert Scott, designed in 1865 and constructed in 1868–73. There are few other station buildings, either in Australia or the United Kingdom, with this level of decorative detail. The construction of special mortuary stations is rare, with no other examples having been located. The Mortuary station became part of the rail complex at Central after the new station was constructed in 1906, although it remained physically separate from the new station buildings.

By the late 1970s, the station had deteriorated, slates were missing from the roof and the stonework was covered in graffiti. A restoration program was undertaken in 1983.

=== Railway Institute ===
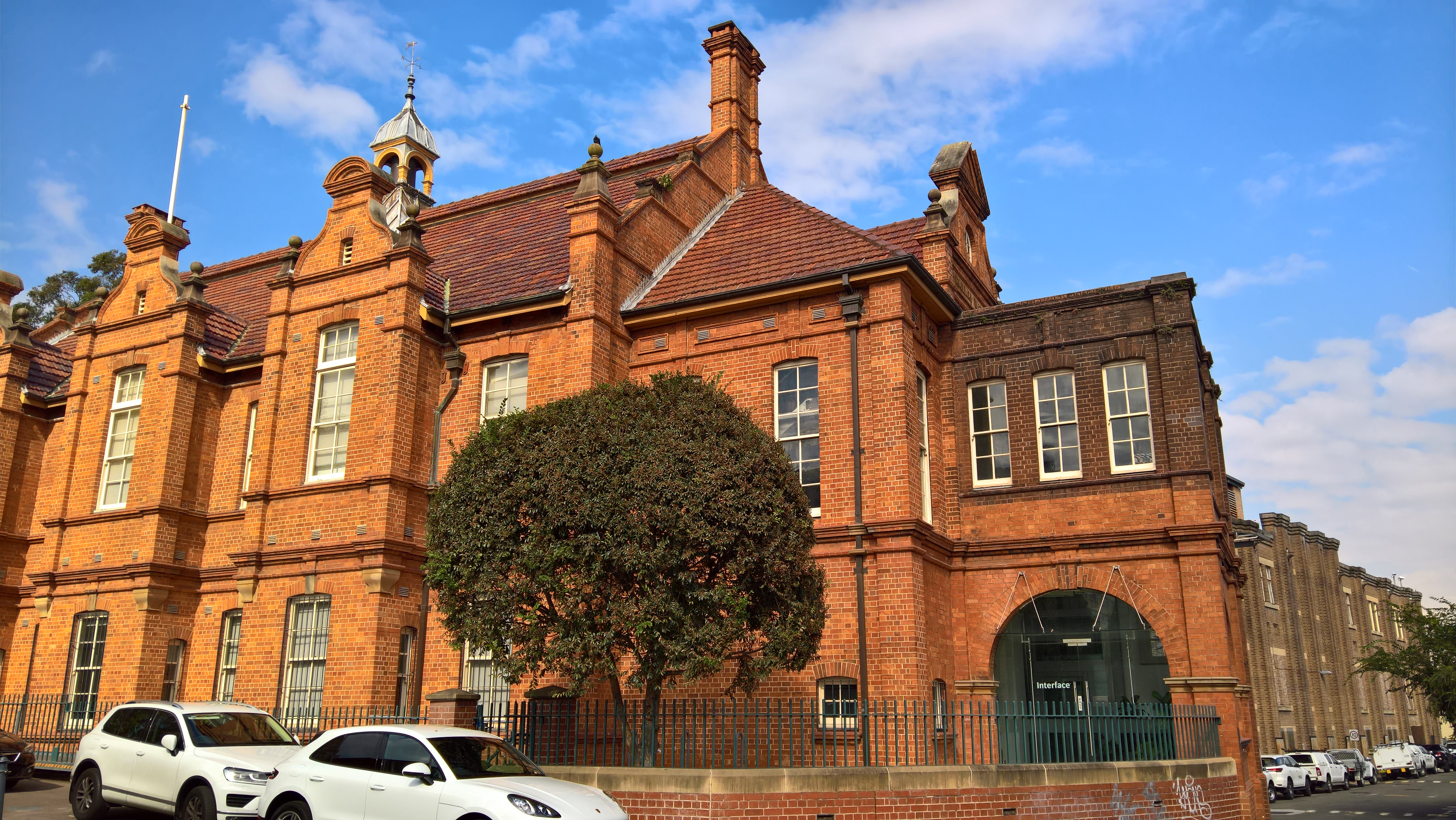
The Railway Institute Building on Chalmers Street

The Railway Institute on Chalmers Street was constructed as a venue for the railway employees, providing a setting for both educational activities and social functions. It is reputed to be the first railway institute in Australia and provided a range of services for railway employees such as evening classes and a library. A competition was held for the design, which was won by the architect Henry Robinson. It is a Queen Anne Revival style building, based on English prototypes such as the London Board Schools. The design was the first use of Marseille roof tiles for public buildings in Australia. Many public buildings were designed by competition c. 1890, during the period of transition between the Colonial and Government Architects Offices. The practice was abandoned in the mid-1890s due to the partiality of the judges.

When the Railway Institute was constructed in 1891, the building was located on the corner of Devonshire Street and Elizabeth Street, at the northeastern corner of the Sydney rail yard. The surrounding streets and the carriage way have subsequently been modified. A carriage-way lead to the porte-cochère, enabling people attending social functions to enter the building without getting wet. In addition to the library there were two halls, a large hall, with a stage, and a smaller hall on the ground floor. The detail of this space is largely intact and there are few examples of small scale halls of this period remaining in Sydney. A single-storey addition to the building, designed by the government architect, Walter Liberty Vernon, was added in 1898 to the southeast of the main building.

Classes, such as engineering drafting, and examinations for railway employees, were held in the institute. The building was also utilised during emergencies such as the 1919 influenza epidemic when women volunteers manufactured face masks (for railway employees). There are few examples of Institutes of this period that provided such a high level of facilities for the benefit of the employees. The names on the honour board reads as a "who's who" of railway personalities.

=== Fire and renovation ===
In May 2023, there was a large fire across the road from the Central Station upgrade works. The fire caused significant damage, including from water, to the new Sydney metro station entrance. The station entrance was repaired and was eventually reopened in November 2023.

== Station layout ==
Central Railway Station has buildings concentrated on its northern boundaries that are fed by large rail yards behind. Together they form part of the fabric of the city of Sydney and form boundaries to its inner suburbs. The location of this station is on land that has been in continuous government use since the commencement of European settlement. Various forms of public transport have radiated from this site since 1855.

=== Sydney Terminal building ===
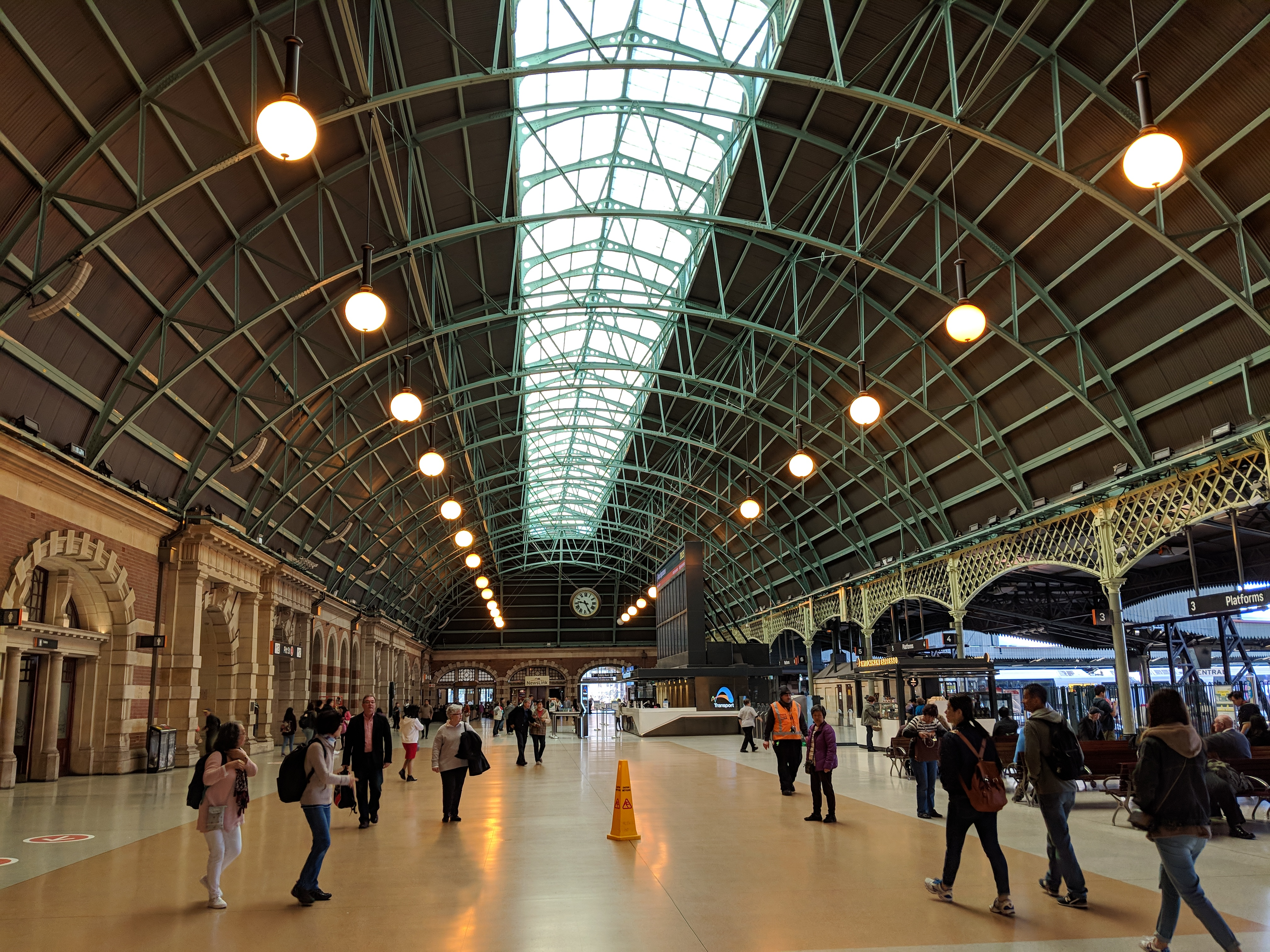
Eastward view of the Grand Concourse

The most prominent part of Sydney Central Station, visible from many parts of the City and surrounding area, is the 1906 sandstone main terminal building, referred to as the "Sydney Terminal Building" by railway staff. It is sited to dominate its surroundings and to mark the importance of the railways and its service to the state and the city.

The main concourse and platforms are elevated above the surrounding roads. This elevated siting also permits the use of the topography to gain road access to more than one level enabling the development of an extensive subterranean luggage network and separation of differing modes of transport. The commanding position of the Terminus with large areas of open space sloping away from the building continues the public domain of Railway Square whilst maintaining a clear vista of the Terminus from the surrounding area. The Terminus, and in part the Parcels Post Office, create a formal edge to Railway Square.

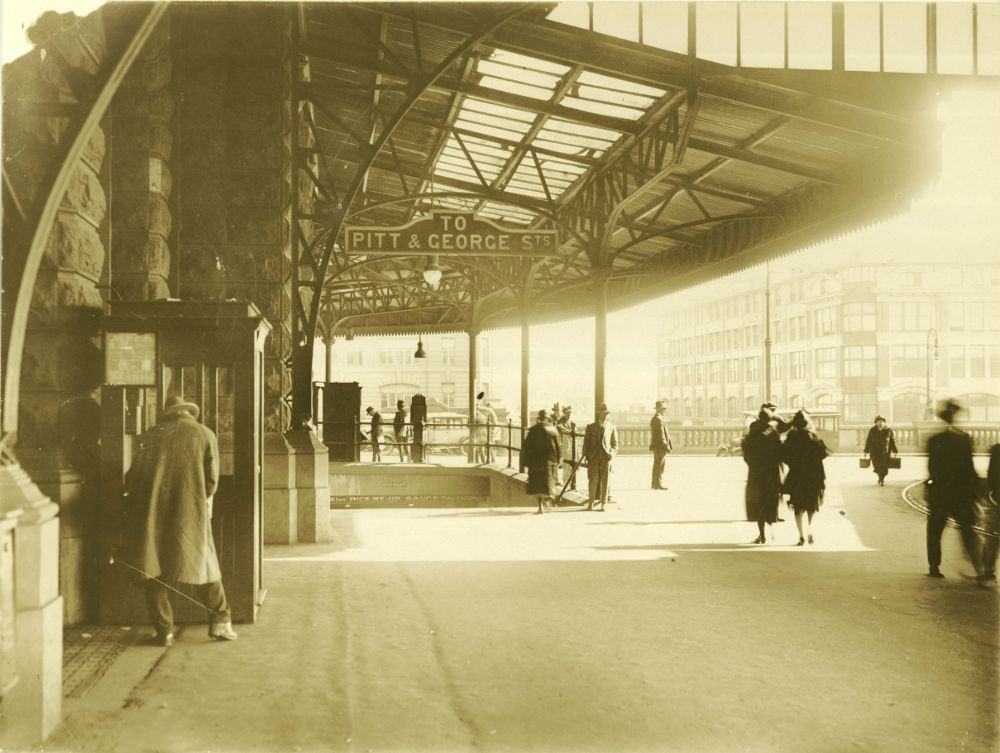
Western end of the colonnade and tram stop, with the porte-cochère in the background, 1924

On the main Eddy Avenue façade, the Terminus comprises a colonnade and porte-cochère, which originally provided an undercover area for passengers transferring to and from trams. After the removal of the original Sydney tram network, the upper level colonnade was used by motor vehicles, but it is now again used by trams on the Inner West Light Rail.

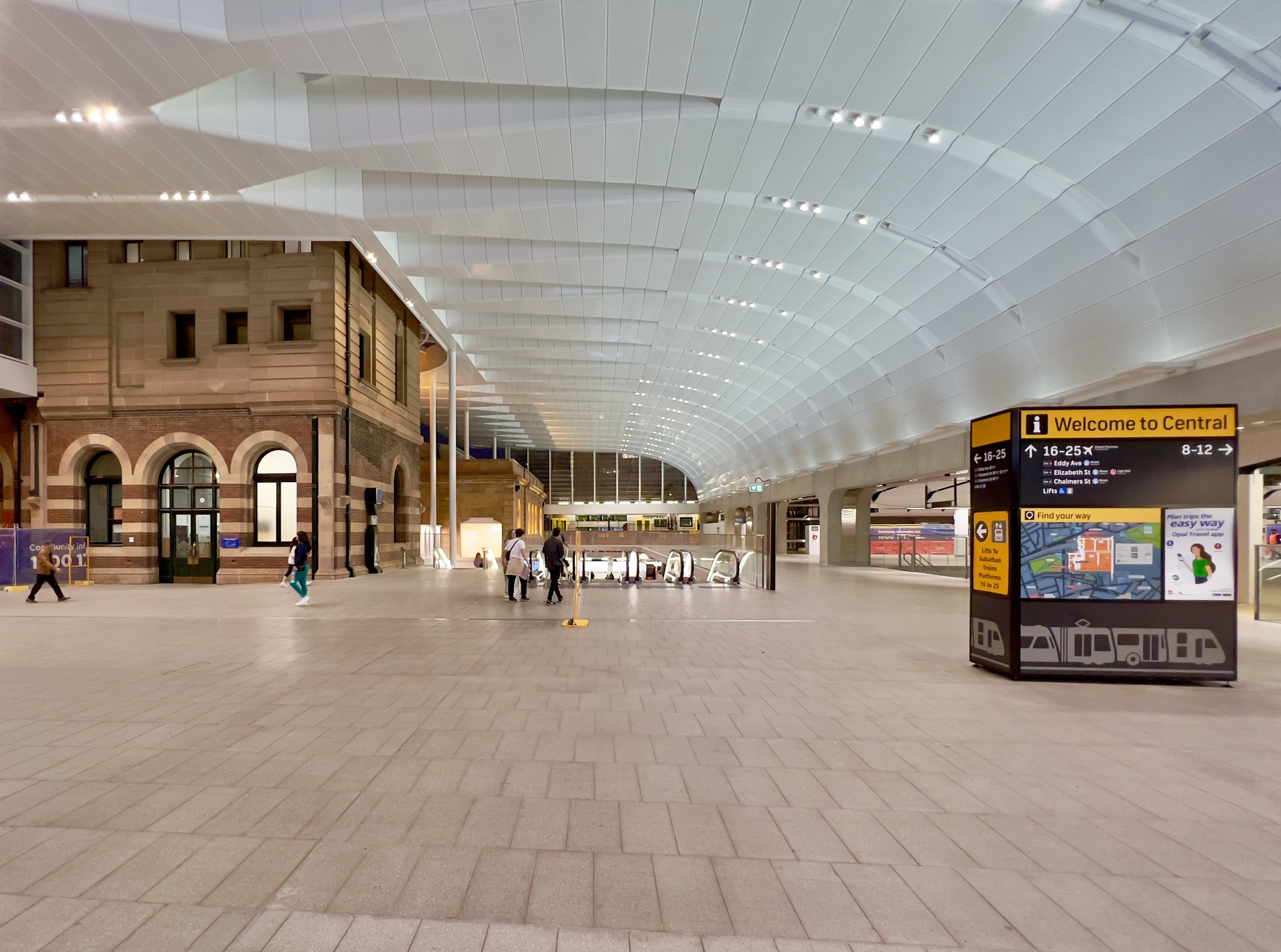
Northern Concourse

The main concourse, originally called the "Main Assembly platform" and today known as the "Grand Concourse", is located on the upper level and is the centre of the Terminus, around which all of the ancillary functions, such as refreshment rooms, waiting rooms and the booking hall, were arranged. As originally built, the main terminal building also had terraces or "decks" on the east and west sides, which were accessible by vehicles. The main concourse "platform" was accessed from both the East and West deck. The main concourse is dominated by a large vaulted roof over the concourse and elaborate masonry, primarily Sydney sandstone.

The station opened on 5 August 1906 with 11 platforms, but was soon expanded to 15, and by 1913 had 19. As part of the construction of the electrified city railway in the 1920s, the existing station was cut back to 15 platforms with new platforms built to the east of the existing station. As part of the project, platforms 10 to 15 were electrified, with platforms 1 to 9 following in 1956.

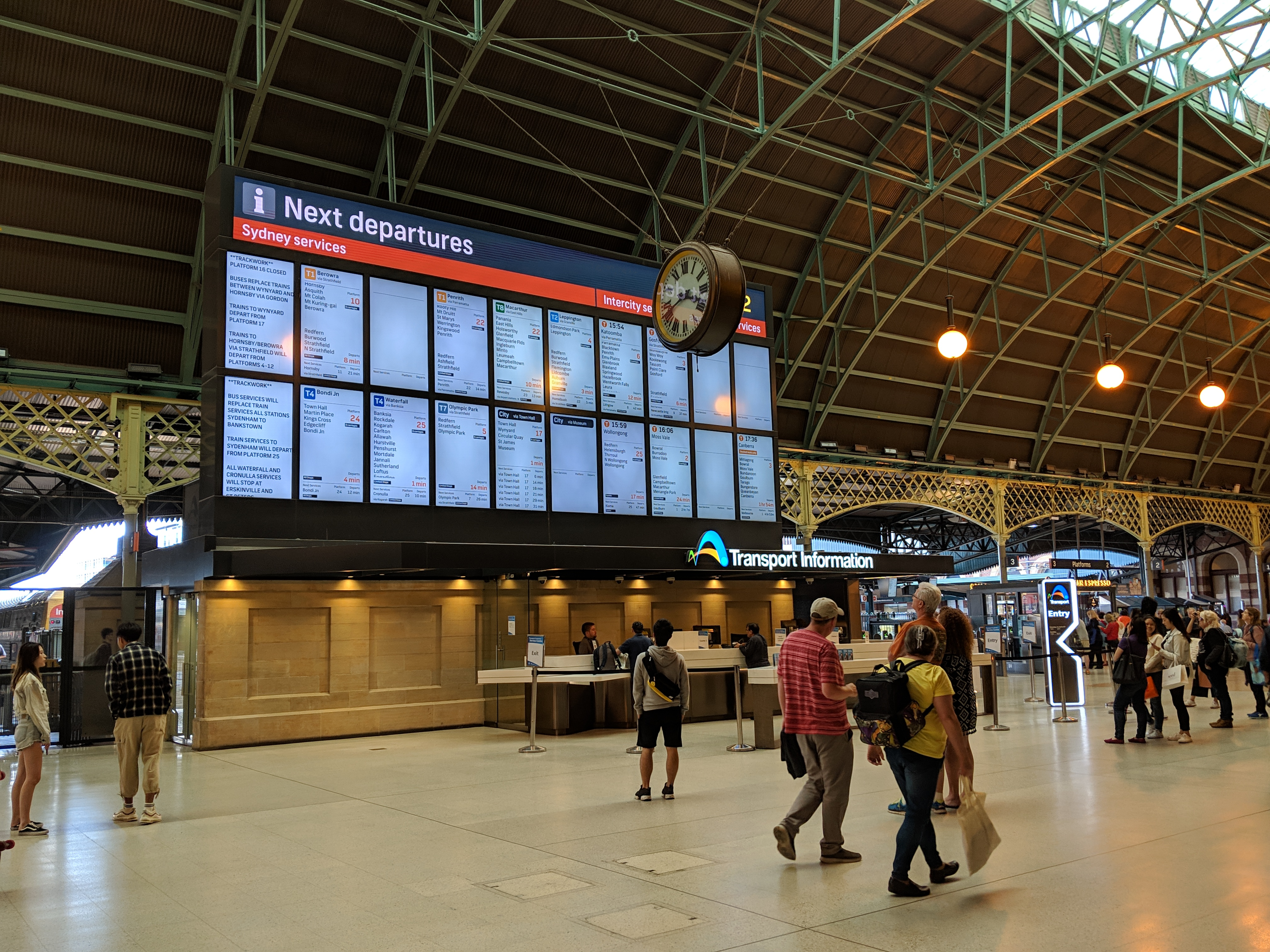
Grand Concourse departures board and information stand

The current 15 Sydney Terminal platforms run perpendicular to the main station concourse and all are dead ended with the buffer stop. They are arranged as seven double platforms and one single platform, each with an awning, servicing a total of 15 tracks. Platforms 1–3 are for country and interstate services, while the remainder are for interurban services.

Platforms 1–10 have a centre run-round track, which was for locomotive-hauled trains. It enabled the locomotive to uncouple from its train and either depart or re-couple on the other end to pull the train to the next destination. There was extreme pressure on the speed to ready a train for the next destination due to the lack of platform space and a steady growth of rail patronage. Some of these centre lines are now used for storage of electric rail car sets in off peak times, while has been closed since renovations. The platforms feature long timber-framed canopies over some of the platforms (incorporating Howe trusses). Timber was used in lieu of steel because of the high cost at the time of importing steel.

The only locomotive hauled trains now using Sydney Terminal are the Indian Pacific and special trains which usually use Platform 1. Platform 1 has always been the main out of Sydney Station with the longest platform. Platforms 1 and 2–3 were lengthened to their present length in 1962 covering the skylights to the Devonshire Street Subway for diesel hauled trains like the Southern Aurora. All long-distance NSW TrainLink XPT and Xplorer services and the Great Southern Rail Indian Pacific terminate at Central. These generally use Platforms 1 to 3, although when the Indian Pacific is in the station occupying both Platforms 2 and 3, some NSW TrainLink regional services use Platforms 4 to 12.

=== Central Electric Station ===
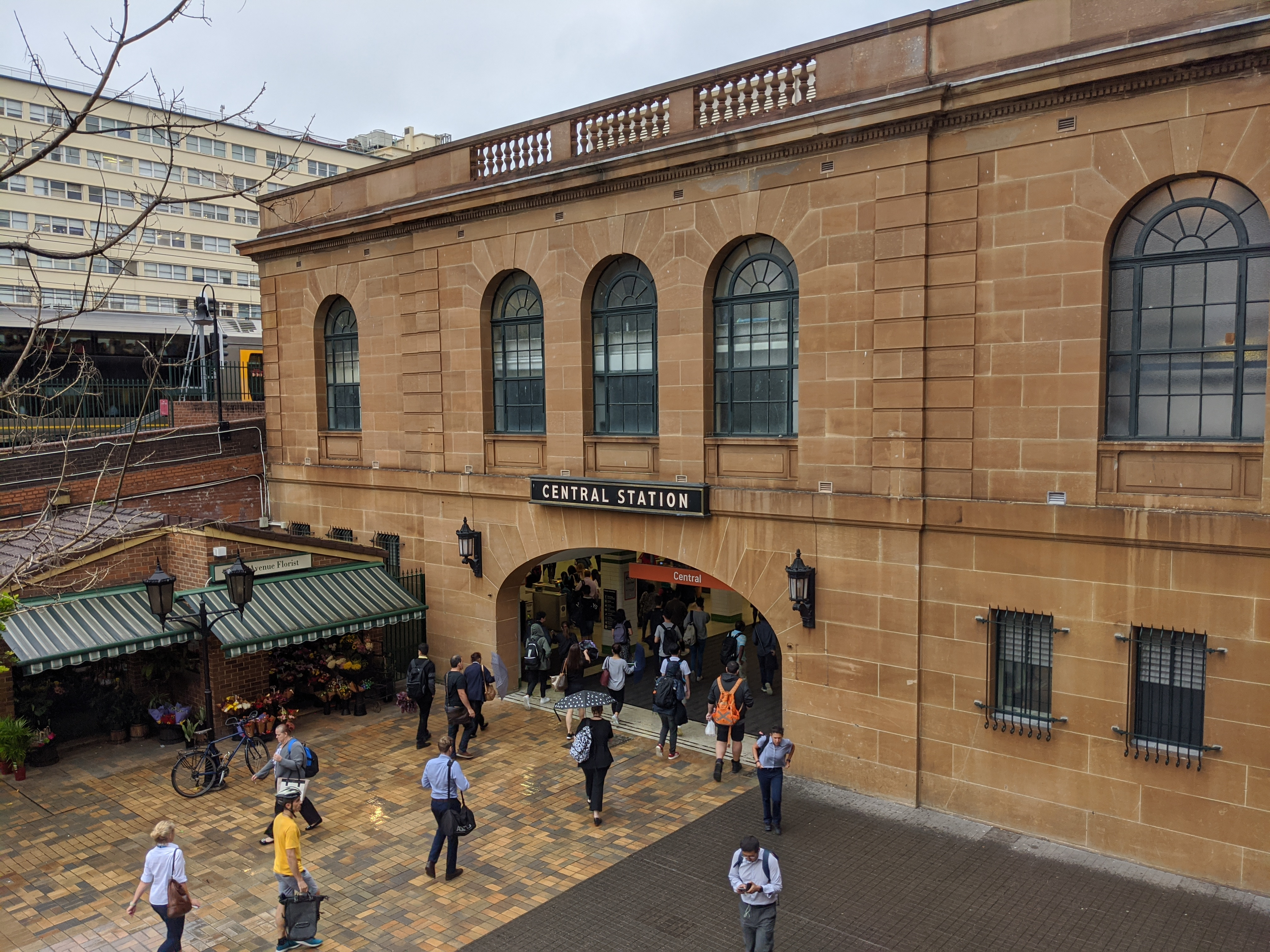
Eddy Avenue entrance to the suburban platforms

To the east of the Sydney Terminal building are ten further platforms, used by suburban Sydney Trains services and by a limited number of NSW TrainLink intercity services during peak hours.

As part of the construction of the electrified city railway in the 1920s and the electrification and expansions of the Sydney suburban lines, the existing station was cut back to 15 platforms with new Platforms 16 to 23 built on the station's eastern side in 1926. The Electric Station was part of the construction works overseen by Bradfield that included the excavation of the tunnels, the building of the Harbour Bridge, and electrification of the suburban rail network.

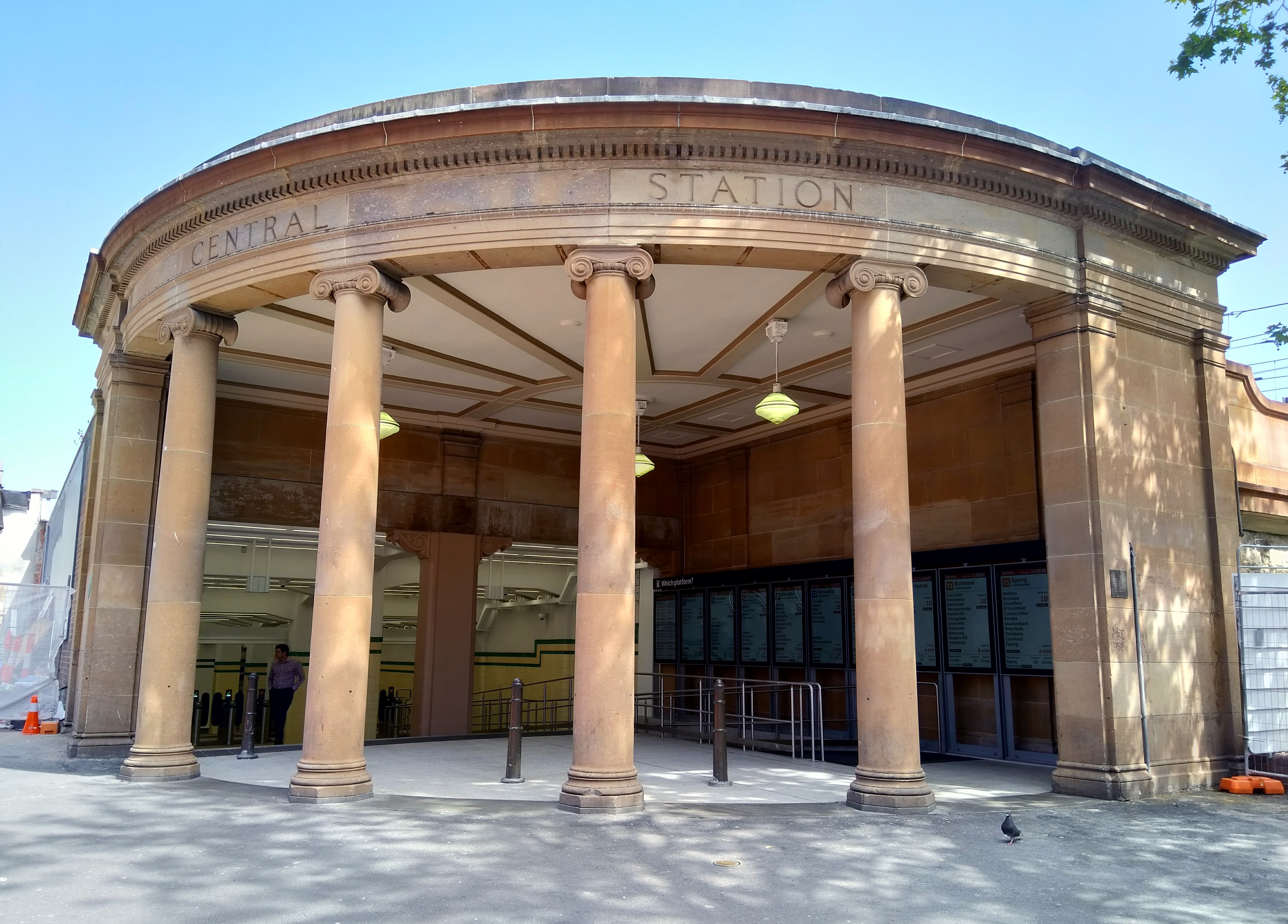
The eastern entrance to the station from Chalmers and Foveaux Streets

The platforms continue north via a six-track viaduct paralleling Elizabeth Street built to the north, passing over Campbell Street and Hay Street, and ending at Goulburn Street where it enters tunnels to connect with the City Circle underground rail system and the North Shore over the Sydney Harbour Bridge.

Platforms 16 to 23 are also elevated, but are served by a lower level concourse at street level known as "North Concourse". Railway staff refer to this part of the station as the "Central Electric Station", or "Central Electric System". The two stations were managed and staffed as separate entities. This section of the station is also referred to as the "suburban" platforms. There are two major pedestrian entrances to Central Electric: one at Elizabeth Street and one at the top of Eddy Avenue ramp. Both are constructed of Maroubra sandstone with classical detailing.

The four island platforms allow eight trains to use the station, four trains in each direction. South of these new platforms, a series of flying junctions were built. This involved the four southbound tracks passing beneath the northbound tracks with a series of diamond crossings allowing trains to cross lines without impeding trains traveling in the opposite direction.

In February 1926, Platforms 18 and 19 of the steam station were wired for electric trains with a demonstration run from Sydney to Hurstville. This wiring was transferred to Platforms 21 and 23 and Platforms 14 and 15 were wired for Bankstown electric train services commencing October 1926 and later worked into St James. As the Homebush electrification was completed, Platforms 17 and 18 were wired. Electric trains to Hornsby via the main line commenced on 21 January 1929. Trains to Hornsby used Platforms 16 and 18. Steam services to Parramatta and Liverpool were converted to electric in November 1929. Western electric trains began operating through to Wynyard from 28 February 1932.

Two further underground platforms were built as part of the Eastern Suburbs Railway, bringing the total number of platforms in the suburban section to ten. Construction commenced in 1948 but the line was not finished until 1979. While the plans called for four platforms, two (for the Southern Suburbs line) were intended to be used in the future and have never been brought into service. They were for a time used for archival storage by the railways.

=== Metro platforms and Central Walk ===
Construction began in 2018 on two new underground platforms as part of the Sydney Metro City & Southwest project, and a new landmark underground concourse called Central Walk, which connects the suburban, intercity and metro platforms.

Central Walk in December 2023

Central Walk was partially opened in November 2022 and was fully opened in April 2023. Central Walk provides lift and escalator access to the suburban platforms, which previously had only lift and stair access.

The metro platforms were built beneath Platforms 13 and 14, which were closed for the duration of construction. In November and December 2018, Platforms 12-13 and 14-15 were demolished. A temporary Platform 12 was erected in January 2019. The metro platforms opened on 19 August 2024. From opening, the 45-metre (148 ft) long and 27-metre (89 ft) tall escalators between Central Walk and the metro platforms are the longest in the southern hemisphere, overtaking the previous record of 35-metre (115 ft) long escalators at Perth's Airport Central railway station.

=== Indicator board ===
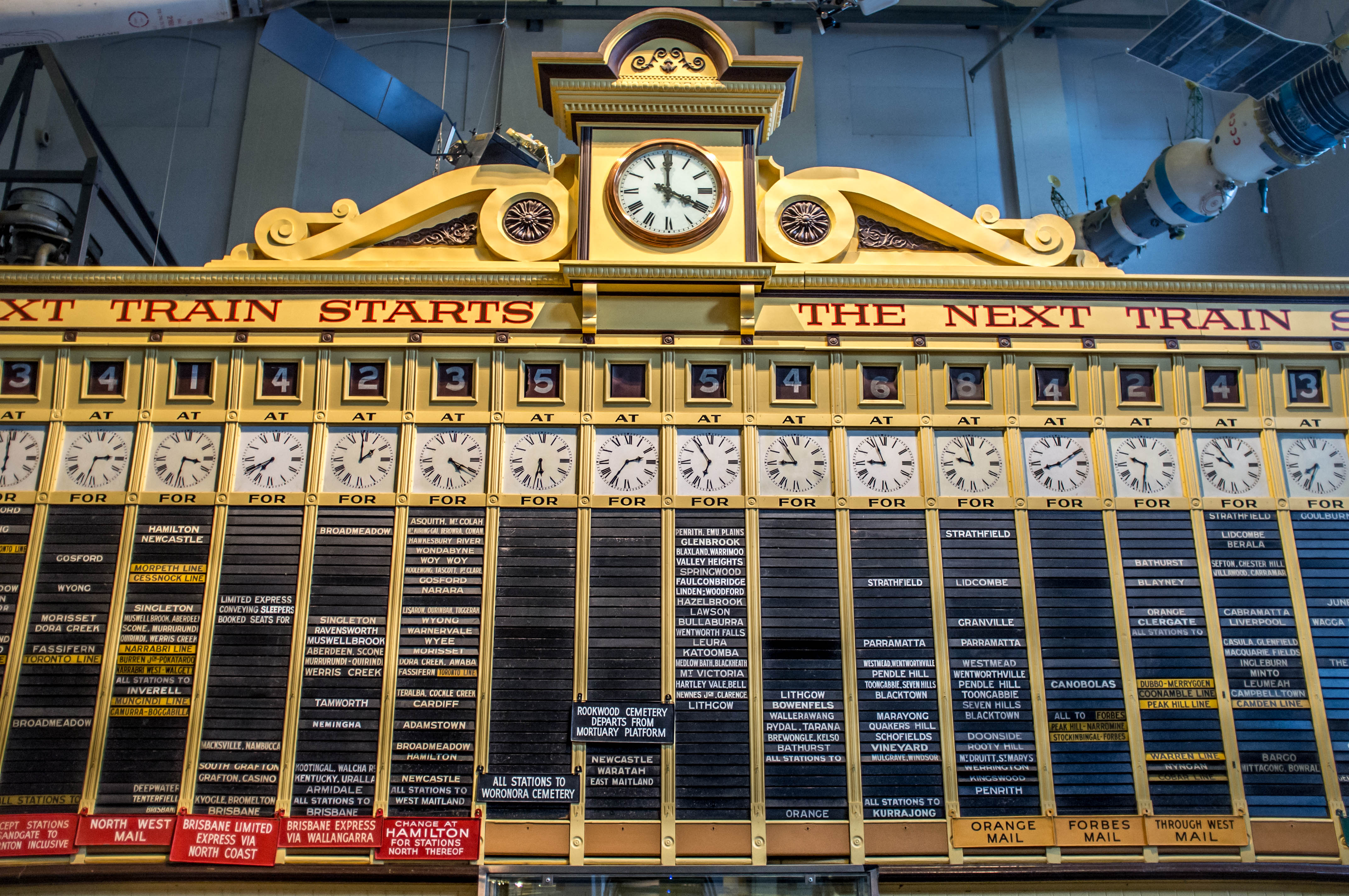
1906 Central station Indicator Board on display at the Powerhouse Museum in Ultimo

When opened, Central station had an indicator board with 22 vertical panels. It was replaced in June 1982 by computer screens with the original indicator board conserved by the Powerhouse Museum. In June 2015, a new elevated 11-metre-long (36 ft) indicator board was installed on the main concourse on the same sandstone base as the original board.

=== Devonshire Street Tunnel ===
After Central was built in 1906, Devonshire Street, to the north of the old station, became an underpass, now called the Devonshire Street Tunnel or Devonshire Street Subway. The underpass allows pedestrians to access the eastern "suburban" section from Railway Square and Chalmers Street. To the west, the tunnel continues under Railway Square and connects to The Goods Line – the former Darling Harbour railway line which has been converted to a park and pedestrian pathway to Ultimo and Darling Harbour.

=== Railway Square ===
The western side of the Sydney Terminal building leads down to Railway Square, originally Central Square, at the junction of George and Pitt streets. Although Railway Square no longer signifies the entrance to the interior of the colony, it has always channelled traffic from the southern parts of the city and out west to Parramatta. From the building of the first railway terminus at Devonshire Street in 1855, it was an important focus for the arrival of country persons to the city and later commuters into the city.

The importance of the relationship between the Sydney Terminus and Railway Square is reflected in the elevations of the main building. Here the dominating presence of the clock tower, completed in 1921, marked the arrival and departure times, the beginning and end of a workman's day. Before the spread of the suburbs, a workman could make a return trip home to eat dinner in his lunch hour.

=== Parcel Office building ===
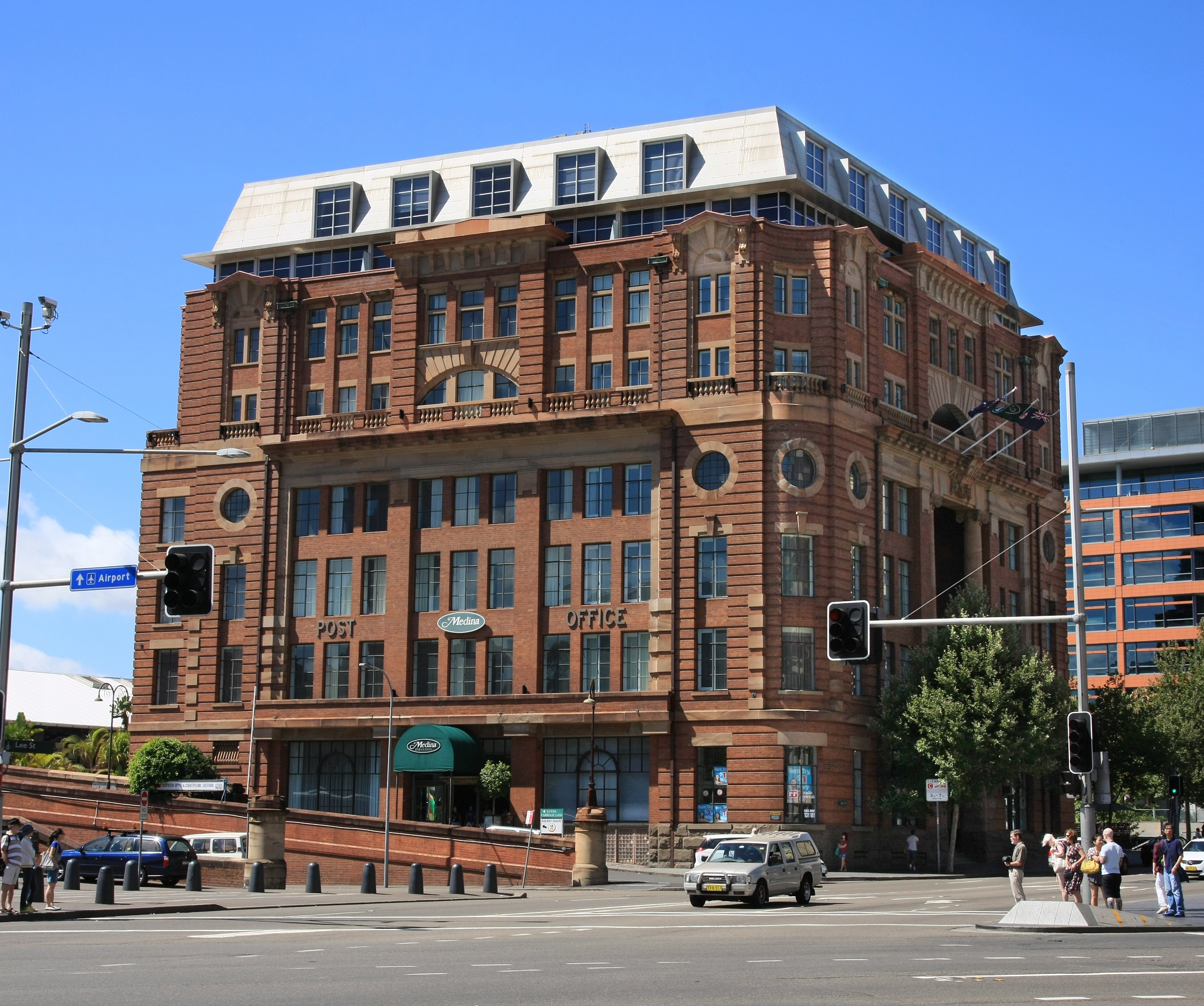
The former Parcel Office Building now located on the edge of Railway Square

To the west of the southern end of Platform 1 is the Inwards Parcel Office. This was the loading dock for parcels and mail from the post office. The mail was loaded via a tunnel from the post office. The Parcels Post Office is an unusual urban building, being designed to be viewed from three sides. Its symmetrical, boldly modelled elevations and its siting in the middle of an open space give it the presence of a public monument or sculpture. Due to the oblique road approaches to the Railway Square this building forms a strong element within the Sydney Terminal Precinct.

The Parcel Office building is now an apartment-hotel, managed by Adina.

=== Sydney Yards ===
South of the Devonshire Street Tunnel, a large rail yard extends to the Cleveland Street Bridge, linking the Sydney Terminal platforms (1–15) with the railway lines extending west. The track layout to Platforms 1–15 have remained virtually unchanged since they were originally laid out in 1906. Major items from its period as a steam locomotive hauled train yard have been removed. These include the Eastern Carriage shed demolished in 1986, Coal Stages, and Engine Docks at the head of each platform. Ash pits and water columns that were part of the yard have also been removed. There is only one "yard controller" remaining within the Yard. Previously, at least two Signal Boxes would have been located in the Yard at any one time, but these have been removed due to the mechanical interlocking system being computerised and pneumatically operated.

The Yard buildings have been altered significantly since the Eastern Carriage Shed was demolished. This large shed divided the central yard from the central electric lines. The land where the shed once stood lay vacant until the construction projects begun in 2018. Remaining structures signifying the division of the yard are the Cleaners Amenities and the former Timetable Office with the garden. The Rail Yard connects to the passenger platforms of Sydney Terminal which are as originally designed and built, with the infrastructure for steam locomotives having been removed - these being water columns between each track near the buffers. However, the concrete plinths remain.

The open space of the rail yards adds to the experience of arrival to the city from the north and south by opening up vistas to the imposing Sydney Terminal with its landmark tower. This open space permits the imposing Terminus and its Tower to be visible when viewed from a distance much as it was intended when originally built. The Terminus and its approaches define formal urban spaces in the city fabric.

=== Western Yard ===
The Western Rail Yard lies west of the westernmost main line track leading to Platform 1 (No. 1 Main Line), and extends to the Regent Street boundary to the west, Devonshire Street Subway to the north and Cleveland Street Bridge to the south. Until the construction project begun in 2018, the track layout of this yard had remained virtually unchanged since 1906. The rail sidings that take up the bulk of the land area were known as the "Botany Road Yards". These siding lines are still in service but are seldom used. The lines were used as storage yards for making up passenger trains and for goods being loaded and unloaded at the Parcel and Goods Sidings. This was a major activity at the Sydney Terminal that has become obsolete due to the introduction of technological changes such as fixed sets of rail cars, and the phasing out of locomotive-pulled trains. The Darling Harbour Line branch line formerly cut through the precinct providing access to Darling Harbour Goods Yard. This is no longer in use, and part of the former line is now the Goods Line, a lineal park connected to Devonshire Street Tunnel.

The underpass and overbridge date from 1855. The Mortuary Station with its siding and platform is on the boundary of this rail yard, facing Regent Street, and is visible from Railway Square because of the low scale of buildings in the Western Yard. Rail access to the Mortuary Station was from the main lines near the Cleveland Street Bridge, and has remained in service since the mid-1860s.

Nearer to the present main station building were the West Carriage Shed, demolished in 1999. This was the last remaining carriage shed at Central Station. The six rail lines that enter the shed were connected to the yard through tunnels at the end of Platform 1.

The Yard was designed for locomotive-hauled trains. As this technology has gone out of use except for the Indian Pacific and Special Trains the yard has little present functional use. With locomotive hauled trains the trains were marshalled for running in one direction. It has the locomotive at the head of the train and a brake van near the rear. This meant that trains when ending their journey had to be remarshalled before commencing their journey out of Sydney Station. The introduction of trains with driving positions at both ends of the train no longer require this process. As the station originally handled locomotive hauled passenger trains for suburban, country and interstate service this activity was considerable. Most of the steam loco facilities and trackwork has been removed. The decline in shunting and the removal of coal and water storage has seen a reduction in the level of activity in the yard. Although it has progressed through various configurations, the landscape has maintained the same ground level since 1856 with its final layout being enlarged in 1906 by the removal of some houses and the realignment of Regent Street to its present format.

=== Parcel Dock ===
The Parcel Dock was physically connected with the main station complex and had four platforms (two dock platforms) for the use of mail trains. Due to the decline of parcel delivery by rail, this was cut back to serve a motorail loading ramp (for the loading of automobiles) for the Indian Pacific. The space where the mail sidings were is now a Youth Hostels Association hostel named the Sydney Railway Square YHA. The hostel rooms are modelled on old train carriages.

=== Former Prince Alfred Sidings ===
The Prince Alfred Sidings were formerly to the south of Platform 23 and on the eastern perimeter of the site, making up the boundary with Prince Alfred Park to the southeast. The Prince Alfred or "PA" electric car sidings were built only after the flyovers. Prior to the construction of the electric lines, the yard was a goods yard containing Produce and Goods Sheds as well as the first carriage shed. All have been removed from this precinct. The Yard is a small part of the original Sydney yard, of which a number of buildings remain which date from 1870. Later additional buildings are associated with the 1926 Electric Suburban System. The construction of the electric system reduced the width of the Prince Alfred Sidings, and trains within this yard needed to be protected because of vandalism. The Electric Sub Station is part of the 1926 electrification works and is linked with the sub station at the Sydney Harbour Bridge. It also contains air compressors for the operation of pneumatic points within the Yard and the City Circle Lines. A retaining wall forms the boundary with Prince Alfred Park; it has been incorporated into the rear wall of the blacksmiths workshops. A number of mature trees are growing on the boundary, the largest being a Moreton Bay Fig at least 80 years old.

The Prince Alfred sidings were closed in August 1995 and then demolished to make way for the Airport line, which enters a tunnel built into the retaining wall of Prince Alfred Park.

== Platforms ==
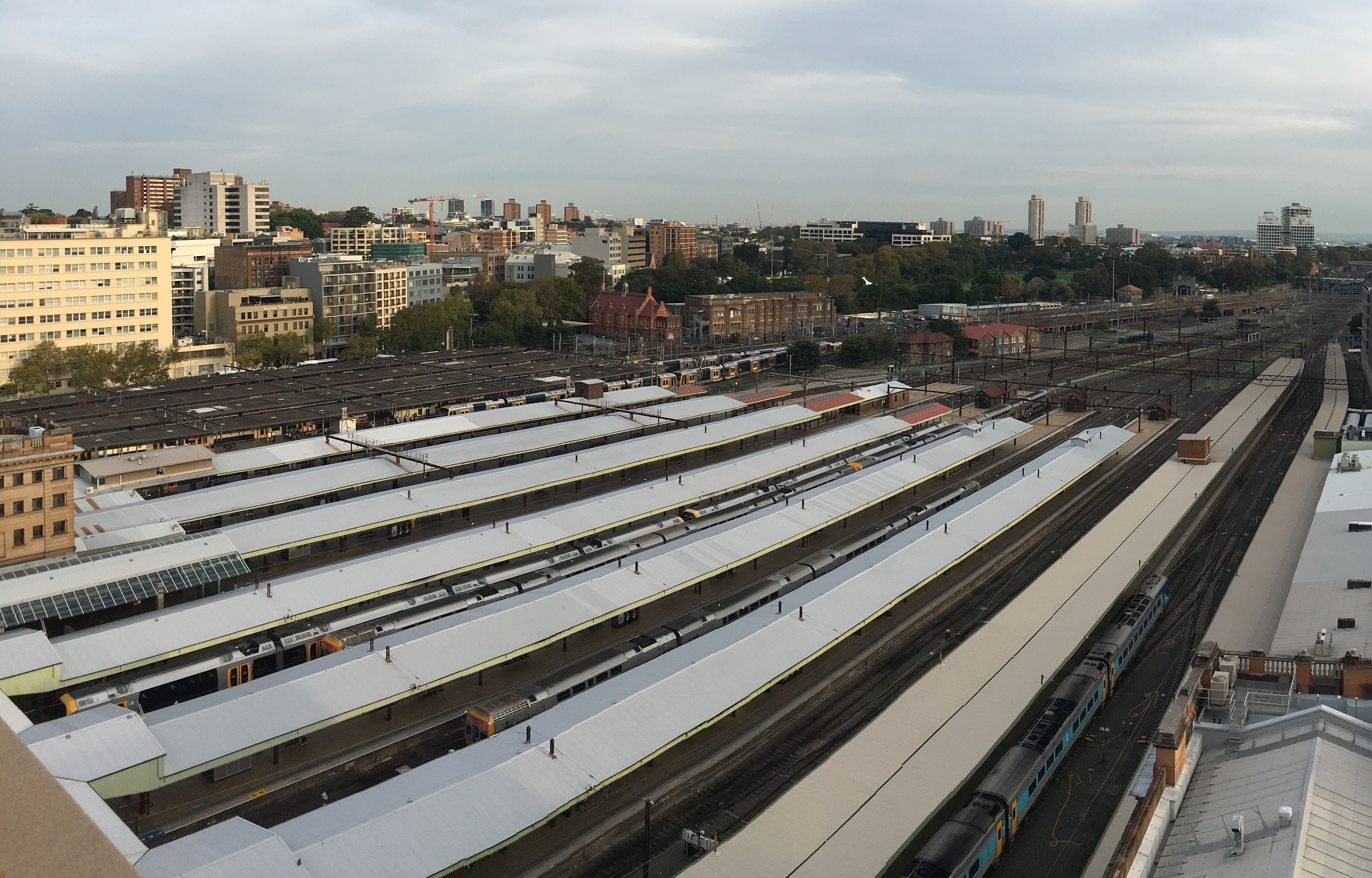
An aerial view of the above-ground platforms, April 2016; intercity and regional platforms are pictured in the foreground while suburban platforms are visible to the left in the background

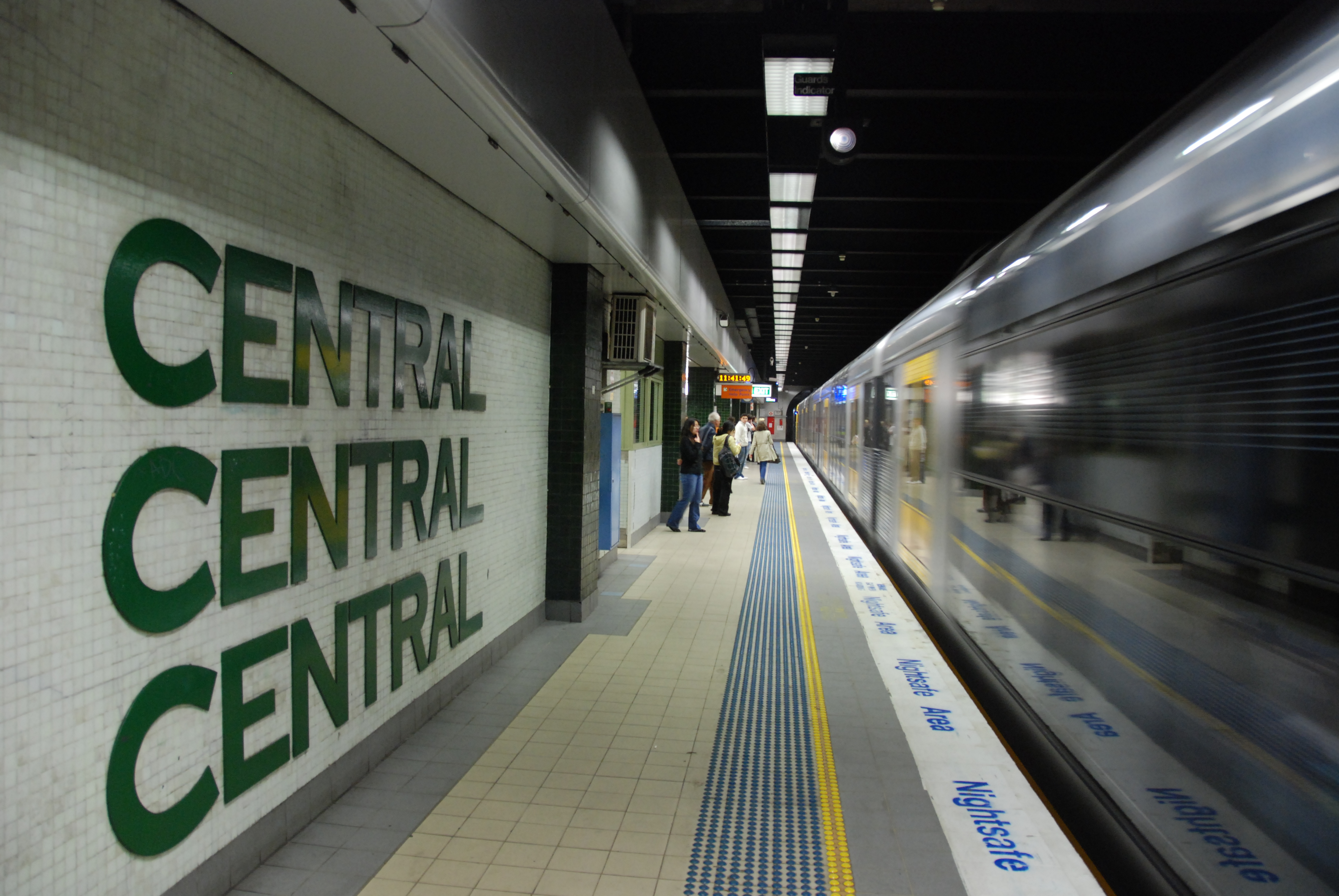
The underground platforms of 24 and 25, July 2008

Central serves all Sydney Trains suburban lines except for the T5 Cumberland Line and the T6 Lidcombe & Bankstown Line. The platforms are numbered from 1 to 25, with 1 being the westernmost platform and 25 being one of the easternmost. Platforms 1 to 14 are above ground terminating at the Sydney Terminal Building; Platforms 16 to 23 are above ground and serve the through-running suburban station to the east of the main building; Platforms 24 and 25 are underground and serve the Eastern Suburbs Railway; Platforms 26 and 27 serve the Metro North West & Bankstown Line and are located underground beneath Platforms 13 and 14.

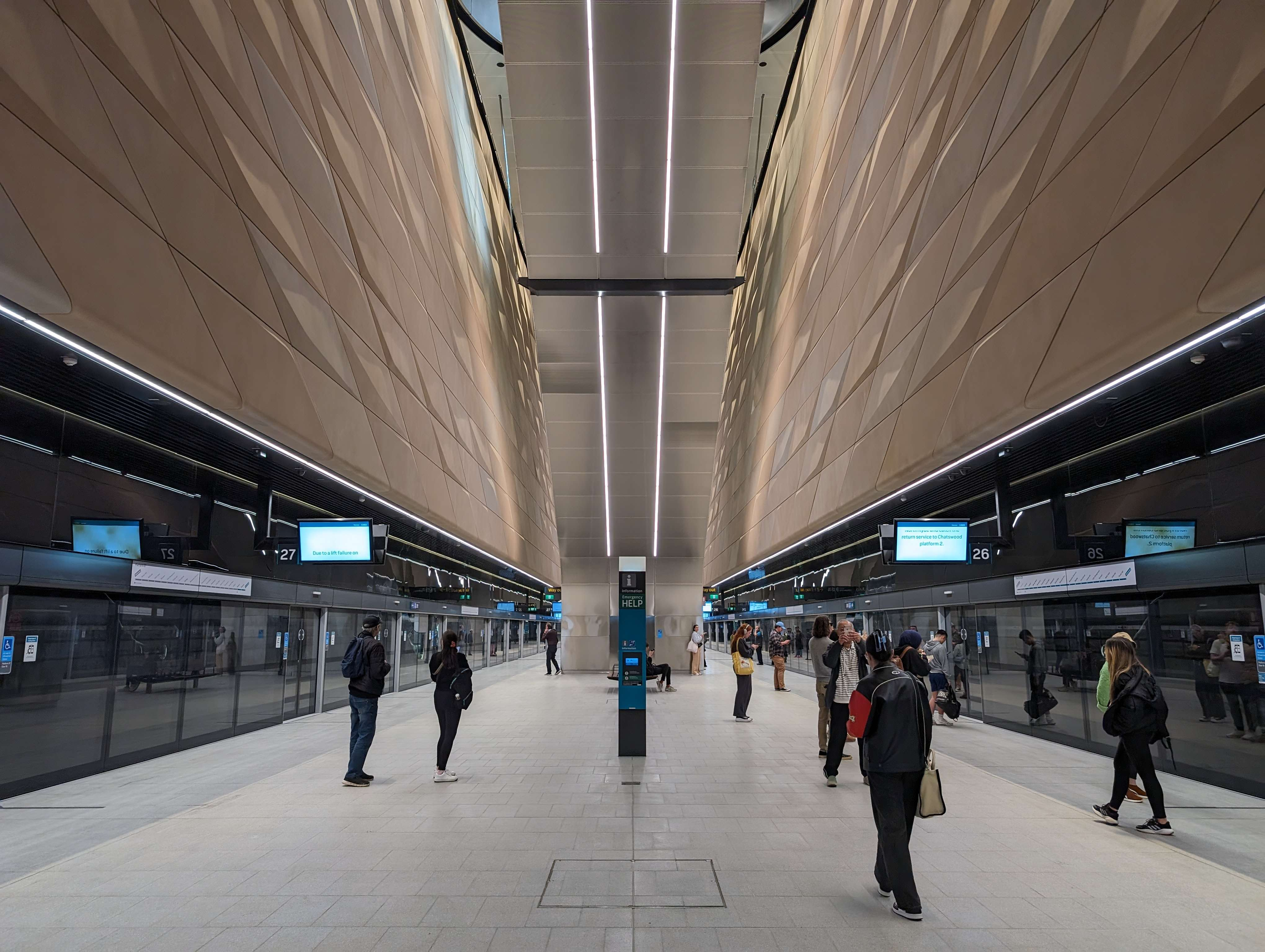
The underground Sydney Metro platforms 26 and 27, August 2024

The numbers for Platforms 26 and 27 formerly referred to never-completed "ghost platforms", formerly used for archival document storage and now contains Sydney Metro communications and power rooms. These platforms are located underground, above Platforms 24 and 25; all four platforms were constructed as part of the original vision for the Eastern Suburbs Railway. Platform 15 was permanently closed in September 2018 to facilitate Sydney Metro construction and the expansion of adjacent platforms.

Platform	Line	Stopping pattern	Notes
1 to 3	North Coast Region	Services to Casino & Brisbane	Platforms 1 to 14 are terminal platforms
1 to 3	North Western Region	Services to Armidale & Moree	
1 to 3	Southern Region	Services to Canberra, Griffith & Melbourne	
1 to 3	Western Region	Services to Dubbo & Broken Hill	
1 to 3	Indian Pacific	services to Adelaide & Perth	
4 to 14	Central Coast & Newcastle Line	Services to Gosford, Wyong & Newcastle via Strathfield	
4 to 14	Blue Mountains Line	Services to Springwood, Katoomba, Mount Victoria, Lithgow & Bathurst via Parramatta	
4 to 14	South Coast Line	Services to Wollongong, Dapto & Kiama via Wolli Creek	
4 to 14	Southern Highlands Line	Evening weekday peak hour and limited services to Moss Vale & Goulburn via Glenfield	
4 to 14	Olympic Park railway line	Special event services to Olympic Park	
4 to 14	T9 Northern Line	Morning & evening weekday peak hour services to Hornsby via Strathfield	
15	closed	rarely used in peak times in the heyday, stored 8 car V set at times	Permanently closed, replaced by expanded Platforms 13 to 14
16	T1 North Shore & Western Line	Services to Lindfield, Gordon, Hornsby & Berowra via Chatswood	
16	T9 Northern Line	Services to Gordon via Chatswood	
16	Central Coast & Newcastle Line	6 Evening peak hour services to Gosford & Wyong via Gordon	Continued from the terminated Sydney Trains T1 North Shore & Western Line service
17	T2 Leppington & Inner West Line	Services to the City Circle via Town Hall	
17	T3 Liverpool & Inner West Line	Services to the City Circle via Town Hall	
18	T1 North Shore & Western Line	Services to Penrith, Richmond & Emu Plains	
18	T1 North Shore & Western Line	6 Morning peak hour express services to Blacktown via Parramatta	Continued from the terminated Intercity Central Coast & Newcastle Line service
18	T9 Northern Line	Services to Epping & Hornsby via Strathfield	
19	T2 Leppington & Inner West Line	Services to Parramatta, Homebush & Leppington	
19	T3 Liverpool & Inner West Line	Services to Liverpool via Lidcombe and Regents Park	
20	T8 Airport & South Line	Services to the City Circle via Museum	
21	T8 Airport & South Line	Services to the City Circle via Museum	
22	T8 Airport & South Line	Services to Sydenham	
22	T8 Airport & South Line	Evening weekday peak hour services to Macarthur and Campbelltown via Sydenham	
23	T8 Airport & South Line	Services to Revesby & Macarthur via Airport stations	
24	T4 Eastern Suburbs & Illawarra Line	Services to Martin Place & Bondi Junction	
24	South Coast Line	Services to Bondi Junction	
25	T4 Eastern Suburbs & Illawarra Line	Services to Cronulla, Waterfall & Helensburgh	
25	South Coast Line	Services to Wollongong, Dapto & Kiama via Wolli Creek	
26	M1 Metro North West & Bankstown Line	Metro services to Tallawong	
27	M1 Metro North West & Bankstown Line	Metro services to Bankstown	

== Connecting services ==
=== Light rail ===
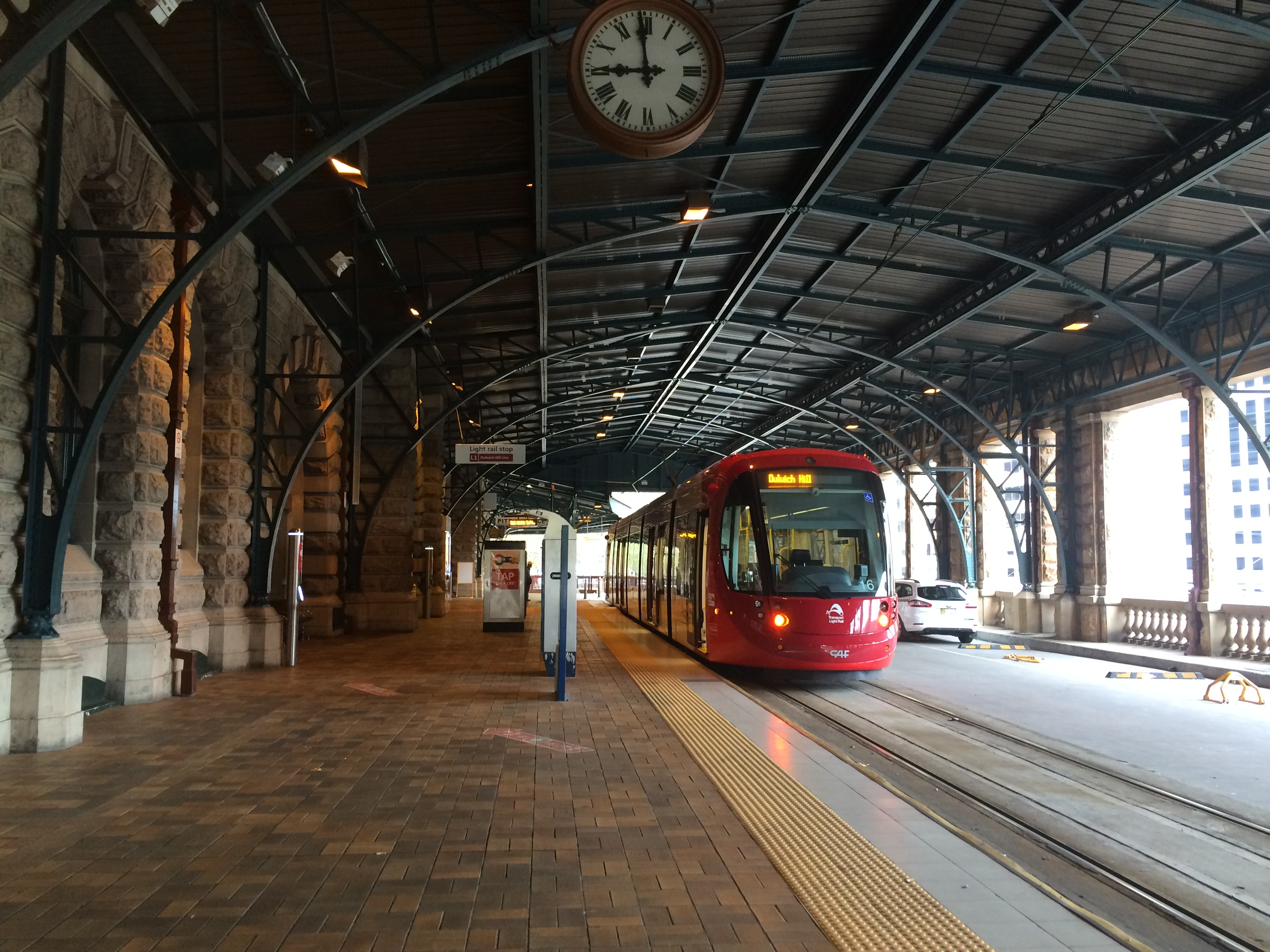
The Inner West Light Rail at Central Grand Concourse

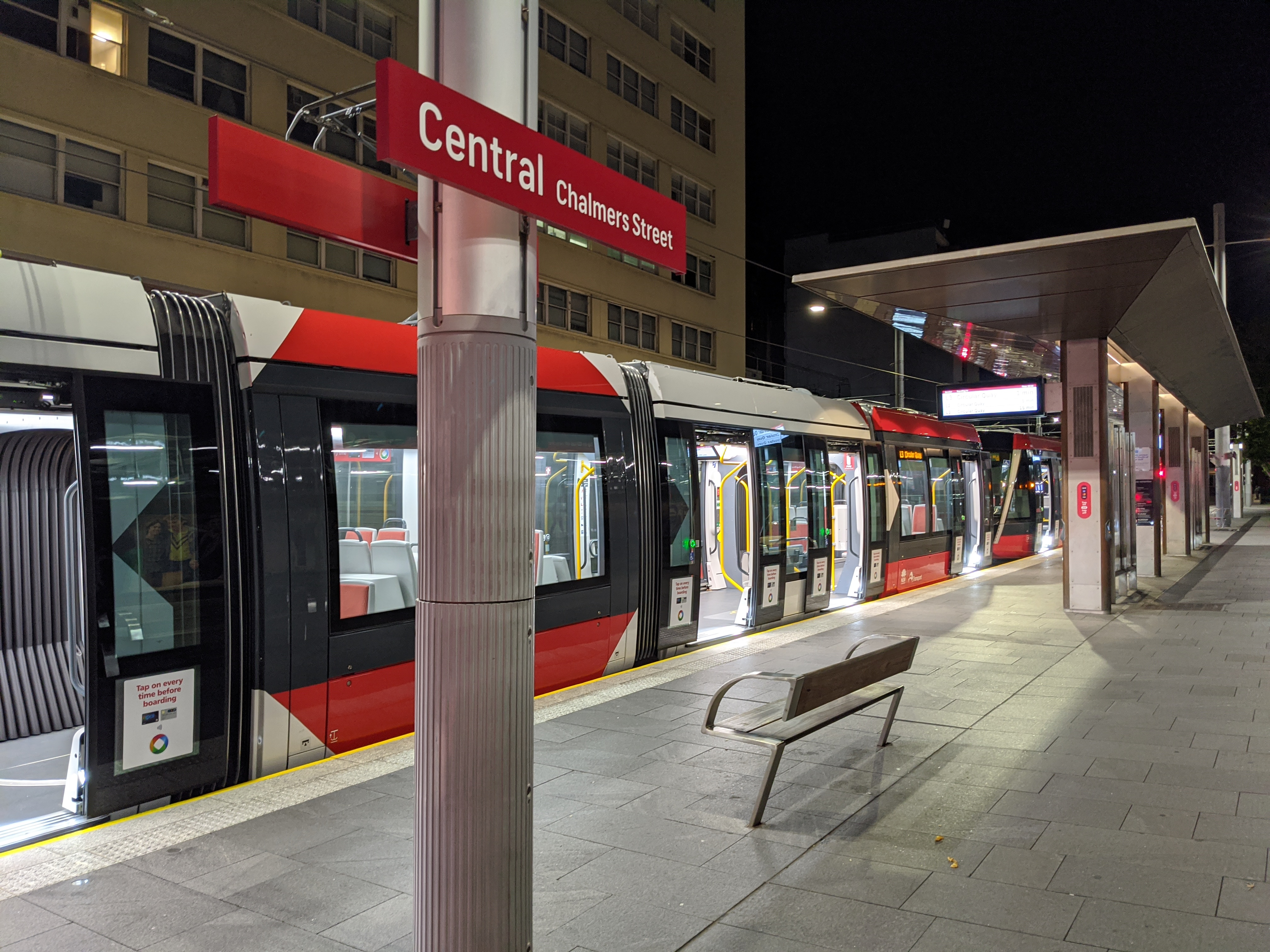
The CBD and South East Light Rail at Central Chalmers Street

Central Grand Concourse is the eastern terminus of the L1 Dulwich Hill Line that operates to Chinatown, Darling Harbour, Pyrmont and the inner west suburbs. The light rail stop is in an outside concourse area, near the main waiting area and departure hall. This area was used for trams until 1958, when the service was withdrawn. It was known as Railway Colonnade and then Central. Light rail services operate in a clockwise direction, whereas the trams operated in an anti-clockwise direction.

The L2 Randwick and L3 Kingsford lines between Circular Quay and Kingsford or Randwick also run via Central. Its nearest stops are the Haymarket, at Rawson Place to the northwest, and Central Chalmers Street, on Chalmers Street to the east.

Line	Stopping pattern	Notes
Dulwich Hill Line	services to Dulwich Hill	
CBD and South East Light Rail	services to Circular Quay & Randwick	
CBD and South East Light Rail	services to Circular Quay & Kingsford	

=== Bus services ===
Many bus services depart from the adjacent Eddy Avenue or from the nearby Elizabeth Street or Railway Square.

=== Coach services ===
Long distance coaches depart from the western forecourt and Pitt Street:

- Australia Wide Coaches operates services to Orange
- Firefly Express operates services to Melbourne and Adelaide via Melbourne
- Greyhound Australia operates services to Brisbane, Byron Bay, Canberra and Melbourne
- Murrays operates services to Canberra
- Port Stephens Coaches operates services to Fingal Bay via Nelson Bay
- Premier Motor Service operates services to Brisbane and Eden
- FlixBus operates services to Canberra and Melbourne.

== Heritage listing ==
Sydney Central station was listed on the New South Wales State Heritage Register on 2 April 1999, as a place which is important in demonstrating the course, or pattern, of cultural or natural history in New South Wales, and in demonstrating aesthetic characteristics and/or a high degree of creative or technical achievement in New South Wales, as well as having a strong or special association with a particular community or cultural group in New South Wales for social, cultural or spiritual reasons. The listing includes the Sydney Terminal building, the Sydney Yards adjacent to it, the Western Yard, the West Carriage Sheds, the Prince Alfred Sidings, the Central electric station, as well as adjacent buildings and infrastructure including the Mortuary Station, the Darling Harbour branch line, the Railway Institute and the Parcel Post Office. The listing also records alternative names including Sydney Terminal and Central Railway Stations Group and Central Railway; Central Station; Underbridges.

=== Heritage listed Movable items ===
- Train controllers desk, (AA15), third floor Sydney terminus
- Doors linking train controllers offices, (AD07), third floor Sydney terminus

=== Condition ===
As of 7 July 2020, the physical condition was good.

== Diagrams and maps ==
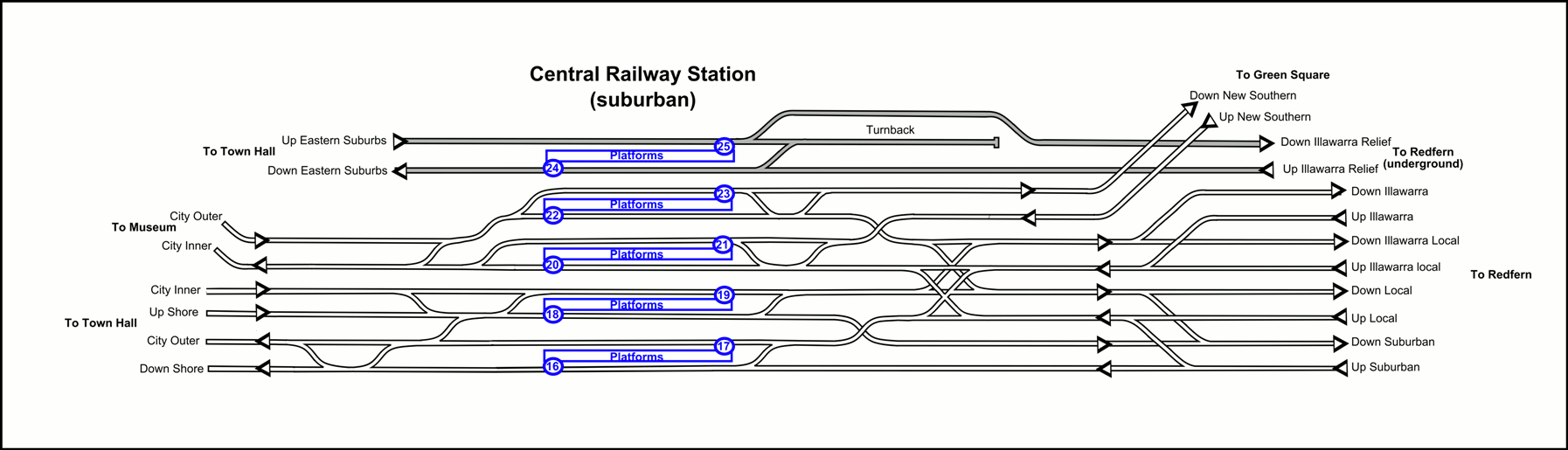
Diagram of track layout at the suburban section of the station. There are seven grade separations in the Flying junctions, plus one unused one

Map of the station
Map of the Central station precinct

== See also ==
- Architecture of Sydney
- Light rail in Sydney
- Regent Street railway station
- Rail transport in New South Wales
- Trams in Sydney
