= Domestic Airport railway station, Sydney =

Railway station in Sydney, New South Wales, Australia

Domestic Airport
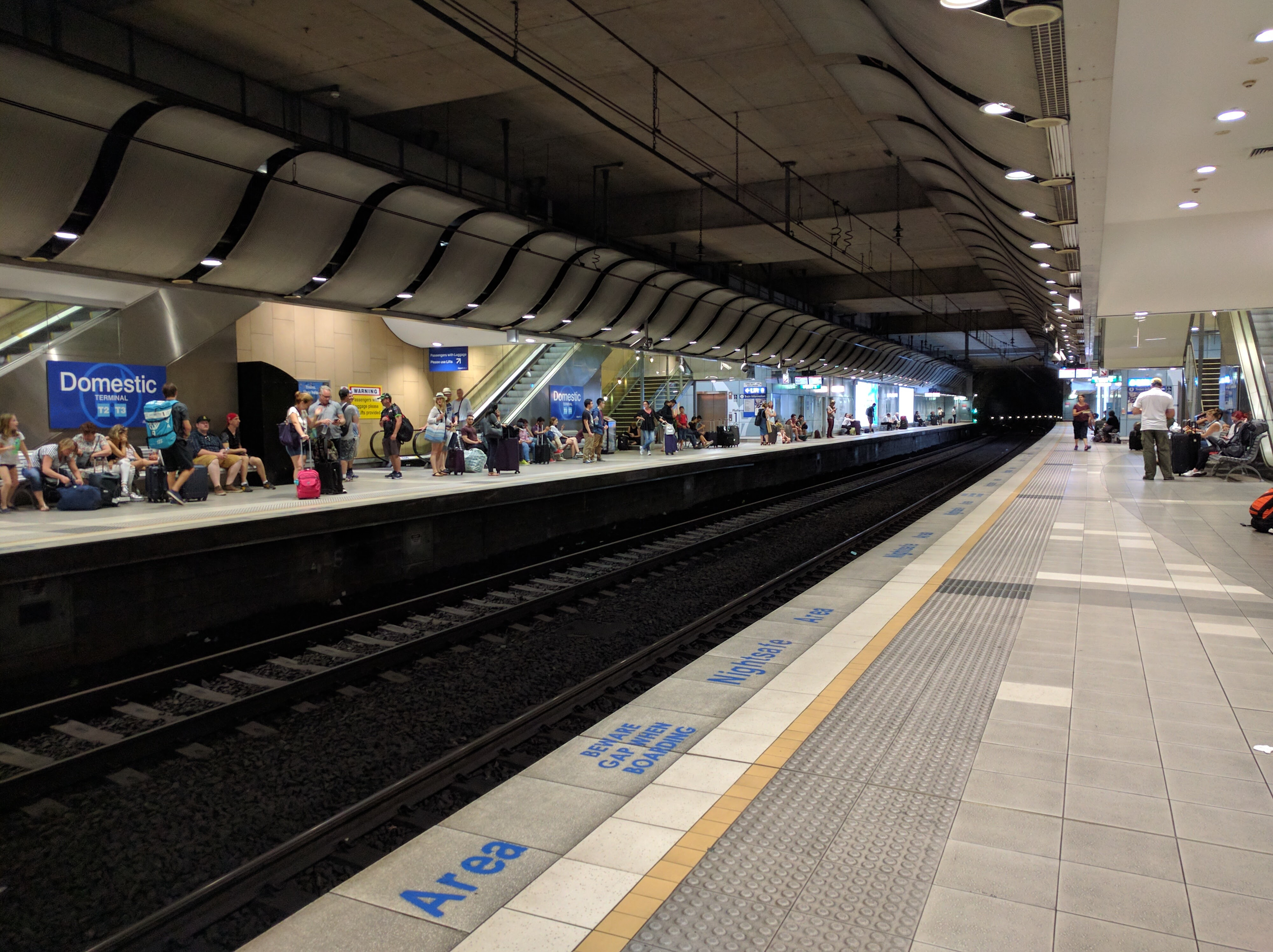
- Southbound view from Platform 2, January 2017

General information
- Location: Keith Smith Avenue, Mascot, New South Wales; Australia
- Coordinates: 33°56′01″S 151°10′51″E
- Owner: Airport Link Company
- Operator: Airport Link Company
- Line: Airport
- Distance: 6.60 kilometres (4.10 mi) from Central
- Platforms: 2 side
- Tracks: 2
- Connections: Bus; Plane

Construction
- Structure type: Underground
- Accessible: Yes

Other information
- Status: Weekdays: Staffed: 5am to 11.30pm: Weekends and public holidays: Staffed: 5am to 11.30pm
- Website: Transport for NSW

History
- Opened: 21 May 2000

Passengers
- 2025: 4,912,532 (year); 13,459 (daily) (Sydney Trains)
- Rank: 36

Services
Preceding station	Sydney Trains	Following station
International Airport towards Macarthur	T8 Airport & South Line	Mascot towards City Circle
Location

Domestic Airport is a train station located on the Airport Link, serving Terminals 2 and 3 at Sydney Airport, Australia. International Terminal 1 is served by International Airport station. The station is operated by Sydney Trains with T8 Airport & South Line services.

== History ==
Domestic Airport station opened on 21 May 2000 when the Airport Link opened from Central to Wolli Creek. Like other stations on the line, Domestic Airport was built and is operated by the Airport Link Company as part of a public–private partnership.

As part of the contract to build the line, an access fee is levied to recover the costs of building the line. Although often perceived as all going to the Airport Link Company, under the revenue sharing agreement, from August 2014 85% of revenues raised by the access fee go to the State Government.

== Platforms and services ==
Platform	Line	Stopping pattern	Notes
1	T8 Airport & South Line	All stations services to Central & the City Circle	
2	T8 Airport & South Line	services to Revesby & Macarthur; 2 weekday evening peak services to Campbelltown	

G	Street level	Exit/Entrance to Terminals
M	Mezzanine	Underpass between Terminals 2 & 3
C	Concourse	Fare control, Platform access
P Platform level	Side platform
P Platform level	Outbound	→ toward Revesby and Macarthur (International Airport)
P Platform level	Inbound	toward Central and City Circle (Mascot) ←
P Platform level	Side platform

== Transport links ==
Transdev John Holland operates one bus route via Domestic Airport station, under contract to Transport for NSW:

- 350: to Bondi Junction station

Transit Systems operates one bus route via Domestic Airport station, under contract to Transport for NSW:

- 420: Westfield Burwood to Mascot station

== Gallery ==
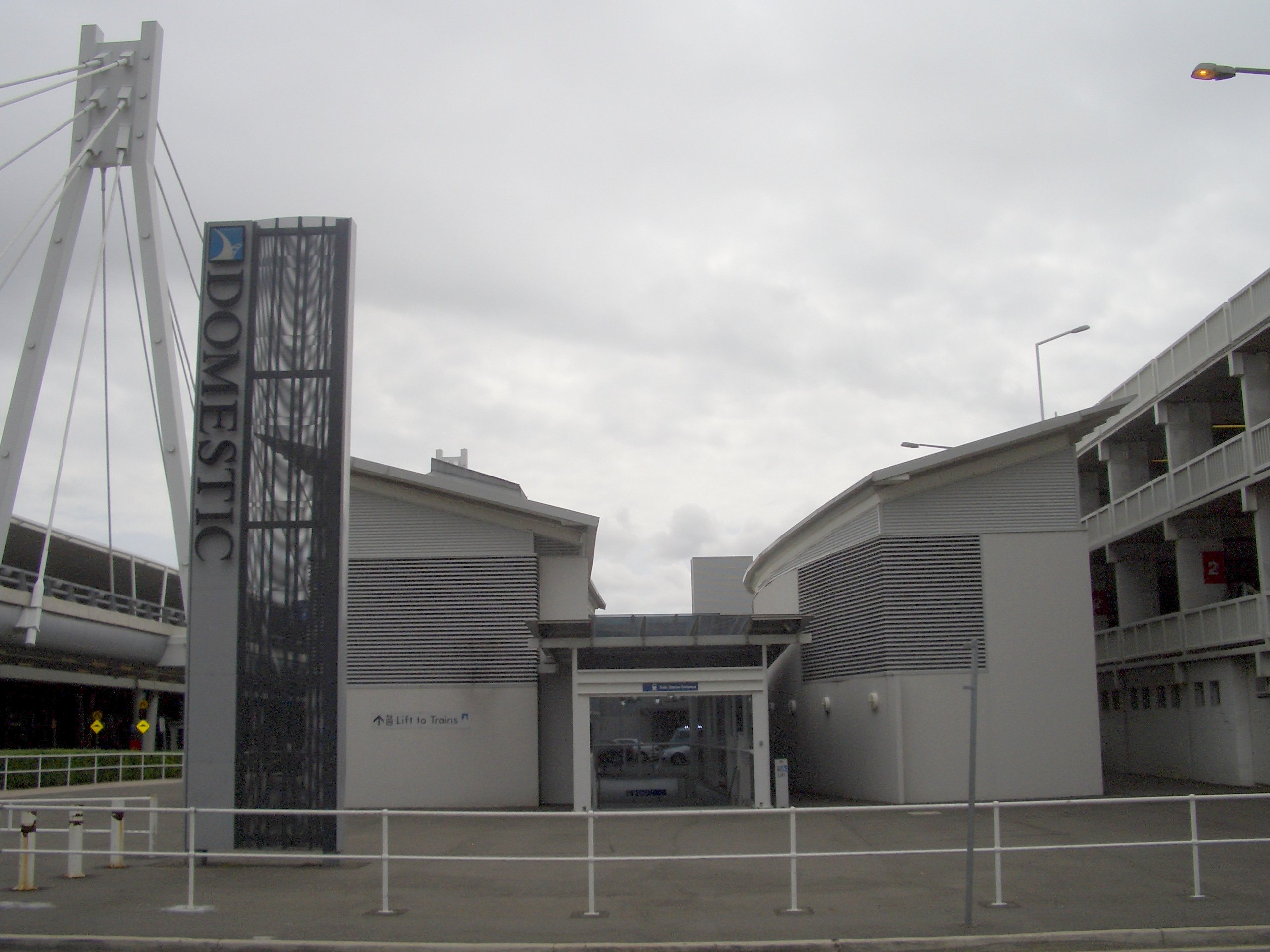
Domestic car park entrance and building,
January 2007

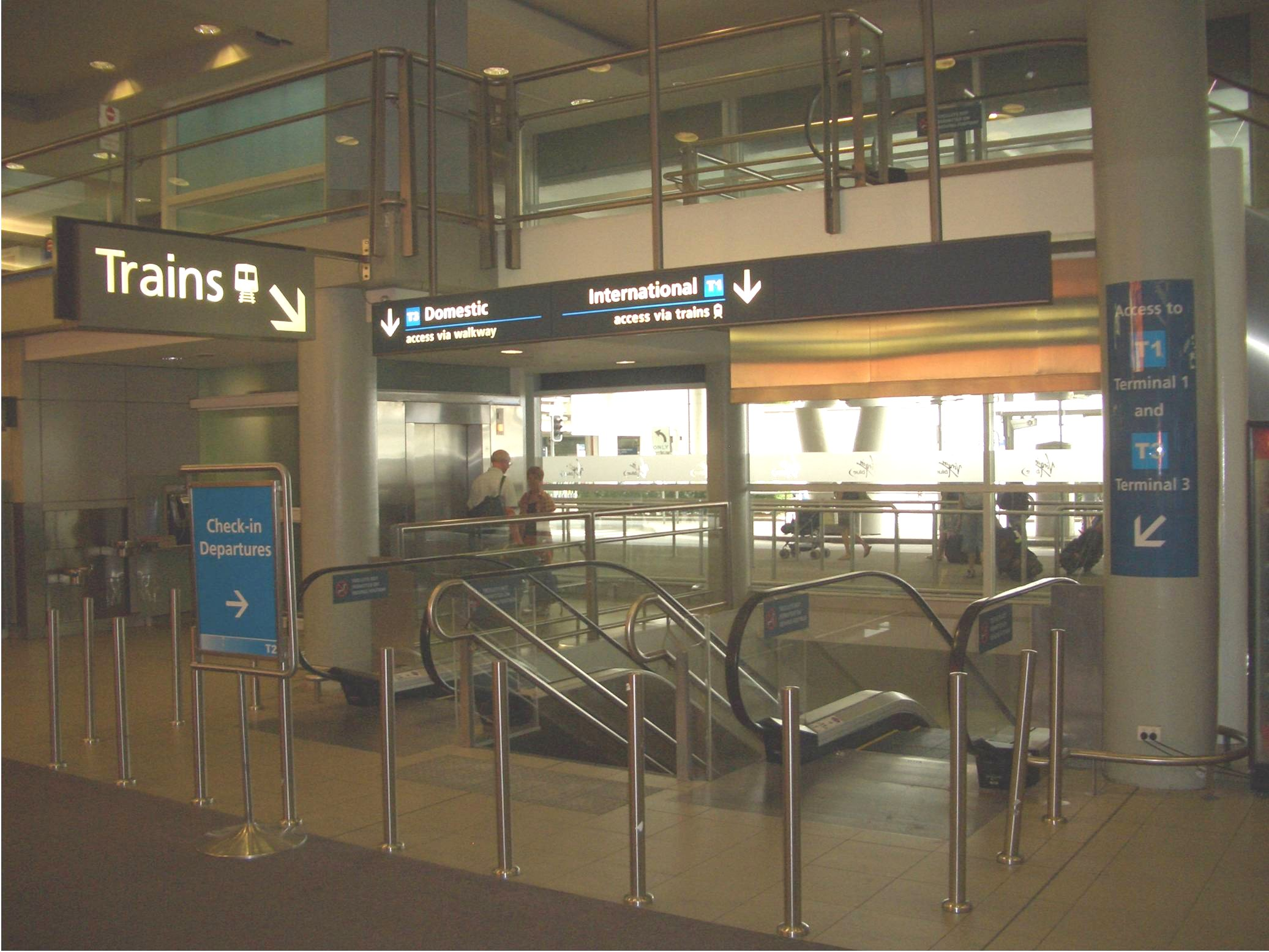
Domestic Terminal T2 entrance, January 2007

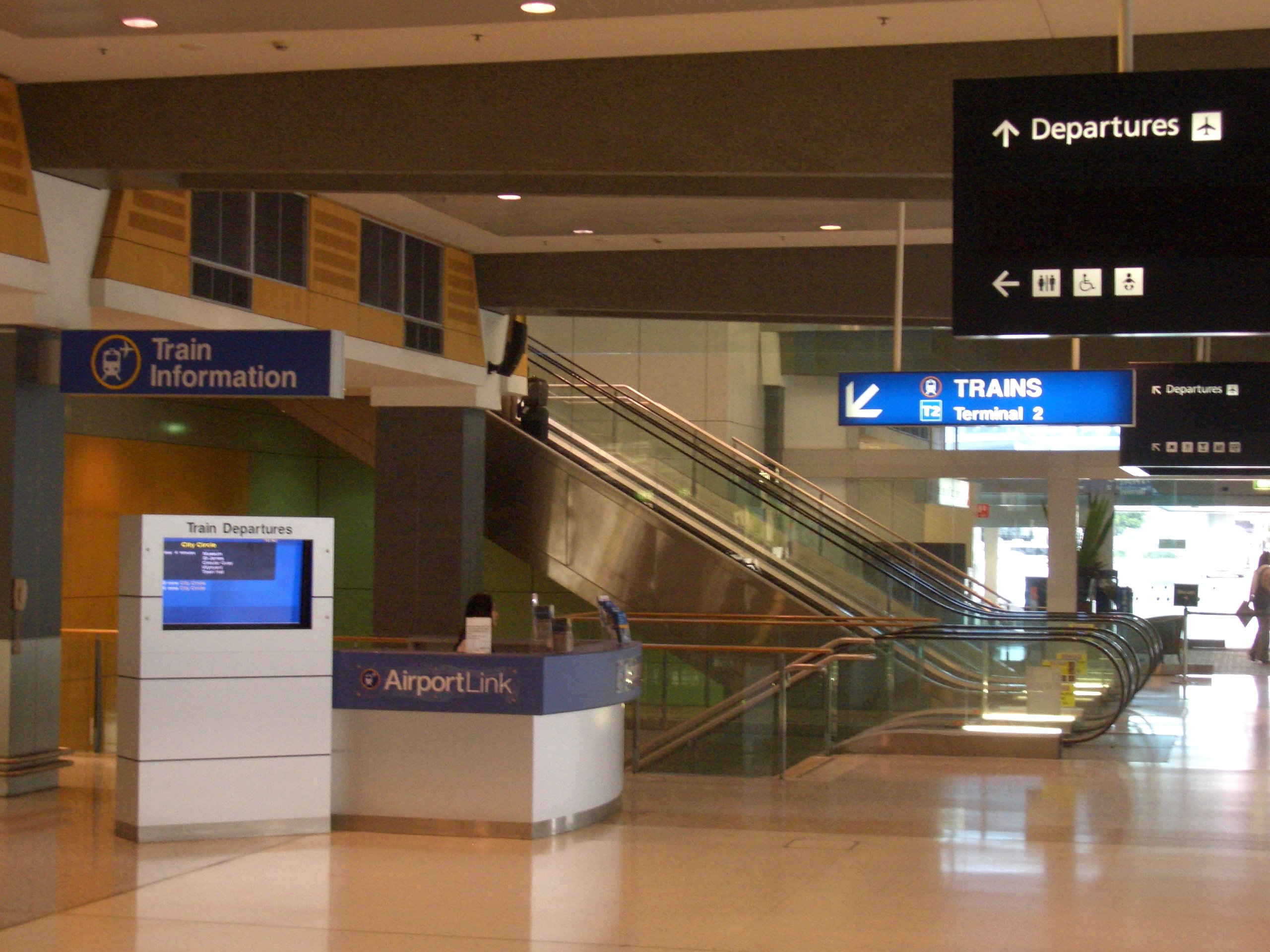
Qantas Domestic Terminal T3 entrance,
January 2007

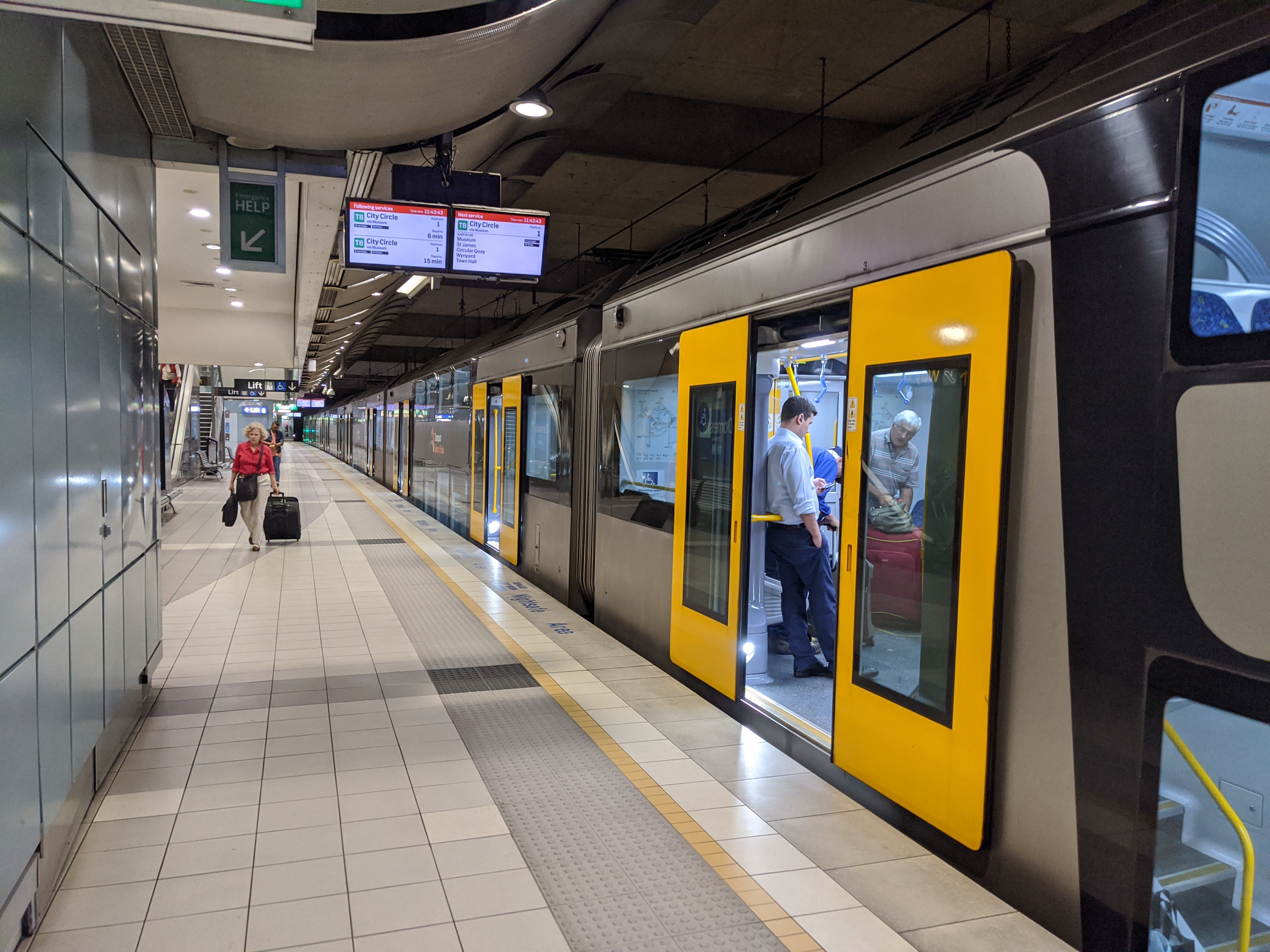
Sydney Trains service towards Central,
March 2020

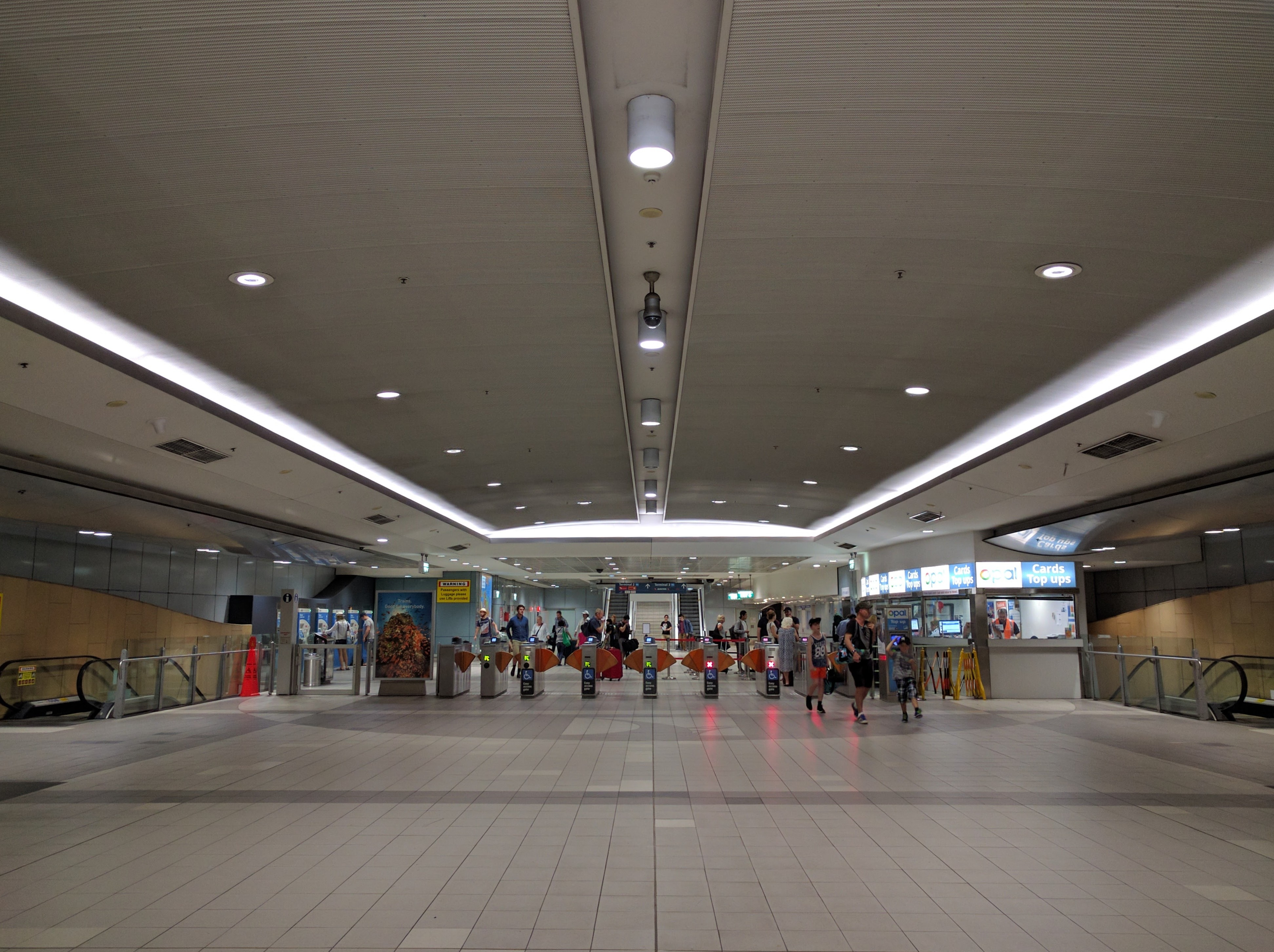
Concourse, January 2017
