= International Airport railway station, Sydney =

Railway station in Sydney, New South Wales, Australia

International Airport
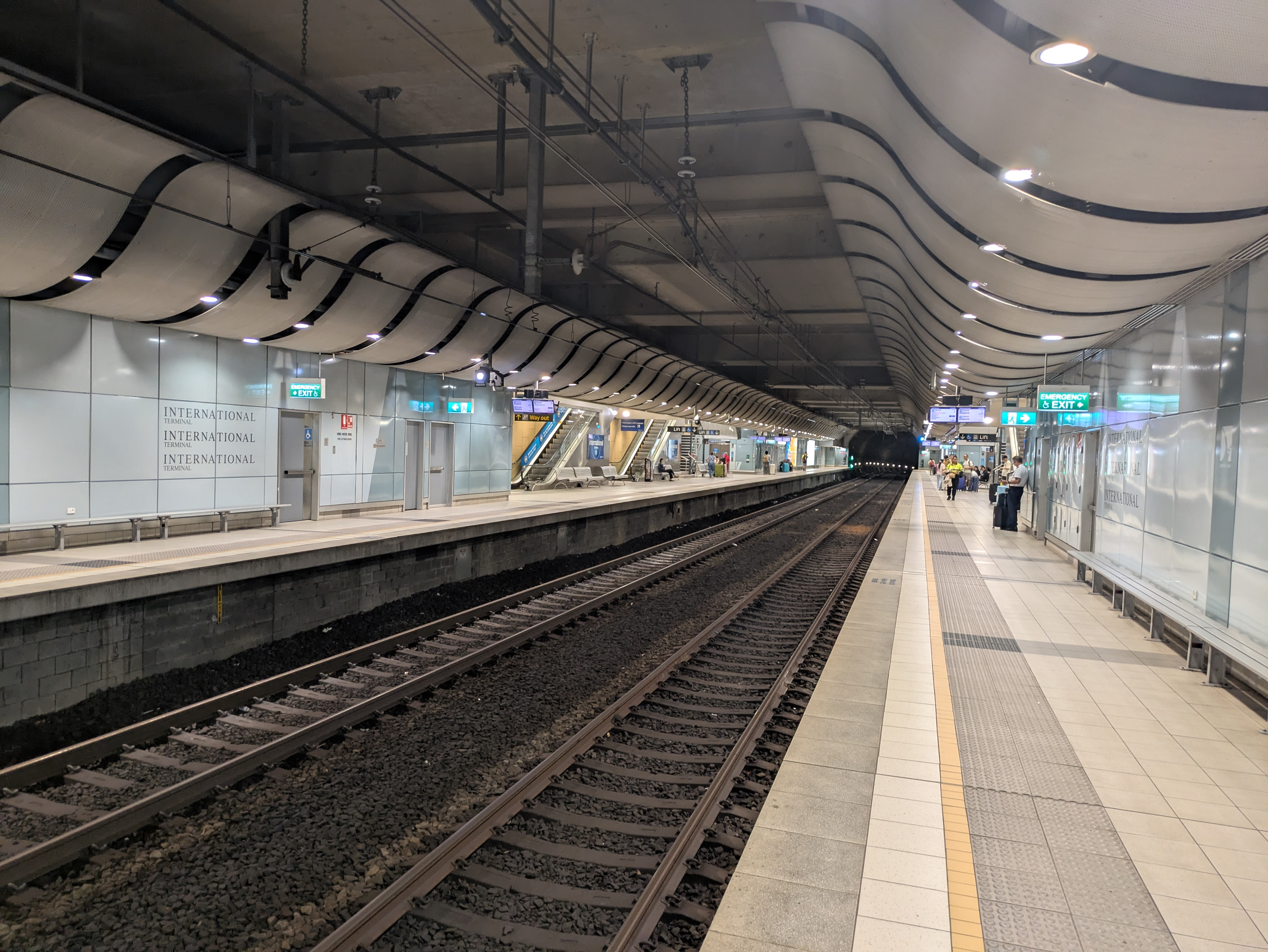
- International Terminal station platform, 2026

General information
- Location: Qantas Drive, Mascot, New South Wales; Australia
- Coordinates: 33°56′03″S 151°09′57″E
- Owner: Airport Link Company
- Operator: Airport Link Company
- Line: Airport
- Distance: 8.10 kilometres (5.03 mi) from Central
- Platforms: 2 side
- Tracks: 2
- Connections: Bus; Plane

Construction
- Structure type: Underground
- Accessible: Yes

Other information
- Status: Weekdays: Staffed: 5am to 11.30pm: Weekends and public holidays: Staffed: 5am to 11.30pm
- Station code: INT
- Website: Transport for NSW

History
- Opened: 21 May 2000

Passengers
- 2025: 3,195,753 (year); 8,755 (daily) (Sydney Trains)
- Rank: 52

Services
Preceding station	Sydney Trains	Following station
Wolli Creek towards Macarthur	T8 Airport & South Line	Domestic Airport towards City Circle
Location

International Airport is a train station located on the Airport Link, serving Terminal 1 at Sydney Airport, Australia. Terminals 2 and 3 are served by Domestic Airport station. The line is operated by Sydney Trains with T8 Airport & South Line services.

== History ==
International Airport station opened on 21 May 2000 when the Airport Link opened from Central to Wolli Creek. Like other stations on the line, International Airport was built and is operated by the Airport Link Company as part of a public–private partnership.

As part of the contract to build the line, an access fee is levied to recover the costs of building the line. Although often perceived as all going to the Airport Link Company, under the revenue sharing agreement, from August 2014 85% of revenues raised by the access fee go to the State Government.

== Platforms and services ==
Platform	Line	Stopping pattern	Notes
1	T8 Airport & South Line	All stations services to Central & the City Circle	
2	T8 Airport & South Line	services to Revesby & Macarthur; 2 weekday evening peak services to Campbelltown	

G	Street level	Exit/Entrance to Terminal
M	Mezzanine	Underpass to station
C	Concourse	Fare control, Platform access
P Platform level	Side platform
P Platform level	Outbound	→ toward Revesby and Macarthur (Wolli Creek)
P Platform level	Inbound	toward Central and City Circle (Domestic Airport) ←
P Platform level	Side platform

== Transport links ==
Transit Systems operates one bus route via International Airport station, under contract to Transport for NSW:

- 420: Westfield Burwood to Mascot station

== Gallery ==
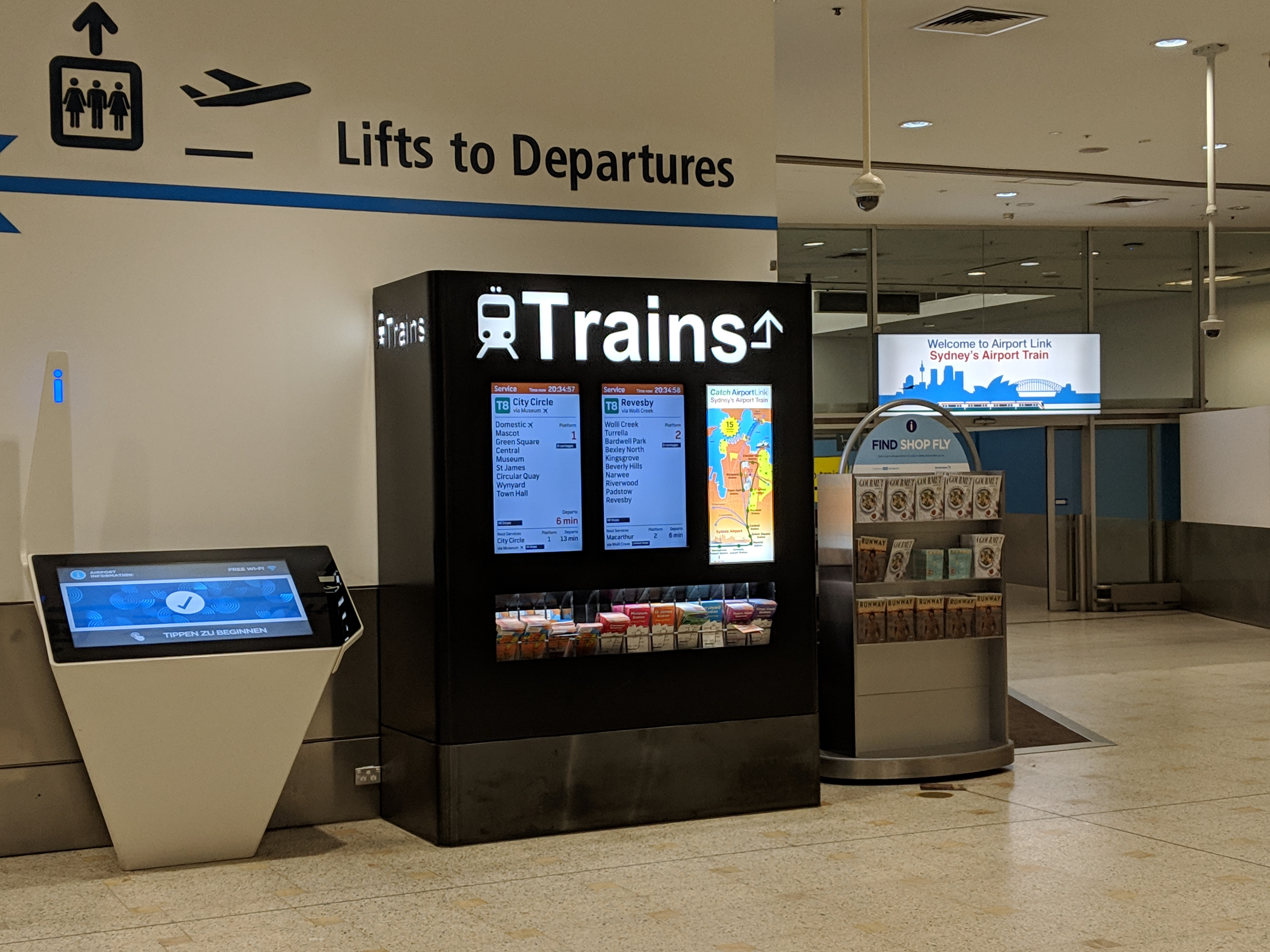
Entrance from Terminal 1

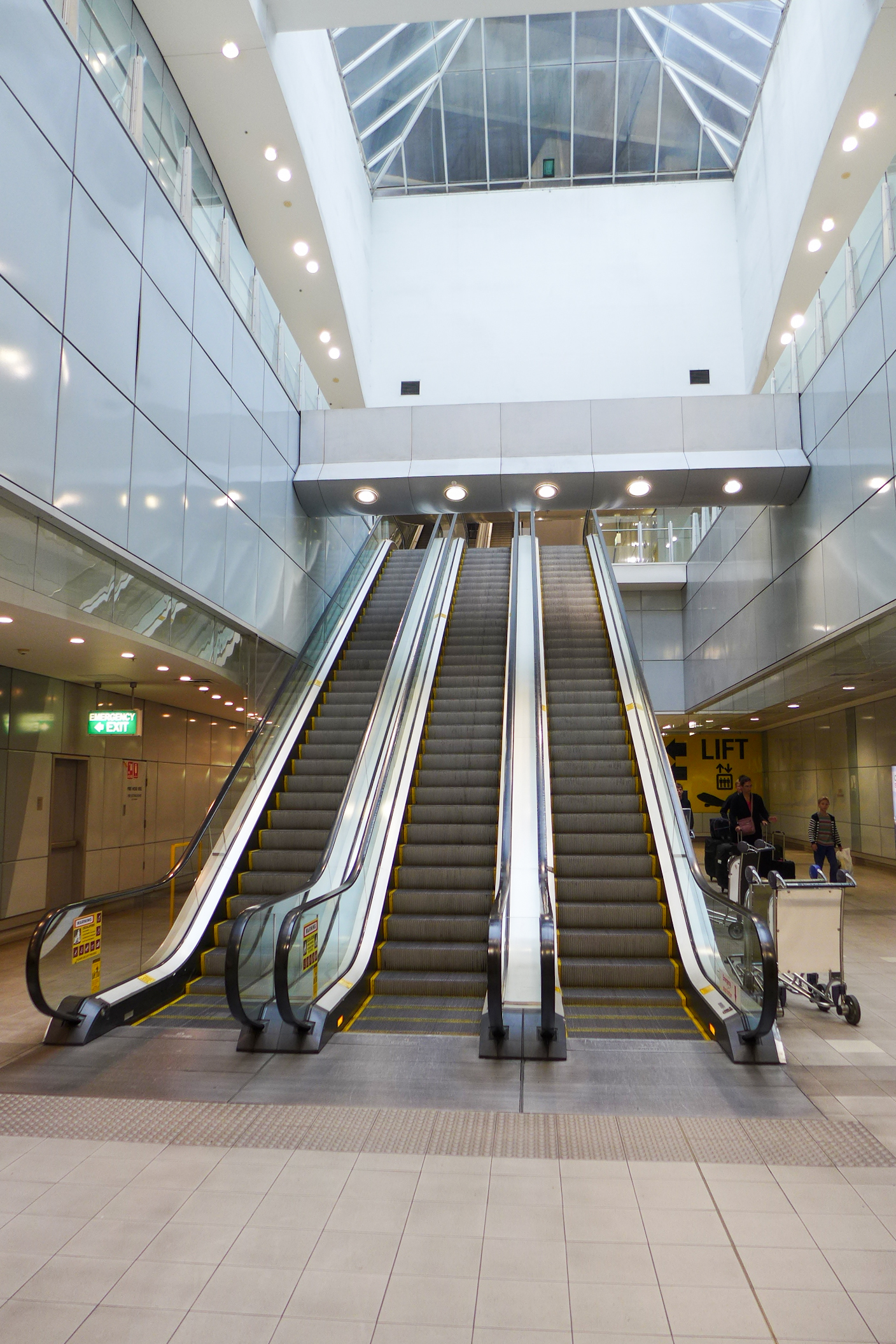
Escalator to airport

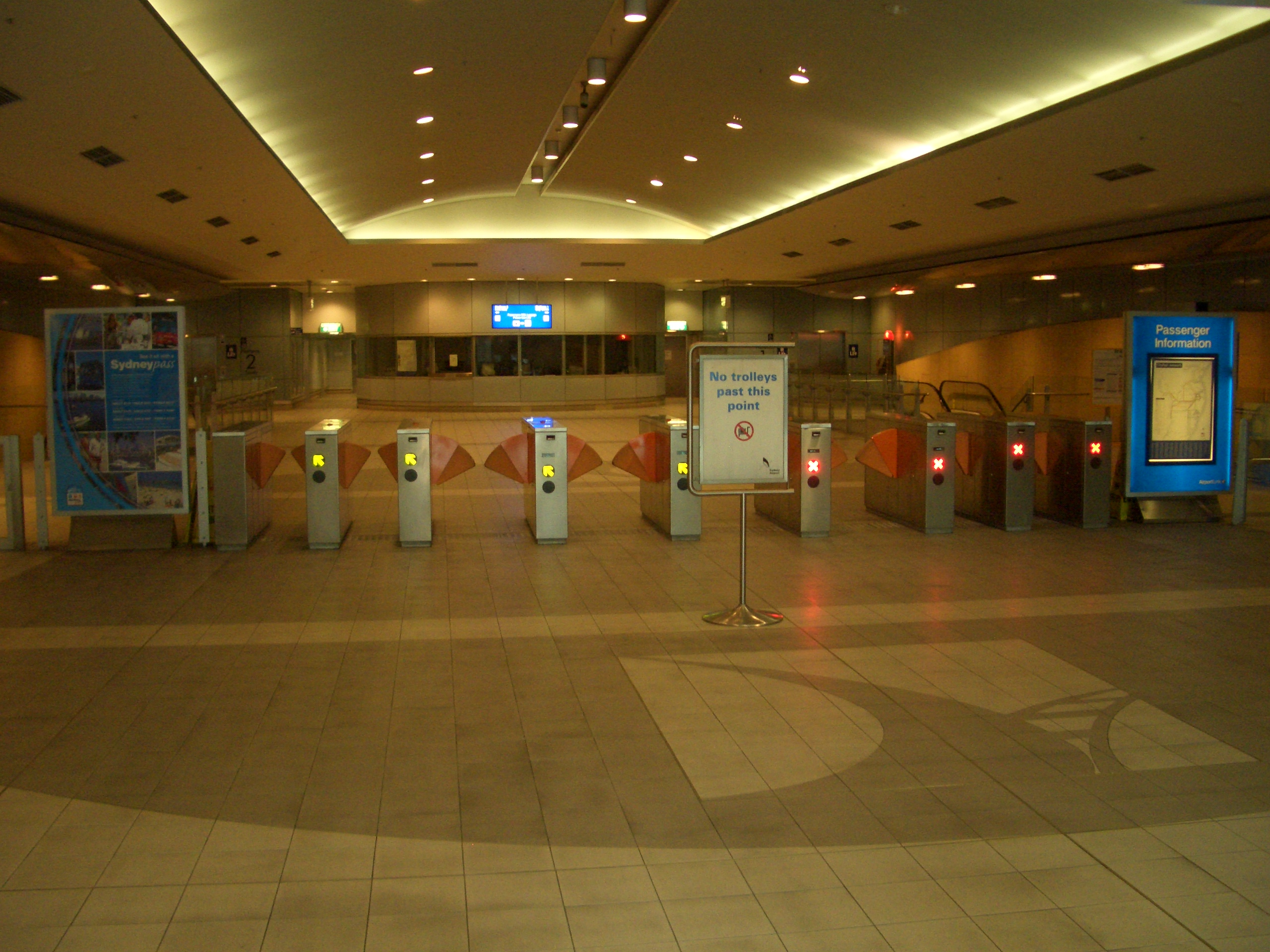
Rail terminal barricades and office

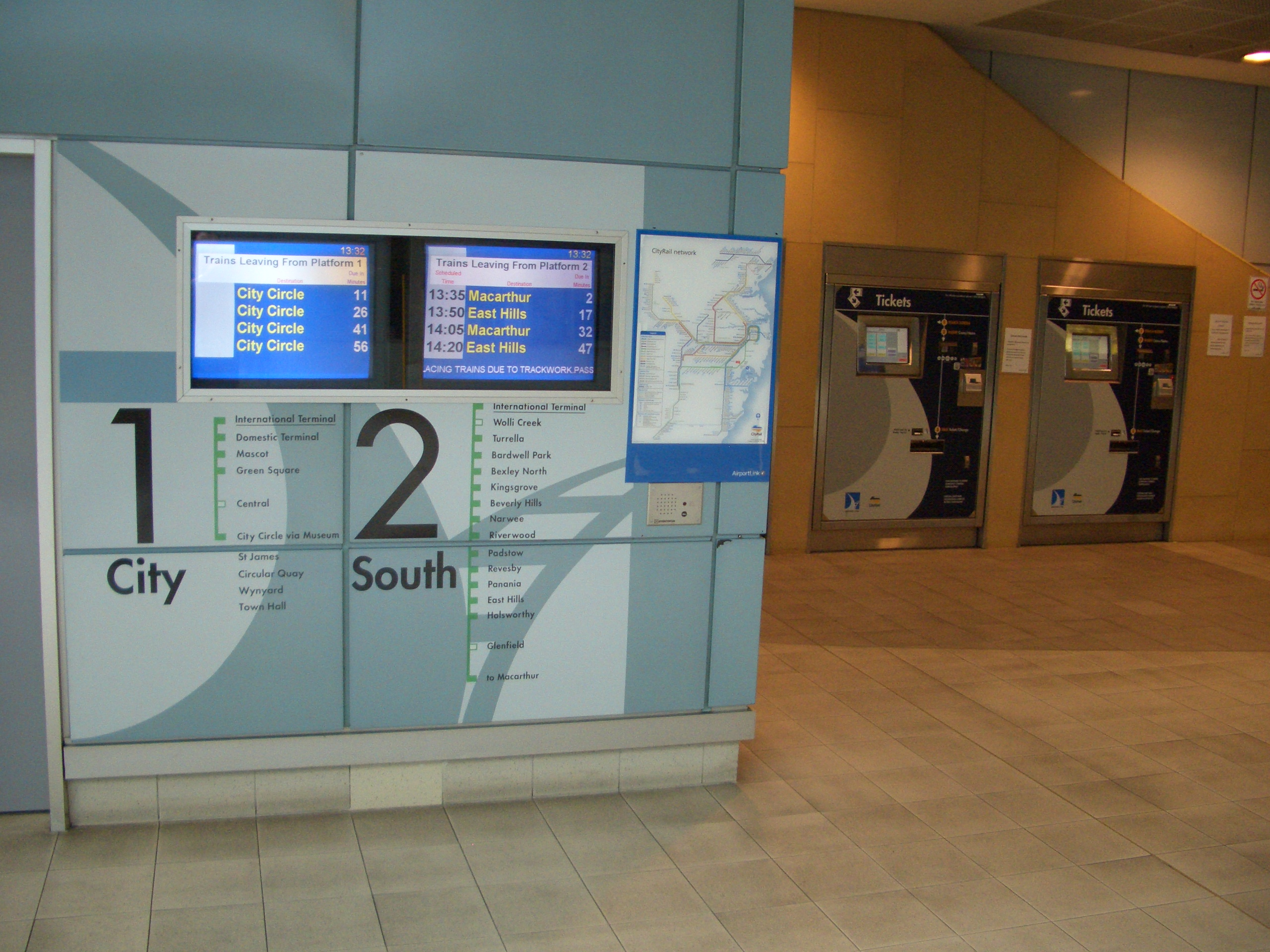
Rail terminal indicators and ticket machines
