= Green Square railway station =

Railway station in Sydney, New South Wales, Australia

Green Square
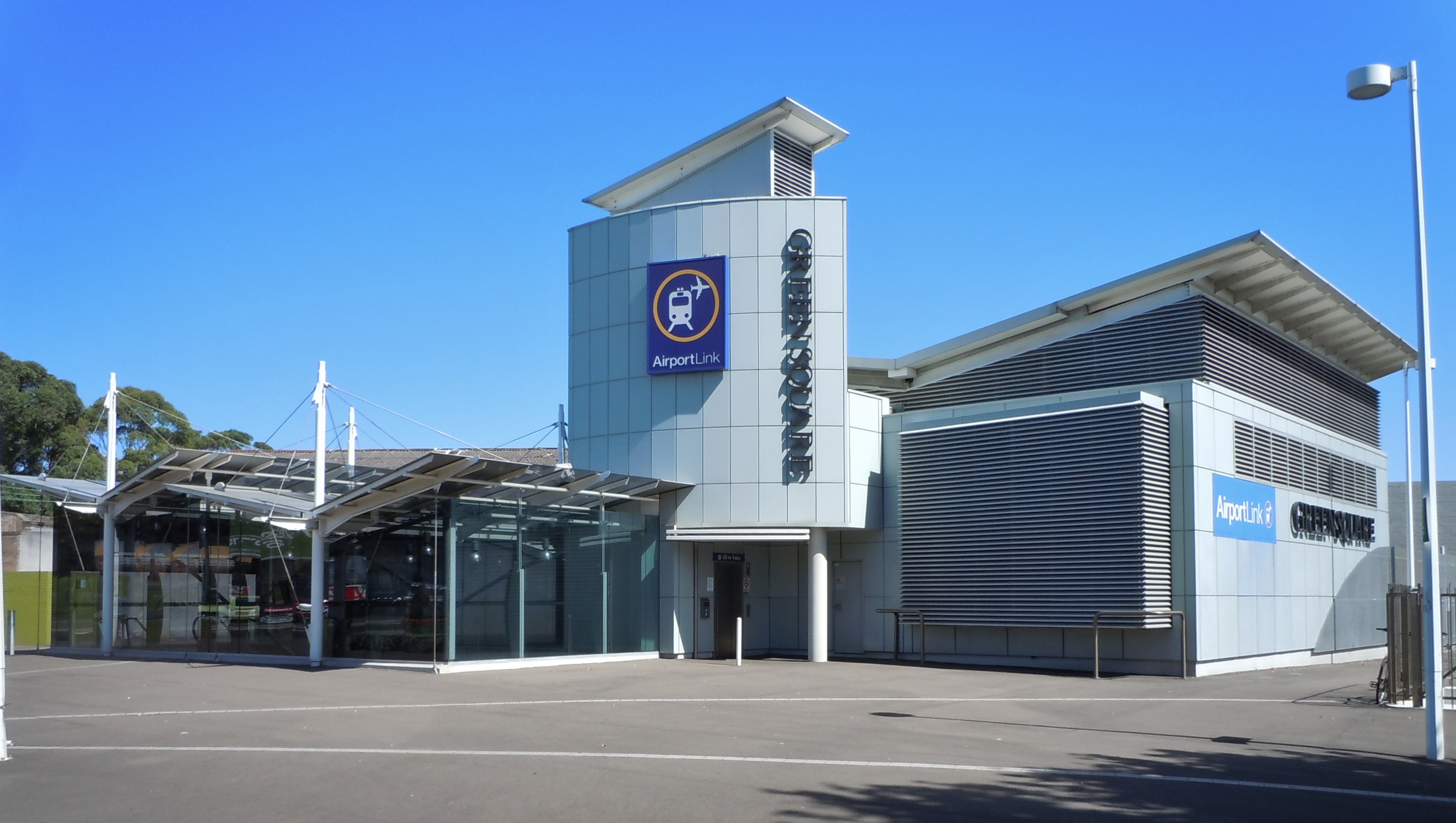
- Station building and entrance, March 2011

General information
- Location: Botany Road, Alexandria; Australia
- Coordinates: 33°54′22″S 151°12′09″E
- Owner: Airport Link Company
- Operator: Airport Link Company
- Line: Airport
- Distance: 2.60 kilometres (1.62 mi) south from Central
- Platforms: 2 side
- Tracks: 2
- Connections: Bus

Construction
- Structure type: Underground
- Accessible: Yes

Other information
- Status: Weekdays: Staffed: 5am to 11.30pm: Weekends and public holidays: Staffed: 5am to 11.30pm
- Station code: GQE
- Website: Transport for NSW

History
- Opened: 21 May 2000

Passengers
- 2025: 4,961,824 (year); 13,594 (daily) (Sydney Trains)
- Rank: 35

Services
| Preceding station | Sydney Trains | Following station |
|---|---|---|
| Mascot towards Macarthur | T8 Airport & South Line | Central towards City Circle |
Location

Green Square railway station is located on the Airport line in the locality of Green Square. The station is situated at a five-way intersection which is the meeting point of the four Sydney suburbs, Alexandria, Zetland, Waterloo and Beaconsfield. It is served by Sydney Trains' T8 Airport & South Line services.

== History ==
Green Square station opened on 21 May 2000 when the Airport line opened from Central to Wolli Creek. Like other stations on the line, Green Square was built and is operated by the Airport Link Company as part of a public–private partnership.

Prior to March 2011, passengers were required to pay an access fee to use the station. The access fee was removed after the State Government reached an agreement with the Airport Link Company to pay the fee at Green Square and Mascot stations on behalf of passengers. Patronage increased by around 70% at the two stations in the months following the removal of the fee. From 2014 to 2017, patronage was growing at an annual rate of around 25 percent, leading to overcrowding at peak times.

Green Square station featured in the music video clip for Marvin Priest's "Own This Club".

== Platforms and services ==
| Platform | Line | Stopping pattern | Notes |
| 1 | T8 Airport & South Line | services to Central & the City Circle | |
| 2 | T8 Airport & South Line | services to Revesby & Macarthur; 2 weekday evening peak services to Campbelltown | |

== Station layout ==
| G | Street level | Exit/Entrance to O'Riordan Street and Botany Road |
| M | Mezzanine |
| C | Concourse | Fare control, Platform access |
| P Platform level | Side platform |
| P Platform level | Outbound | → toward Revesby and Macarthur (Mascot) |
| P Platform level | Inbound | toward Central and City Circle (Central) ← |
| P Platform level | Side platform |
