= Airport Link Company =

Operator of the Sydney airport stations

- Parent: Universities Superannuation Scheme
- Founded: 1995
- Service area: Sydney
- Service type: Commuter rail
- Stations: 4

The Airport Link Company (AirportLink Pty Ltd) is the operator of the Green Square, Mascot, Domestic Airport and International Airport railway stations on the Airport Link tunnel in Sydney, Australia. The line is serviced by T8 Airport & South Line services of the Sydney Trains network. The company has a 30-year public private partnership to operate the stations, running until 2030.

== History ==
In July 1994, Australian investment company Transfield Holdings and French construction company Bouygues formed the Airport Link Company, which signed a public private partnership (PPP) with the Government of New South Wales to build and operate Airport Link – an extension of the Sydney Trains network to Sydney Airport.

As part of the agreement, Airport Link Company would construct the tunnels and the stations, before operating them over a period of 30 years – paying back the construction cost with a surcharge fare for passengers who use the stations. Construction began in February 1995, with the tunnel and the Airport Link stations opening on 21 May 2000.

In 2001, the Airport Link Company was placed in receivership after defaulting on its finance arrangements, with patronage figures only one quarter of forecasted figures, exposing the government to costs of around A$800 million. State Rail blamed "lower than expected patronage" and stated it was working with the company to increase it. In October 2005, the Government and the company signed a revised agreement on revenue and patronage, settling the latter's claims against the former. The Government paid A$34 million to the company, with another A$73 million due as CityRail earns revenue from Airport Line business.

The Airport Link Company was put up for sale in early 2006, and was purchased by Westpac. In 2009, the business made a profit of A$5.8 million which increased to A$9.3 million in 2010.

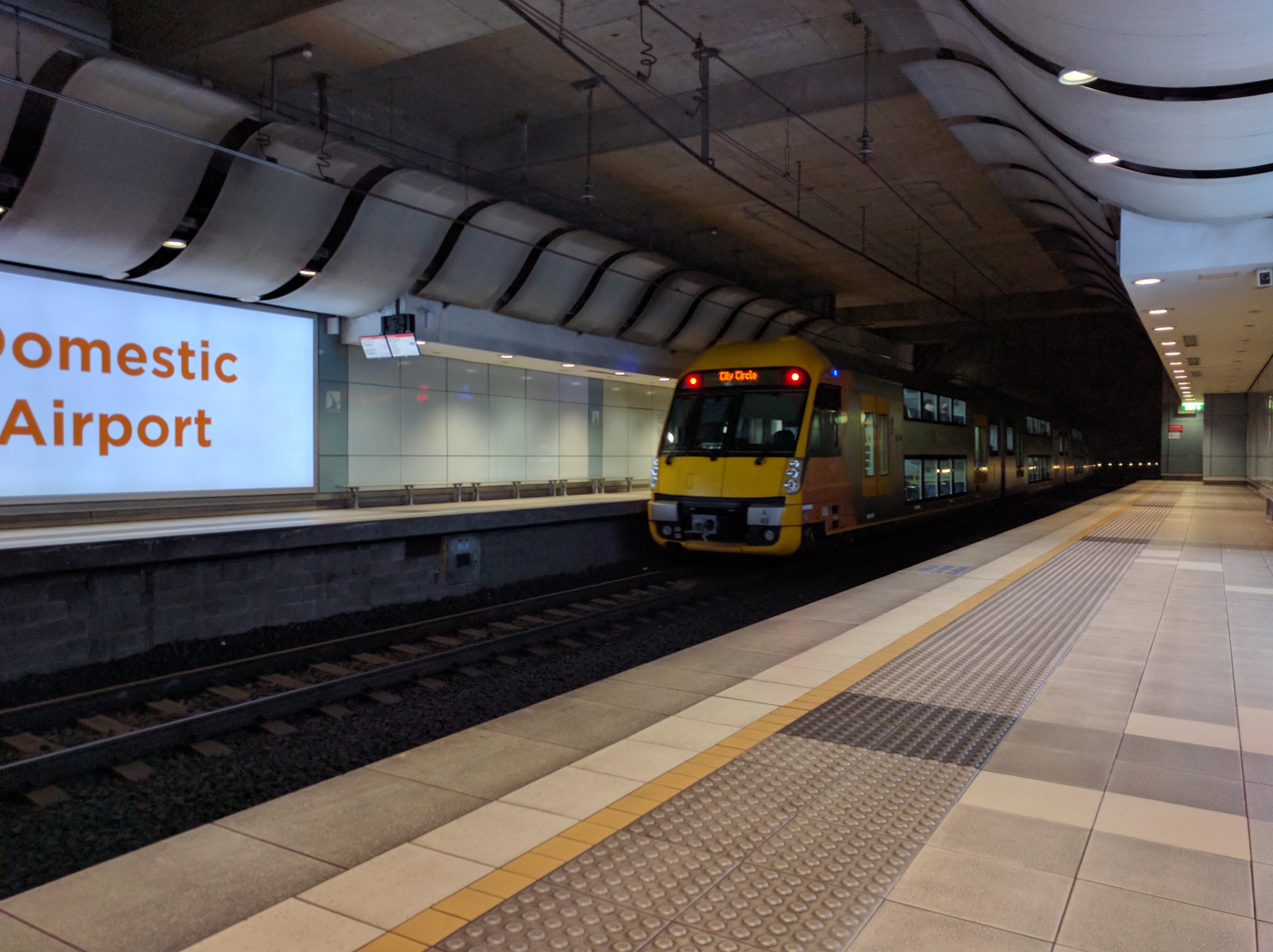
An A set at Domestic Airport station

In March 2011, it was announced that the Government of New South Wales would cover the cost of the station access fee at Green Square and Mascot stations, meaning that passengers no longer need to pay a surcharge to access these stations. To compensate Airport Link Company, the government now pays the company a 'shadow' station usage fee at a fixed contracted rate of approximately $2.08 per entry and exit of these stations. A fee remains in place for Domestic and International stations. Patronage on the link had been growing at 20% per year, but between March and June 2011 patronage increased by 70% as a result of the reduced fares.

In 2013, Universities Superannuation Scheme (USS) bought 49.9% of Airport Link Company from Hastings Funds Management-managed Westpac Essential Services Trust, adding to the stake it already owned. As a result, USS took control of the Airport Link Company.

== Public Private Partnership Arrangement ==
Under the service concession arrangement between the Airport Link Company and the Transport Asset Manager of New South Wales, the Airport Link Company has a concession to build, operate and maintain four stations on the Airport Line until 2030 and TAM will take over operation of the stations in 2030.

The 30-year public–private partnership will end on 20 May 2030, at which point the infrastructure will belong to the NSW Government.

Although often perceived as all going to the Airport Link Company, under the revenue sharing agreement, from August 2014 85% of revenues raised by the access fee go to the State Government. From 2015 to 2018, the Government of New South Wales received the total net revenue amount of $197.6 million from the station access fee. Between January 2013 and August 2014, the NSW Government received 50 per cent of net station access fees revenues.

TAM currently pays the shadow station access fee to the Airport Link Company. This amount is based on the entry and exit numbers at Mascot and Green Square stations, and the total contractual obligations totalled $279.331 million in 2024-25.

It has been agreed as between TAM and Sydney Trains that all annual train service fees net of shadow station access fees and other costs would be transferred from TAM to Sydney Trains to fund the provision of train services for future years. In 2024-25, $64.923 million was paid from TAM to Sydney Trains.
