= Mascot railway station =

Railway station in Sydney, New South Wales, Australia

Mascot
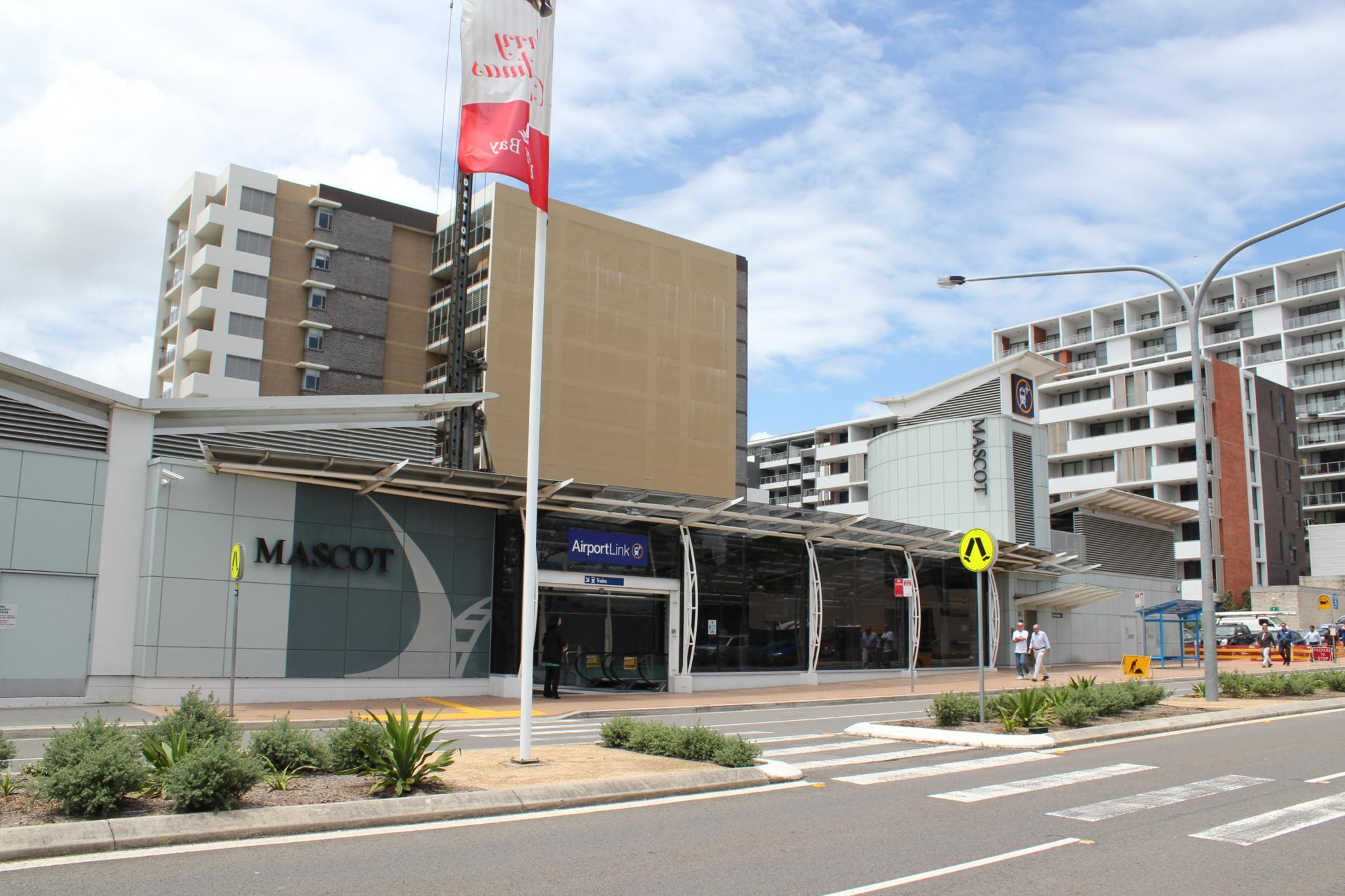
- Eastern station building and entrance, April 2012

General information
- Location: Bourke Street, Mascot; Australia
- Coordinates: 33°55′23″S 151°11′16″E
- Owner: Airport Link Company
- Operator: Airport Link Company
- Line: Airport
- Distance: 5.10 kilometres (3.17 mi) from Central
- Platforms: 2 side
- Tracks: 2
- Connections: Bus

Construction
- Structure type: Underground
- Accessible: Yes

Other information
- Status: Weekdays: Staffed: 5am to 11.30pm: Weekends and public holidays: Staffed: 5am to 11.30pm
- Station code: MCO
- Website: Transport for NSW

History
- Opened: 21 May 2000; 26 years ago

Passengers
- 2025: 8,814,881 (year); 24,150 (daily) (Sydney Trains)
- Rank: 17

Services
Preceding station	Sydney Trains	Following station
Domestic Airport towards Macarthur	T8 Airport & South Line	Green Square towards City Circle
Location

Mascot railway station is located on the Airport line, serving the Sydney suburb of Mascot. It is served by Sydney Trains' T8 Airport & South Line services.

== History ==
Mascot station opened on 21 May 2000 when the Airport line opened from Central to Wolli Creek. Like other stations on the line, Mascot was built and is operated by the Airport Link Company as part of a public–private partnership.

Prior to March 2011, passengers were required to pay an access fee to use the station. The access fee was removed after the State Government reached an agreement with the Airport Link Company to pay the fee at Mascot and Green Square stations on behalf of passengers. Following the removal of the fee, patronage increased by around 70% at the two stations in the months following, and passenger numbers rose substantially in the years following – with a 117% increase in ridership between 2015 and 2019.

The concourse of Mascot station contains the Mascot Operations Room, which is responsible for operation of the four privately operated stations on the Airport line.

At the platforms the station is signed "Mascot Suburban", to prevent confusion with the stations for the nearby airport, which is often referred to as Mascot Airport.

Following the substantial increase in passenger numbers since the removal of the access fee, it was announced in June 2020 that a new entrance/exit was to be built. This would be located on the western side of Bourke Street – opposite the existing main entrance. The existing station would also be upgraded, with additional ticket gates and public toilets. Works began in early 2021 and the new access was opened on 21 December 2023.

== Platforms and services ==
Platform	Line	Stopping pattern	Notes
1	T8 Airport & South Line	All stations services to Central & the City Circle	
2	T8 Airport & South Line	services to Revesby & Macarthur; 2 weekday evening peak services to Campbelltown	

== Station layout ==
G	Street level	Exit/Entrance to Bourke Street
M	Mezzanine
C	Concourse	Fare control, Platform access
P Platform level	Side platform
P Platform level	Outbound	→ toward Revesby and Macarthur (Domestic Airport)
P Platform level	Inbound	toward Central and City Circle (Green Square) ←
P Platform level	Side platform

== Transport links ==
Transdev John Holland operates three bus routes via Mascot station, under contract to Transport for NSW:

- 306: to Redfern station
- 307: to Westfield Eastgardens
- 350: Domestic Terminal to Bondi Junction station

Transit Systems operates two bus routes via Mascot station, under contract to Transport for NSW:

- 358: Sydenham station to Randwick
- 420: to Westfield Burwood

== Gallery ==
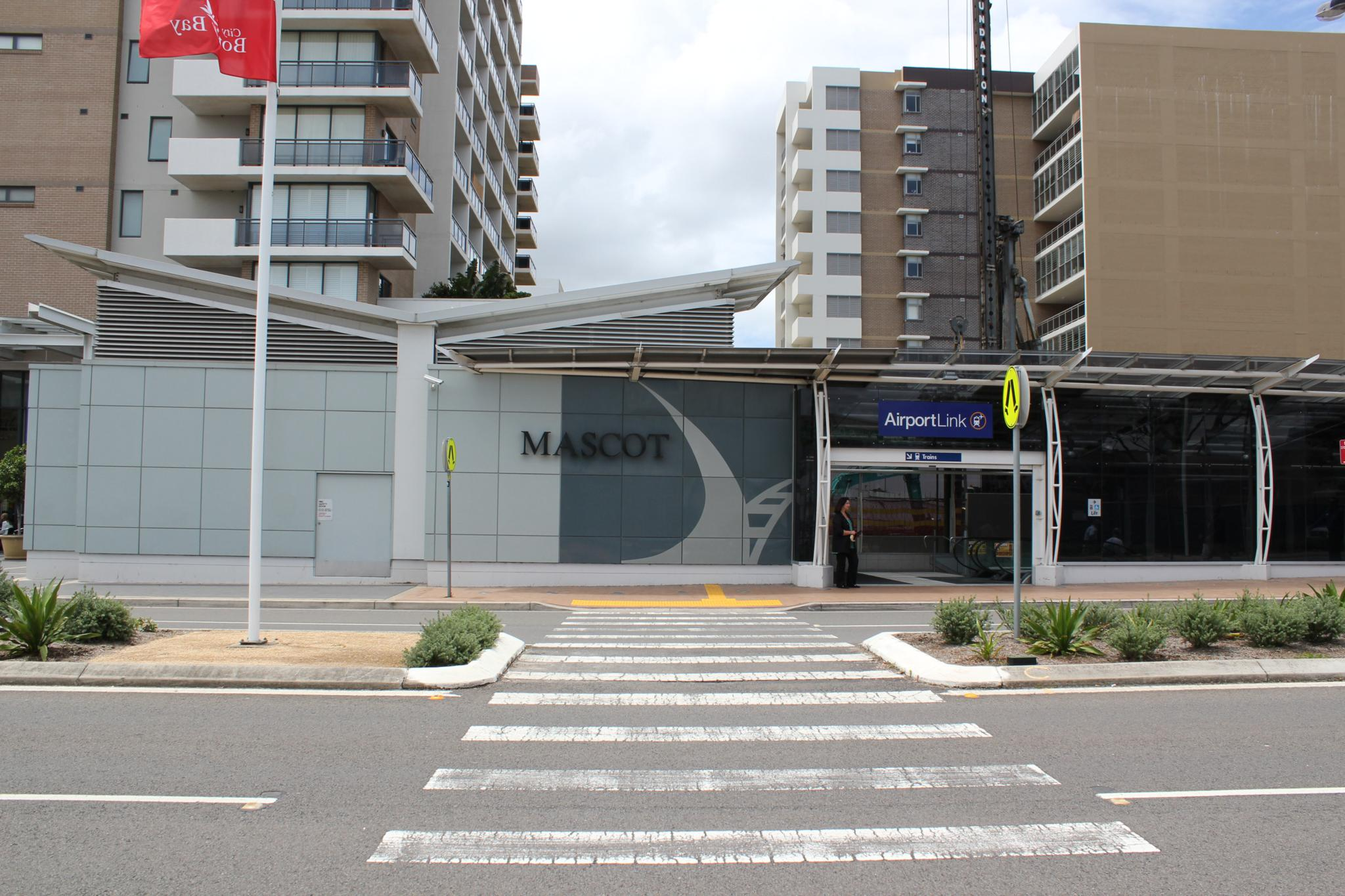
Eastern entrance

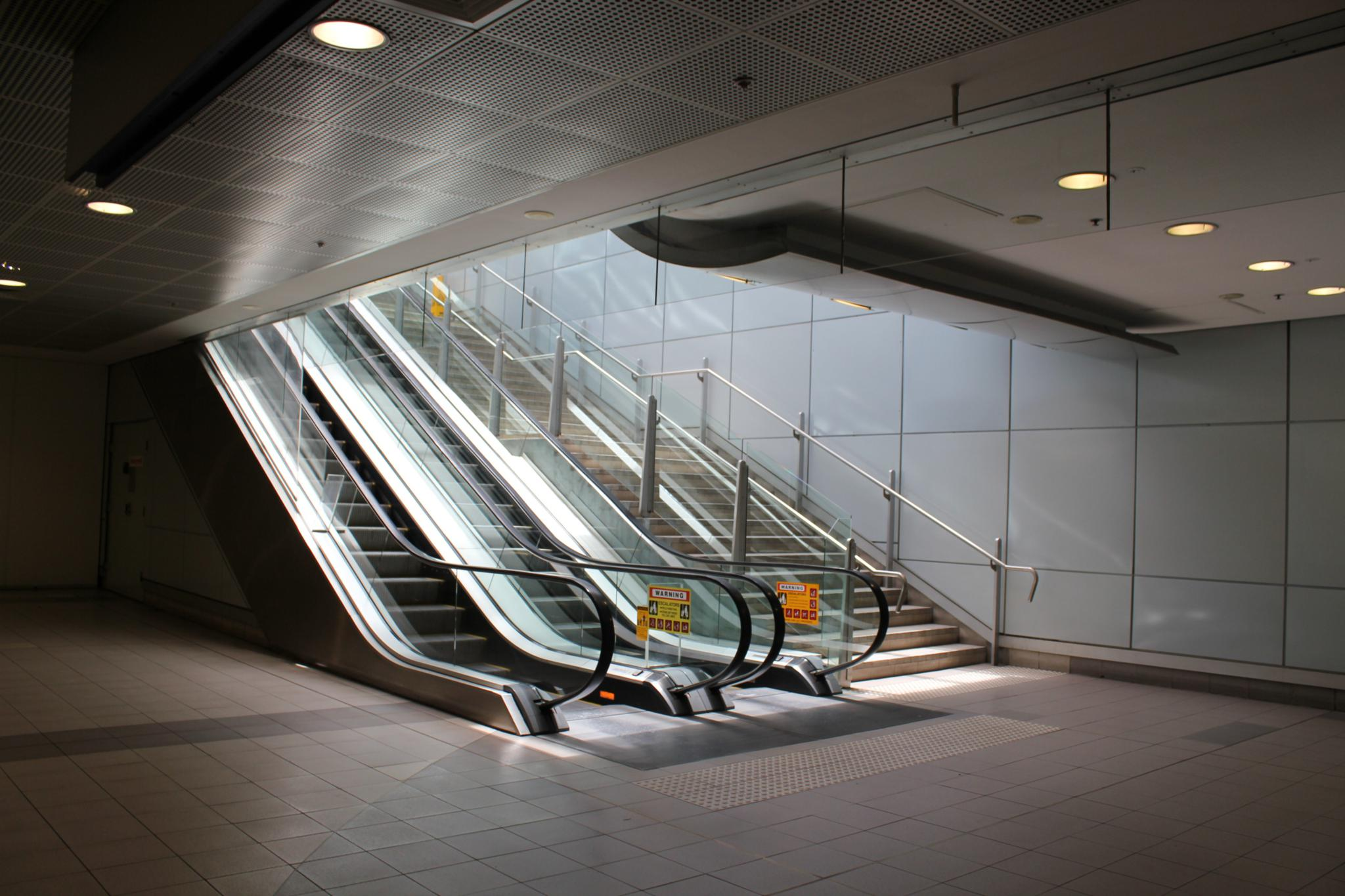
Eastern exit

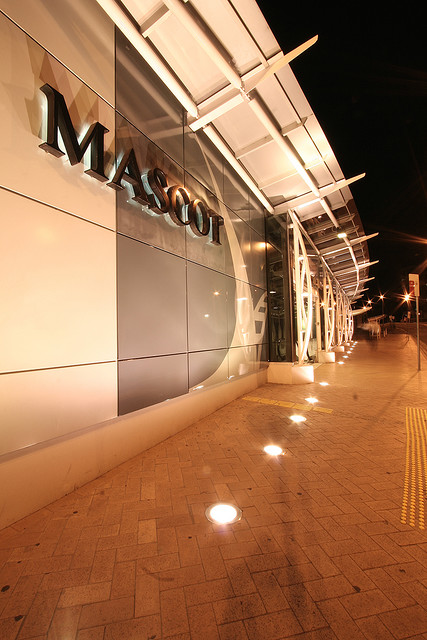
Eastern entrance at night

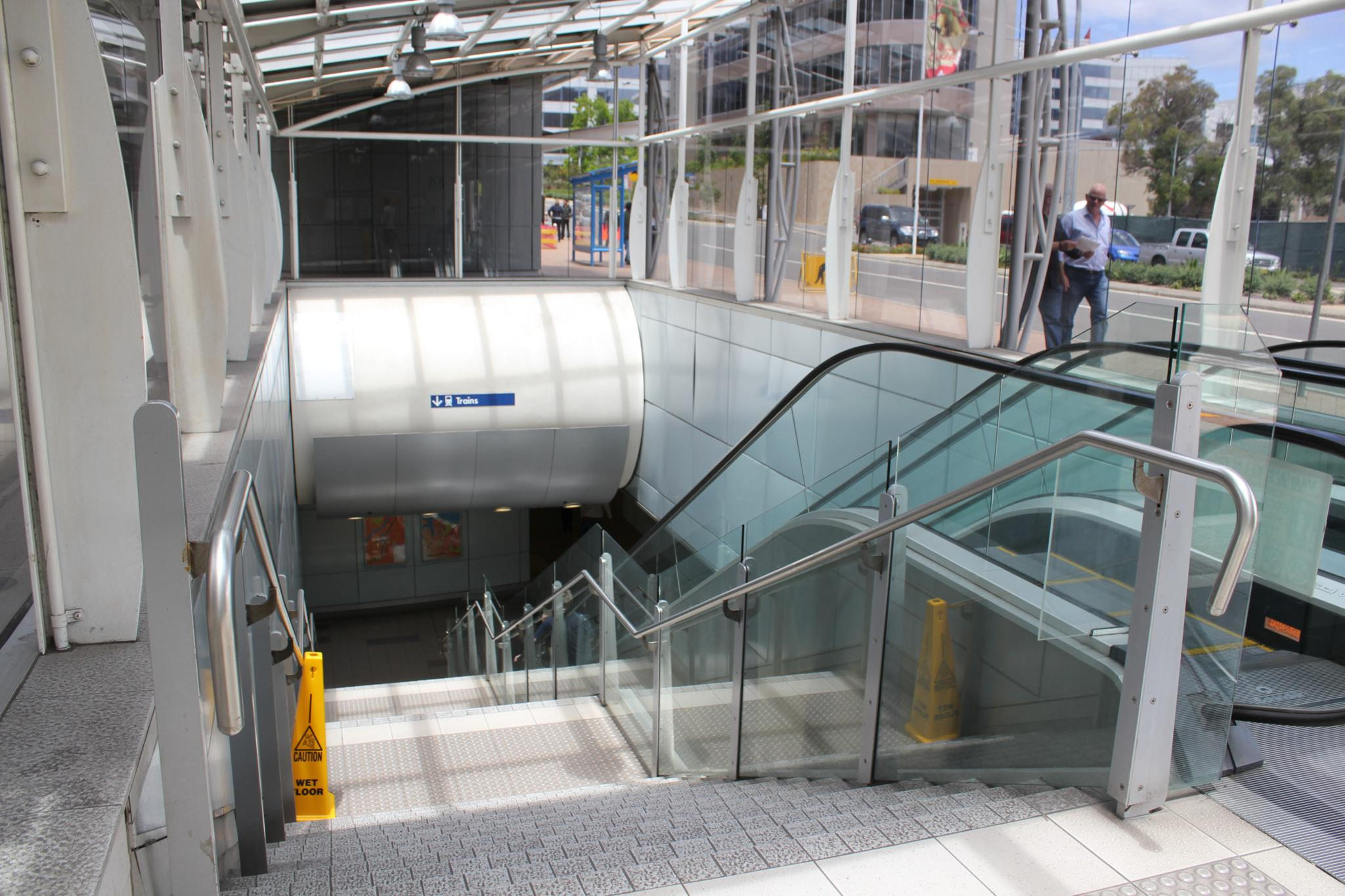
Eastern entry via stairs

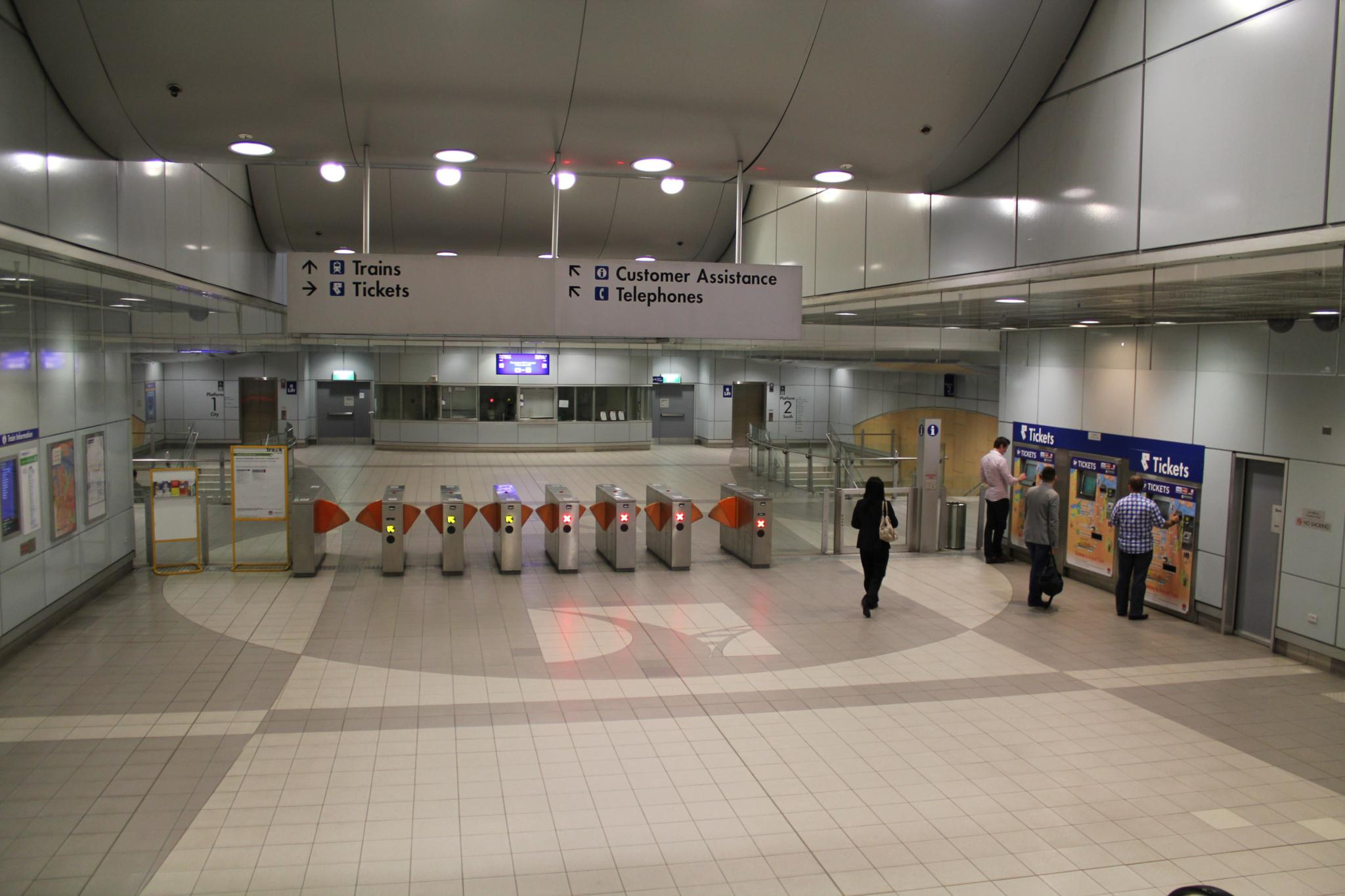
Ticket barriers

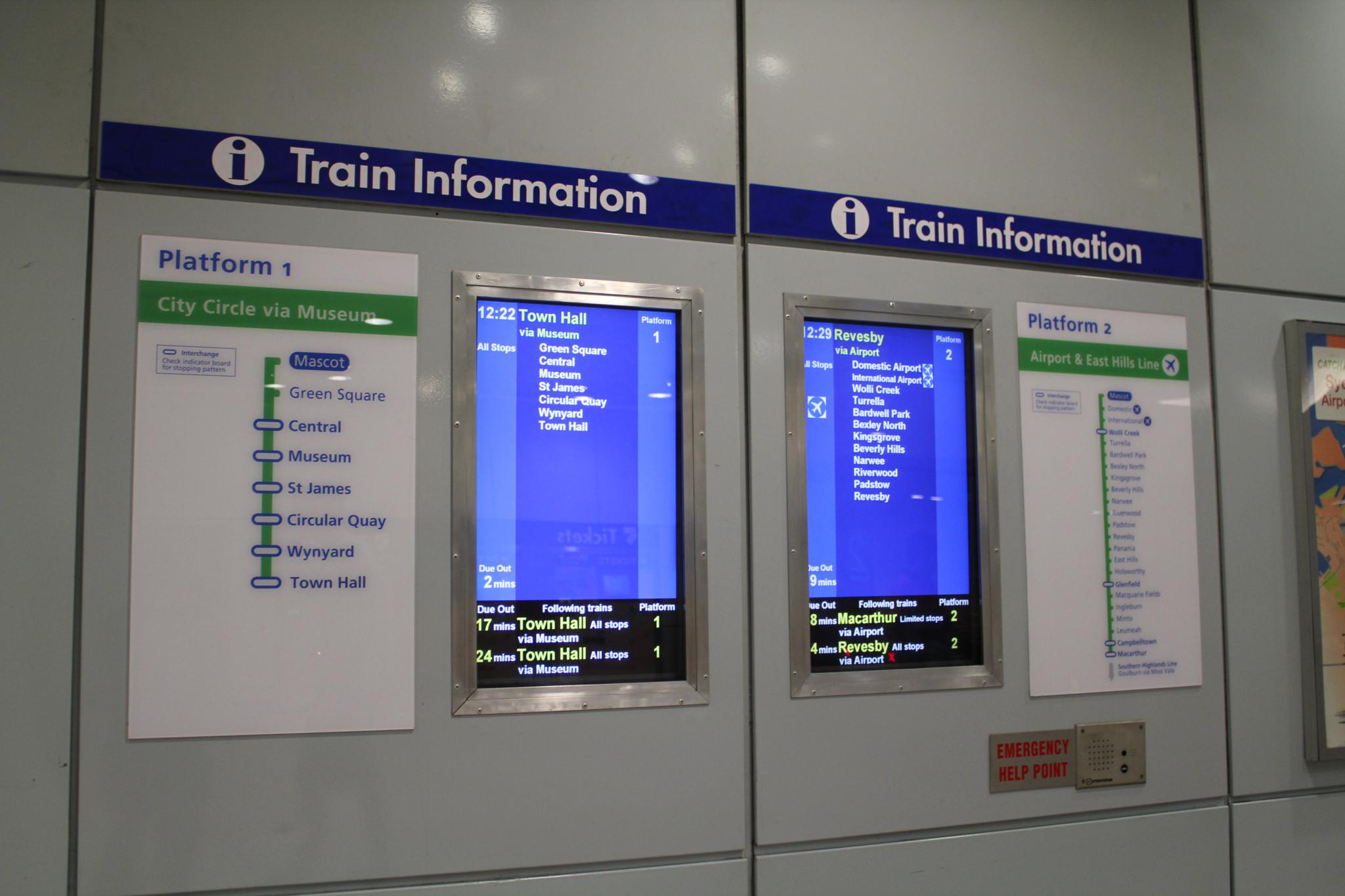
Indicator boards

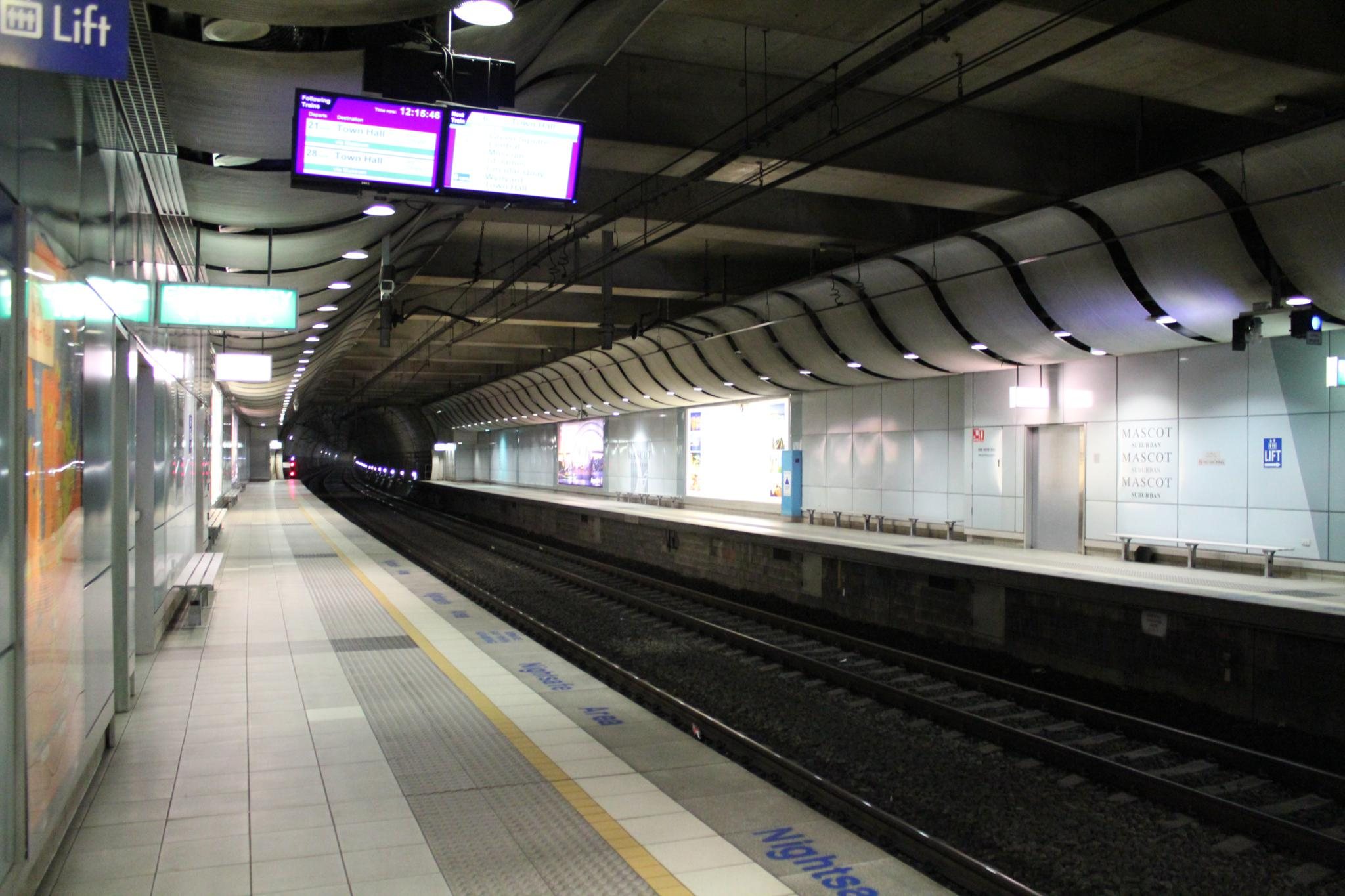
Platforms

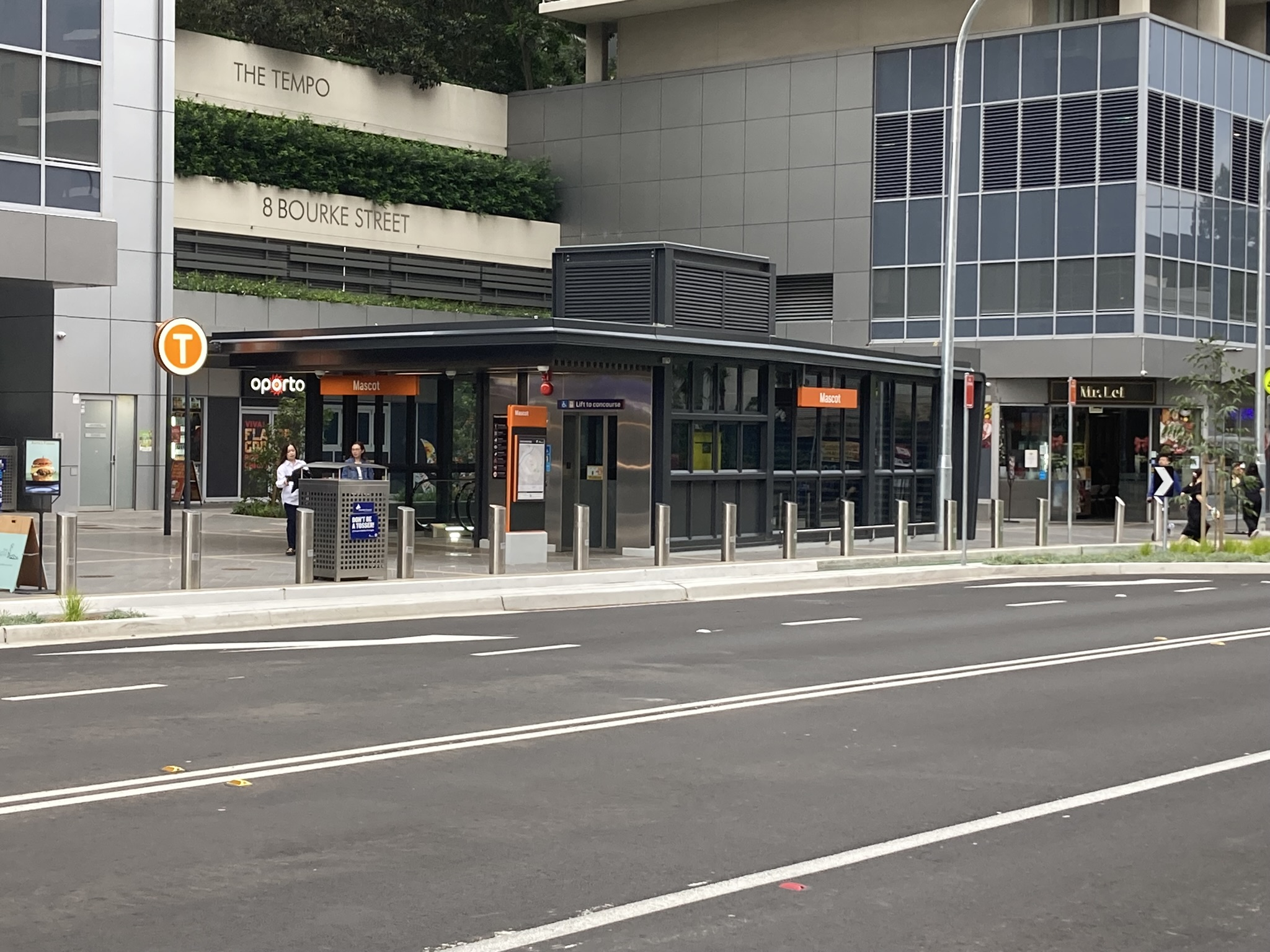
Western entrance five days after opening, December 2023
