= Airport Link, Sydney =

Railway line in Sydney, New South Wales, Australia

Airport Link
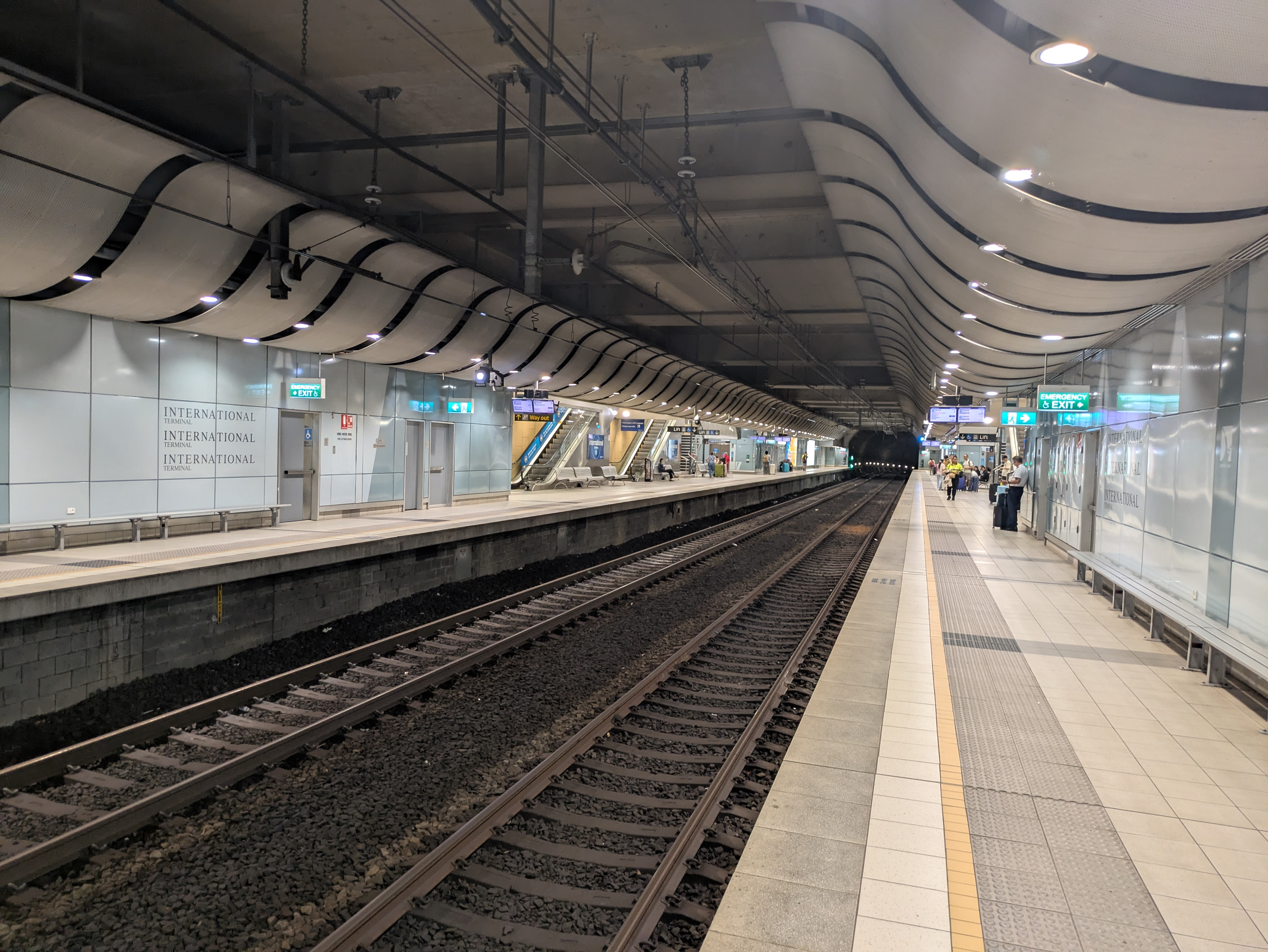
- View of the Airport Line as it runs through International Airport station in 2026

Overview
- Other name(s): Airport Line, New Southern Railway
- Owner: Transport Asset Manager of New South Wales (tunnel and one station); Airport Link Company (four stations)
- Termini: Central; Wolli Creek
- Stations: 5

Service
- Operators: Sydney Trains (trains and one station); Airport Link Company (four stations)
- Rolling stock: T, M, A and B sets

History
- Opened: 21 May 2000

Technical
- Line length: 10 km (6.2 mi)
- Num of tracks: 2
- Character: Underground railway
- Track gauge: 1,435 mm (4 ft 8 1/2 in) standard gauge
- Electrification: Overhead 1500 V DC
- Operating speed: 80 km/h (between stations); 60 km/h (at stations)

New South Wales Metropolitan Rail Area with Airport Link highlighted in green.

The Airport Link (also known as the Airport Line or New Southern Railway) is Sydney's inner-southern railway line connecting Sydney Airport to the central business district and the south-western suburbs of Sydney. With the exception of Wolli Creek, the Airport Line stations are operated by a private company, the Airport Link Company, as part of a public private partnership. The contract, which expires in 2030, allows the company to charge a surcharge on top of the normal fare. The line is served by Sydney Trains T8 Airport & South line services.

== Alignment ==
The Airport Link includes a four-kilometre rock tunnel and a six-kilometre soft ground tunnel. The tunnel is 23 metres (75 ft) below the earth's surface.

For most of its length, the line travels underground. It runs south from platform 23 at Central station across a viaduct to the tunnel portal beneath Prince Alfred Park near Chalmers Street. The tunnel roughly follows George Street underneath the suburbs of Redfern and Waterloo. At Green Square station, beneath the intersection of Botany Road, Bourke Road and O'Riordan Street, the line continues beneath Bourke Road to Mascot station, a block south of Gardeners Road.

From Mascot, the line roughly follows O'Riordan Street before turning sharply to the west once underneath Sydney Airport. The line runs westward under the Domestic and International terminals before continuing north-west underneath the Cooks River to reach the surface at Wolli Creek where it joins the East Hills line. The line is two tracks for its entire length.

The two new stations which were built for the airport's International and Domestic Terminals, feature larger lifts and wider ticket barriers to cater for passengers with baggage. Three new suburban stations were built – one each for the residential development areas of Mascot and Green Square, and an interchange station with the Illawarra line at Wolli Creek.

== Construction ==
In 1990, the State Government called for Expressions of Interest to build a line to the airport. In July 1994, the Government announced it had entered a public private partnership with Australian investment company Transfield Services and French construction company Bouygues to build the line. Under the deal, a private company, Airport Link Company, would cover the costs of building four of the stations. In return it would operate those stations for 30 years and have the right to impose a surcharge on fares for their use. The company's involvement was predicated on passenger estimates and train reliability guarantees that later proved to be optimistic. The State Government would fund (and own) the railway itself and Wolli Creek station.

Construction began on 12 February 1995 with a view to improving facilities for air travellers ahead of the 2000 Summer Olympics. At the time, the main public transport link between the city and its airport were two Sydney Buses express routes, the 300 to Circular Quay and 350 to Kings Cross branded as Airport Express.

A tunnel boring machine was used for the construction. Manufactured by the German firm, Herrenknecht, it arrived in Australia in October 1996. While the use of a Tunnel boring machine relieved the need for large numbers of workers at increased pressure, a caisson system is formed at the cutting head. Workers entering this space for inspection, maintenance and repair had to be trained. Medical direction was utilised for planning compression and decompression, assessment of fitness to dive, training of workers and lock operators, health monitoring of workers and treatment of related injuries. This project was the first time oxygen decompression tables were used for caisson work in Australia. The incidence of decompression illness was 1 case in every 286 pressurisations (0.35%) and this problem affected 5.9% of the workers.

In conjunction with the construction of the new line, the section of the East Hills Line between Wolli Creek Junction and Kingsgrove was quadrupled. Once this was opened, the running patterns of the trains on the lines changed. The flying junctions interchange near Central station was altered to give the Airport line its own platforms (21 & 23) at Central. Local (all stations) trains generally were timetabled to run from East Hills via the airport, peak hour express trains from Campbelltown run along the original route via Sydenham, taking the express tracks between Kingsgrove and Wolli Creek Junction.

== History ==
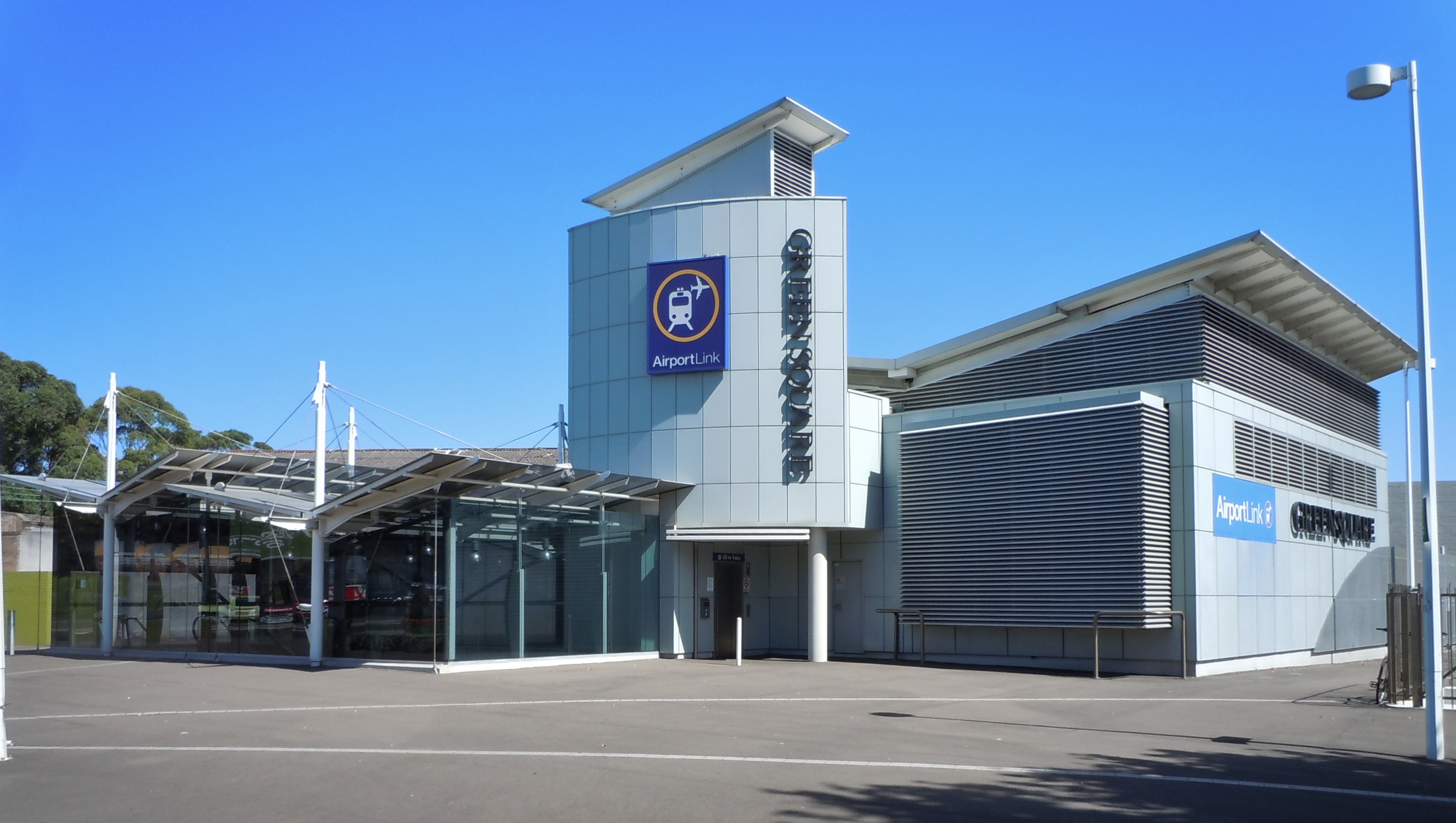
Green Square railway station

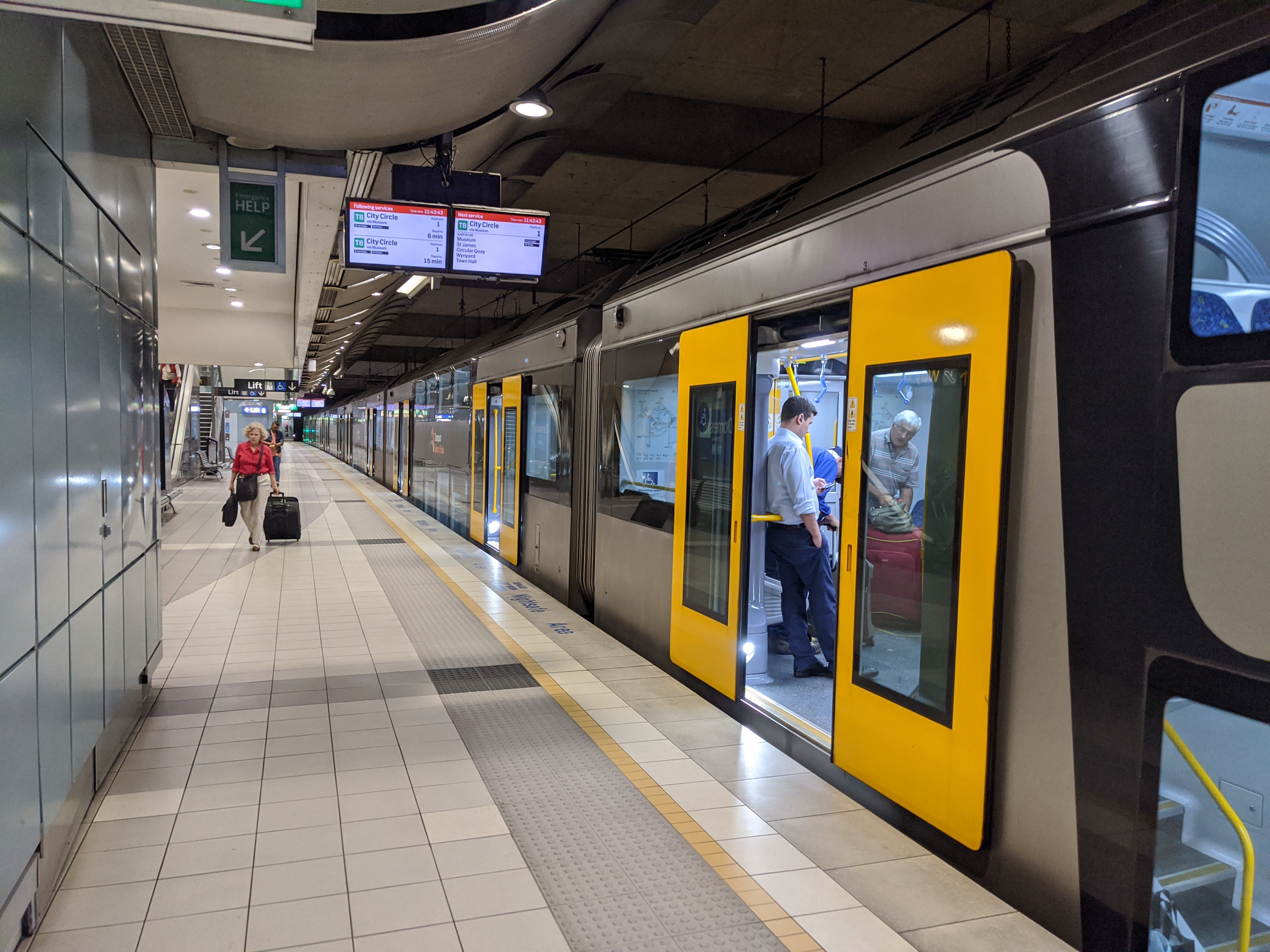
A Sydney Trains B set at Domestic Airport Station

The line opened on 21 May 2000, three months ahead of the Olympic Games, after the State Government had spent around A$700 million on the project and the Airport Link Company over A$200 million. As the stations commenced operation on 21 May 2000, the ownership of the four stations reverts to the state government on 21 May 2030.

Despite the cancellation of the rival Airport Express bus service, taxi surcharges and expensive airport parking, the Airport Link consistently failed to meet patronage targets. Less than a year after the line opened, the State Rail Authority stated that "patronage has been lower than expected to date", but they remained optimistic, believing "that as airport users become more familiar with this facility and the ingrained habits of many years gradually alter, patronage will continue to increase."

In January 2001, the Airport Link Company went into receivership, exposing the government to costs of around A$800 million. State Rail blamed "lower than expected patronage" and stated it was working with the company to increase it. Together with the Cross City Tunnel, the Airport Link served to dampen government and business enthusiasm for further public private partnerships in transport in New South Wales.

In October 2005, the Government and the company signed a revised agreement on revenue and patronage, settling the latter's claims against the former. The Government paid A$34 million to the company, with another A$73 million due as CityRail earns revenue from Airport Line business.

The Airport Link Company was put up for sale in early 2006, and was purchased by Westpac. In 2009, the business made a profit of A$5.8 million which increased to A$9.3 million in 2010. In 2013, Westpac's 49.9% stake was purchased by Universities Superannuation Scheme (USS), who then took control of the Airport Link Company.

=== Station access fees ===
From opening, all stations on the line charged a station access fee to use the line, as well as the standard fare. In March 2011, it was announced that the NSW Government would cover the cost of the station access fee at Green Square and Mascot stations, meaning that passengers no longer need to pay a surcharge to access these stations. To compensate the Airport Link Company, the Government pays the company a "shadow" station usage fee at a fixed contracted rate of approximately A$2.08 per entry and exit of these stations.

Following the removal of the access fee, patronage at Green Square and Mascot increased by 70 percent between March and June 2011 as a result of the reduced fares. A fee remains in place for the Domestic and International Airport stations. Workers at the airport do not receive a discount on the station access fee, rather, their fares are capped at $21.

By 2018, Green Square and Mascot stations were experiencing overcrowding at peak times due to significant increases in patronage. At Mascot station, passenger numbers increased by 117% between 2015 and 2019, and the station was expanded in 2023 to deal with the increased demand.

Under the service concession arrangement between the Airport Link Company and the Transport Asset Manager of New South Wales, the Airport Link Company has a concession to build, operate and maintain four stations on the Airport Line until 2030 and TAM will take over operation of the stations in 2030.

The 30-year public–private partnership will end on 20 May 2030, at which point the infrastructure will belong to the NSW Government.

TAM currently pays the shadow station access fee to the Airport Link Company. This amount is based on the entry and exit numbers at Mascot and Green Square stations, and the total contractual obligations totalled $279.331 million in 2024-25.

It has been agreed as between TAM and Sydney Trains that all annual train service fees net of shadow station access fees and other costs would be transferred from TAM to Sydney Trains to fund the provision of train services for future years. In 2024-25, $64.923 million was paid from TAM to Sydney Trains.

== Criticism ==
From the beginning, a major criticism of the line was that it is not served by dedicated rolling stock. Customers entering the Sydney Airport Line at Domestic and International must compete for space with commuters from the East Hills line particularly in the morning peak citybound, and find that the trains have no special provision for their luggage. Services are provided by Sydney Trains M, A and B set fleets.

This contrasts with Brisbane's Airtrain line which is primarily serviced by Queensland Rail's IMU and NGR fleets, both of which make provision for luggage carrying passengers, as well as offering additional passenger comforts such as high backed seats, free Wi-Fi and toilets. Furthermore, the Brisbane line terminates at the airport, bypassing most suburban stations, meaning customers travelling on the Airtrain are not mixed with suburban commuters. While Perth's Airport Link also shares some of the same issues as Sydney, with the B-series trains not having provision for baggage, users of the line are not charged an additional fee to alight at either of the stations servicing Perth's airport.

Although often perceived as all revenue going to the Airport Link Company, under the revenue sharing agreement, 85 percent of revenues raised by the access fee since August 2014 goes to the NSW Government. From 2015 to 2018, the NSW Government received $197.6 million in total net revenue from the station access fee.
