= Wolli Creek railway station =

Railway station in Sydney, New South Wales, Australia

Wolli Creek
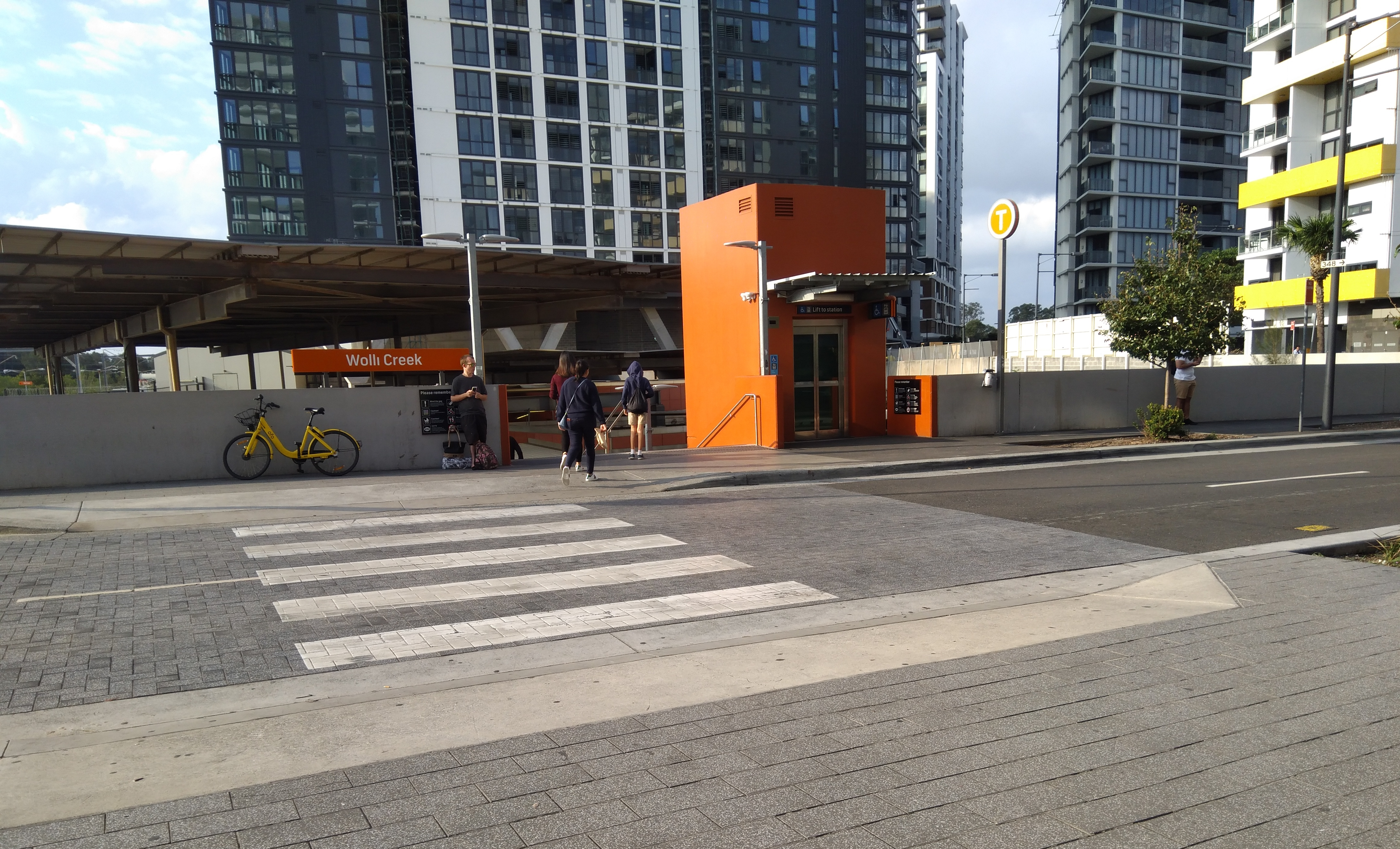
- Station entrance, April 2018

General information
- Location: Brodie Spark Drive, Wolli Creek; Australia
- Coordinates: 33°55′42″S 151°09′14″E
- Owner: Transport Asset Manager of New South Wales
- Operator: Sydney Trains
- Lines: Airport; Illawarra
- Distance: 7.30 kilometres (4.54 mi) from Central
- Platforms: 4 (2 side, 1 island)
- Tracks: 6
- Connections: Bus

Construction
- Structure type: Ground; Below ground
- Platform levels: 2
- Accessible: Yes

Other information
- Status: Weekdays: Staffed: 6am to 10pm: Weekends and public holidays: Staffed: 6am to 10pm
- Station code: WOC
- Website: Transport for NSW

History
- Opened: 21 May 2000

Passengers
- 2024: 5,399,299 (year); 14,752 (daily) (Sydney Trains, NSW TrainLink)

Services
Preceding station	Sydney Trains	Following station
Arncliffe towards Waterfall or Cronulla	Eastern Suburbs & Illawarra Line	Tempe towards Bondi Junction
Rockdale towards Waterfall or Cronulla	Eastern Suburbs & Illawarra Line	Sydenham towards Bondi Junction
Hurstville towards Waterfall or Cronulla	Eastern Suburbs & Illawarra Line Peak hours only	Sydenham towards Bondi Junction
Turrella towards Revesby or Macarthur	Airport & South Line Local	International Airport towards City Circle
Revesby towards Macarthur	Airport & South Line Express	International Airport towards City Circle
Preceding station	Intercity Trains	Following station
Hurstville towards Kiama	South Coast Line	Redfern towards Central or Bondi Junction
Hurstville towards Kiama	South Coast Line (limited morning and evening services)	Sydenham towards Bondi Junction
Excursion runs
Preceding station	East Coast Heritage Rail	Following station
Sutherland towards Moss Vale	The Cockatoo Run	Central Terminus
Location

Wolli Creek railway station is located at the junction of the Airport and Illawarra lines, serving the Sydney suburb of Wolli Creek. It is served by Sydney Trains' T4 Eastern Suburbs & Illawarra Line, T8 Airport & South Line services and Sydney Trains South Coast Line services.

== History ==
Wolli Creek station was built as part of the Airport line opening on 21 May 2000. The name derives from a local creek branching from the Cooks River, and Wolli Junction is the name of the original junction point for the East Hills line from the Illawarra line at this site. In the initial concept for the Airport Line, no station was to be provided at this site, however the State Rail Authority decided to construct a station here as an interchange point with the new Airport line and the Illawarra line.

The station, unlike the others built on the line, was constructed with government finance and hence is owned by the Transport Asset Manager of New South Wales. In the initial concept and design phase, the station was named North Arncliffe, however this was changed to Wolli Creek in 1998. During construction, a set of points allowing the cross-over of trains from the Illawarra local lines to the Illawarra main lines was moved further south.

A secondary motivation was to promote urban renewal around the station site. The station is located on a former industrial site and siding, and the area around the station was occupied by light industrial businesses when the station opened. Since the station's opening, the suburb has been significantly redeveloped with high density housing. As part of this development, the Airport line platforms have been partially covered over.

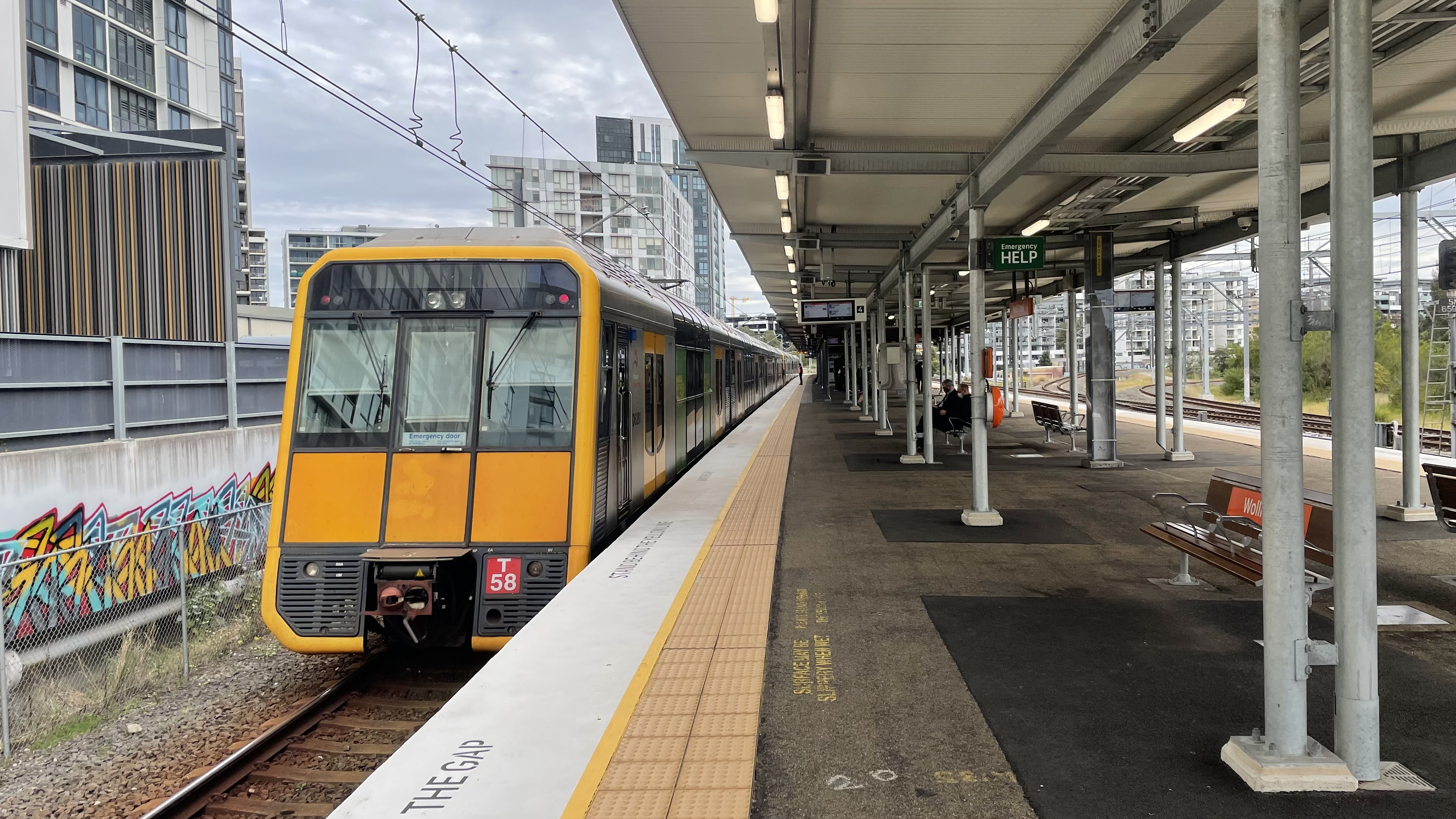
Tangara on Platform 4

== Platforms and services ==
Platform	Line	Stopping pattern	Notes
1	Airport & South Line	services to Central & the City Circle via the Airport	
2	Airport & South Line	services to Revesby & Macarthur; 2 weekday evening peak services to Campbelltown	
3	Eastern Suburbs & Illawarra Line	services to Bondi Junction	
3	South Coast Line	services to Central & Bondi Junction	
4	Eastern Suburbs & Illawarra Line	services to Hurstville, Cronulla & Waterfall	
4	South Coast Line	services to Wollongong, Dapto & Kiama	

== Transport links ==
Transit Systems operates one bus route from Wolli Creek station, under contract to Transport for NSW:

- 348: to Prince of Wales Hospital

== Trackplan ==
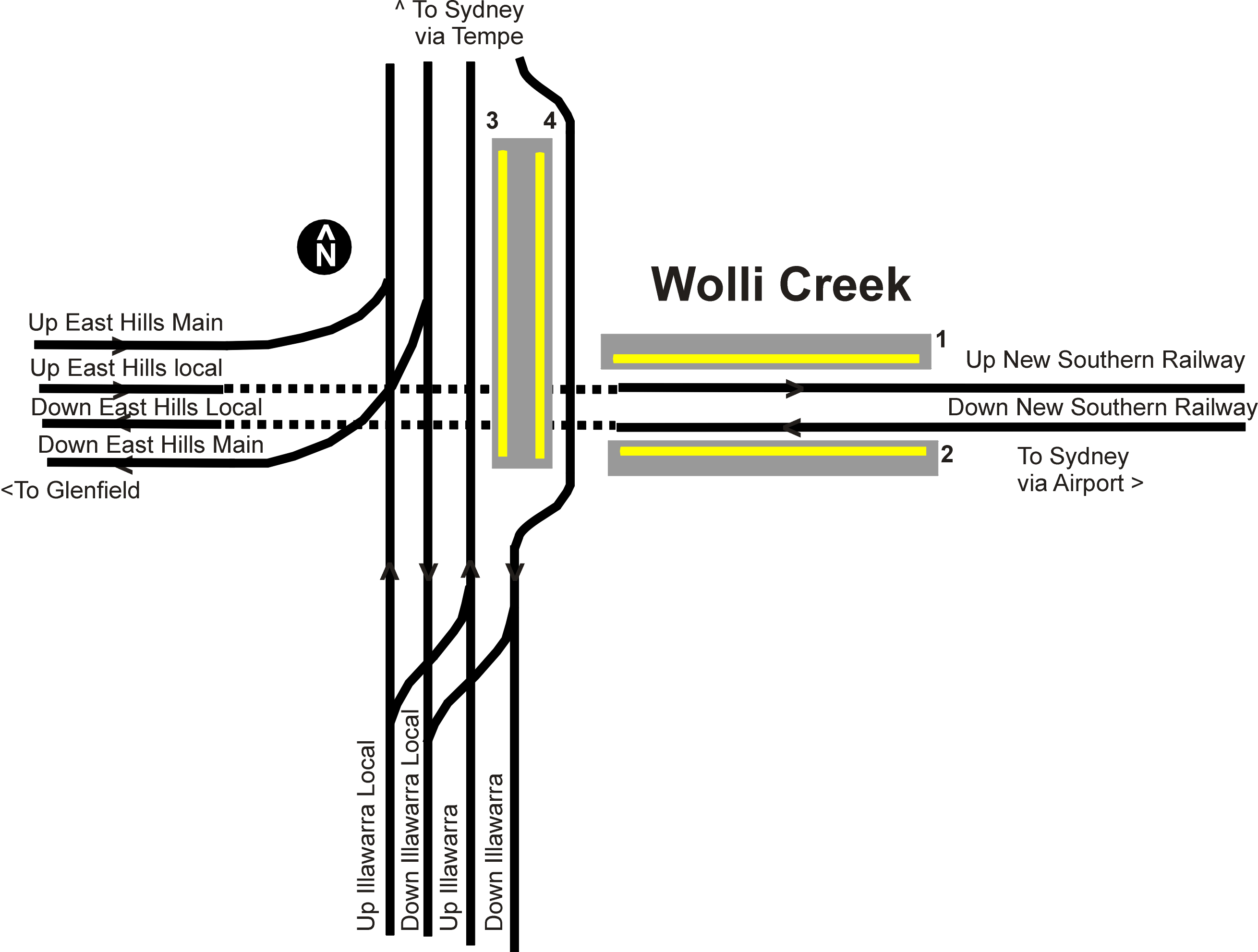
Track arrangement at Wolli Creek
