= Railway Institute Building =

Railway Institute building
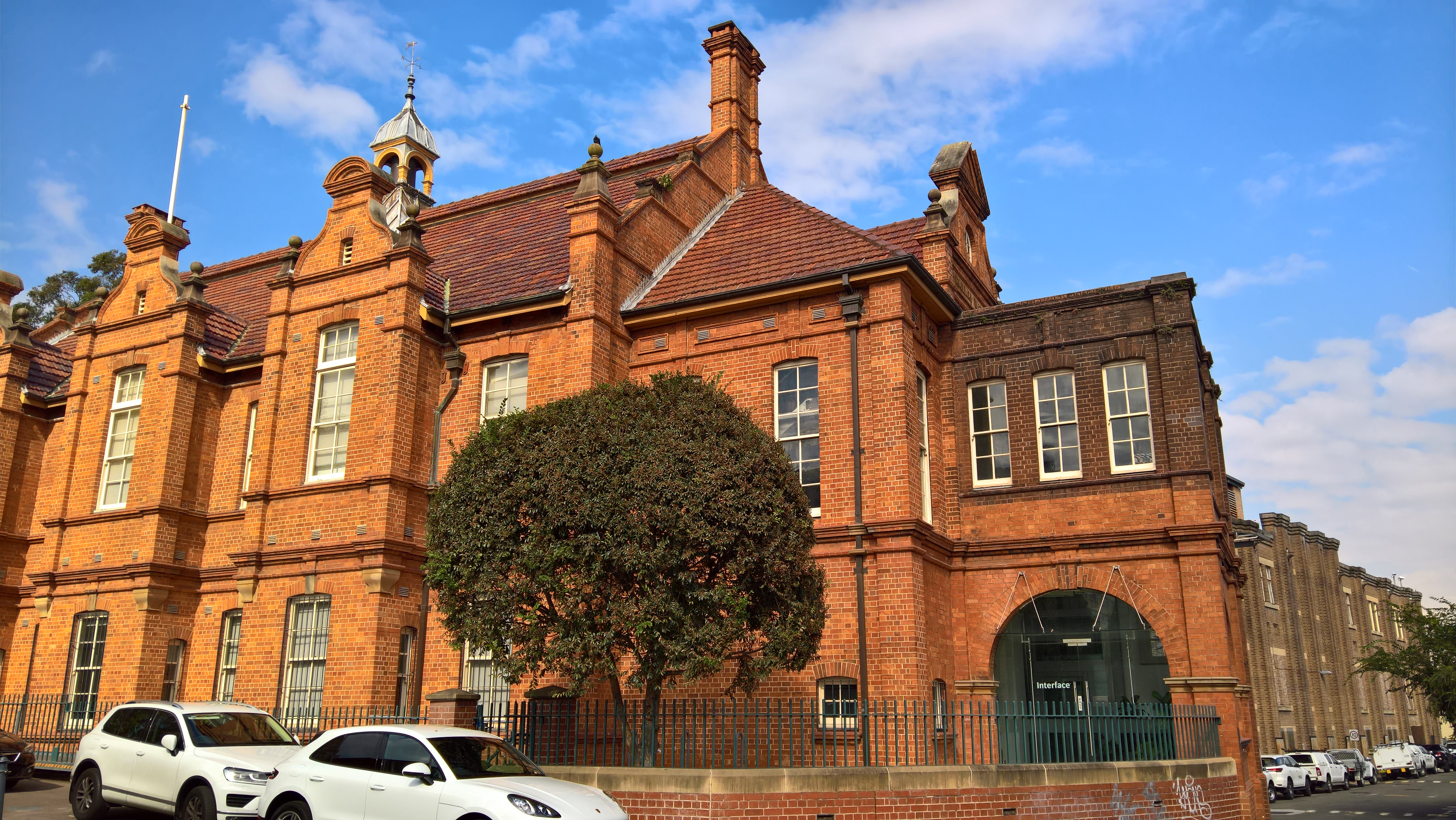
- Railway Institute Building

- Location within Sydney Location within Australia
- 33°53′09″S 151°12′23″E
- Location: 101 Chalmers Street, Surry Hills, Sydney Australia

History
- Built: 1891–1898

New South Wales Heritage Register
- Official name: Railway Institute Building; Institute Building
- Type: State heritage (built)
- Designated: 2 April 1999
- Reference no.: 1257
- Type: Other – Transport – Rail
- Category: Transport – Rail

The Railway Institute Building is a heritage-listed former educational facility and social venue at 101 Chalmers Street, Surry Hills, Sydney, Australia. It was built from 1891 to 1898. It is also known as the Institute building. It was added to the New South Wales State Heritage Register on 2 April 1999.

== History ==
=== Early history of the locality ===
In the early years of the nineteenth century the area around what is now Prince Alfred Park and the infrastructure of Central railway station was undeveloped land known as the Government Paddocks. Amongst the early grants in this locality were those made to Charles Smith which consisted of over four hectares (nine acres) straddling what is now Chalmers Street and was roughly bounded by the present day Cleveland and Elizabeth Streets, and the large grant made to William Redfern. Smith's grant was known as Cleveland Gardens, and by the early 1820s it was owned by the merchant Daniel Cooper. Cooper erected Cleveland House, which still stands, in 1824 to the design of architect Francis Greenway. It was not, however, the first building in the locality, for the Benevolent Asylum was erected in 1820-21 at the direction of Governor Macquarie at what would become the corner of Pitt and Devonshire Streets. The "turnpike house" was a short distance away.

Development of a rather different nature was also initiated by Governor Macquarie when he ordered the consecration of the Devonshire Street Cemetery. This took place on 27 January 1820. A brick wall was erected before any interments took place to enclose its four acres. Within a four year period the cemetery was expanded by the addition of seven acres to its south. A road was formed along the southern boundary of the cemetery in the first half of the 1830s and was called Devonshire Street. The Government Paddocks, which were also known as the Cleveland Paddocks, were on the other side of the new street.

Recommendations issued by Earl Grey, the Secretary for State, in regard to the establishment of railways in the colonies, were adopted by the Legislative Council of NSW on 18 August 1849.

On 11 September 1848 the Sydney Tramroad and Railway Company was formed, with the object of constructing railways to Parramatta and Liverpool, and eventually extensions to Bathurst and Goulburn. As the new Act allowed for railways to be constructed by private companies, the Sydney Tramroad and Railway Company was incorporated as the Sydney Railway Company at the end of 1849. The site of the railway station at Sydney was located within the Cleveland Paddocks, granted on an application made to the government on 6 December 1849. At a spectacular ceremony held on a rain 3 July 1850 the daughter of Governor Charles Fitzroy, the Honourable Mrs Keith Stewart, turned the first sod in the Cleveland Paddocks. The grant application made in December 1849 was finally approved on 13 December 1853. However, the Sydney Railway Company ran into financial troubles and so was purchased by the government, and on 3 September 1855 its administration was vested to the government through a Board of Commissioners. In September 1856 the railway line between Sydney and Parramatta was officially opened.

On 22 December 1865 the remaining eastern portion of the Cleveland Paddocks was dedicated as a reserve for public purposes and name Prince Alfred Park in commemoration of the visit by the Duke of Edinburgh to the Australian colonies in 1868.

=== Education of the working classes ===
The movement towards the formation of the Railway Institute began with the arrival in Sydney of fifty four Scottish mechanics, their families and four clergymen who were to respectively build and teach at the Reverend Dr John Dunmore Lang's Australian College. They landed in Sydney around 1832. One of the teachers, Reverend Henry Carmichael, acting at the instigation of Governor Bourke, did much to found the Sydney School of Arts in 1833. The School of Arts was intended to give mechanics a firm knowledge of the theory behind their craft, which extended to classes in arithmetic, geometry, algebra and "anything else that might make a working man able to become a freer and more privileged human being, as well as a more efficient worker". Knowledge was to be disseminated by volunteers such as professionals from the Church, legal, medical and teaching professions. Facilities included a library with a reading room and a type of scientific museum containing apparatus, models of machinery and of recent inventions. Premises were erected at 277A Pitt Street c. 1836 and extended over the years. The building still stands.

By 1841 there were 800 members at the School of Arts but numbers declined as the decade passed. Its fortunes revived after the arrival of the Reverend Dr John Woolley in July 1852 to become the first Principal and Professor of Classics at the University of Sydney. He also became Vice President of the School of Arts and lectured at it, and was crucial in turning it into a useful teaching institution.

From the middle of the century Schools of Arts and Mechanics Institutes were set up in towns across the state. There was one in Wollongong by 1861, whilst a School of Arts was opened in Dubbo in 1874, Bega in 1875 and Newcastle in the same year. By 1880 there were seventy six across New South Wales. They were run by ambitious and well meaning townspeople who were endeavouring to give the working man education and some culture. Classes tended to be small, however, and a common pattern was observed whereby the original founding zeal faded and attendances became sporadic. What were sources of pride in many towns became social centres rather than educational facilities or else survived as lending libraries. Nevertheless, it is indicative of the place that the institutions held in the community that Sir Henry Parkes urged the federation of the Australian colonies at a public meeting held at the Tenterfield School of Arts in October 1889, and by 1900 there were well over one thousand around the country.

Evidently in the first half of the 1880s the NSW Railway Commissioners had made promises to provide an institution for railway employees, large numbers of whom were too far away to take advantage of the nearest Mechanics Institute or School of Arts. This echoes the precedent established in Great Britain in the nineteenth century, where the railway companies provided a Mechanics Institute for the improvement of their employees' education in the numerous towns which were associated with the railways or actually developed by them. The latter process started at the end of the 1830s and Mechanics Institutes were an integral and early component of the towns. For instances, in the town of Swindon it was, apart from the parish church, the most important building and the centre of its social and cultural life for almost a century after its establishment in 1844. The companies also built facilities such as hospitals, schools and parks. It appears that railway employees were aware of the benefits offered by the institutions for seven fettlers and a ganger stationed alongside the railway line to Tenterfield challenged the Commissioners to act on their promise at the beginning of 1885.

An inaugural meeting of a provisional committee was held on 10 December 1888 and the objects and contents of the Railway Institute were set up. These were subsequently revised in March 1889:

"The intellectual improvement of its members and the cultivation of literature, science and art. To be promoted by the maintenance of lectures, classes for instruction in reading, writing, arithmetic, drawing and the encouragement of social, intellectual and physical recreation and by such other means as the Council may from time to time deem advisable. No political or religious subject shall be introduced at any of its meetings."

=== The Railway Institute and its building ===
Of course, new premises were required to house the new institute and so a competition was held at the end of 1889 with a promise of A£50. It was won by the architect H. M. Robinson of Pitt Street, Sydney. Although there is little documentary material readily available on Robinson, he was responsible for a variety of residential and other projects at the end of the 1880s and into the 1890s. In 1887 he designed premises for the P. P. Investment Co. at 379 George Street in association with architect J. Tosh, who had offices in the same building as Robinson. In addition to the Railway Institute, other projects included a villa in St Marles Road, Randwick (1887), the second placed entry in the NSW State House Competition (1888), extension s to St Jude's Church at Randwick (1888), alterations and additions to "Hillside" at Coogee (1889), a series of tramway waiting rooms at Hyde Park and Moore Park in Sydney (1890), an entry into the Hawkesbury Agricultural College Competition of 1891, and extensions to a pavilion at the National Park at Audley (1892).

Robinson's building for the Railway Institute was:

"...designed in the revived eighteenth century style of architecture known as Queen Anne, or free classic, a style which has been prevalent in England and in London particularly, during the past 18 years; its popularity being attributable to its great suitableness to modern brick buildings. The building is to be constructed with brick walls, faced preferably with bricks of a paler red colour than is usual in the style; and the roofs at an angle of 45deg. [sic] are to be covered with dark-red plain tiles. The design thus carried out will be as effective and picturesque as could be obtained for the limited cost..."

This was amongst the earliest instances of the Queen Anne Style as well as a very early instance of the use of terracotta roof tiles. These, imported from France, only became popular at the very end of the 1880s.

Plans and elevations of the Railway Institute were inspected on 21 February 1890 by the committee at the instigation of its chairman, who also stated that there was a sum of A£4,000 set aside in addition to A£1,000 donated by Mr Goodchap. Charles Augustus Goodchap (1837-1896) arrived in Sydney in 1853 and joined the railway branch of the Department of Public Works in 1859. He became chief clerk for railways, the secretary in 1875 and commissioner of railways on 29 January 1878. The management of the railways improved under his jurisdiction, and some of the innovations that he instigated included interlocking points and signalling, the so-called "absolute block" system of signalling, and construction of large maintenance and repair workshops, and the training of employees in first aid for the Railway Ambulance Corps. His reputation was damaged by a feud with engineer-in-chief John Whitton and his administration hampered by political pressures. In the setting up of the Railway Act, 1888, a corporate body of three commissioners was set up to manage the railways and detach them from political interference. Goodchap resigned on 27 October of that year because he was not appointed one of the three commissioners. Railway workers collected a subscription for his retirement as a response to concerns for their welfare, which reflected his paternalistic administration - in 1882 he had initiated investigations into the educational and benefit schemes available to European railway workers and had established the Railway Ambulance Corps in 1885. The A£500 that he received from the railway workers was donated towards the setting up of a library which formed the nucleus of the Railway Institute.

Tenders were invited in February 1890 for the erection of the building, and the contract was signed with builder Thomas Henley on 9 April 1890. Later that month a circular prepared at the recommendation of the committee noted that the Institute itself was to be "worked upon similar lines" to the Railwayman's Institute at Crewe in England, thus acknowledging its English precedents.

As documented, the building comprised a large lecture hall with stage and platform on the first floor and a Class Room, Reading Room, Coffee Room and Smoking Room disposed along a central corridor. An entry porch and stair hall were at one (western) end of the building whilst a caretaker's bedroom, kitchen, scullery and escape stair were at the other (eastern) end. A tarpaulin shed on the site was demolished to make way for the new building, which ended up costing A£3,600, significantly less than the A£5,000 allowed for it. Progress was slower than anticipated, but in October 1890 it was decided to seek permission to install electric lighting as well as gas. The Commissioner did not approve the variation.

In January 1891 some minor modifications were approved. Correspondence received by the Committee from the Commissioners allowed "...of tiling the Porch & erecting Ladies' w.c. and asphalting yard & also removing gates into Goods yard and extending dwarf wall and railway along the side of building."

On the evening of Saturday, 14 March 1891, the Railway Institute building was formally opened, "...when the interior presented a most attractive appearance, being profusely adorned with floral decorations and Chinese lanterns. The lecture hall was crowded with railway employees, every branch of the service being represented, and among the visitors on the platform were the Hon. Sir Henry Parkes, G.C.M.G., Colonial Secretary and Premier; the Hon. W. McMillan, Colonial Treasurer and Minister for Railways; Mr E. M. G. Eddy, Chief Railway Commissioner... Mr C. A. Goodchap, M.L.A., ex-Commissioner for Railways...Professor Selman of the Sydney Technical College...the others, including many leading citizens who had taken an interest in the movement." It was the first Railway Institute to be opened in Australia.

That the Institute was a great and immediate success is borne out by alterations and additions made to it within ten years of its opening. A small Ladies Retiring Room was documented in July 1891 and constructed behind the stage in the first floor Lecture hall. Six years later, the Council of the Railway Institute approached the Commissioners at the beginning of 1897 "with a view to taking in a portion of Prince Alfred Park for the purpose of extending the building along Castlereagh Street". After deliberations with the Sydney City Council a small portion of the Park was obtained "for a consideration". Extensive two storey additions including a new entry at the corner of Castlereagh and Devonshire Street, a flat, smoking room, "general room" and an additional ladies retiring room, reading room and spacious lecture hall were documented by the Government Architects Office. This reflected the "great use made of the Institute", the large numbers of classes and lectures held and the problems in co-ordinating them. Indeed, "on several occasions accommodation was obtained outside, the whole of our large building being in use". The cost of these grand extensions exceeded available funding due to a decline in railway revenue. However, a revised scheme was prepared in the middle of 1898 and was complete by July. The documentation for the additions was prepared by the Railways Department, the architect being W. H. Davidson. They were constructed by messrs Adamson and Daw and officially opened on 14 March 1899. The additions contained two class rooms, a smoking room, council room, secretarial room and a large hall. The caretaker's quarters were enlarged and the older building "renovated and generally well-appointed". The smoking room must have satisfied a long felt need, as the original one had been taken over when the library had been enlarged earlier in the decade.

In 1897 a Royal Commission was established to decide on a new railway terminal site. Alternative proposals were prepared and on 7 June 1900 a NSW Parliamentary Standing Committee adopted the proposal to locate it on the northern side of Devonshire Street. The City Railway Extensions (Devonshire Street) Act was proclaimed on 11 December 1900. The Devonshire Street Cemetery was removed to make way for the new terminal and relocation of monuments and remains was begun in 1901 and by June of that year work had begun on forming the site. Construction of the first stage of the station began in June 1902. Devonshire Street effectively disappeared between Castlereagh and George Streets with the construction of the Devonshire Street pedestrian subway beneath the station infrastructure between 1903 and 1906. Castlereagh Street was renamed Chalmers Street and connected to Elizabeth Street by a new section of roadway along the eastern side of the station.

During 1905 the stage and scenery in the hall was remounted and lighting upgraded, and a gymnasium constructed within the area formed by the two buildings, on the southern part of the site. Drawings show that it was proposed to construct this in the ground floor of a rectangular three storey building, with classrooms on the two upper levels, but another drawing shows a simple structure with classrooms on the two upper levels, but another drawing shows a simple structure with a corrugated iron roof. Photographs published in 1909 show it to have subsequently demolished during the 1920s. In September 1905 a Jubilee Celebration Exhibition was staged within and adjacent to the Institute buildings, commemorating the fiftieth anniversary of the NSW Government Railways.

The building continued to suffer the strain of demands for accommodation, both social and educational and so the Council submitted a proposal for extensions to the Chief Commissioner at the end of 1908. It has not been ascertained what these may have entailed and whether they were built. During the next decade, however, alterations and additions were made to the building's fabric. The sitting room and bedroom of the caretaker's flat in the 1899 building were opened up into one space to form a classroom in 1916, and between 1917 and 1919 new works included the construction of a new stair at the western end of the 1891 building in the porch, necessitating the construction of another storey over it. A gallery was constructed above the main hall on the first floor, along with dressing rooms and an access balcony along the eastern and northern sides of the building. The proscenium on the stage of the main hall was also moved forward to the edge of the stage. In 1918 documentation was prepared converting the small hall in the 1899 building into a library with an associated office. Two years later a proposal for an orchestra pit in front of the stage in the main hall was also documented, and in 1924 masts for an aerial extending over the 1899 building were detailed.

In the middle of the 1920s extensive works were undertaken in and around Central Station in association with the construction of the railway extensions into the city centre. The gymnasium was demolished, as were other nearby structures used by the Institute:

Alterations in connection with the lines which will link up with the City Railway necessitated the demolition of old Sydney goods station. The original goods shed had been for some years the site of the departmental tarpaulin factory, and the offices were occupied by the teaching and examing [sic] sections of the Institute. As Institute business had quite outgrown the capacity of the main building, it was necessary to look for new premises in a convenient location, and Opera House Chambers, in Hay Street, have been obtained.....The whole of the classes previously conducted at the main Institute, Central Station, and Newtown Depot will now be accommodated on the first, second and third floors of the Opera House Buildings, the library is on the fourth floor, and on the fifth are the offices of the Director and his officers, including the staff examiners and the safe-working instruction room.

It is not intended to do away with the old Institute building, which has served its purpose faithfully and well since 1893 [sic]. The hall will still be used for entertainments, and the various affiliated musical and other societies will continue to meet there. In addition, the rooms will be available for meetings of other Service organisations which, with much reluctance, it had been necessary for some time past to turn away owing to so many other calls on the limited space.

The enormous growth of the Institution during the past six years made it imperative to provide increased accommodation. As the building could not be extended sufficiently to meet even present requirements, it was thought advisable to get into premises where as many activities as possible would be under on roof.

The move occasioned by the growth of the Railway Institute reflected its expansion in other parts of the State. After the reorganisation following its revised Constitution of 1919, a large number of Institutes were set up or revitalised in country areas; and these were also open to the general public. The first branch of the Railway Institute had been established in Newcastle as early as 1895 but only gained its own building in 1917 and other subsequent branches were opened between 1916 and 1922 across the state. In fact, the Newcastle Institute was sufficiently well patronised to establish an orchestra in 1917 and a male choir in 1926. Premises set up by the Railway Institute included five bankrupt school of arts that were taken over.

Even with new premises the Institute was still operating at its full capacity. In 1925 there were 759 pupils for technical subjects and 995 more for departmental and commercial courses. Nearly 3,000 employees were also enrolled in correspondences courses. In 1927 efforts were underway to reconstruct the Museum within the Main Institute building...and already a good collection of exhibits has been obtained. The cooperation of the staff generally in furtherance of the project is desired, and any exhibits in the form of correspondence, books, or other documents relative to the early days of the Railways, as well as models, appliances and apparatus of historical significance, will be gratefully accepted either as gifts for or exhibits on loan to the Museum.

The NSW Railway and Tranway Institute Musical and Elocutionary competition was inaugurated in 1912 and became recast as an Eisteddfod in 1922. In 1933 the City of Sydney Eisteddfod was set up and also made use of the Institute's halls. Possibly as result of this the drop scene was relocated above the stage of the main hall in 1936. Since that time few alterations were documented for the building. In 1941 toilets were proposed for existing spaces across from the small hall, but do not appear to have been constructed. Clearly even accommodation away from the Institute building was inadequate, for by 1943 the Institute was also providing additional lecture rooms in the Wills Building in Sydney.

In 1947 sketch plans were prepared for an entire new building to replace the existing premises, and this was serious enough to warrant the acquisition of a new site:

...Notification was received that the Devonshire Street Railways Institute building would be demolished within a year. Inconsequence, a new site was resumed adjacent to the Dental Hospital in Devonshire Street and plans were well advanced for the premises that are to take the place of the old building.

Needless to say, the new building did not eventuate, although alterations to the entrance gates to the existing building were documented to assist in the transportation of transformers. Minor changes were carried out in the late 1950s and early 1960s, including the installation of a kitchen at the south western corner of the 1899 building and refurbishment of toilets plus alterations to the entry porch at the western end of the 1891 building. The last eisteddfod was held in the building in 1971.

In 1975 the Railway Institute was relieved of its role as a training facility, and was returned to Devonshire Street. The small halls became library space, carpet was laid, and the roof retiled. by 1995 the building was large used as office space for Institute staff, the Welfare Officer and several other groups. It was also hired to various railway groups and the general public. By the early 1990s the exterior of the building had deteriorated to such an extent that State Projects Heritage Group were engaged by Rail Estate to document repair and maintenance work to it. This was carried out in 1995 and included brick repointing, replacement and cleaning, stone replacement and repair, joinery repair and replacement, roof repairs and in one part rebuilding, stormwater drainage and new rainwater goods, and replacement of the lantern ventilator. The work was carried out by the government Architects Office in association with Conrad & Gargett and was of sufficient quality to receive a recommendation for conservation by the Royal Australian Institute of Architects (NSW Chapter) in 1996. At this time it was proposed to convert the Institute building into a management training centre for State Rail personnel, and sketch drawings were prepared by State Projects at the beginning of 1996. However, this proposal was not developed further. In 1998, the building was unoccupied; in 1999, it was sold to private developers, and is currently leased as commercial office space.

== Description ==
=== Exterior fabric ===
The Railway Institute building remains generally as it was during the 1920s. The stages of expansion which were undertaken in the first thirty years of its operation are clearly evident on its exterior and are defined by architectural style and materials employed for each stage.

The original two storey section, completed in 1891, was designed in what has become termed the Federation Anglo-Dutch style, although early descriptions of the building were cognisant of its Queen Anne origins. The Queen Anne style arose out of a reaction to the Gothic idioms which dominated English architecture in the second quarter of the nineteenth century. This reaction dominated English architecture in the second half of the nineteenth century. This reaction began in the 1860s with the work and thinking of important figures such as William Morris and Philip Webb. Architects and designers began to examine other historical periods of architecture and even foreign cultures in an effort to find new inspiration, and this included a reassessment of the vernacular architecture of England and the Low Countries, particularly the way "in which more modest seventeenth and eighteenth-century builders...interpreted the Classical styles". One of the most distinctive characteristics of this new style, which was named Queen Anne, was a truthful use of materials, and the most characteristic material was red brick. It emerged in domestic architecture at the end of the 1860s and by the mid 1870s was also appropriated for commercial architecture. One notable group of buildings which made much of the style were commercial architecture. One notable group of buildings which made much of the style were schools erected by the London School Board from the 1870s to the 1890s. These domestically scaled and detailed buildings were successful because they were inexpensive to build, attractive and picturesque, and easily recognisable, whilst being constrained by tight budgets and generally small sites – all attributes of the Railway Institute buildings.

The style did not appear in Sydney until the second half of the 1880s. Amongst the very first Queen Anne buildings erected here was a residence designed by English architect Maurice B. Adams and local architect Harry Kent known as "Caerleon", designed in 1886 and built at Bellevue Hill. An "Anglo Dutch" Queen Anne building was completed at about the same time. This was a brick office building at 16-18 O'Connell Street designed by architects Coward and Bell, completed in 1888 and demolished almost exactly fifty years later. Its exterior characterised the style - red brick, white painted timber window joinery, shallow pilasters with projecting triangular piers planted onto their surfaces and, perhaps most typical of all, a series of brick Flemish gables to form a picturesque skyline at parapet level.

The style appears to have been prevented from becoming widespread in New South Wales because of the depression of the 1890s which seriously restricted building activity. However, apart from the Railway Institute building, several other notable examples have survived to the present day, including the former Woods Chambers in Scott Street, Newcastle, Santa Sabina Convent, Strathfield and the Municipal Building, Hay Street, Sydney.

The Railway Institute building incorporates many distinguishing characteristics of the Federation Anglo-Dutch style, such as red brickwork, Flemish gables, shallow pilasters, moulded bricks and picturesque massing. The condition of the exterior fabric generally reflects the extensive works undertaken several years ago to it and in some cases, such as rainwater heads embossed with numerals, new fabric is clearly distinguished from old. The 1899 section was constructed in a more simple idiom than the 1891 building, although brick type and detailing closely matched the earlier structure. Its vernacular scale and details, such as the timber gable screen, are similar to the residential architecture of the period. Its external fabric also shows evidence of having conservation work carried out on it in 1995.

Early twentieth century works associated with the main hall on the first floor of the 1891 building are still apparent. The stair at the western end of the building is visible through the arched window of the former porch, and the first floor addition over is distinguished by brickwork of a different tone and a flat roof. The access passage and ancillary spaces behind the stage are clad in asbestos cement shingles and have been painted a dark colour to minimise their visual impact on the building.

=== Interior ===
The interior of the building is generally in less good condition than the exterior. The presence of termites at the western end of the 1891 building and the southern end of the 1899 building is of particular concern.

There is much surviving early fabric throughout the building, some of which has been concealed behind later linings. This is most evident in the main hall, where timber dados and the front of the gallery have been covered over. There are no surviving chimney pieces or hearths, and only remnants of tessellated tiles in the main entry of the 1891 building.

=== Landscape and setting ===
Early photographs show that the Railway Institute building was enhanced by planting. At the time that the 1899 building was completed, tall shrubs grew behind the palisade fence along Devonshire Street and trees in Prince Alfred park formed a backdrop to the new addition. Planting was still in evidence, in a somewhat altered form, in 1919 when trees grew close to the 1899 addition.

At the present time the building is set off by the palisade fence and areas of grass on the Chalmers Street side. Planting is confined to the eastern and southern boundaries. It comprises privet, abelia, ochna and swamp mahoganies along the eastern boundary, and privet and a grevillea robusta on the southern boundary. The age of the swamp mahoganies is thought to be fifty years old, although the privets may date to the 1920s.

The building is a landmark in the locality. This is particularly so from the west, where its distinctive architecture and colour stand out across the railway lines. However, from other vantage points the building has become obscured. Views of it along Chalmers Street are particularly blocked by the substantial street trees which line the kerbs, whilst a combination of trees and ungainly lavatory structures in Prince Alfred Park prevent an appreciation of its important contribution to that public space. The northern side of the building is visually disrupted by the entrance to the Devonshire Street pedestrian subway and by trees and fencing associated with the pedestrian area to the north.

== Heritage listing ==
The Railway Institute is culturally significant for the following reasons:

It is historically significant as the first Railway Institute building to be erected in Australia, and an important educational facility at the end of the nineteenth and during the twentieth century.

The 1891 section of the building is a rare and fine example of the Federation Anglo Dutch style, demonstrating a high degree of architectural quality and detail, particularly on its exterior. Later additions complement this original portion in scale and quality of materials.

The building is an important known example of the work of architect Henry Robinson.

The building has rare technical significance because it is an outstanding and relatively intact example of a Railway Institute building and demonstrates the activities which were carried out in association with adult education in the late nineteenth and early twentieth centuries.

The building has representative social significance arising out of its seminal role as a railway institute and is still valued by a section of the community.

The Railway Institute building was listed on the New South Wales State Heritage Register on 2 April 1999 having satisfied the following criteria.

The place is important in demonstrating the course, or pattern, of cultural or natural history in New South Wales.

The Railway Institute was the first such institute in NSW and in Australia. It is an important and successful part of the history of technical and adult education in NSW, which began with the establishment of the Sydney School of Arts in 1833 and speared across the state during the rest of the nineteenth century. Its establishment also reflects the influence of English precedent whereby railway companies built Mechanics Institutes for the education of employees.

It has associations with prominent figures associated with the development of the railway during the nineteenth century, most particularly Railway Commissioners Goodchap and Eddy.

The building has played an important role in the cultural, recreational and social activities of Railway employees, and in the cultural life of Sydney. For instance, for many years it was the location of the city of Sydney Eisteddfod.

The physical fabric of the building reveals the rapid growth of the Institute and clear evidence of the ways in which the building was used for instruction and recreational purposes.

The building reflects the paternalistic and responsible attitude held by the management of the NSW Railways at the end of the nineteenth century, and the efforts of railway workers to achieve a higher level of education.

The place is important in demonstrating aesthetic characteristics and/or a high degree of creative or technical achievement in New South Wales.

The Railway Institute building is an example of the Federation Anglo Dutch style of architecture, with many characteristic features of the style such as the use of brickwork, Flemish gables, picturesque massing and decorative details.

It is a rare surviving example of the work of architect Henry Robinson, of whom little has been documented and whose known output is small. The quality of the building's exterior reveal him to have been an accomplished and skilful designer who was aware of the latest architectural trends.

The external fabric demonstrates a high degree of workmanship, both in intact surviving original sections and in recent conservation work.

The building is reputedly the first building in NSW connected with a government instrumentality to have been finished with a Marseille-pattern terra cotta tile roof. This significance, however, has been diminished by later replacement of the original roofing, resulting in the loss of important detail such as cresting.

The building has retained much of the early and original internal fabric and configuration. The main hall on the first floor of the 1891 building in particular is a fine space and has retained much original decorative fabric. It is considered to be a rare example of a small public hall from the late Victorian period.

The building is a most important part of the physical environment of the area, particularly in relation to Prince Alfred Park, Chalmers Street and the Central Railway complex. It has the potential to be reinstated as a prominent visual landmark that forms a positive component of the local townscape, but presently is obscured by small buildings and trees on three sides.

The place has a strong or special association with a particular community or cultural group in New South Wales for social, cultural or spiritual reasons.

The Railway Institute building is socially significant because of its strong associations with railway employees in the past in NSW, and apparently is still very meaningful to many older employees.

The place has potential to yield information that will contribute to an understanding of the cultural or natural history of New South Wales.

The building is significant because it is a fine example of its type, which is still evident despite later modifications. It provides evidence of the processes of adult education at the end of last century and in the first quarter of the twentieth century.
