= Sydney International Exhibition =

1879 Sydney
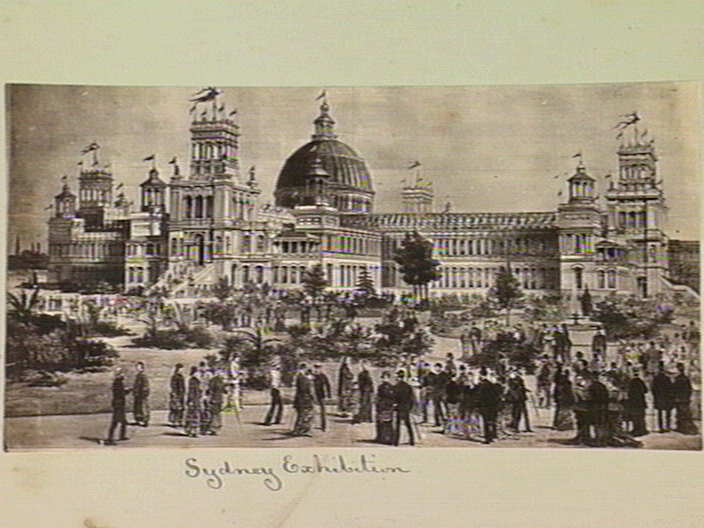
- The Sydney International Exhibition

Overview
- BIE-class: Unrecognized exposition
- Name: Sydney International Exhibition
- Building(s): Garden Palace
- Area: 6.1 hectares (15 acres)
- Invention(s): Elevator
- Visitors: 1,117,536 (paid = 850,480)

Location
- Country: Colony of New South Wales
- City: Sydney
- Venue: The Domain
- Coordinates: 33°51′52.56″S 151°12′46.55″E

Timeline
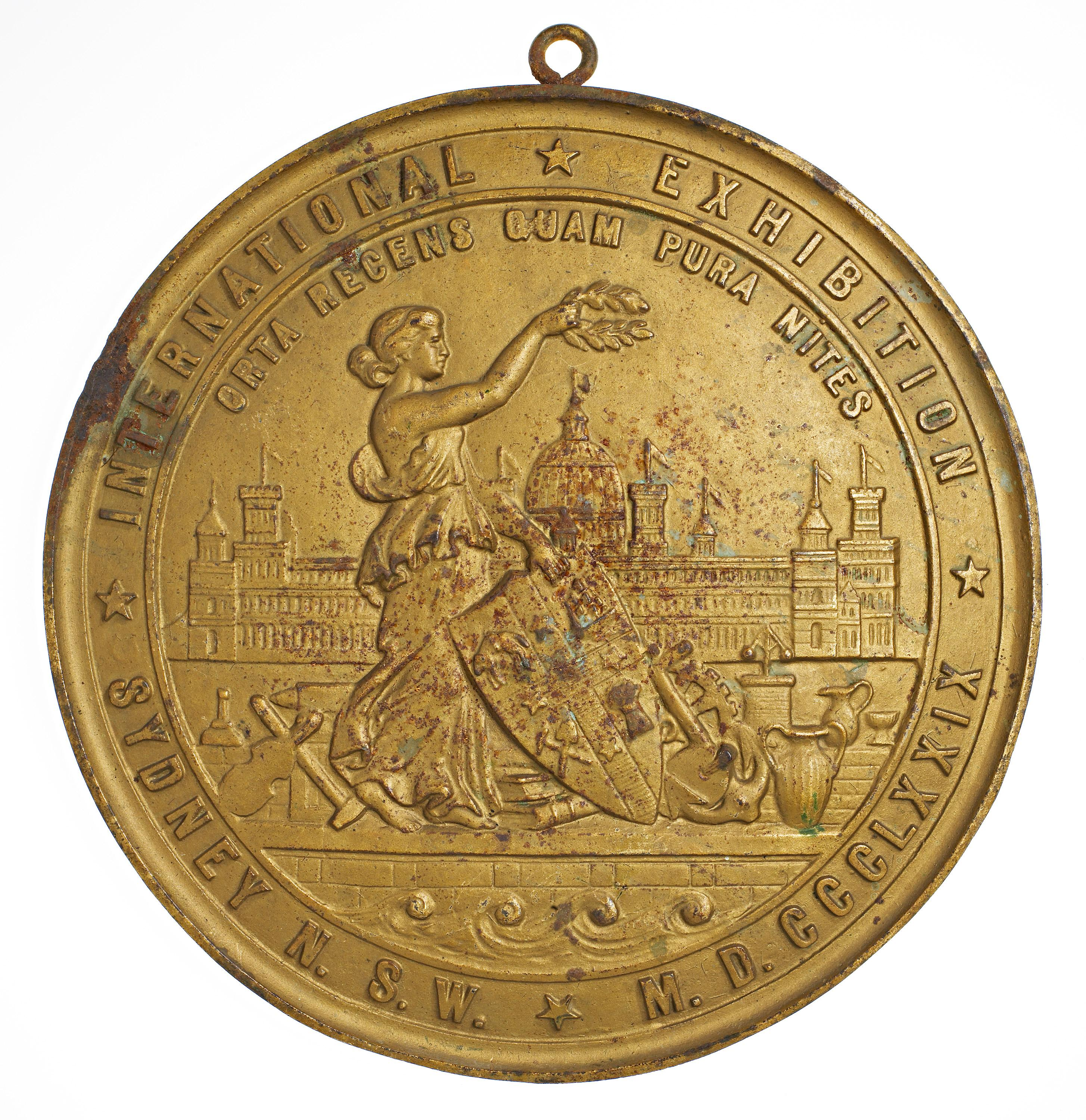
- Awarded
- Opening: 17 September 1879
- Closure: 20 April 1880

Universal expositions
- Previous: Exposition Universelle (1878) in Paris
- Next: Melbourne International Exhibition (1880) in Melbourne

Australian Exhibition Schottische
MIDI render composed 1879 by William Henry Smith (1859-1929) dedicated to Patrick Jennings for the Sydney International Exhibition

The Sydney International Exhibition was established headed by Lord Augustus Loftus and took place in Sydney in 1879, after being preceded by a number of Metropolitan Intercolonial Exhibitions through the 1870s in Prince Alfred Park.

== Organisation ==
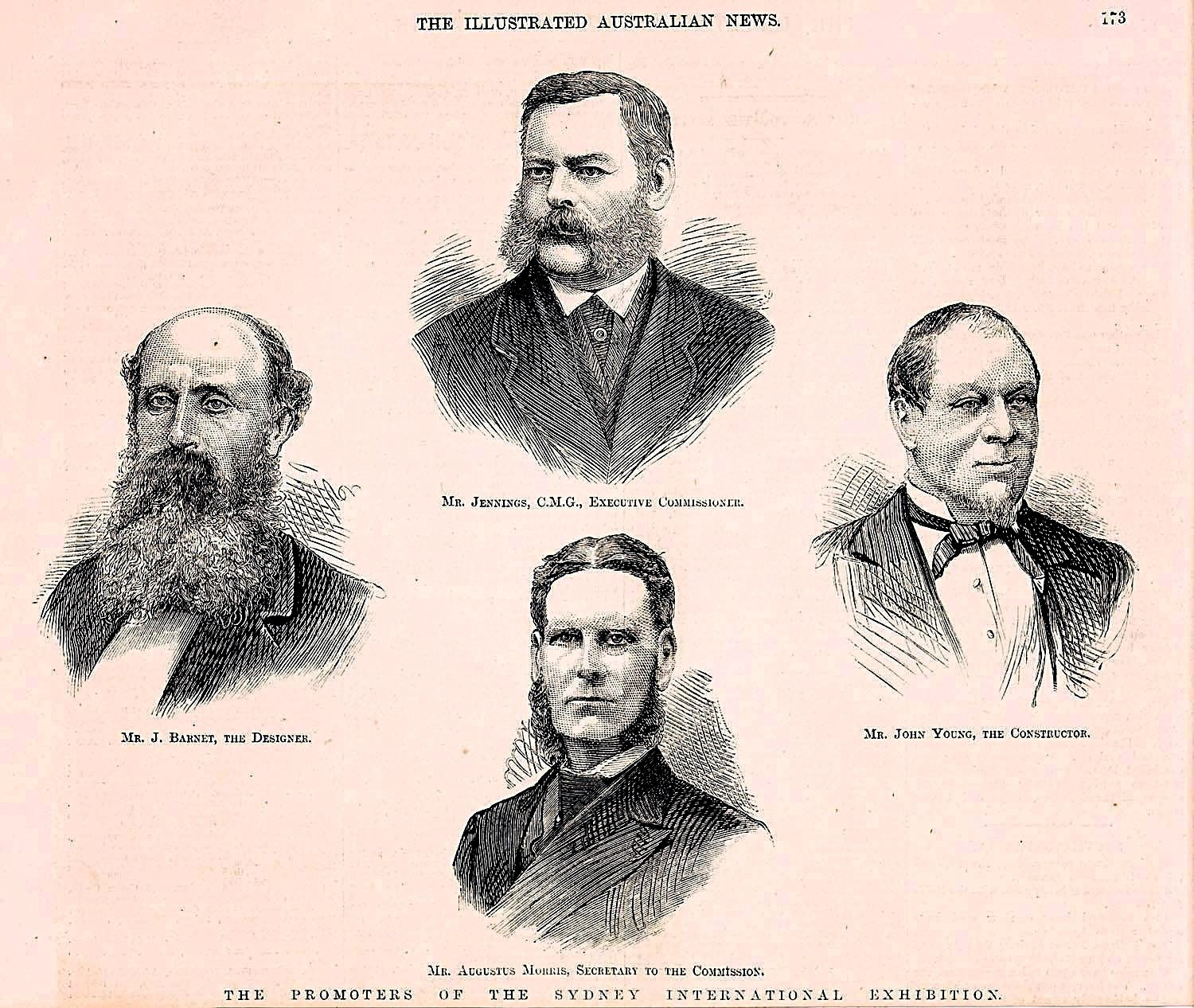
The Promoters of the Sydney International Exhibition

In late 1877, the Agricultural Society of New South Wales discussed the possibility of hosting an international exhibition in Sydney. Jules Joubert proposed importing the goods from the Universal Exposition in Paris in 1878 as a basis of the exhibition. On 31 December 1878, the Royal Commission for the Sydney International Exhibition was established headed by Lord Augustus Loftus.

== Architecture ==
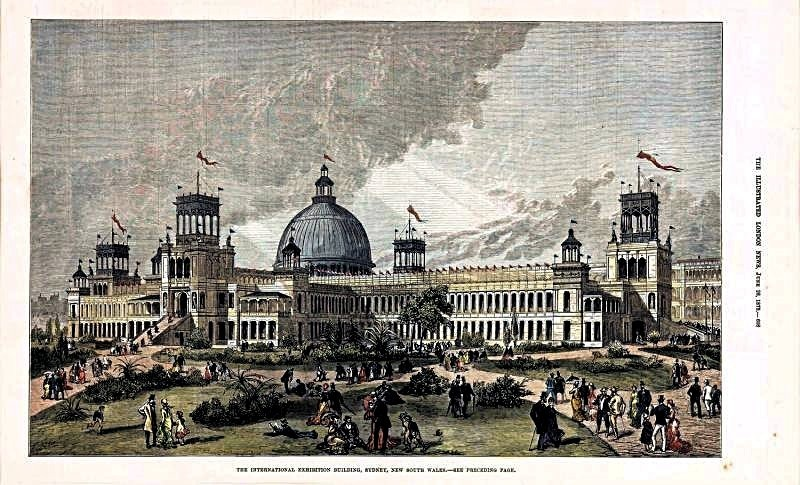
The International Exhibition Building, Sydney. 1879

A site of 35 acres (14 ha) on the high ground of the Inner Domain along Macquarie Street was chosen for the exhibition. James Johnstone Barnet designed a massive building called the Garden Palace. The nave of the building measured 800 x 60 feet and the transept ran for 500 feet. A large dome 100 feet in diameter rose 90 feet above the building. The builder, John Young, finished the building in just eight months at a cost of £191,800. International response grew so rapidly that in June 1879, construction began on two large machinery halls and an art gallery.

== Transport ==
Four steam tram motors were imported to Sydney and tracks laid from the Redfern railway station to the site. Intended as a temporary transport installation, this became the genesis of a larger tram network and probably the exhibition's most lasting legacy.

== International participation ==
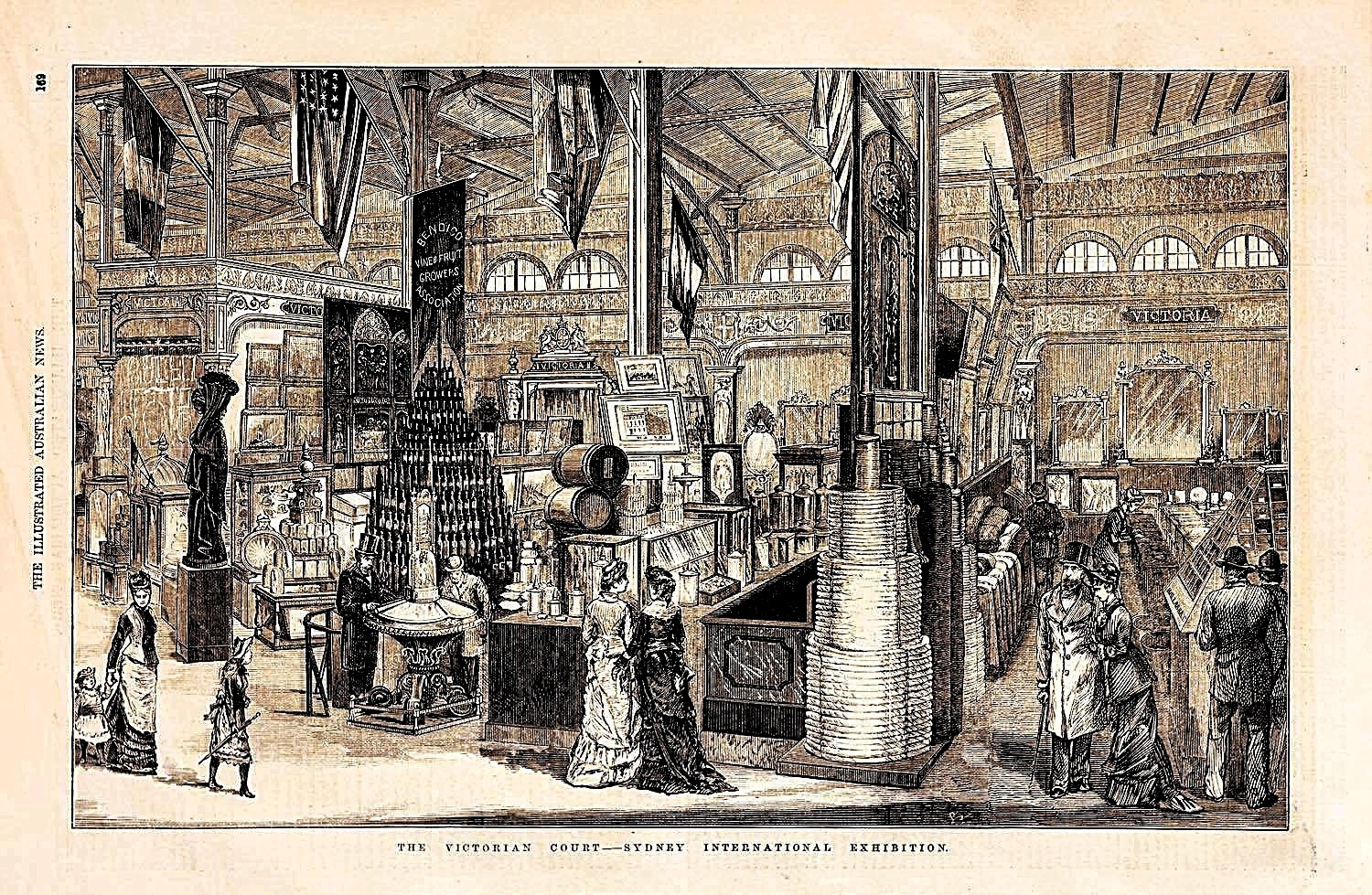
The Victorian Court

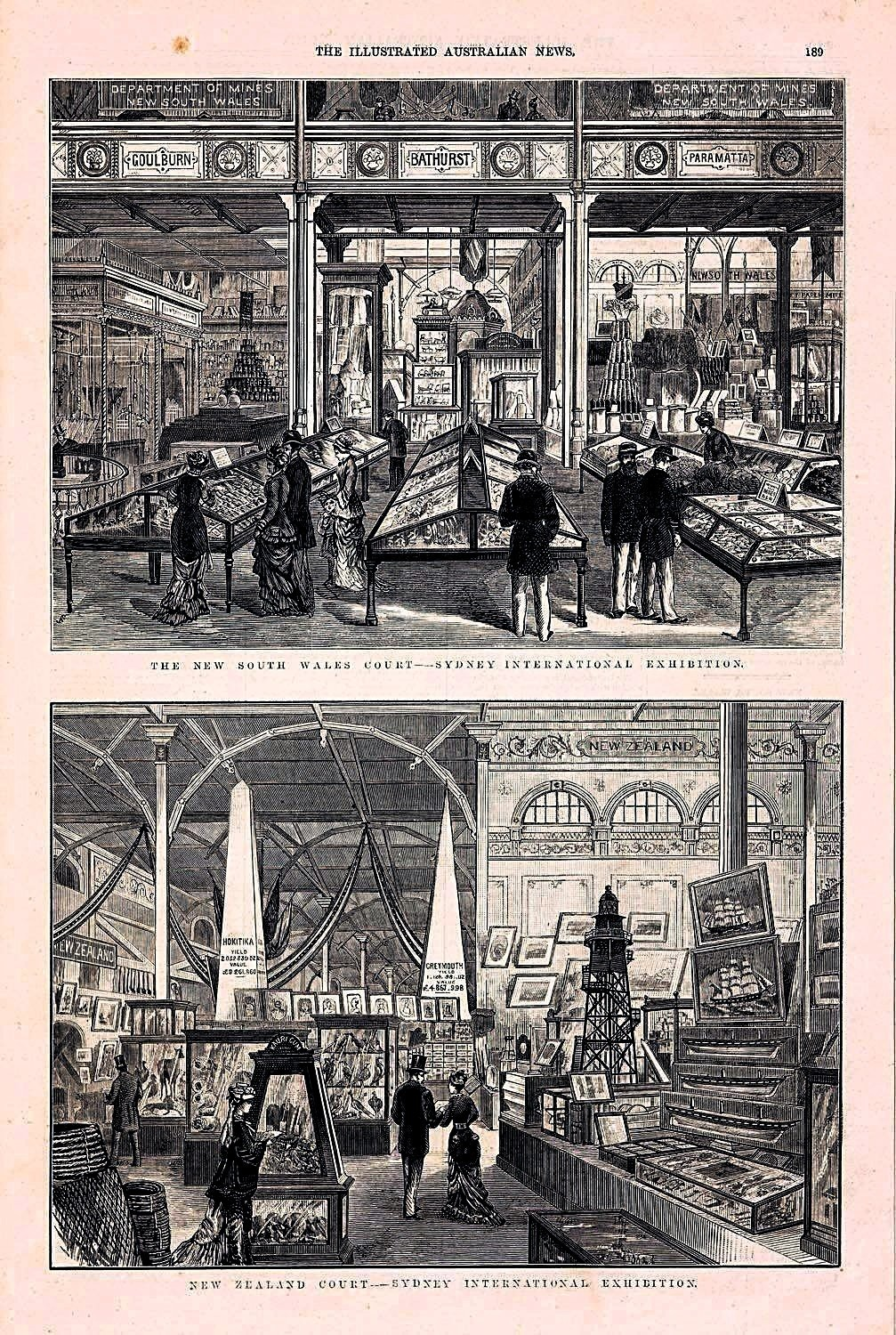
The New South Wales Court & New Zealand Court

There were 23 nations represented at the Exhibition. Africa: Cape Colony; America: Canada, United States; Asia: Ceylon, India, Japan, British Malaya, Singapore, Straits Settlement; Europe: Austria, Belgium, Denmark, France, Germany, Great Britain, Ireland, Italy, Netherlands, Switzerland; Oceania: Fiji, New Caledonia (France), New Zealand, and from the Australian continent, the colony of New South Wales, Colony of Queensland, Colony of South Australia, Colony of Tasmania, and the Colony of Victoria. There were 9,345 exhibitors providing about 14,000 exhibits.

After being granted self-governance during the 1850s, the Australian colonies, Victoria and New South Wales, saw a steady economic growth as result of the discovery and exploitation of gold reserves. After 20 years proposals were made for organising an exhibition modelled on the great exhibitions of Europe, with an aim to promote commerce and industry, along with art, science and education. In 1879 Melbourne filed a plan to the Parliament. However, Sydney wanted to be the first and managed to organise an exhibition in record time.

The Sydney International Exhibition opened in the autumn of 1879, but it wasn't really universal and therefore not officially recognised by the Bureau of International Expositions. Melbourne decided to start their exhibition shortly after the one in Sydney, so the participants could transport their exhibits during the winter of 1880. After the exhibitions many of the exhibits were selected to be displayed in the Technological, Industrial and Sanitary Museum (now the Powerhouse Museum). The Garden Palace itself was used by the government until a fire destroyed the building on 22 September 1882.

== See also ==
- History of Sydney
- List of world's fairs
