= Sydney Intercolonial Exhibition =

Series of exhibitions

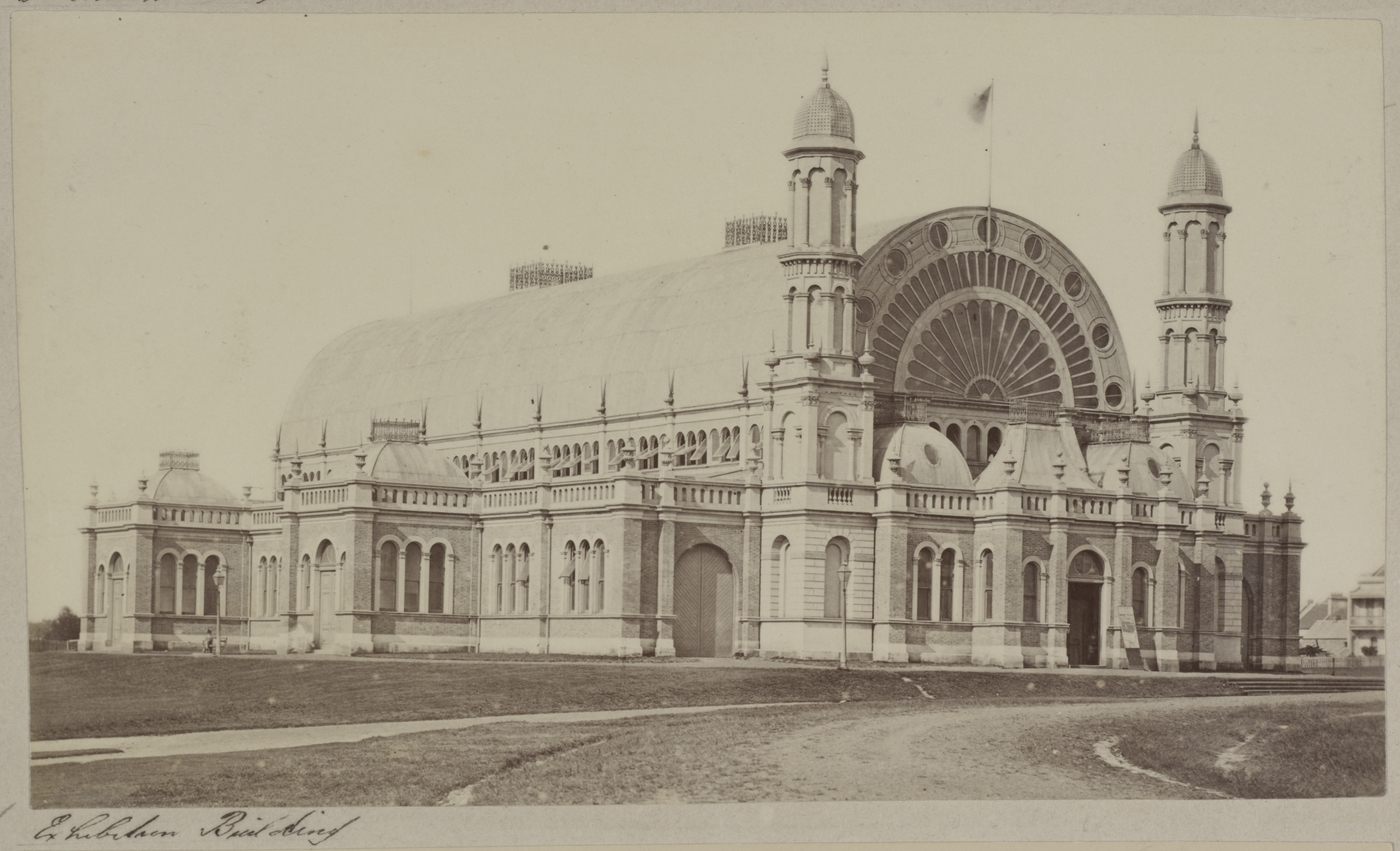
- The Sydney Intercolonial Exhibition building in Prince Alfred Park

Overview
- BIE-class: Unrecognized exposition
- Name: Sydney Intercolonial Exhibition
- Area: 6.1 hectares (15 acres)
- Invention(s): Elevator
- Visitors: 1,045,898

Location
- Country: Australia
- Venue: Prince Alfred Park, Sydney
- Coordinates: 33°53′17″S 151°12′18″E

Timeline
- Opening: 30 August 1870
- Closure: 30 September 1954

Universal expositions
- Previous: Intercolonial Exhibition of Australasia (1866) in Melbourne
- Next: Intercolonial Exhibition (1875) in Melbourne

The first Sydney Intercolonial Exhibition was a series of exhibitions inspired by the historic Great Exhibition held in London in 1851. The Colony of New South Wales mounted its first such exhibition in 1854 in preparation for the Paris Exhibition of 1855, another in 1861 in preparation for the London Exhibition of 1862, and then several more until being held annually throughout the 1870s under the name Metropolitan Intercolonial Exhibition.

The term "intercolonial" referred to the British colonies on the continent of Australia, which did not federate until 1901.

The major impetus for intercolonial exhibitions derived from the Agricultural Society of New South Wales, which from 1858 onwards sponsored annual shows at the Society's grounds at Parramatta, about 20 km (12 mi) west of the Sydney central business district. In 1869, the exhibitions underwent rapid expansion on relocation to the newly established Prince Alfred Park, Surry Hills, immediately south-east of the central business district. The Sydney Intercolonial Exhibition building opened in 1870 on the site.

Further expanding the scope of its exhibitions, Sydney held the first international exhibition, the Sydney International Exhibition, in the Garden Palace in The Domain in 1879.

== See also ==
- History of Sydney
- List of world's fairs
