= Sydney Dental Hospital =

Coordinates: 33°53′4″S 151°12′28″E

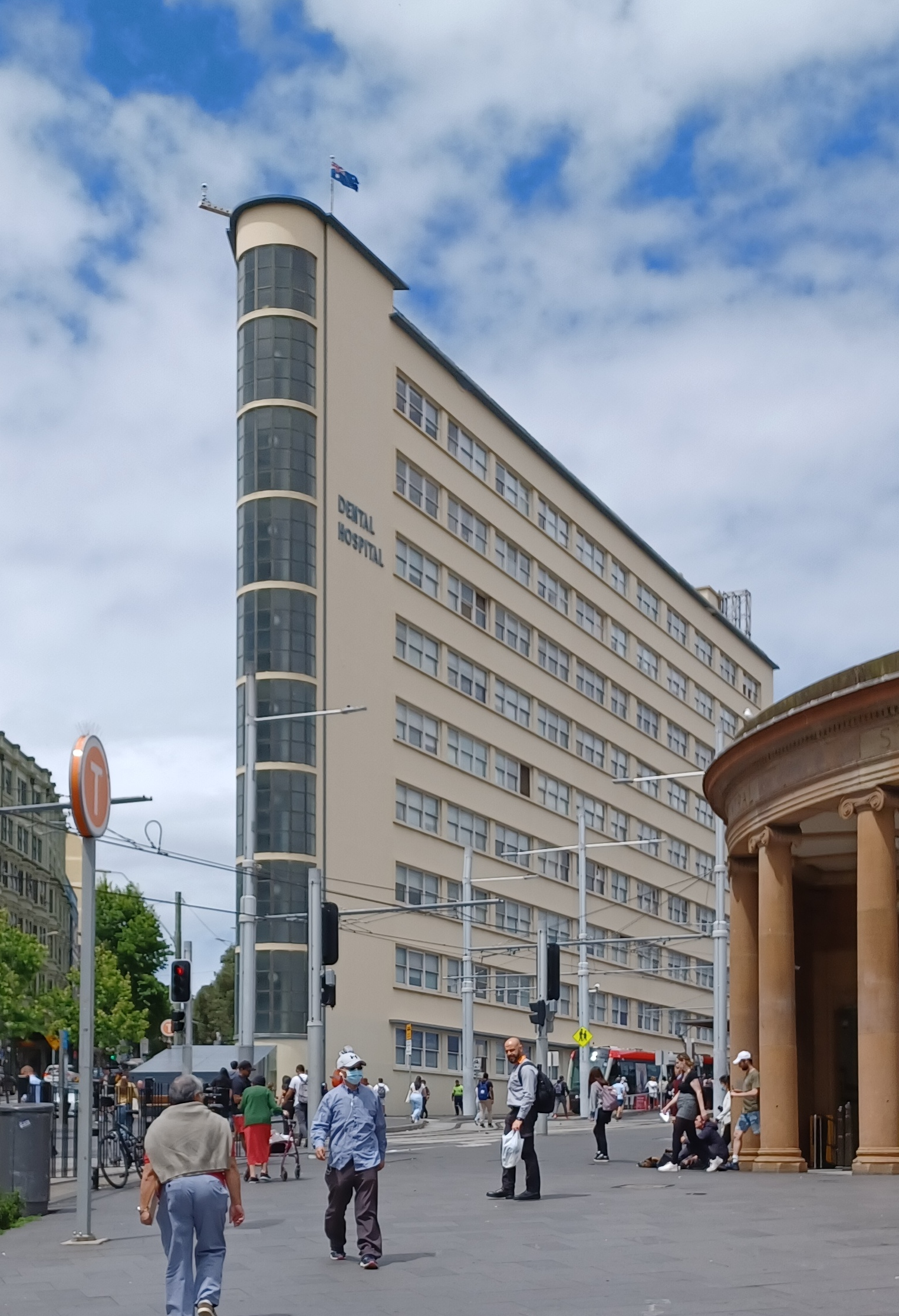

Geography
- Location: Sydney, New South Wales, Australia (Map)

Organisation
- Type: Teaching
- Affiliated university: University of Sydney

History
- Founded: 1901

Links
- Website: Official website

Sydney Dental Hospital (SDH) is in Sydney, New South Wales, Australia, in Surry Hills, between Chalmers Street and Elizabeth Street opposite the entrance to Central railway station.

SDH provides both specialist treatment and general dental services.

- Specialist treatment is provided to people referred statewide for Paediatric Dentistry, Orthodontics, Periodontics, Oral Surgery and Diagnostic Imaging, Prosthodontics, Endodontics, Oral Pathology, Oral and Maxillo-facial Surgery and Implantology services. The Special Care Dental Unit provides care to those with chronic mental health conditions and the elderly.
- General dental care is available without a referral to children (under 18 years old) and to certain vulnerable groups of adults, including indigenous Australians and those who meet certain government social security stipulations. General dental treatment is also provided by dental students of the University of Sydney within the Department of Clinical Dentistry & Simulation.

== History ==
The Sydney Dental Hospital, formerly "The United Dental Hospital of Sydney" was founded in 1905 under the Dental Hospitals Union Act 1904. Originally located in George Street, the State Government provided funds for the new hospital in Chalmers Street and the building was completed in 1912. The building that now houses the Sydney Dental Hospital was opened in 1940 for the dual purpose of providing modern and efficient treatment for those on low incomes, plus now additionally for those who are on Commonwealth Seniors Health Care and Pensioner cards, as well as a functional training ground for dental students at the University of Sydney. Designed by the Sydney firm of Stephenson & Turner, it is an early and notable Australian example of the Streamline Moderne style.

In 2016, the Sydney Dental Hospital celebrated serving the community for 110 years.
