= Chalmers Street =

Street in Sydney, Australia

Chalmers Street, Surry Hills New South Wales
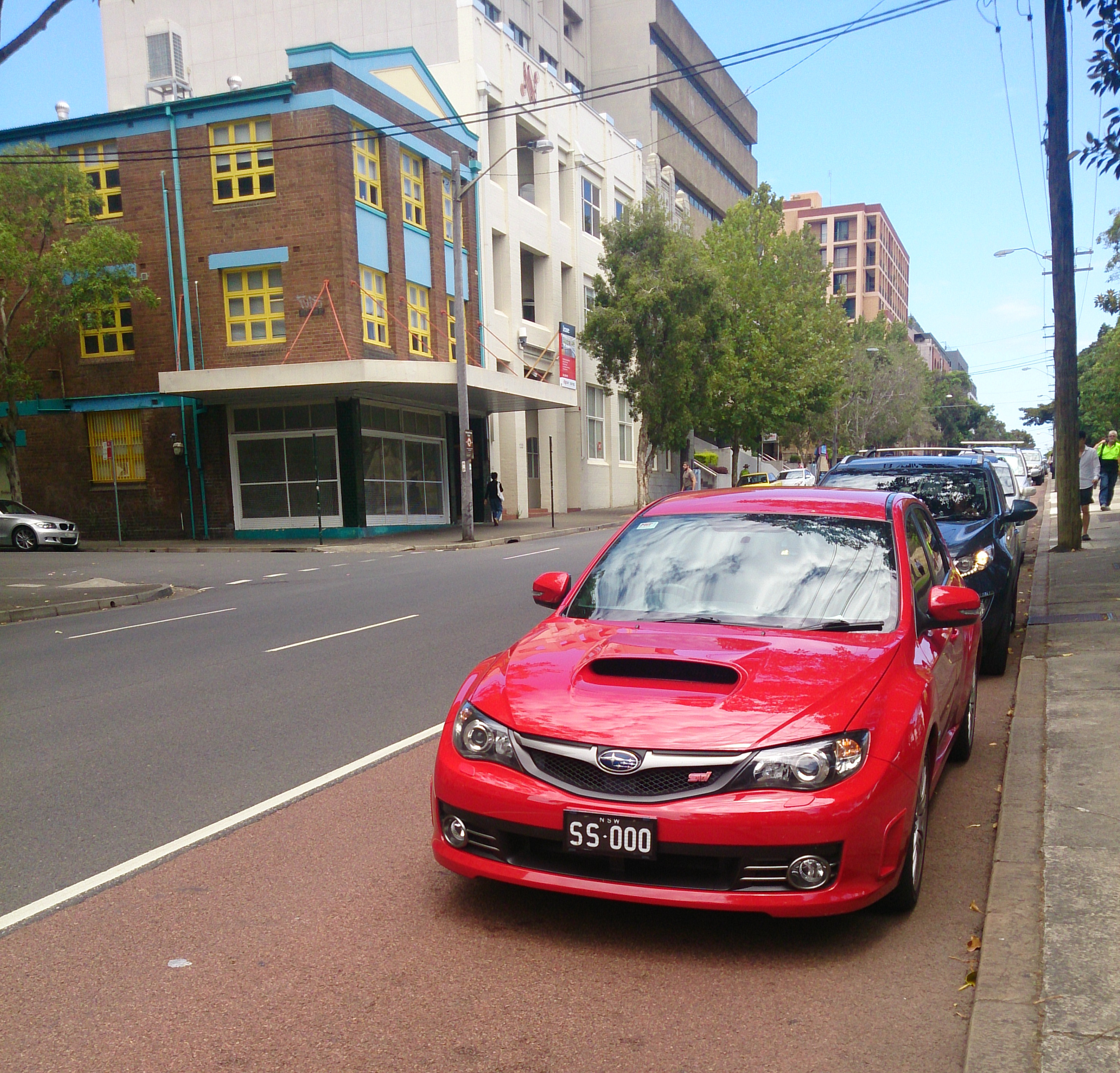
- Chalmers Street and Ruthland Street

General information
- Type: Street
- Length: 1.0 km (0.6 mi)

Major junctions
- Southern end: Phillip Street, Surry Hills
- Redfern Street; Cleveland Street; Devonshire Street
- Northern end: Foveaux Street, Surry Hills

Chalmers Street is a one way street in Surry Hills, Sydney, Australia.

Until 1905 Chalmers Street was part of Castlereagh Street when the continuity was broken by the construction of Central station. It was named after the 1856 built Chalmers Church.

It runs south–north from Phillip Street to Foveaux Street feeding traffic into Elizabeth Street.

In 1949, the southern part of the street between Devonshire and Foveaux streets was closed to facilitate the construction of underground platforms at Central station as part of the Eastern Suburbs railway line with traffic diverted via Randle Street. The original route was eventually restored in 1978.

A 1981 traffic report stated that after the widening of Botany Road and construction of the Eastern Distributor, that there would be "sufficient north-south traffic capacity" for "Chalmers Street to be closed at Cleveland Street, reverting to a two-way local road".

With the construction of the CBD and South East Light Rail, vehicular traffic was again diverted via Randle Street in 2015, with Chalmers Street redeveloped as the Central Chalmers Street tram stop.

Notable features along its route include Redfern Oval, the Central Sydney Intensive English High School, Cleveland House, Railway Institute Building, Prince Alfred Park and Sydney Dental Hospital.
