= Prince Alfred Park =

Park in Surry Hills, Sydney, Australia

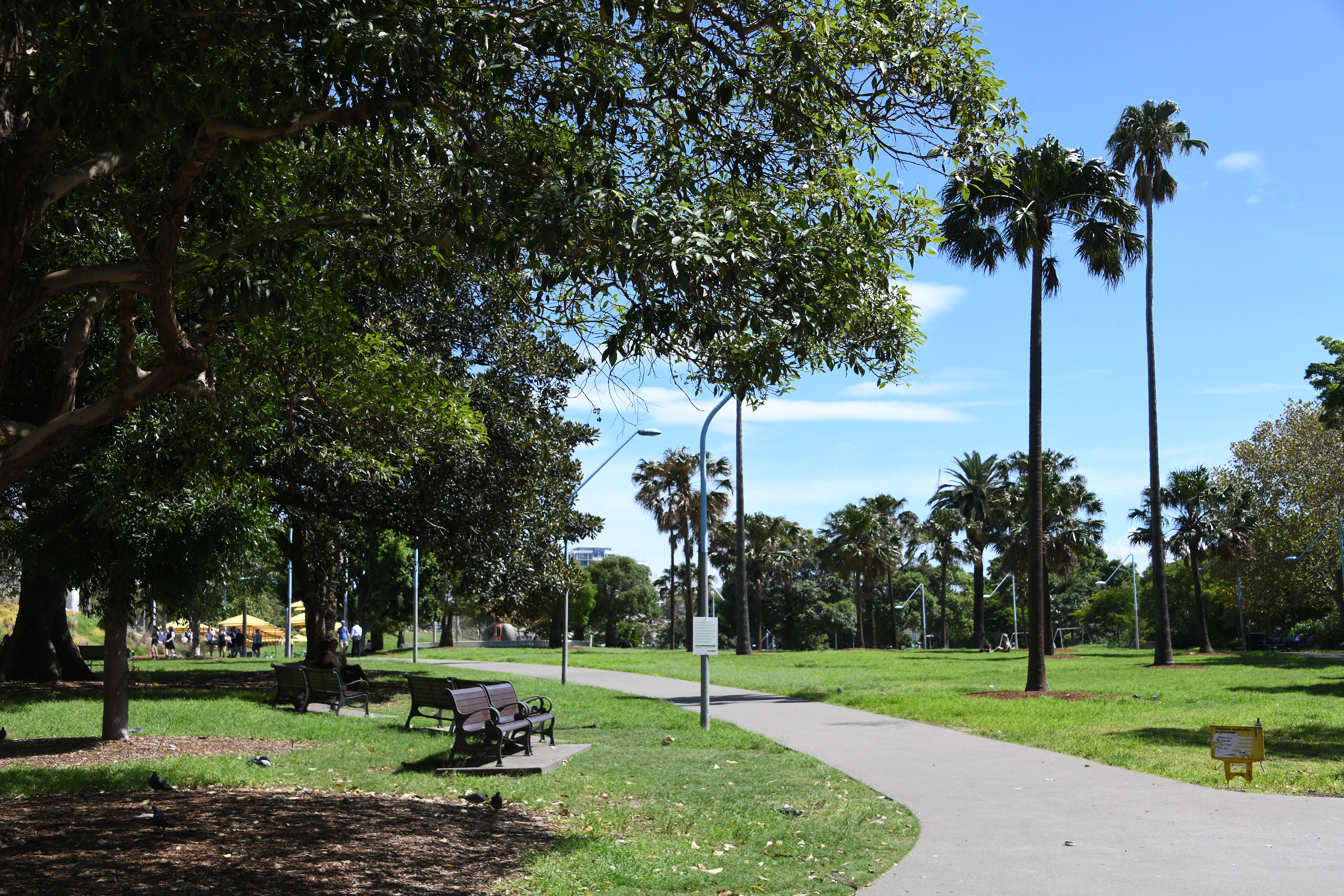
- Interactive map of Prince Alfred Park
- Type: Urban Park
- Location: Surry Hills
- Nearest city: Sydney
- Coordinates: 33.888°S 151.205°E
- Area: 7.5 hectares
- Created: December 1865
- Operator: City of Sydney
- Website: Prince Alfred Park

Prince Alfred Park is an urban park in Surry Hills, Sydney, Australia. It is bounded by Chalmers Street to the east, Cleveland Street to the south and the Main Suburban railway line to the west.

== History ==
In December 1865, part of Cleveland Paddocks was gazetted as a public reserve after a local landmark house built in the 1820s named Cleveland House. In 1868 it was named Prince Alfred Park after Prince Alfred when he visited Sydney.

The park layout was designed by Benjamin Backhouse. From 1869 until 1881, it hosted the Royal Easter Show. In 1870 the park hosted the Sydney Intercolonial Exhibition to mark the centenary of James Cook’s landing. After the exhibition, the Exhibition Building hosted important events and exhibitions. It housed the Australian War Memorial from 1925 until 1936 when it moved to Canberra.

Trees from the original 1870 plan of the park still exist, including Moreton Bay fig trees along the boundaries.

Tennis courts were opened in 1924 and a swimming pool in 1954. In 1926, the New South Wales Government Railways opened the Prince Alfred Sidings on the western border of the park. These were closed in June 1995. An ice skating rink existed behind the pool from 1959 until 1997.

In 1960 the Prince Alfred Park Swimming Pool opened. It was demolished in 2009 as part of a major upgrade of the park and the pool by the City of Sydney. It reopened in May 2013 after suffering delays related to extended periods of wet weather and the discovery of contaminated soil on site.

In June 1979 the Eastern Suburbs railway line opened beneath the park. In 2020 the Inner Sydney High School opened in the south-east corner.
