= Elizabeth Street, Sydney =

Street in Sydney, Australia

Elizabeth Street, Sydney New South Wales
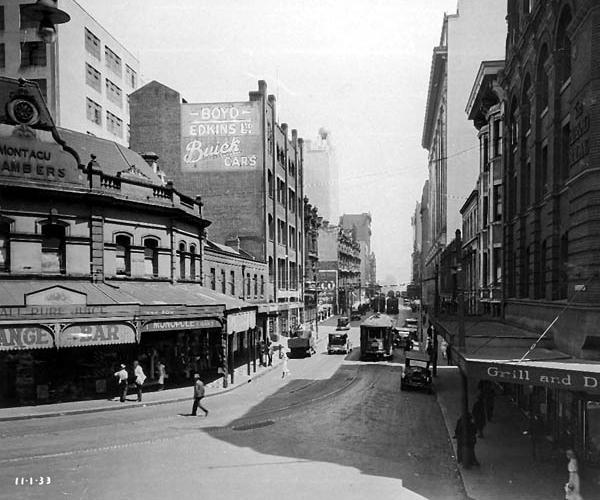
- Elizabeth Street, looking south from the intersection of Hunter Street in January 1933
- Sydney, New South Wales, Australia
- Coordinates: 33°51′59″S 151°12′39″E (North end); 33°54′26″S 151°12′28″E (South end)

General information
- Type: Street
- Length: 8.6 km (5.3 mi)
- Gazetted: 1810

Major junctions
- North end: Phillip Street; Sydney CBD
- Hunter Street; Martin Place; King Street; Market Street; Park Street; Bathurst Street; Liverpool Street; Goulburn Street; Hay Street; Albion Street; Eddy Avenue; Cleveland Street; Redfern Street; McEvoy Street; Bourke Street
- South end: Joynton Avenue; Zetland, Sydney

Location(s)
- LGA(s): City of Sydney
- Suburb(s): Sydney CBD, Surry Hills, Redfern, Waterloo, Zetland

Highway system
- Highways in Australia; National Highway • Freeways in Australia; Highways in New South Wales

Elizabeth Street is a major street in the central business district of Sydney in New South Wales, Australia. The street continues south of the central business district (CBD), through the inner city suburbs of Surry Hills, Redfern and Waterloo, before terminating in Zetland. Elizabeth Street lies within the City of Sydney local government area.

== Description and history ==
Elizabeth Street runs south from Hunter Street, past Hyde Park and David Jones, and reaches the CBD boundary at Central station. The street continues further south and is approximately 8.6 kilometres (5.3 mi) long and passes through a mixture of residential and commercial areas. Between Eddy Avenue and Redfern Street, the street carries southbound traffic only; with Chalmers Street carrying northbound traffic. The speed limit on Elizabeth Street varies between 40 kilometres per hour (25 mph) to 50 kilometres per hour (31 mph).

Elizabeth Street was originally known as Mulgrave Street, but was renamed by Governor Lachlan Macquarie in 1810 for his second wife, Elizabeth Henrietta Campbell (1778-1835).

On Victory over Japan Day (15 August 1945), the Dancing Man photograph and film were taken of celebrations in Elizabeth Street.

In 2016, it became the route for Sydney's Anzac Day parade when the traditional route via George Street became unavailable due to CBD and South East Light Rail construction work.

== Points of interest ==
=== Within the central business district ===
- Martin Place Special Area: this street is historically significant as a site of various monuments, including the Sydney Cenotaph. It was established as a meeting place in front of the GPO in 1863. Further development and evolution took place through the 1880s and 1930s, until the site was completely pedestrianised in 1970.
- St James station: started by the Chief Engineer of Metropolitan Railway Construction, St James was a vital link in the City Circle. It was built on two levels. Work commenced in 1916 but was held up by lack of funds. Work resumed in 1922. The station has a state heritage listing.
- Hyde Park: this is the oldest park in Australia, having been named by Governor Macquarie in 1810. The designer, Norman Weekes, won a 1926 design competition. The park includes the Oddfellows War Memorial (1921), the Archibald Fountain (1932) and Sandringham Gardens (1954), and has a state heritage listing.
- Museum station: this station was designed by John Bradfield as part of the City Circle rail system. It was built between 1922 and 1926 and has a state heritage listing.
- David Jones Market Street Store: designed by Mackellar and Partridge in 1938, plus Crawford H.Mackellar 1941, built 1938. The lower six floors were built between the wars, the upper floors were built after World War II. It represents one of the first examples of aluminium-framed windows in Sydney. The building has a state heritage listing.
- Former Registrar's Office: built late 1850, designed by Alexander Dawson, Colonial Architect, with a Tudor Gothic stone exterior, as part of the Supreme Court. Additions were by James Barnet in 1877 and 1886. The building is heritage-listed.
- Obelisk (facing Bathurst Street): this obelisk was based on Cleopatra's Needle in London, circa 1857. It is actually a sewerage vent in the Victorian Egyptian style. It is heritage-listed.
- Great Synagogue: located on the west side of Elizabeth Street, this synagogue was designed by Thomas Rowe, circa 1878. It seats 1,600 people on the ground floor and is heritage-listed.
- Downing Centre: formerly Mark Foy's department store, this building was designed by McCreedy and Anderson in 1908. The upper four storeys were added in 1928, having been designed by H.Ross and Rowe.
- Central station: designed by Walter Liberty Vernon, Central station has been described as the grandest railway station in Australia. It was built of sandstone from 1901-1906 and is one of the first examples of reinforced concrete in Australia. It is listed on the Register of the National Estate.
- Sydney Dental Hospital: the dental hospital was established in 1908 when the Dentists Act 1900 put dentistry on an organised footing. It is run by the Faculty of Dentistry at the University of Sydney.

=== South of the central business district ===
- Redfern Oval: this park is located between Elizabeth, Chalmers and Redfern Streets and includes an oval, sandstone perimeter walls, entrance gates, fountain and war memorials. Was the scene of the launch of the Australian Celebration of the 1992 International Year of the World's Indigenous Peoples. Has a state heritage listing.
- Waterloo Park: this park is located between Elizabeth, Kellick, Pitt and Allen Streets. The north-west corner contains the Mt Carmel Church, which was established in 1858.
- Mt Carmel Church and School: the school was first established in 1858 under the Benedictine Order. A new school was built in 1876. The church was begun in 1859 and was designed by William Monroe. The presbytery was opened in 1890. The complex has a state heritage listing.
- Waterloo Town Hall: this town hall is listed as a substantial representative of the Victorian Italianate style. It was designed by Edward Hughes and built 1880-81. It is historically significant as an example of the small, inner-city councils in Sydney and is heritage-listed.

== Transport ==
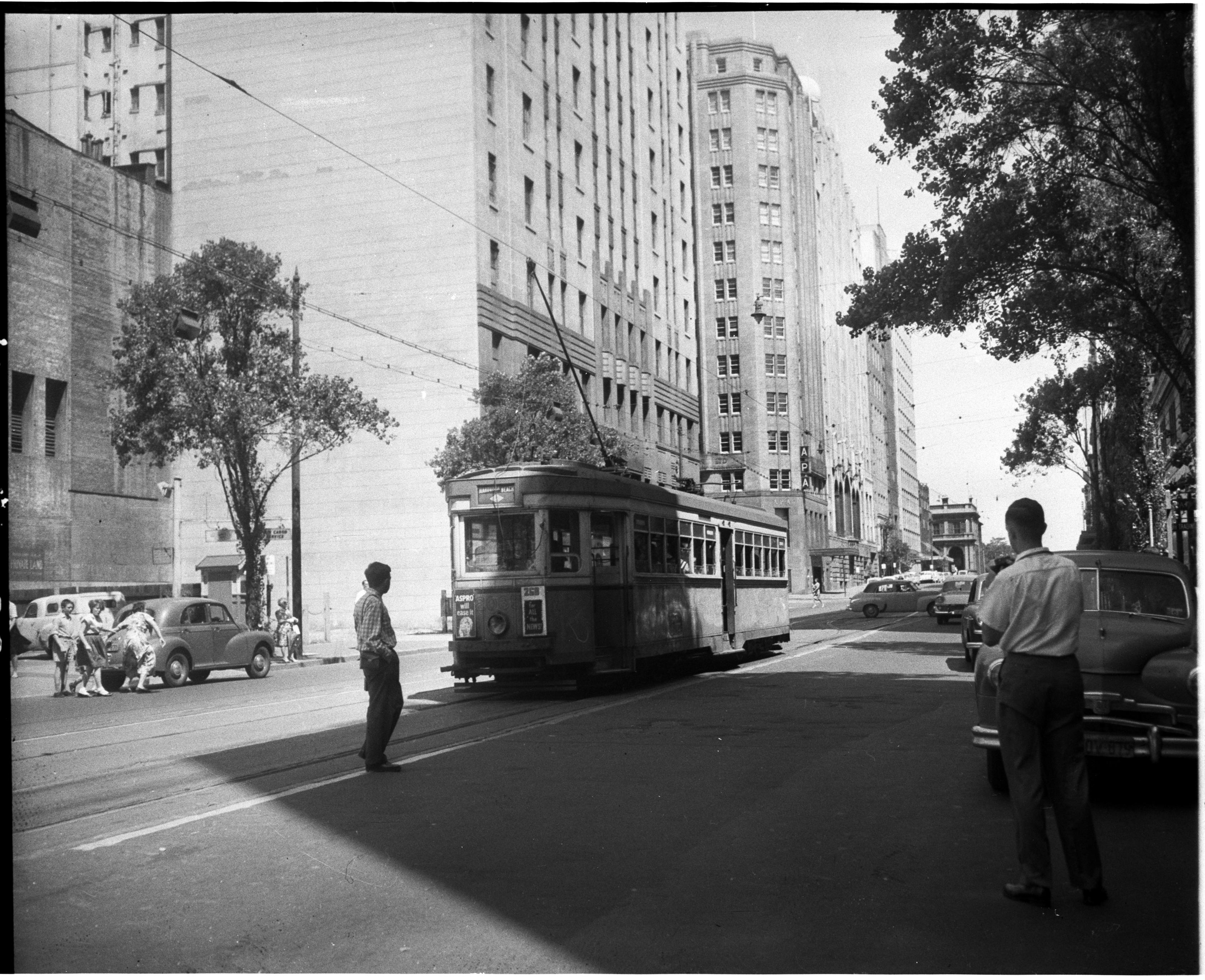
Last day of trams, covered in graffiti, Rural Bank tram stop, corner Martin Place and Elizabeth Street, 25 February 1961

Elizabeth Street was a busy electric tram corridor for most services to and from the eastern suburbs until the closure of the lines in 1961. The street is used by Transdev John Holland bus services to and from the Eastern Suburbs and Transit Systems services to and from the Inner West.

== Gallery ==
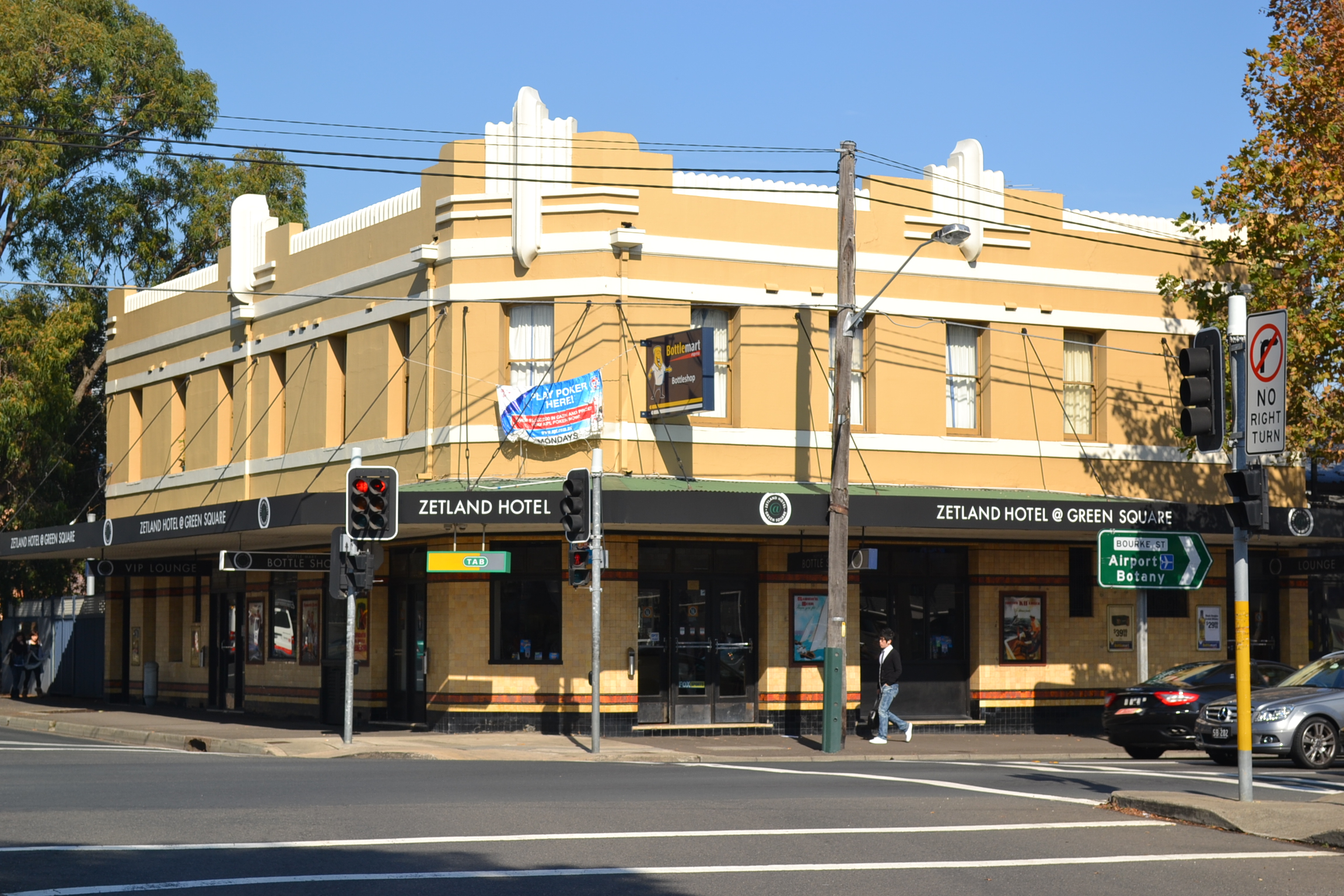
Zetland Hotel

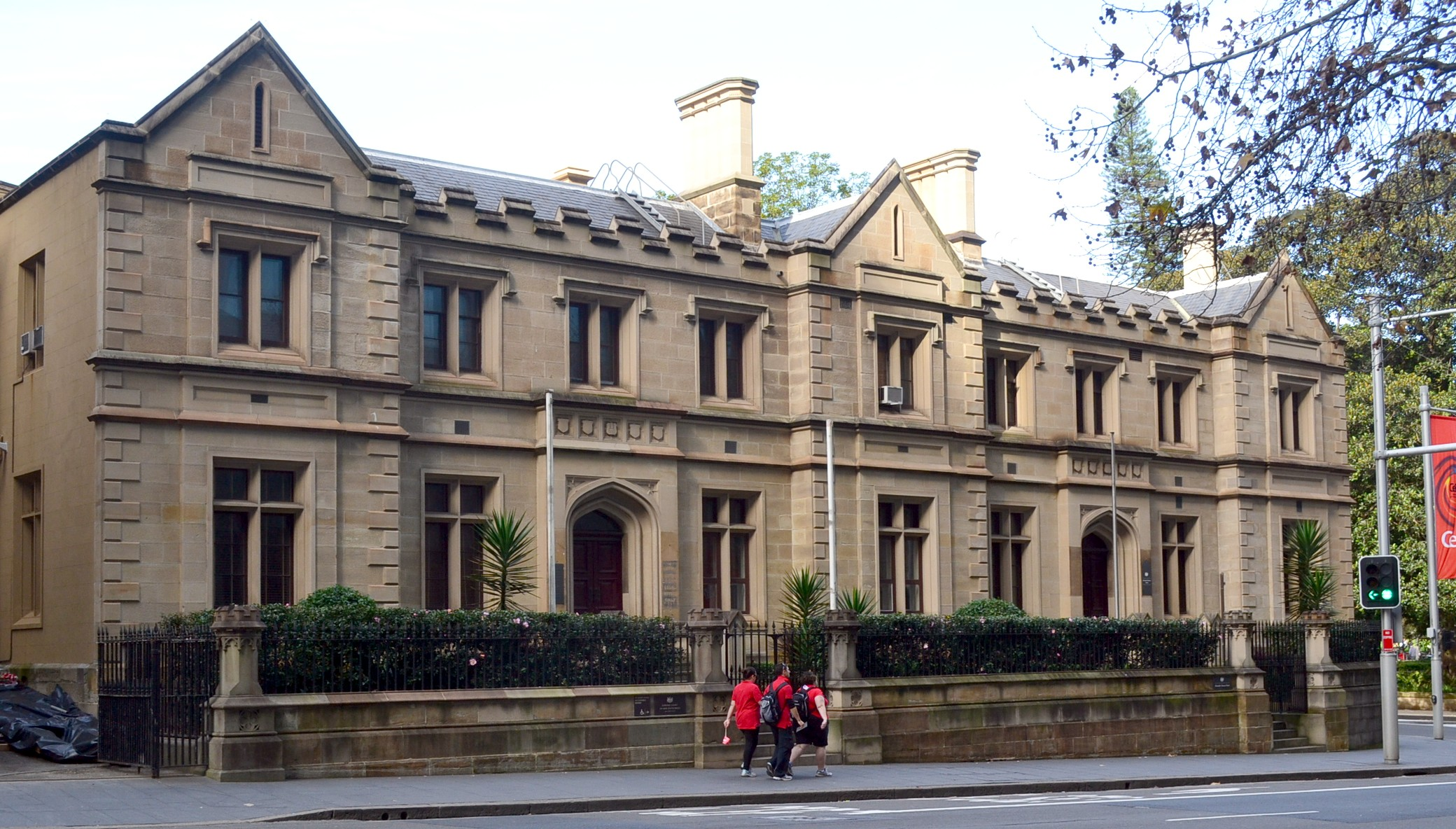
Old Registry Office

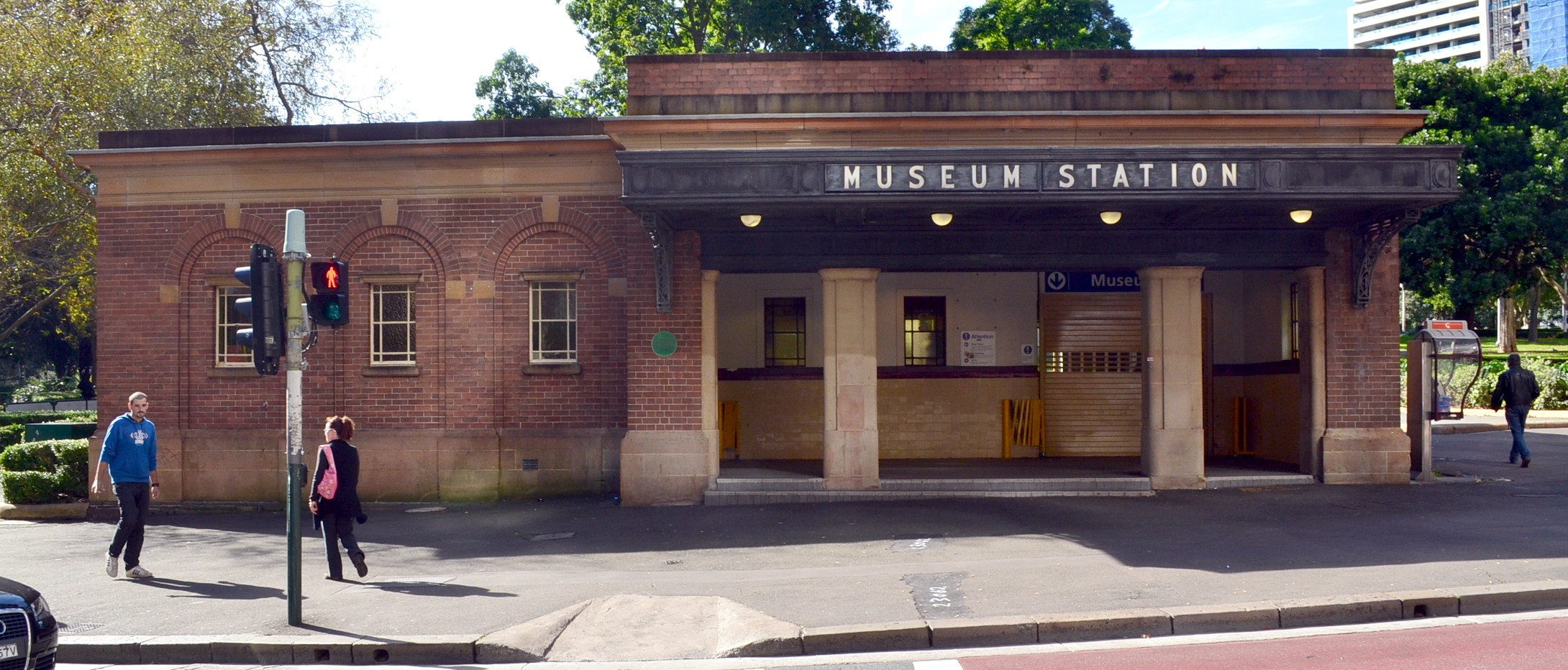
Museum station

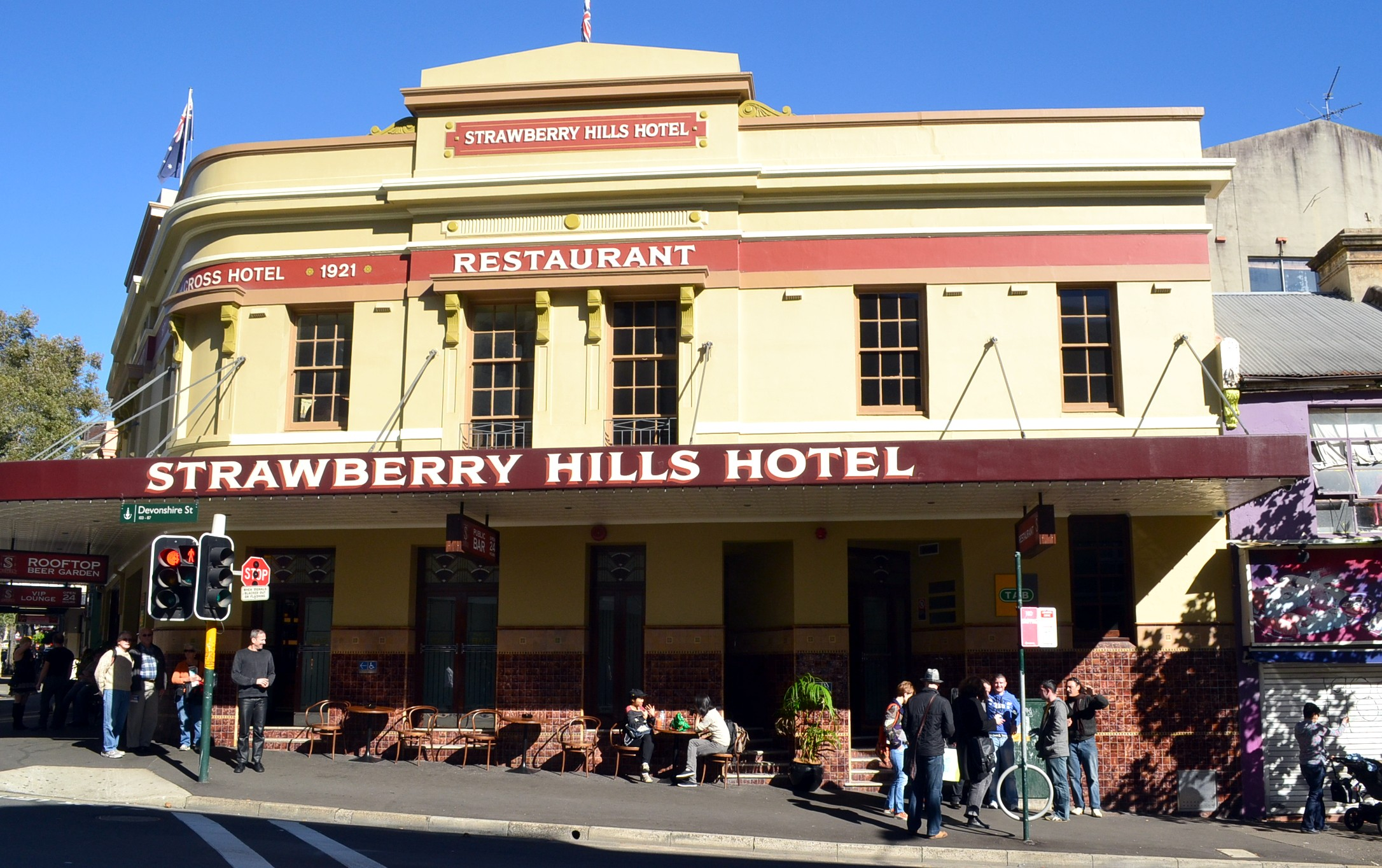
Strawberry Hills Hotel

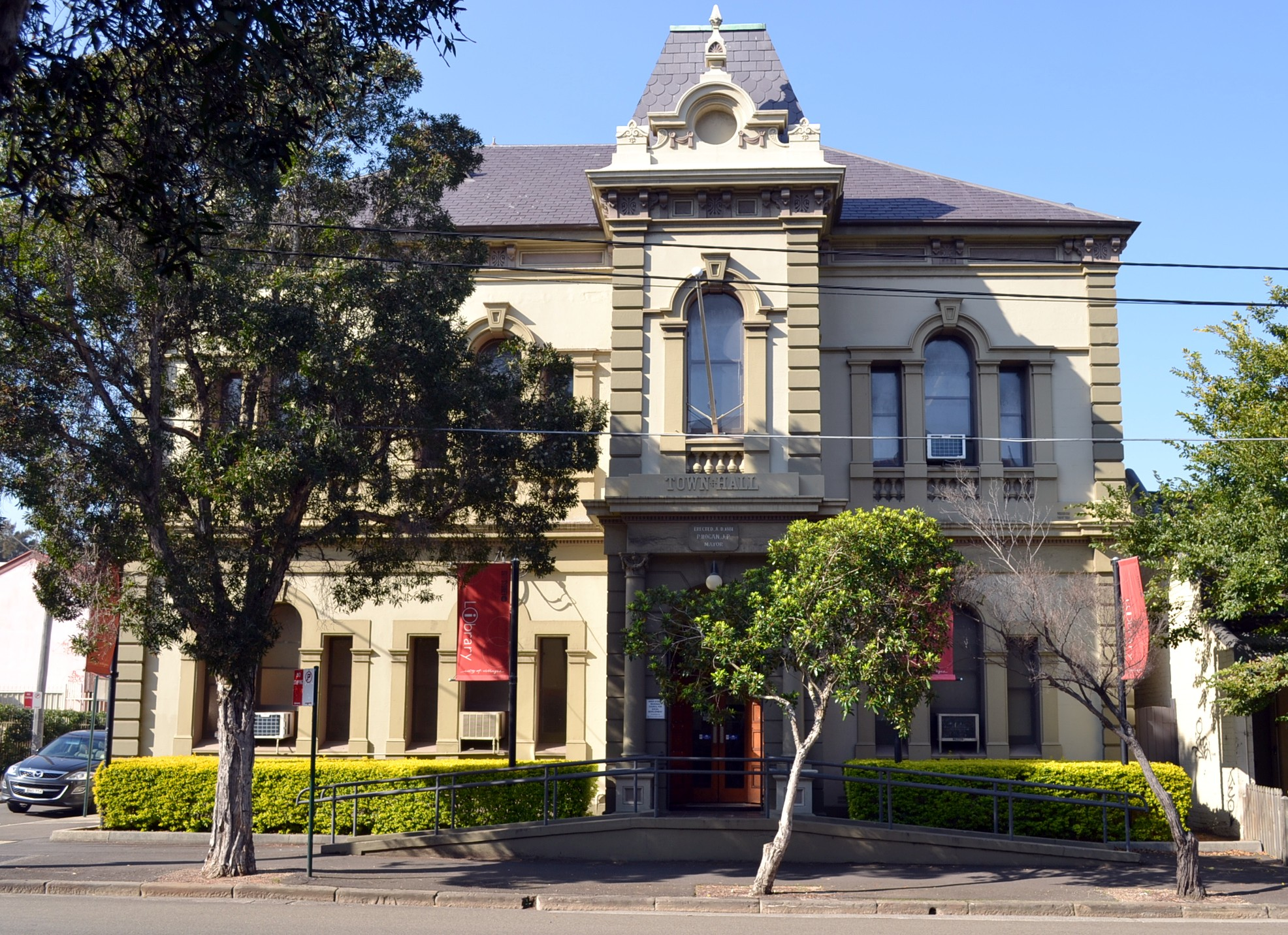
Former Waterloo Town Hall (1881)
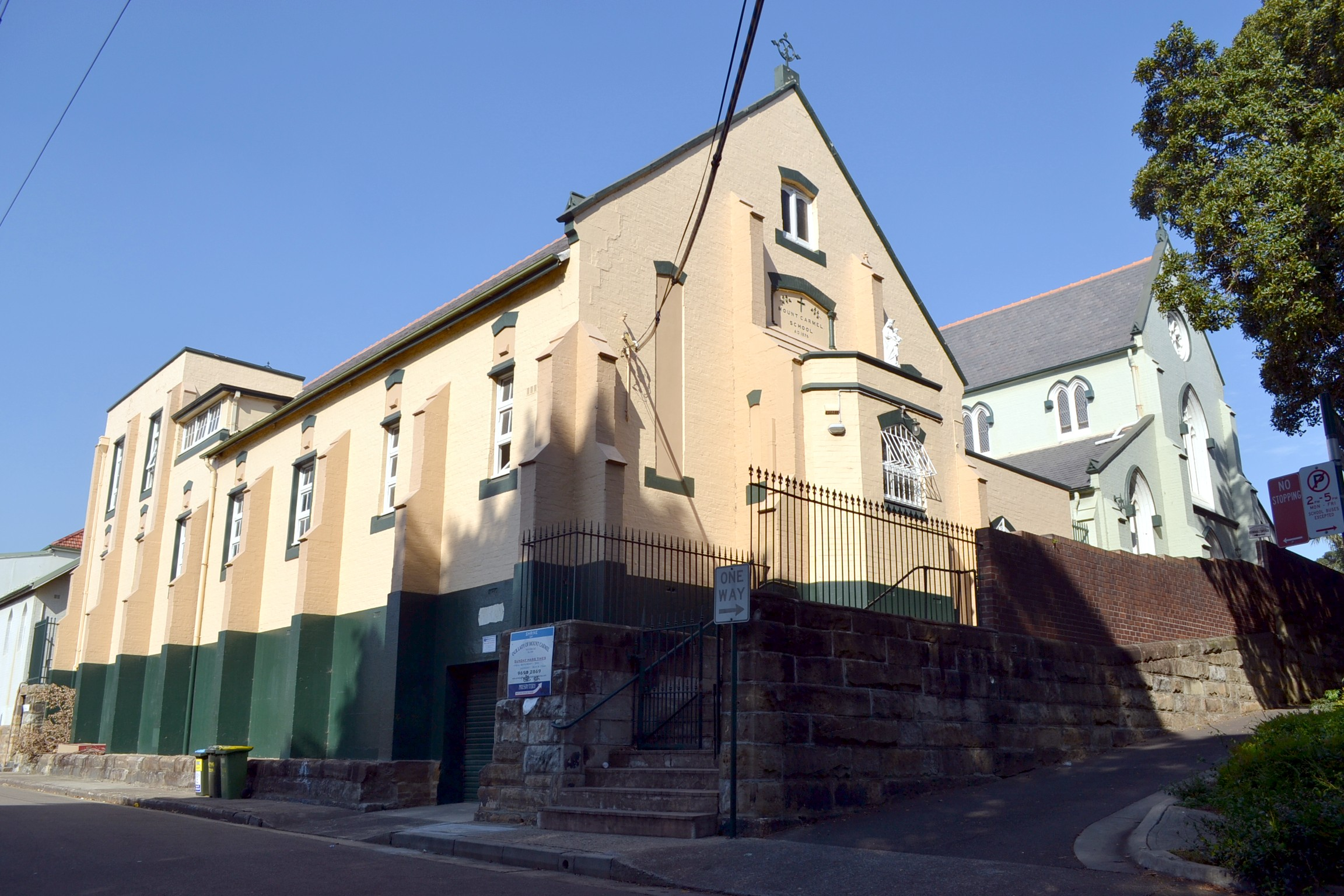
Mount Carmel Church and School

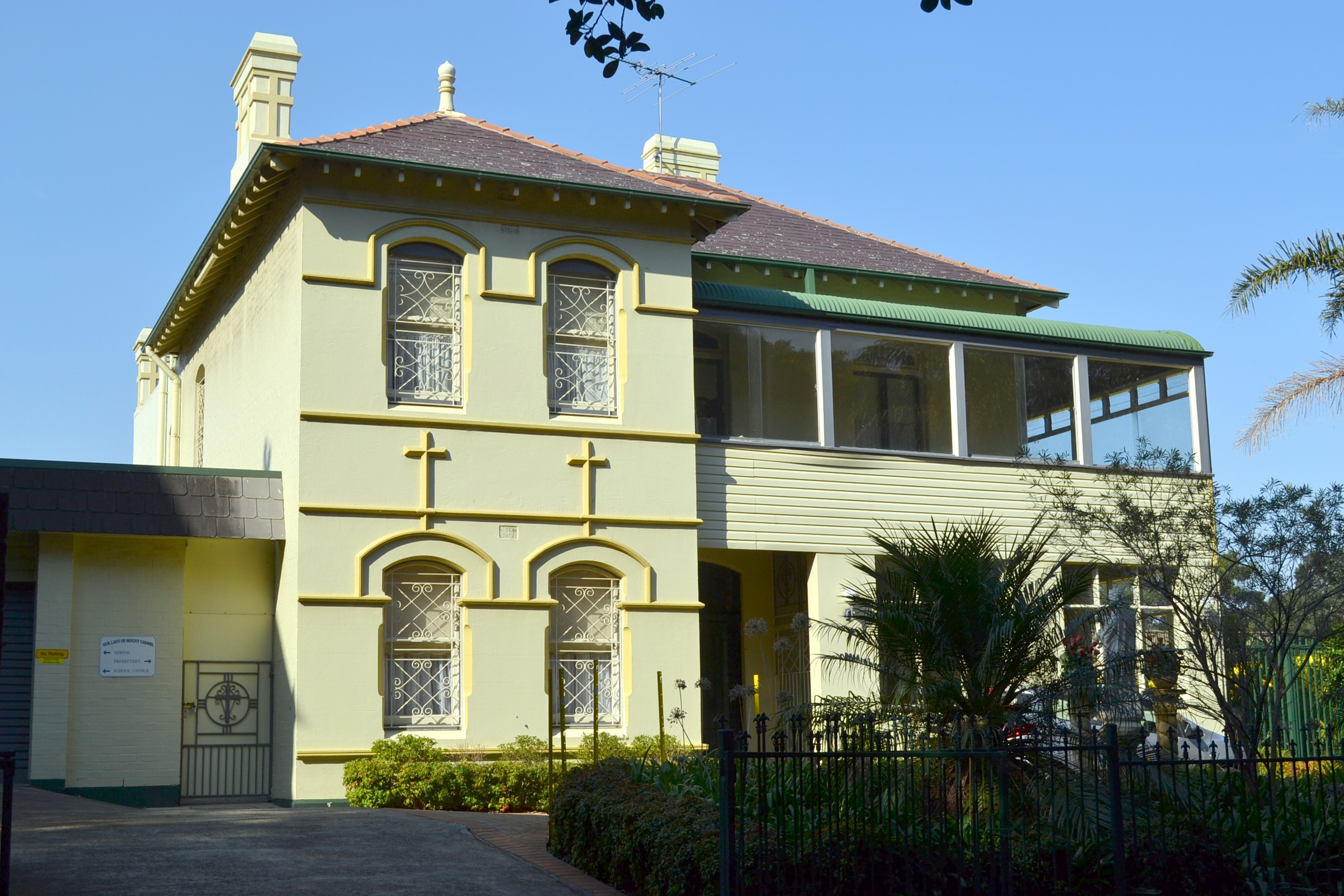
Mount Carmel Church Presbytery

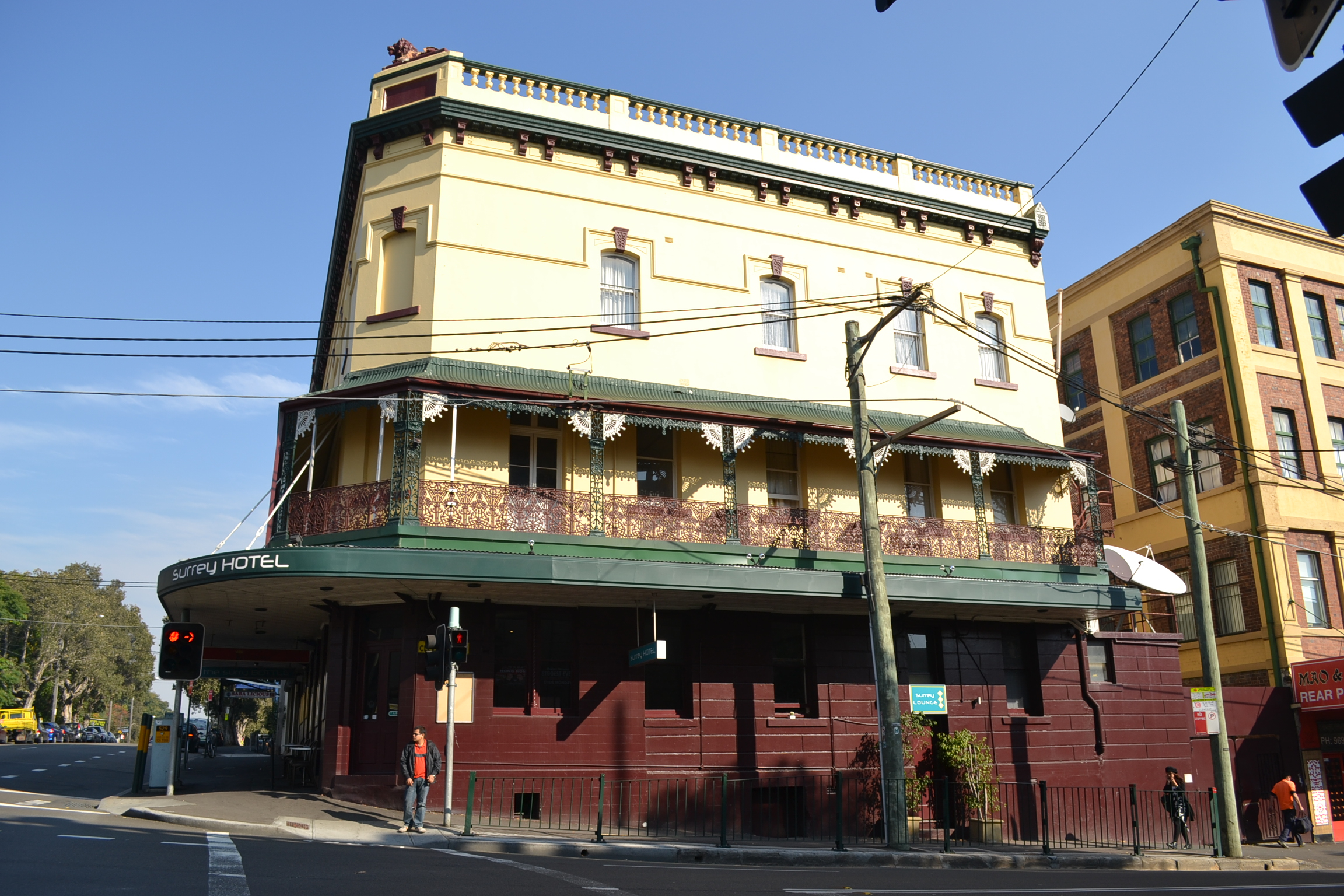
Surrey Hotel

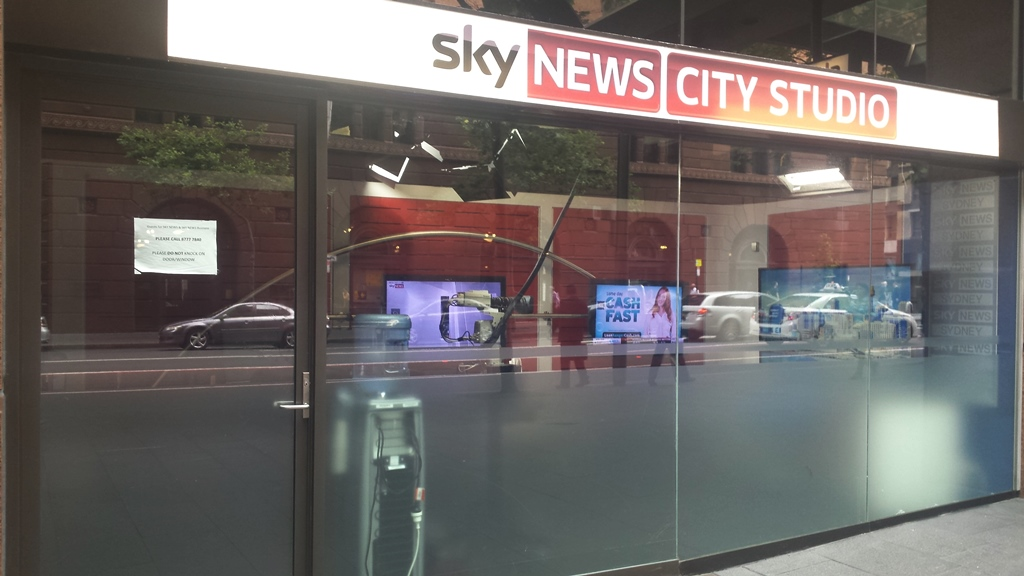
Sky News Australia CBD Studio
