= Cleveland House, Surry Hills =

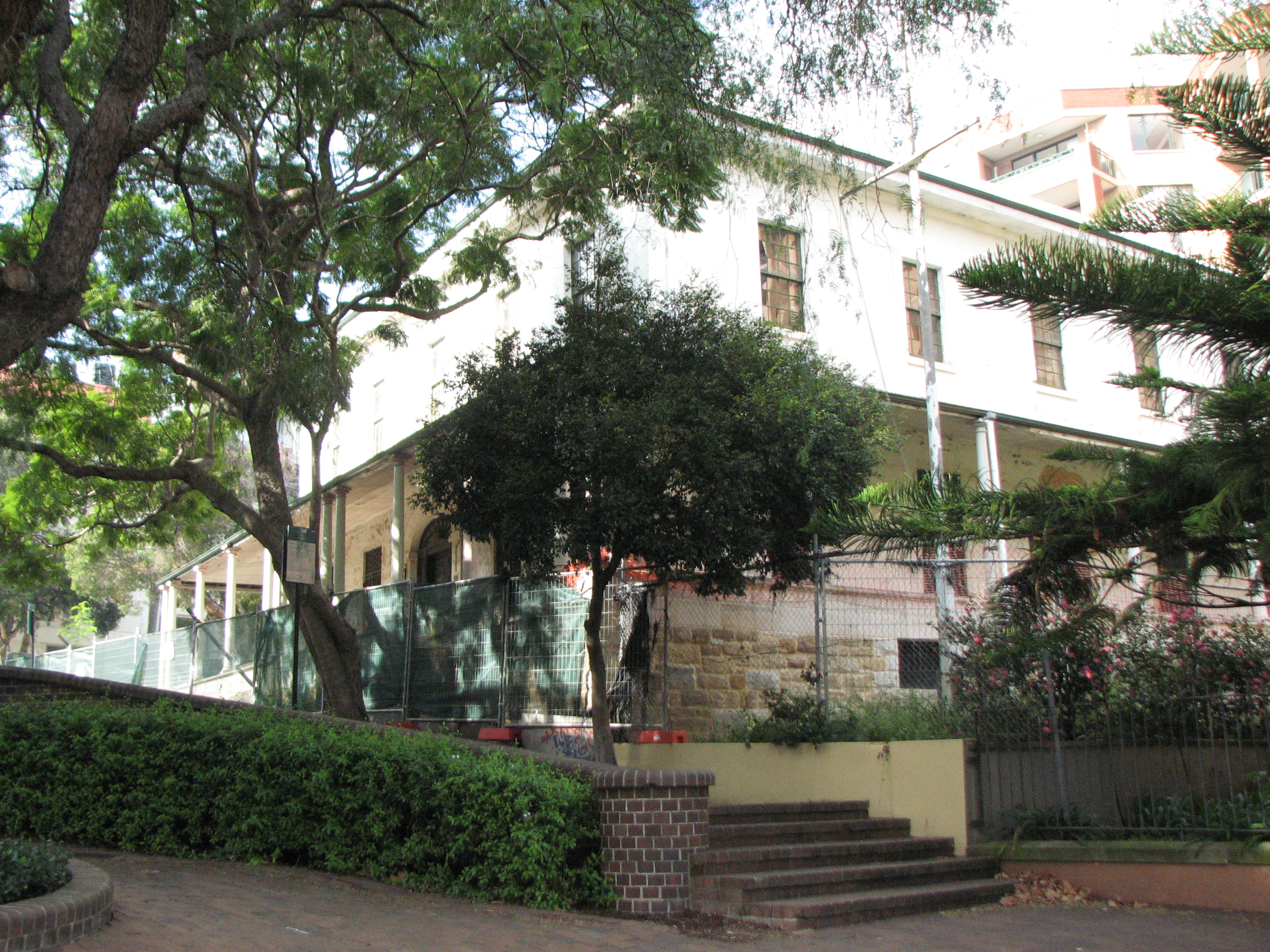
- Cleveland House, 146-164 Chalmers Street, Surry Hills, View from Bedford Street in April 2019.

- Location within Sydney Location within Australia
- 33°53′16″S 151°12′25″E
- Location: 146–164 Chalmers Street, Surry Hills, Sydney, Australia

History
- Built: 1823

Site notes
- Architect: Francis Greenway (attributed)
- Architectural style: Colonial Georgian

New South Wales Heritage Register
- Official name: Cleveland House; Cleaveland
- Type: State heritage (built)
- Designated: 2 April 1999
- Reference no.: 65
- Type: House
- Category: Residential buildings (private)

The Cleveland House is a heritage-listed former residence, hospital, convent and aged care facility and now vacant building located at 146–164 Chalmers Street, Surry Hills, Sydney, Australia. The building is located at the rear of the block and is best viewed from Bedford Street. Its design was attributed to Francis Greenway and built from 1823. It is also known as Cleaveland. The property is privately owned. It was added to the New South Wales State Heritage Register on 2 April 1999.

== History ==
Cleveland House was built in about 1823-4 for prominent emancipist merchant Daniel Cooper. The house was built on about five hectares (twelve acres) of land which was originally granted to Charles Smith by Governor Macquarie in 1809. Smith used this land, known as Cleveland Gardens, as either a market garden or nursery. Upon his purchase of the land Cooper spent A£4,000 on construction of the house, believed to be the work of architect Francis Greenway. The Cooper family moved into the house in 1825 but only resided there until 1829 when Cooper separated from his wife. At the time the house was let to provide Mrs Cooper with a source of income.

Until 1855 the house and its land was let out mainly to various families for residential purposes. However, in the 1830s the property was also used as a school. During this time the property is believed to have held prime views of the Darling Harbour and city areas. The decision in 1850 to build Redfern terminus brought industry to the area. This resulted in the subdivision of many of the gentlemen's estates in the neighbouring suburb of Surry Hills. This caused Surry Hills to be built out and changed its character from a picturesque "village" to a high density suburb.

Daniel Cooper returned to England in 1831 and left the house in the trust of James Cooper on the death of his ex-wife, Hannah, in 1836. Daniel Cooper died in 1853 and James Cooper sold the estate, which now amounted to around five hectares (thirteen acres), jointly to Moorehead and Walker. In 1855 this estate was subdivide into eight sections as part of the redevelopment of Surry Hills. The section containing the house and the outbuildings, lots 7, 8 and 12, were sold as a single property to Isaac Levey and inherited by his son, Montague, in 1860. For a short time after the subdivision the property was used for residential purposes but from 1858 the uses were varied. Uses included a school, laundry, boarding house, gentlemen's apartment and a government labour bureau.

A further subdivision of land, lots 7 and 8, occurred in 1886. However, only two of these were purchased. From about the mid-1870s the outbuildings were used as a cordial factory, Barrett's. It is thought that some new buildings and extension of existing buildings took place to accommodate the factory. This use continued until it was sold to Peach and Jones bottle merchants in 1896. At this time, the house was still owned by Levey.

In 1903, the Order of the Sisters of the Good Samaritan purchased the entire unit of the original 1855 subdivision, with the exception of the two lots that were purchased in the 1886 subdivision. The Order used the property as a receiving place in the city for its refuge. Cleveland House was used as a convent for the nuns. They built a large four-storey building to house the refuge and a commercial laundry which was opened in 1904. In the late 1920s the refuge became a home for aged and infirm women.

In 1946 the property was sold to the Franciscan Missionaries of Mary who used it for the same purposes as the Good Samaritans.

In 1958 Cleveland House was purchased by the NSW Society for Crippled Children. The refuge, built in 1904, was used as a hospital, clinic and for administration. Cleveland House was also used for administration. The former convent garden was filled in to be used as a lawn area and later for parking. Additional small buildings were constructed on the site.

The property was sold in 1988 to Denerin Pty Ltd and all the buildings with the exception of Cleveland House were demolished and further subdivisions have occurred. Today there is a small garden at the front of the house and a grassed area between the side of the house and Chalmers Street. A large apartment complex is located at the rear (south) of the house.

The house has been in private hands throughout its 186-year history. It is today owned by LGS Enterprise, which runs a medical education business InViVo Communications from the building.

== Description ==
Cleveland House is a two-storey stucco building, built in brick on stone foundations, in the Colonial Georgian style. In 1840 and 1886 it was described as having a slated roof but in a report in 1902 it had a "very old iron roof".

The verandah, supported by stone pillars, encompasses all four sides of the building on the first floor. In 1886 it is described as containing ten large rooms, including six bedrooms. In the basement there were four large cellars. The house was serviced by two staircases, one of these being an external stone staircase. The rear of the house had inner and outer courtyards which were formed by the outbuildings. It appears that some part of the inner courtyard still exists today.

In 1902 the verandahs was described as being in very poor repair. Today the house does not appear to be used or is used for storage. The windows are boarded or boxed up and there is rust on the verandah areas. However, the gardens outside the house are well maintained.

The original outbuildings have been demolished and the house stands alone on the property. Its lack of setting and state of disrepair do not do justice to its history as a prominent house on a large city estate.

=== Condition ===
As at 10 February 2010 the exterior is in poor condition with peeling paint and once elegant columns crumbling and dilapidated. Many of the verandah railings have fallen and part of it still shows the scorch marks from an earlier fire. Grass is growing through the floor boards in one section.

=== Further information ===
There is an underground carpark in Part Lot 3 which is part of the adjoining Meriton Unit blocks.

== Heritage listing ==
As at 6 July 2007, Cleveland House is of State significance as a rare surviving gentlemen's residence of the 1820s, built for a prominent convict emancipist merchant Daniel Cooper. The house is believed to be the work of Francis Greenway and is an example of a good quality residence of the time.

Until 1991 the house had seen continuous habitation. Changes in its usage and modifications, such as subdivision as well as erection of new and extension of existing buildings, reflect the history of this inner city of Sydney suburb. Some of these changes include residential, industrial, community service and government department use.

Cleveland House was listed on the New South Wales State Heritage Register on 2 April 1999 having satisfied the following criteria.

The place is important in demonstrating the course, or pattern, of cultural or natural history in New South Wales.

Cleveland House is of State significance as the oldest surviving residence in Sydney. It was built for a prominent emancipist merchant and landowner Daniel Cooper. This is representative of the convict roots of Australia and demonstrates the opportunities available in the early settlement. The subdivisions of his estate are indicative of the increasing urbanisation of the inner city landscape. The changing uses of the estate demonstrate the evolution and growth of manufacturing in the city.

The place has a strong or special association with a person, or group of persons, of importance of cultural or natural history of New South Wales's history.

The House is of State significance for its direct connection to Francis Greenway, a pioneering architect and emancipist.

The estate has strong connections to Daniel Cooper, an early emancipist merchant and landowner.

The place is important in demonstrating aesthetic characteristics and/or a high degree of creative or technical achievement in New South Wales.

Cleveland House is of State significances as a fine example of a substantial colonial Georgian house. The house is simple and symmetrical in design and sought to incorporate elements of English architecture with practical consideration of the Australian climate. The verandah that surrounds the house indicates this.

The place has a strong or special association with a particular community or cultural group in New South Wales for social, cultural or spiritual reasons.

Cleveland House is socially significant for its ties to convict history as well as the changing social landscape and population of the Surry Hills area. The house has connections with industry, social welfare, education, government and patterns of residential habitation.

The place possesses uncommon, rare or endangered aspects of the cultural or natural history of New South Wales.

Cleveland House of State significance as the oldest surviving residential house in Sydney.

The place is important in demonstrating the principal characteristics of a class of cultural or natural places/environments in New South Wales.

Cleveland House is representative of an important colonial town house. The fact that the original owner was an ex-convict is representative of the social fluidity of the Australian class system as opposed to the English system.
