= Waterloo, New South Wales =

Suburb of Sydney, New South Wales, Australia

Waterloo
- Suburb
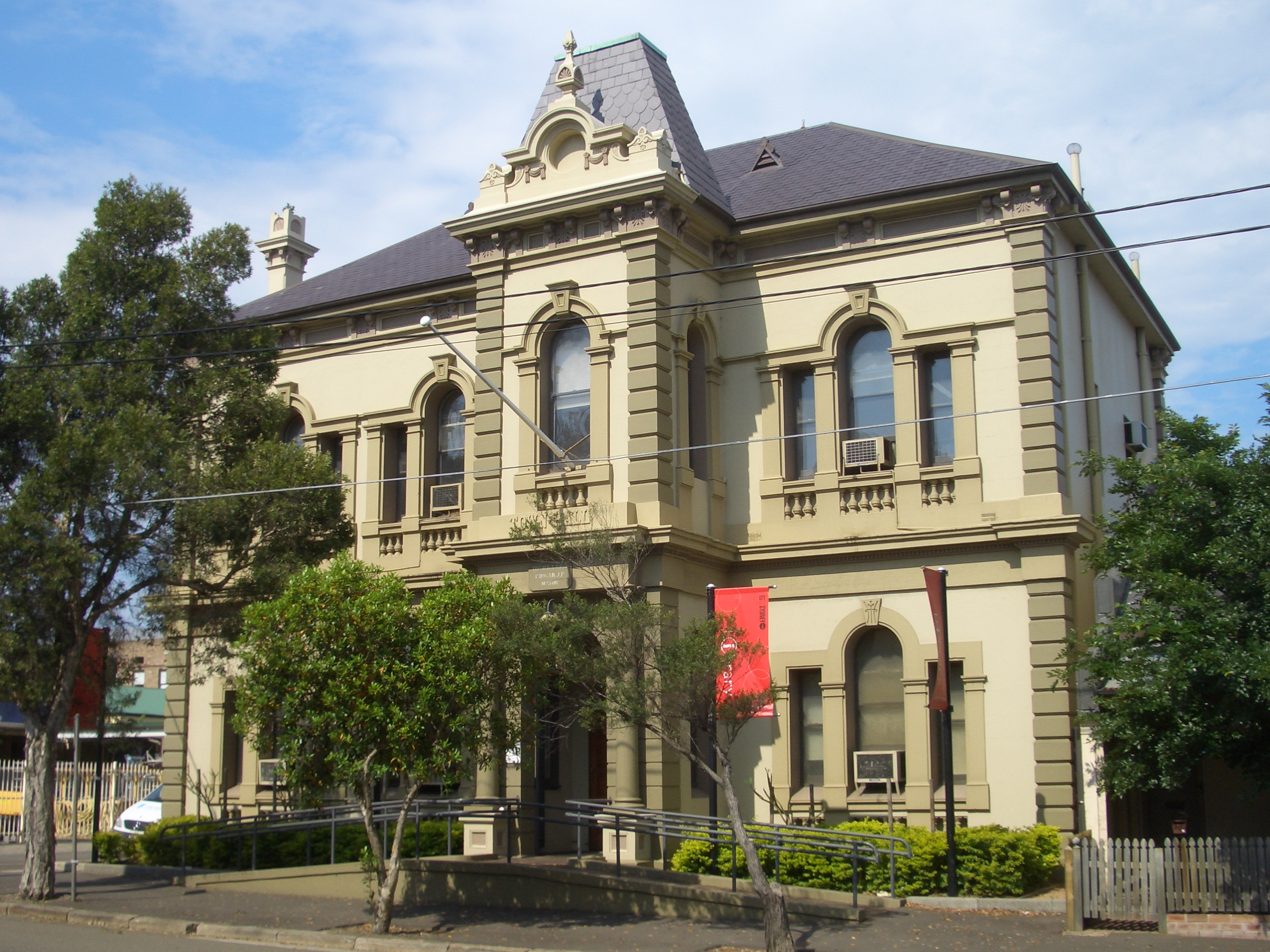
- Waterloo Town Hall

- Interactive map of Waterloo
- Coordinates: 33°54′01″S 151°12′28″E
- Country: Australia
- State: New South Wales
- City: Sydney
- LGA: City of Sydney
- Location: 3 km (1.9 mi) South of Sydney CBD
- Established: 1815

Government
  - State electorates: Heffron; Newtown
  - Federal division: Sydney

Area
  - Total: 1.13 km^{2} (0.44 sq mi)
- Elevation: 27 m (89 ft)

Population
  - Total: 16,379 (SAL 2021)
  - Density: 14,495/km^{2} (37,540/sq mi)
- Time zone: UTC+10 (AEST)
  - Summer (DST): UTC+11 (AEDT)
- Postcode: 2017
Suburbs around Waterloo
Darlington	Redfern	Moore Park
Eveleigh	Waterloo	Zetland
Alexandria	Rosebery	Kensington

Waterloo is an inner southern suburb of Sydney, New South Wales, Australia. Waterloo is located three kilometres (1.9 mi) south of the Sydney central business district and is part of the local government area of the City of Sydney. Waterloo is surrounded by the suburbs of Redfern and Darlington to the north, Eveleigh and Alexandria to the west, Rosebery to the south, and Moore Park, Zetland, and Kensington to the east.

== History ==
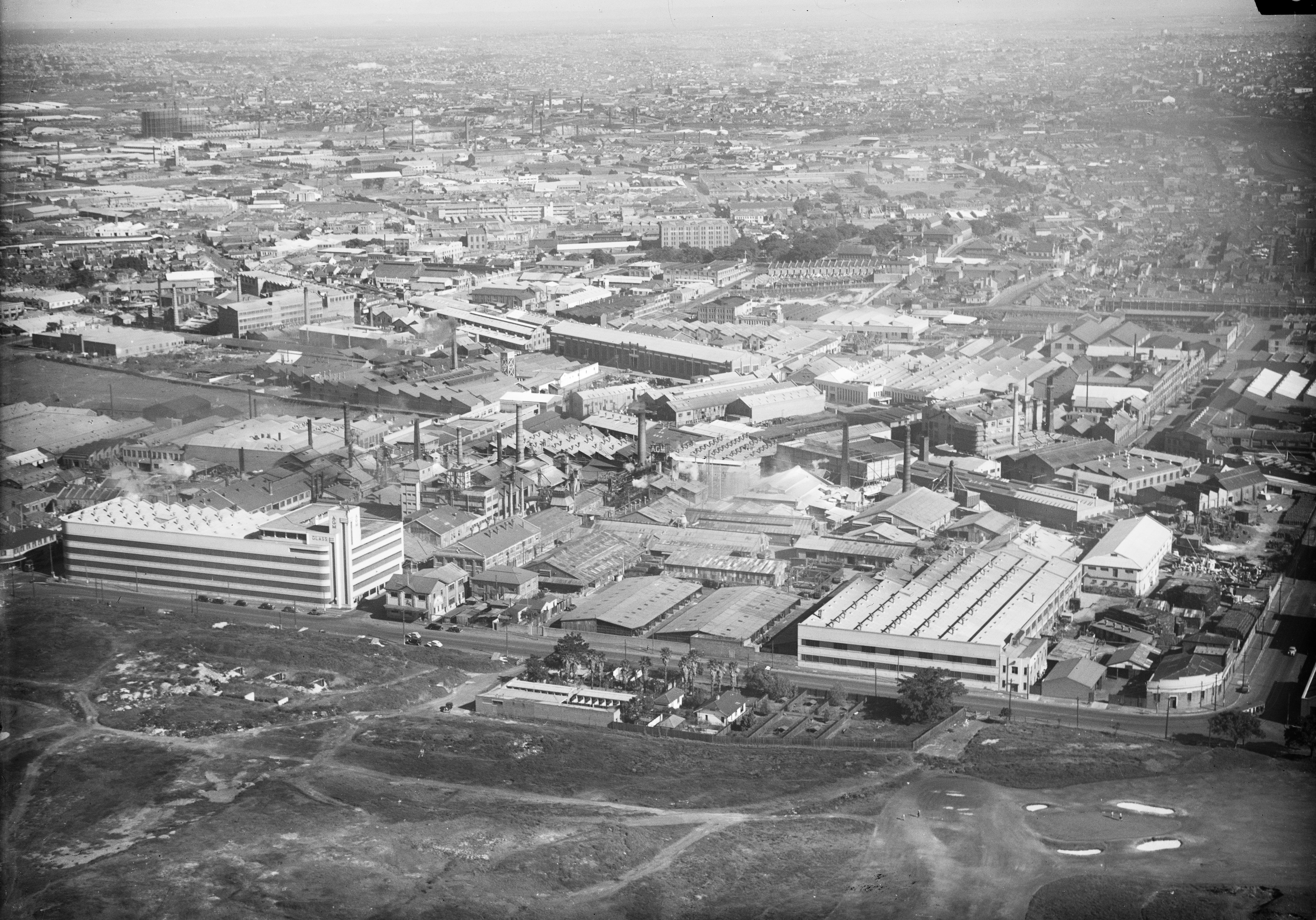
Waterloo and the Australian Glass Manufacturers works, from South Dowling Street, 1948-1952

Waterloo took its name from the Battle of Waterloo in 1815, when Allied and Prussian forces under the Duke of Wellington and Blücher defeated the French forces under Napoleon Bonaparte.

In the 1820s, Waterloo began supporting industrial operations including various mills such as the Fisher and Duncan Paper Mill and the Waterloo Flour Mill.

The Paper Mill was a partnership with three partners (Frederick George James Fisher, George Duncan and John Walker. Established in 1818 it is the first mill known to produce paper in Australia.

The Lachlan and Waterloo Flour Mills Waterloo Flour Mills was originally a partnership with Thomas White Melville Winder and Samuel Terry in 1820 with a flour mill established in what is now Kensington. Six partners made up the new partnership including William Hutchinson, Daniel Cooper, Thomas White Melville Winder, Samuel Terry, George Williams and William Leverton trading as Hutchinson, Terry & Co. William Hutchinson, superintendent of convicts and public works, had been granted 1,400 acres (5.7 km^{2}) of land in 1823 in the Waterloo area what had previously a water powered flour mill developed (c. 1818). The other partners sold out to existing partner Daniel Cooper in 1825 and new partner Solomon Levey. These two became the sole owners of the Waterloo Co., which was generally known as Cooper & Levey. Cooper later bought out Levey's share and on his death the Waterloo Estate passed onto his nephew, also named Daniel Cooper, who was the first speaker of the New South Wales Legislative Assembly. This part of Waterloo was part of Daniel Cooper's landholding before being subdivided in the 1880s.

From at least the 1960s there were plans for slum clearance in Waterloo. In the 1970s there were protests to prevent 'slum clearance' and the construction of new towers. John Bourke unveiled plans in 1973. In 1974, the Builders Labourers Federation placed a green ban against the construction of demolition of low-income housing to make way for new apartments.

A 1981 report stated that McEvoy Street in Waterloo is a major barrier to residential access to Waterloo Oval (which the Housing Commission saw as part of the open space and facilities associated with the Endeavour Estate). The view of the report suggested a route following O'Dea Avenue and Allen Street to link with McEvoy Street/Euston Road as preferred to upgrading McEvoy Street to an arterial road.

Alexandria, Waterloo and Zetland had an interdependence in terms of shopping facilities and pedestrian movement by 1981. There was concern this would be "significantly affected" if Raglan Street were to be closed and the Copeland Street, Erskineville extension to implemented.

Waterloo is the subject and title of a 1981 film by Tom Zubrycki. The film is about local residents opposing slum clearance and redevelopment. Four months after the film screened, the residents succeeded in their demands. It was created with the assistance of the Creative Development Branch of the Australian Film Commission, and was awarded first prize for Documentary in the Greater Union Awards, Sydney Film Festival 1981. Leonie Sandercock said it was the best documentary she'd seen on the struggle between "planners, profiteers, and people in an Australian city".

== Location ==
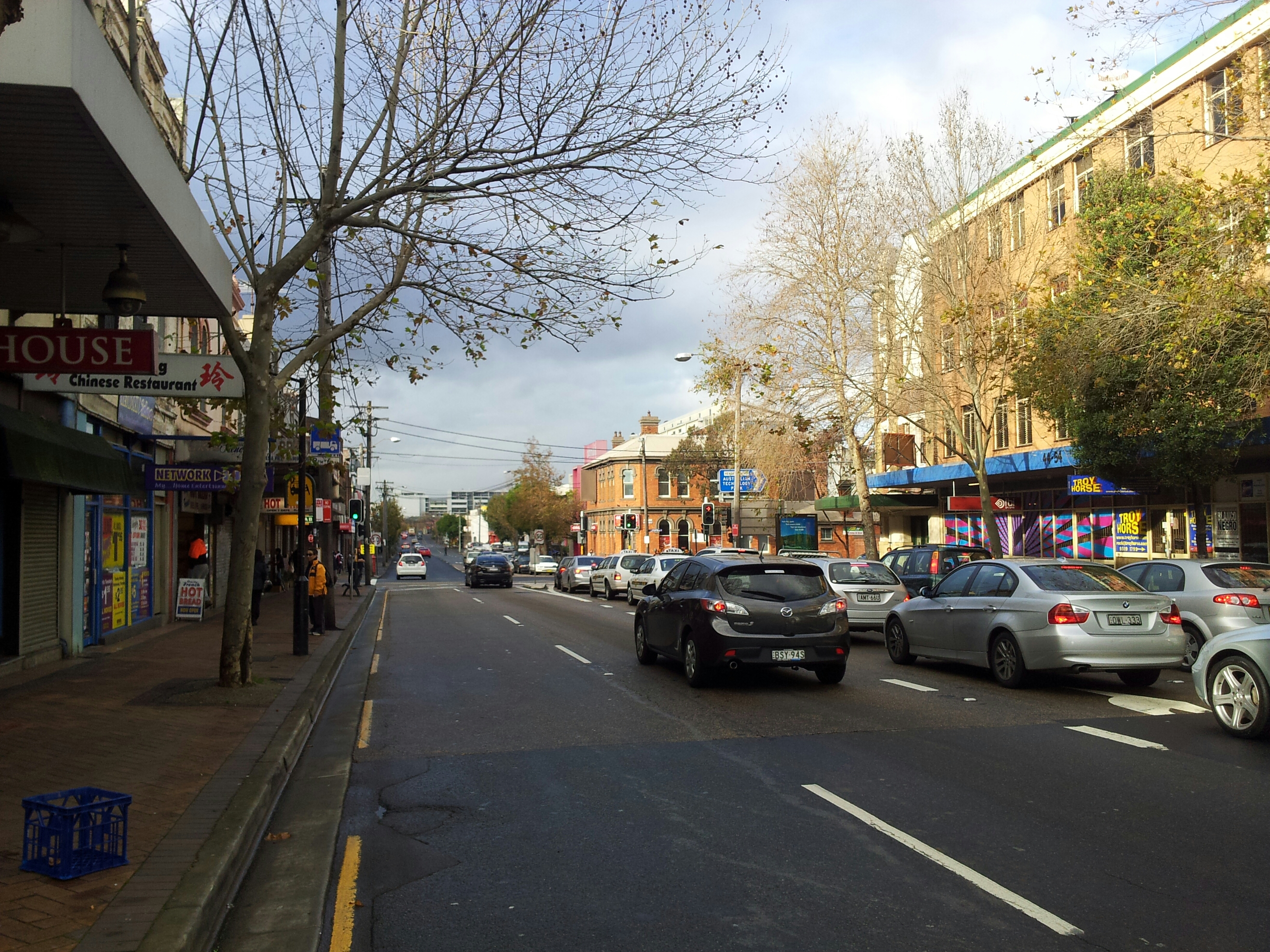
Botany Road

Waterloo is historically a working-class region. Since early 2000s, the region has undergone some degree of gentrification with a rising business district focusing on technology-oriented firms and the development of more green space such as parks. By 2006, median individual income in Waterloo was slightly higher than the Australian average.

Nevertheless, the suburb maintains a large housing commission estate shared with Redfern with around 4,000 tenants. The Waterloo estate is set for a facelift, with the older flats/tower blocks getting redeveloped into large luxury apartment blocks mixing social housing with affordable housing alongside the new Metro station being developed nearby.

New development and redevelopment in this area is encouraged to be sympathetic to the existing heritage style.

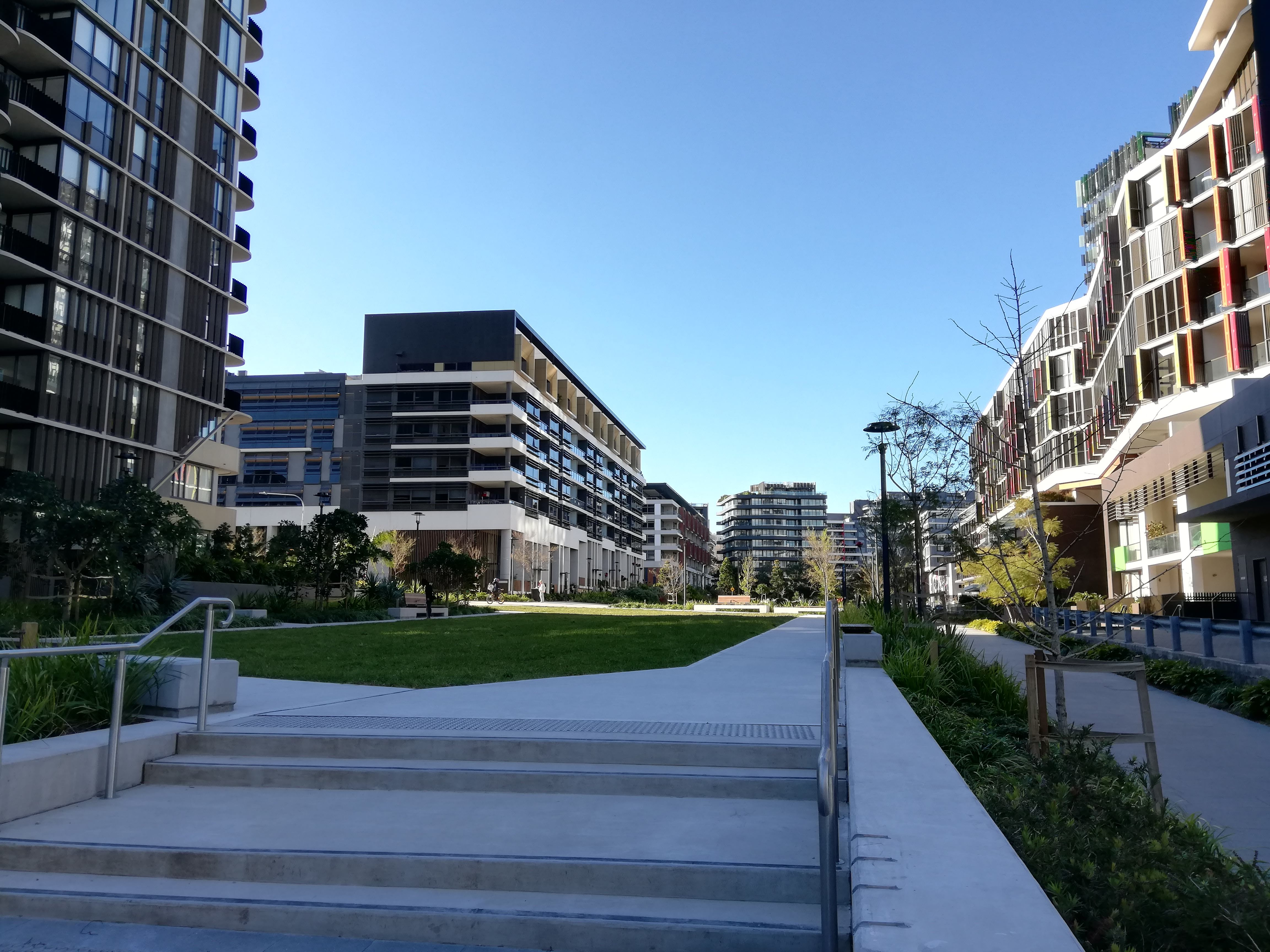
Modern apartment developments

Green Square is a district in the south and east of the suburb including the suburbs of Waterloo and Zetland that is being redeveloped. It involves an urban renewal program which has seen many industrial buildings redeveloped or replaced by new residential and commercial developments. The area adjacent to South Dowling Street contains many high-rise apartment buildings with retail space at ground level.

In January 2019, the Government of New South Wales released a redevelopment masterplan of the Waterloo social housing estate. The government's plan outlines a 20-year vision for the area, which is about 4 kilometres from the Sydney CBD. It will include building 6,800 new homes and will comprise 6 high-rise buildings of 33 to 40 storeys.

== Transport ==
=== Buses ===
Waterloo is serviced by Transdev John Holland routes to the Sydney CBD. Green Square railway station, on the T8 Airport & South line of the Sydney Trains network, is located in the south-west corner of the suburb. Redfern railway station is located close to the north-west corner of the suburb.

=== Trains ===
The Chatswood to Bankstown Metro North West & Bankstown Line line includes Waterloo station which opened in August 2024.

=== Cars ===
Transport for NSW has proposed the Alexandria to Moore Park Project (A2MP) project to widen McEvoy Street from Sydney Park to Moore Park through Alexandria, New South Wales and Waterloo. The project was "in progress" as of June 2026.

The NSW Department of Planning, Housing and Infrastructure Infrastructure Opportunities Plan, published February 26, 2026, stated "intersection upgrades at McEvoy Street and Botany Road" were "Funded for delivery" by Transport for NSW, with completion expected in 2026. As of June 2026, planning and design were underway.

== Churches ==
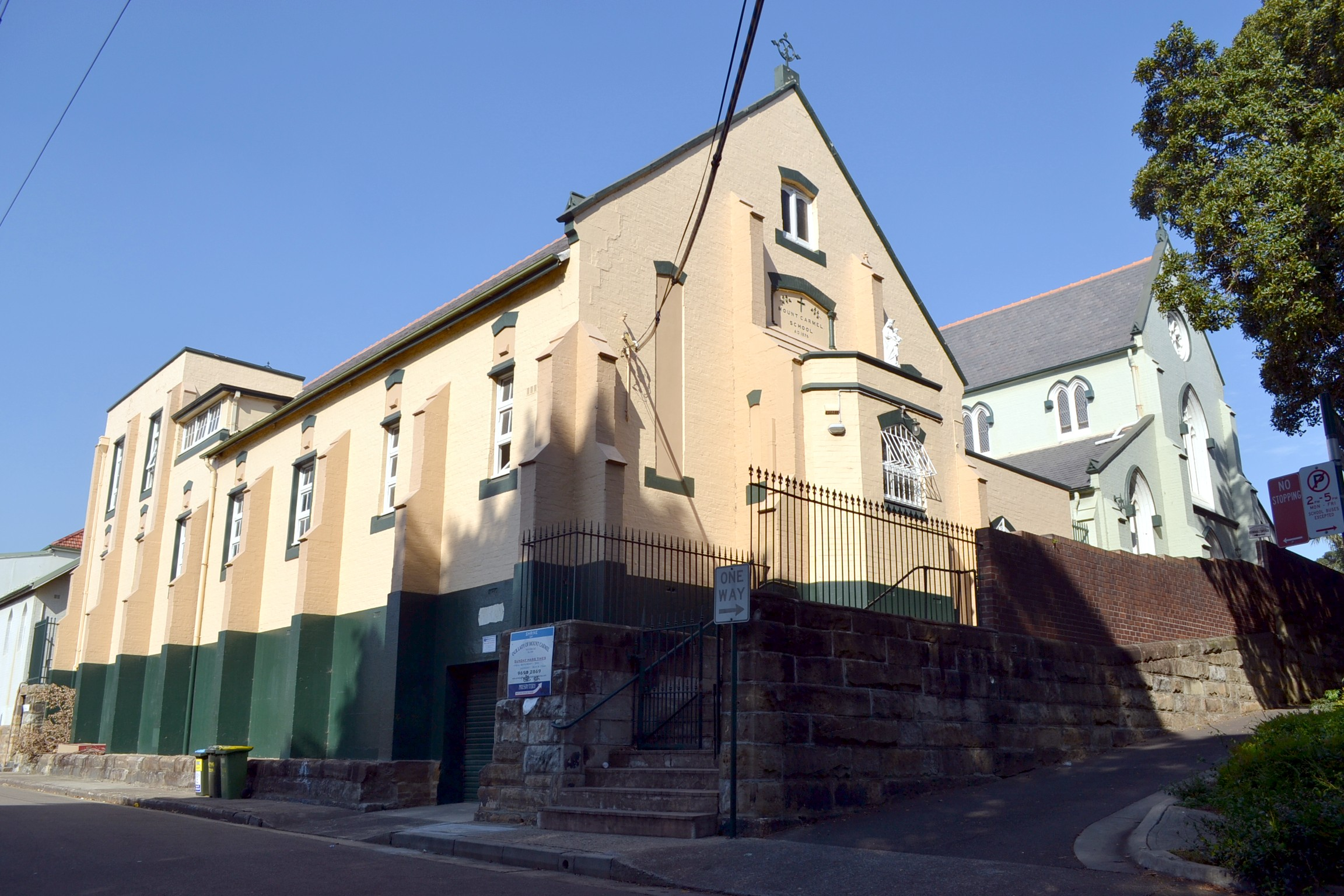
Parish and Shrine of Our Lady of Mount Carmel

Waterloo hosts the city campus of Hillsong Church (affiliated with the Assemblies of God). Other churches include Grace City Anglican Church, Shrine and Parish of Our Lady of Mount Carmel Catholic Church, Waterloo Congregational Church, South Sydney Uniting Church (earlier known as Mount Lachlan Methodist Church), and Waterloo Salvation Army.

== Demographics ==
At the 2021 census, Waterloo had a population of 16,379, compared to 14,616 at the 2016 census.

In 2021, Aboriginal and Torres Strait Islander people made up 2.8% of the population and 37.2% of people were born in Australia. The other most common countries of birth were China 11.5%, England 5.6%, New Zealand 2.6%, Ireland 2.3% and Brazil 1.8%. 45.2% of people only spoke English at home. Other languages spoken at home included Mandarin 12.0% Cantonese 3.0%, Spanish 3.2%, Russian 2.7% and Portuguese 1.6%. The largest religions were Catholicism (16.5% of the population), Buddhism (4.4%) and Anglicanism (4.2%). Furthermore, 50.2% of the population marked no religion, well above the national average. 91.1% of residences were units, well above the rest of Australia (where only 14.2% of residences were units). Furthermore, 72.7% of dwellings were rented, compared to 30.6% in Australia as a whole.

== Recreation ==
The Waterloo Skate Park is a modern skate park and the first of its kind to copy the urban streetscape layout of popular skate spots like Martin Place and Cathedral Square in Sydney. The park is located next to Waterloo Oval and the Weave Youth Services (formerly South Sydney Youth Services) building on Elizabeth Street.

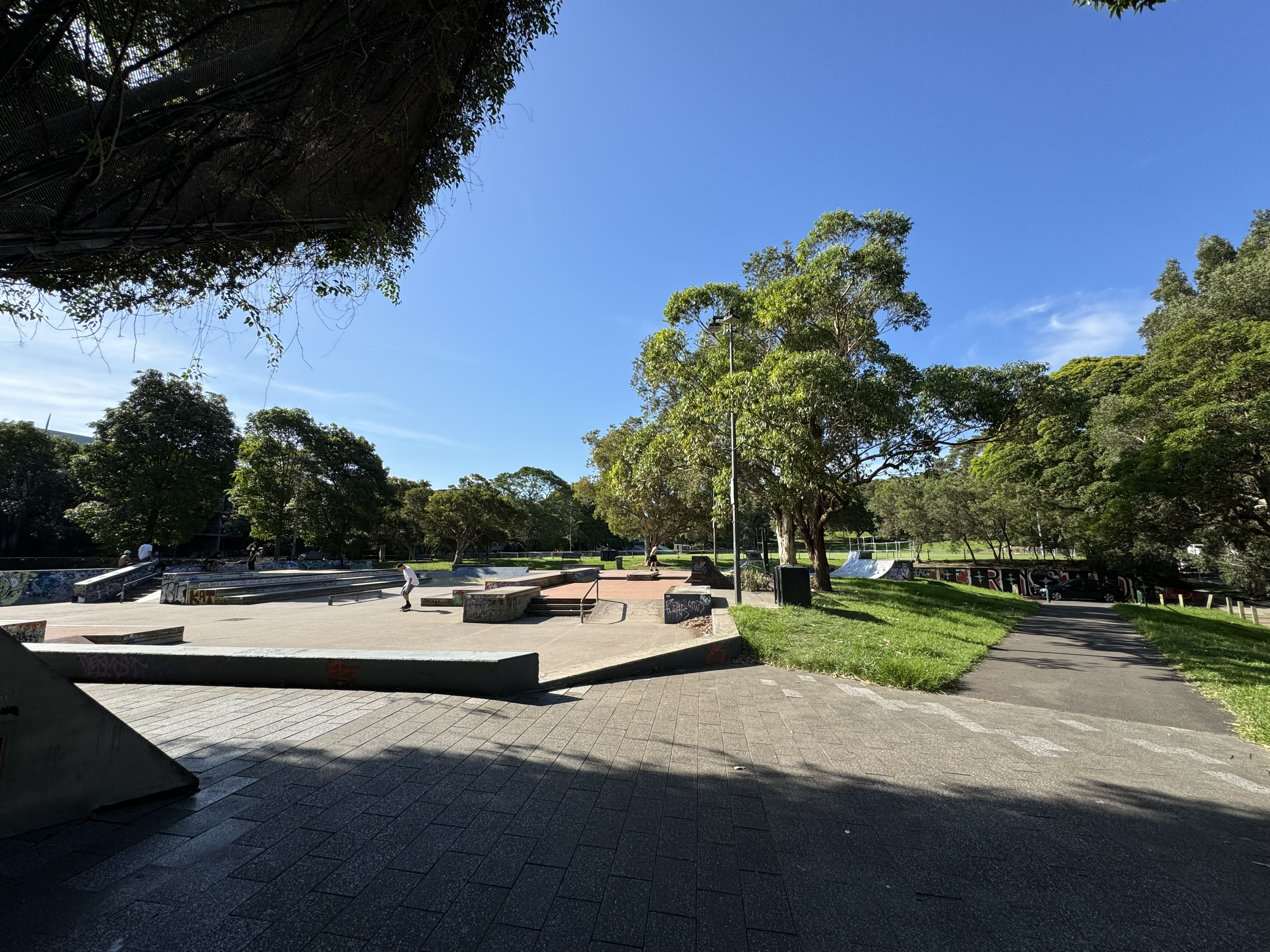
Fernside skate park

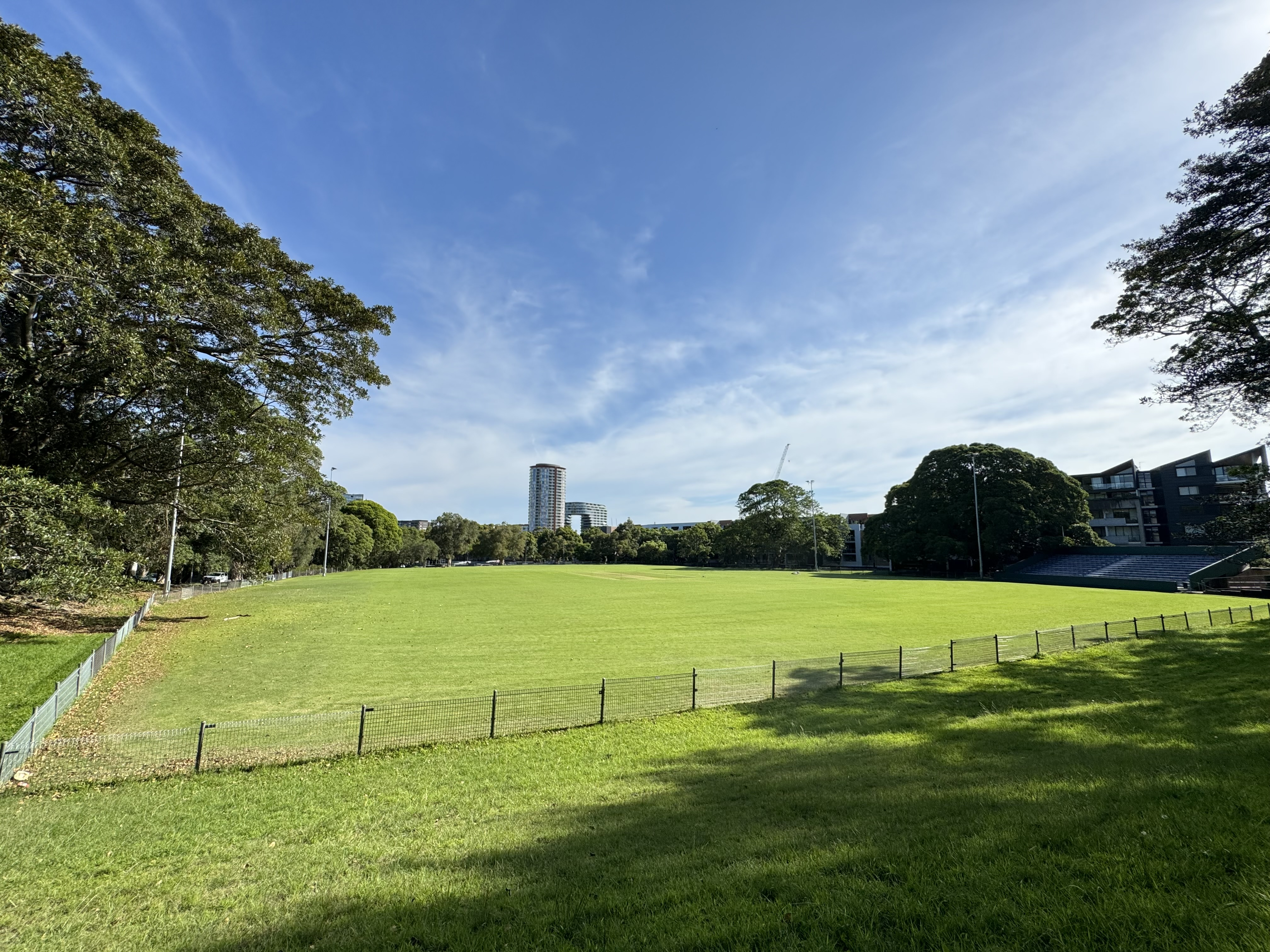
Waterloo Oval

== Notable people ==
- Samuel George Ball, rugby league administrator
- Nellie Cameron, criminal
- Fred Chaplin, rugby league player
- Anne Clark, netball administrator and coach
- Claude Corbett, journalist
- Harold Corbett, rugby league player and soldier
- Tom Dadour, doctor and politician
- Dick Daley, rugby league player
- Jim Davis, rugby league player
- Frank Easton, cricketer
- Reta Mildred Findlay, businesswoman
- Edward Hallstrom, businessman
- Edward Hocking, politician
- Perce Horne, rugby league player
- Ernie Hucker, rugby league player
- Vince Hughes, rugby league player
- Rangi Joass, rugby league player
- Jim Kenny, politician
- Perry Keyes, singer-songwriter
- The Kid LAROI, rapper, singer and songwriter
- George Kilham, rugby league player
- Jack Lawrence, rugby league player
- Vic Lawrence, rugby league player
- Elaine Nile, politician
- Syd Price, Australian Rules footballer
- Alf Sadler, rugby league player
- Eric Spooner, politician
- Clarrie Stevenson, rugby league player
- Pearlie Watling (1905–1996), shale miner and folk musician
- David Watson, rugby league player
- Frank Wilkins, rugby league player
- Ern Wilmot, rugby league player

== See also ==
- Slum clearance
