= City of Sydney Library =

Library network in Sydney, Australia

Coordinates: 33.86219°S 151.21072°E

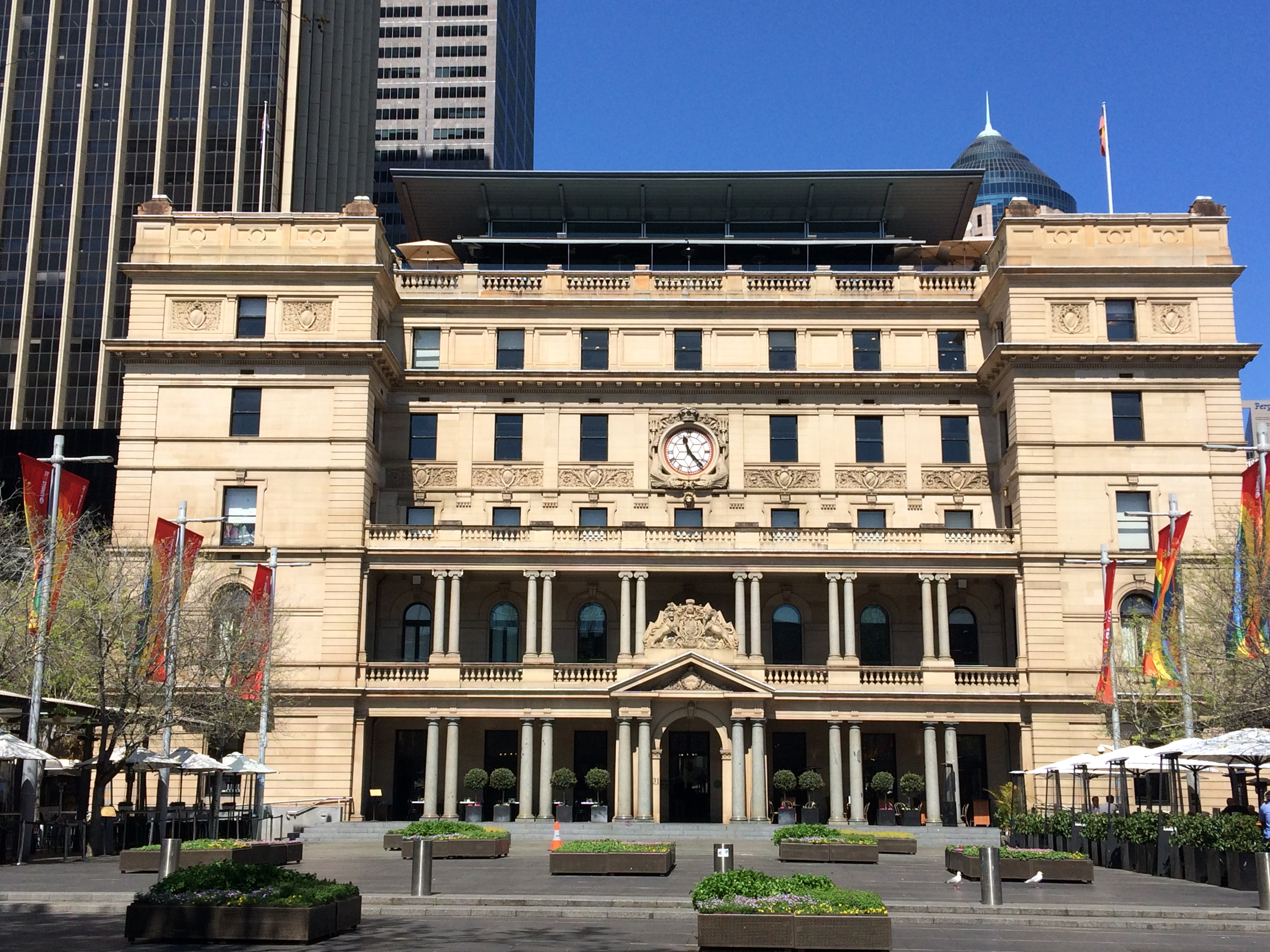
- Customs House Library Branch
- Location: Sydney, Australia
- Established: 1909
- Branches: 9

Collection
- Size: 400,000 books

Other information
- Website: library.cityofsydney.nsw.gov.au

The City of Sydney Library is a library network within the City of Sydney Council administrational area in New South Wales, Australia. The network consists of nine branches.

== History ==
=== Background ===
The first Sydney public library began as the Australian Subscription Library, which opened on 1st of December, 1827, in the Sydney Dispensary building. By 1858, there was a "great want" for a free public library in the city and the council had begun to make plans by 1869, though by 1883 no "definite plans" had yet been made, and the council were still deciding on the location for the first free library. On 1st October 1896, the Australian Subscription Library became the Free Public Library of Sydney.

=== Movement to city ownership ===
In 1909, control of the library passed to the City of Sydney Council, marking the official beginning of City of Sydney Libraries. This provided space for a separate children's library to open in the same year. The first branch libraries opened in 1949 which also provided book deposit stations at a number of local schools. In 1970, the City library moved to yet larger premises within the Queen Victoria Building before taking up residence at 321 Pitt Street in 1984. High rent fees prompted it to move again in 1994 to Town Hall House. In 2005 the Town Hall branch moved to its current location at Customs House at Circular Quay.

== Branches ==
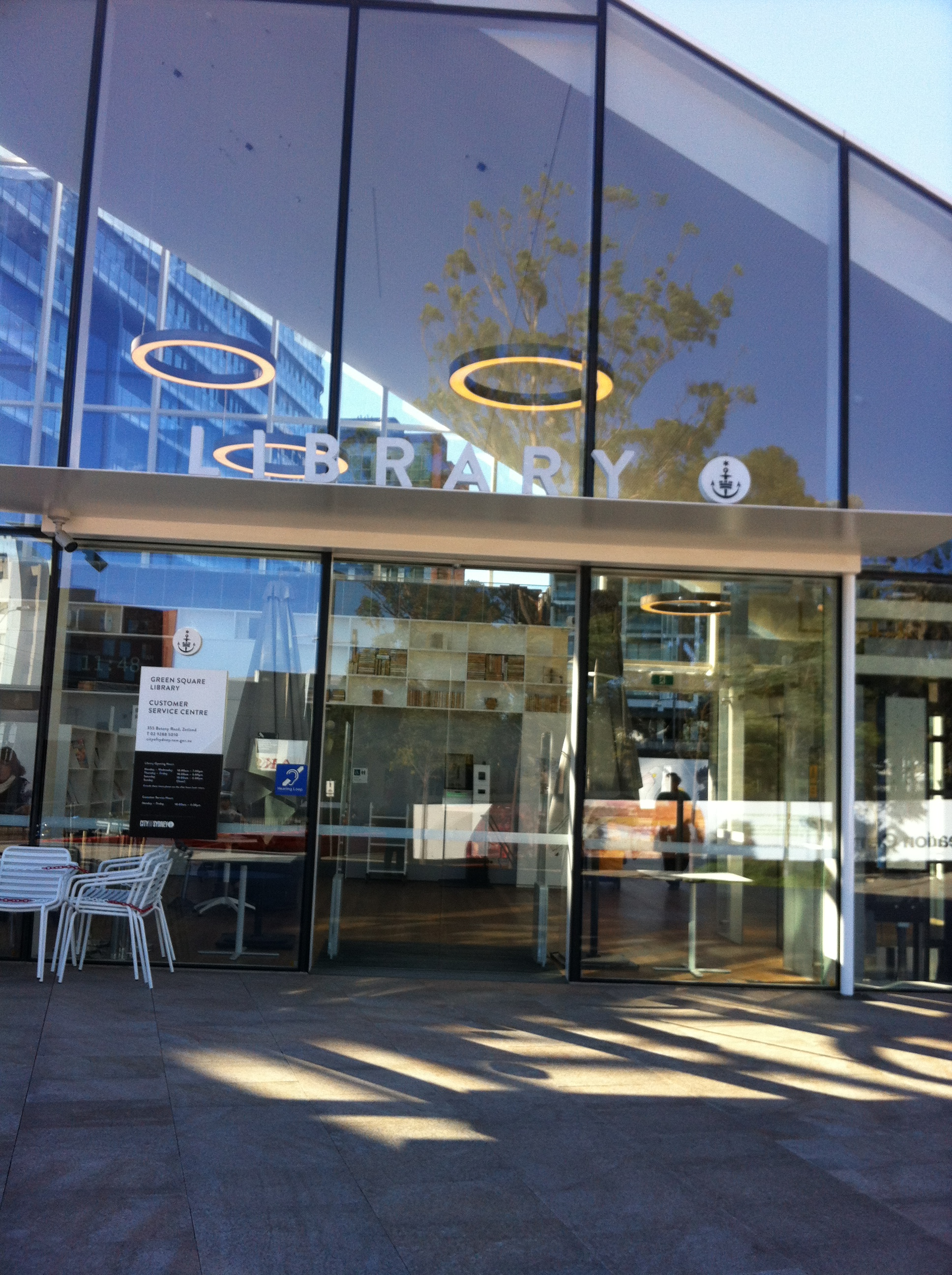
Green Square Library

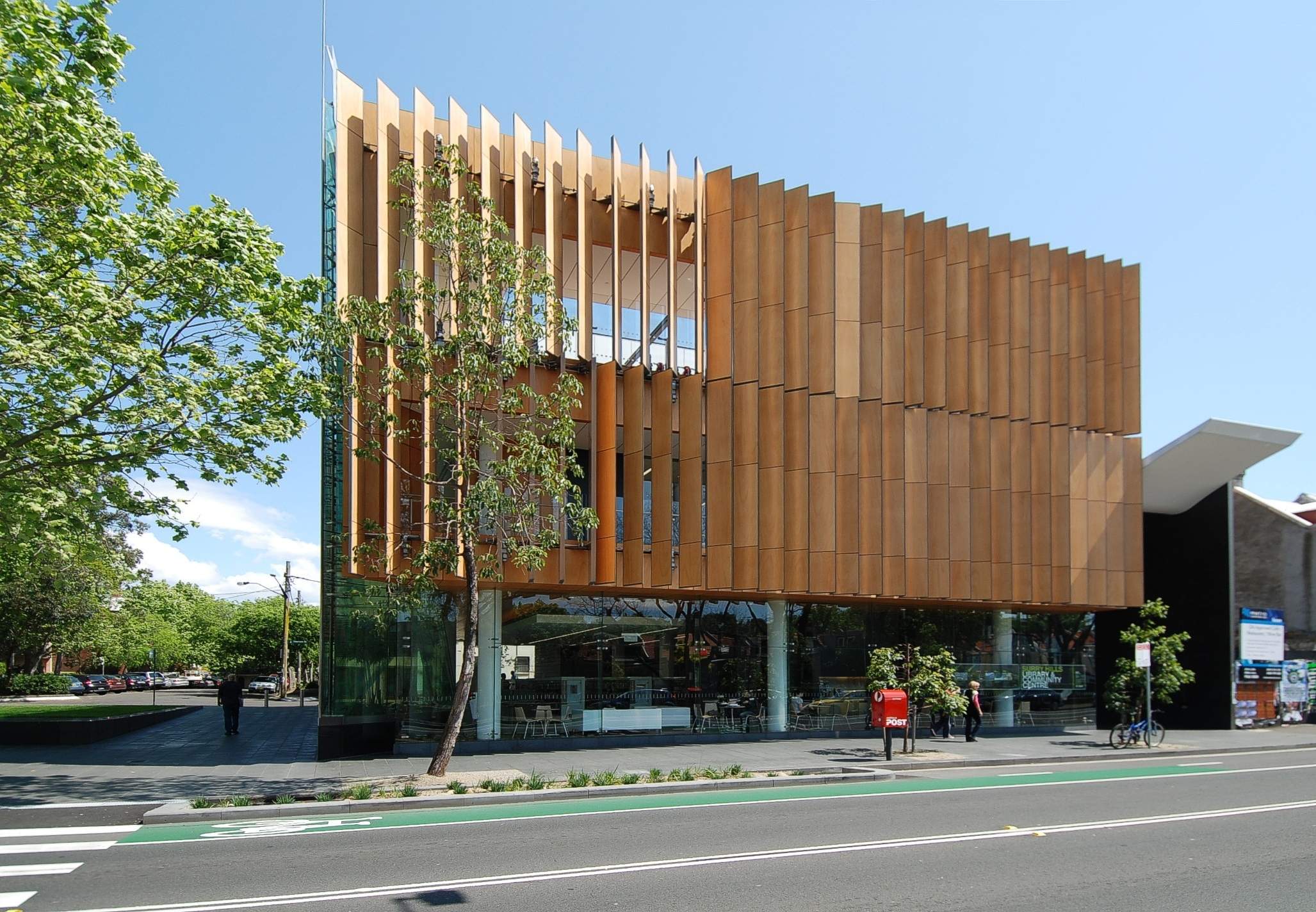
Surry Hills Library Branch

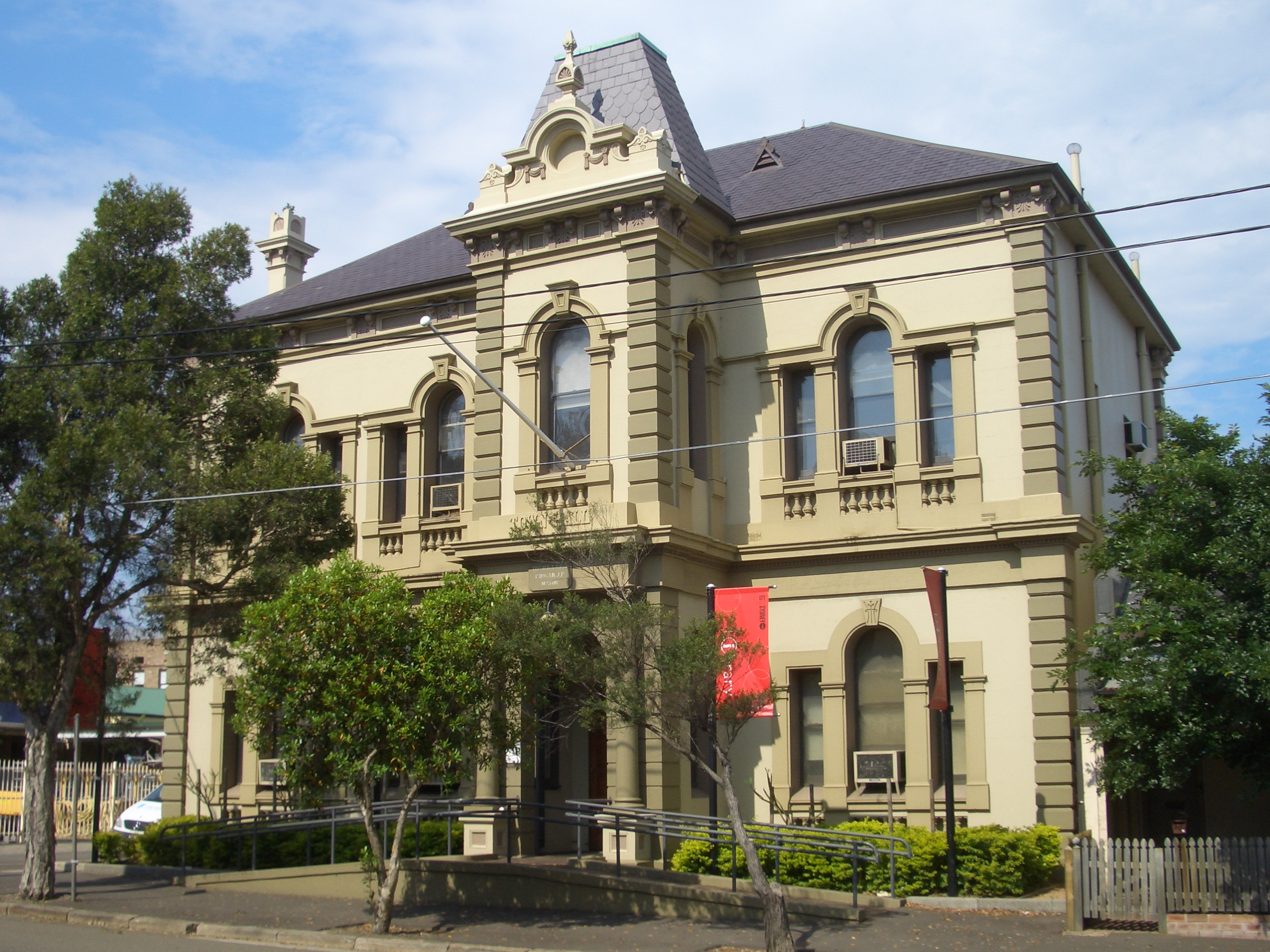
Waterloo Library Branch

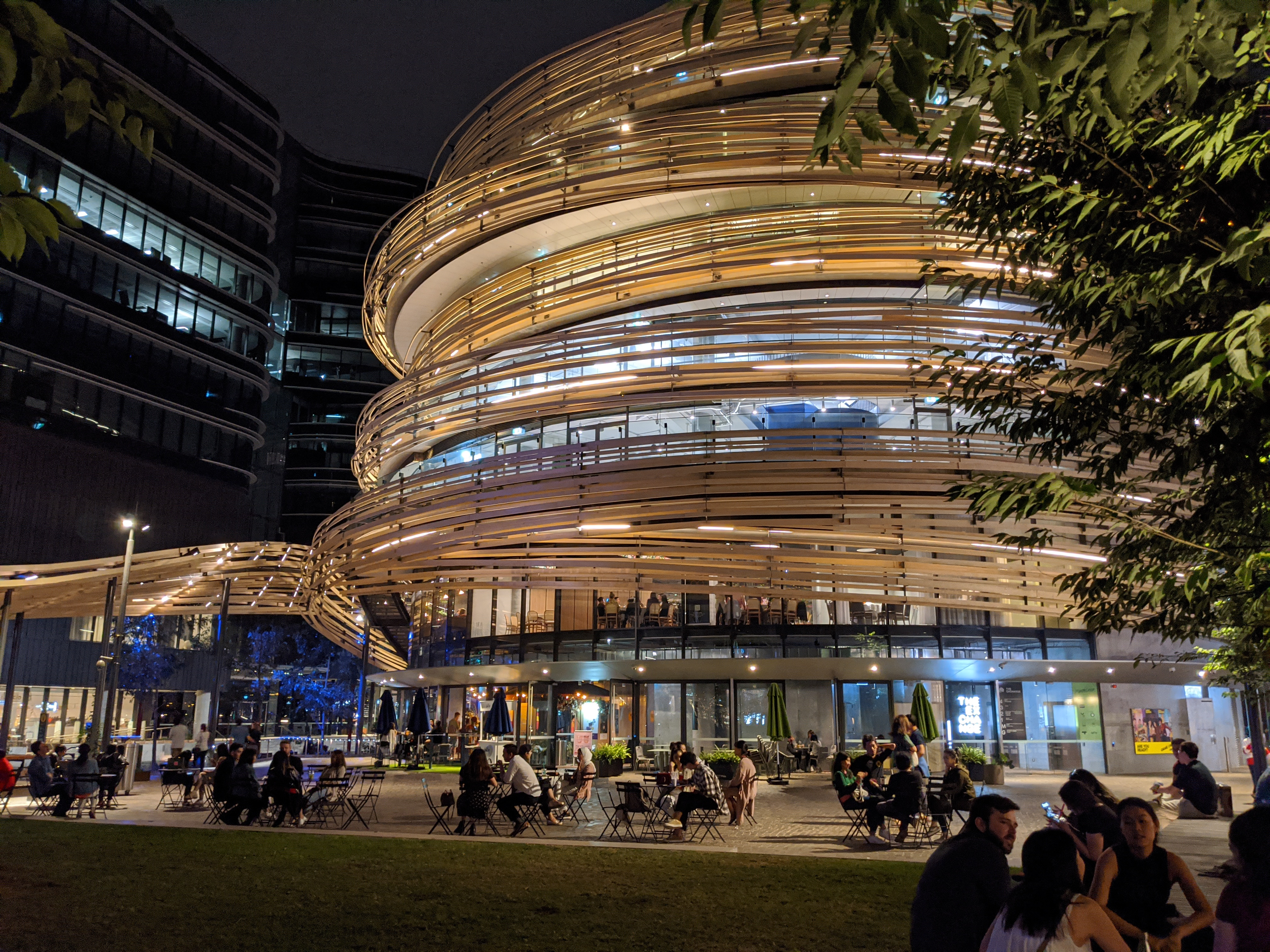
Darling Square Library, Haymarket

- Customs House Library (Circular Quay)
- Darling Square Library (Haymarket)
- Glebe Library (Glebe)
- Green Square Library (Zetland)
- Kings Cross Library (Kings Cross)
- Newtown Library (Newtown)
- Surry Hills Library (Surry Hills)
- Ultimo Library (Ultimo)
- Waterloo Library (Waterloo)

Library Link

- Town Hall Library Express (Town Hall House)
- Pyrmont Link (Pyrmont)

== Collections and services ==
The library has over 400,000 books, as well as CDs, DVDs, magazines, newspapers, and toys, The libraries also provide internet, copying and printing services.

In the Sydney Subject Specialisation Scheme, a Sydney-wide collection development policy which facilitated interlibrary loans prior to computerised union catalogues, the City of Sydney Library maintained a focus on life sciences, engineering and French literature.

The City of Sydney library had a total stock of 461,253 items as of June 2015.

=== Library Link ===
A Library Link has existed in Town Hall House, close to the location of the library's previous premises, since its relocation to Customs House in 2005. The Library Link makes available a number of current newspapers and magazines, a fiction collection, a self-operated check-in and check-out machine and a telephone to contact library staff. Members can pick up books and other material held at other branches at the Library Link by contacting staff. In 2006 a link opened at Pyrmont offering a limited services. People are able to drop off books and pick up items they have asked for during the time that the volunteers are there.

== Membership ==
The library network has around 40,000 active members and processes 1,350,000 loans per year. Membership of the library network is free to residents of the City of Sydney local government area and residents of New South Wales, but expires after three years. Non-NSW residents can became members for one month, but this type of membership has limits.
