= Fred Chaplin (rugby league) =

Australian rugby league footballer

Personal information
- Full name: Frederick William John Chaplin
- Born: 8 July 1909; Waterloo, New South Wales, Australia
- Died: 22 June 1974 (aged 64); Sydney, New South Wales, Australia

Playing information
- Position: Prop, Second-row
Club
Years	Team	Pld	T	G	FG	P
1930–32	South Sydney	10	4	0	0	12
1935–36	Canterbury-Bankstown	14	1	0	0	3
	Total	24	5	0	0	15
- Source: As of 21 February 2019

Fred Chaplin (1909-1974) was an Australian rugby league footballer who played in the 1930s for South Sydney and Canterbury-Bankstown. Chaplin was a foundation player for Canterbury-Bankstown.

== Playing career ==
Chaplin began his career at South Sydney and played a total of 3 seasons at the club.

In 1935, Chaplin joined newly admitted Canterbury-Bankstown and played in the club first ever game against North Sydney at North Sydney Oval on 25 April 1935. Chaplin played a total of 12 games for the club as Canterbury finished second last on the table in its inaugural year.

In 1936, Chaplin only managed to play 2 games for Canterbury and his final game in first grade was against Balmain in Round 15 1936 at the Sydney Cricket Ground.
