= Daniel Cooper (convict and merchant) =

British convict transported to Australia

Daniel Cooper (1785 – 3 November 1853) was a convict transported to New South Wales who became a successful merchant, financier, shipowner and shipping agent.

Transported in 1815, he received a conditional pardon in 1818 and an absolute pardon in 1821. He married in 1819, to convict Hannah Dodd. His first business interests were a general store, an adjoining inn, a small investment in shipping, and a brewery. His fortune developed when he became a partner in the firm of Hutchinson, Terry and Co., (also known as the Waterloo Co.) and in 1825 he and Solomon Levey became the sole owners of the firm, which became generally known as Cooper and Levey. The firm continued to have spectacular success, expanding into importing a full range of goods, pioneering the export of Australian wool, and investing in whaling and sealing expeditions. Six vessels owned by the partners made 14 whaling voyages between 1828 and 1847.

The firm's ships visited many parts of the coast of New Zealand, and other places such as Tahiti. Port Cooper and Port Levy on Banks Peninsula were named for them but the former was renamed Port Victoria by the surveyors of the Canterbury Association, though it subsequently became known as Lyttelton Harbour, after its port town, Lyttelton. Among other properties, the firm acquired the estate of Captain John Piper, which included more than 1,100 acres (4.5 km^{2}) at Woollahra and Rose Bay.

He built Cleveland House, Surry Hills in about 1823–24.

In 1826 Levey left Sydney for England to further the firm's business interests. While he was there, he became involved with Thomas Peel in the colonisation of Western Australia, which was a financial disaster for him, and did not return. Cooper continued to manage the firm. Cooper also built up a personal fortune in real estate, independent of his interest in the firm. He countered the efforts of the Bank of New South Wales to force his firm out of the banking business, and was elected a Governor of the Bank in 1828. In October 1831 Cooper sailed for England. He undertook a general supervision of the firm from England, and appointed managers in Sydney. He died at Brighton, England, on 3 November 1853. His third wife Alice survived him. He had no children but had taken great interest in the education and business training of a nephew who bore his own name (later Sir Daniel Cooper, baronet) and this nephew was his major heir. His nephew became the speaker for the first parliament of New South Wales.

== Flour Business ==
The original partnership from 1820 with Samuel Terry, Thomas White Melville Winder was expanded on in 1821. Danial Cooper was included in a partnership for a mill in Kensington in 1821. Danial Cooper was one of the six partners along with; William Hutchinson, Samuel Terry, Thomas White Melville Winder, George Williams and William Leverton. The Mill was renamed the Lachlan and Waterloo Flour Mills. The partnership traded as Hutchinson, Terry & Co. In 1825 the other partners sold out and he and Solomon Levey became the sole owners of the firm, which became generally known as Cooper and Levey.
