= Reta Mildred Findlay =

Australian businesswoman (1893-1954)

- Born: Reta Mildred Carrad; 1893; Waterloo, Sydney
- Died: 14 June 1954 (aged 60–61)
- Occupation: Businesswoman in fashion

Reta Mildred Findlay (1893–1954) was an Australian-born businesswoman who influenced fashion in Australia and became one of the first businesswomen in the country. She also aided many charity events throughout her lifetime like the Australian Red Cross Society.

== Biography ==
Reta Mildred Findlay was born in 1893 in Waterloo, Sydney. She studied at Fort Street Model School and developed a passion for fashion and theatre.

As a child, she spent considerable amount of her free time painting, reading books, and sketching clothes.

On 19 May 1923, she married George Lanark Findlay. They both moved to Melbourne around 1930. She started working for a publicity firm as a commercial artist.

In 1937, she became an advertising manager, which allowed her to travel to Europe, to attend fashion reviews in both Paris and London. There she found numerous ideas, and returned to Australia to fulfil them.

=== Charity work ===
Reta Mildred aided numerous charity events, mainly organized by the Australian Red Cross Society. She was also a life governor of the Queen Victoria hospital and the Royal Children's Hospital.

=== Death ===
She died on 14 June 1954 from atherosclerotic cardio-renal failure.
