= Frank Wilkins =

Australian rugby league footballer and administrator

Personal information
- Full name: Frank Wilkins
- Born: 2 July 1897; Waterloo, New South Wales, Australia
- Died: 18 August 1951 (aged 54); Darlinghurst, New South Wales, Australia

Playing information
- Position: Second-row, Hooker
Club
Years	Team	Pld	T	G	FG	P
1921–22	St. George	8	0	0	0	0

Frank Wilkins (2 July 1897 – 18 August 1951) was an Australian rugby league footballer who played in the 1920s.

Frank 'Skinny' Wilkins was graded from the Hurstville juniors and played first grade for St. George during the club's foundation year in 1921. He made his first grade debut in a Round 3 game against Western Suburbs on 7 May 1921 at Pratten Park. He went on to play 8 first grade games for the Saints between 1921 and 1922 before retiring.

== War service ==
Wilkins was also a veteran from World War I, serving in the 1st AIF between 1915 and 1918.

== Death ==
Wilkins died on 18 August 1951 at St. Vincents Hospital, Darlinghurst, New South Wales.
