= Pearlie Watling =

Australian miner and folk musician (1905–1996)

- Born: 18 October 1905; Waterloo, Sydney, New South Wales, Australia
- Died: 14 January 1996 (aged 90) Goulburn, New South Wales, Australia
- Genres: Folk
- Instrument: Piano accodian

Pearl Amelia Irene Watling (18 October 1905 – 14 January 1996), better known as Pearlie, was an Australian shale miner, livestock farmer, sheep grazier and folk musician.

== Biography ==
Watling was born on 18 October 1905 in Waterloo, Sydney, New South Wales, Australia. Her parents were William "Billie" Edward Collins, a labourer, and his wife Mary Jane Collins (née Hartley). Her maternal uncles were the folk musicians Frank Collins and Lynn Collins.

Pearlie attended formal schooling for a single day when she was aged 12. That day, when the schoolteacher asked how Paddys River Falls got its name, she said that the river "got its name because it is like an Irishman and it flows backwards," not understanding the joke, and the Irish-born teacher banged her head on the desk. She did not return to school.

As a child, Watling was encouraged to play the violin by her paternal grandfather, but was more talented at the piano accordion. According to her biography, she "came from a long line of folk musicians without formal training. They learned to play by ear, with her grandfather having learned songs from pub musicians while he waited outside the local inn to help his drunken father home."

Watling married Frank Watling, a labourer from Boxers Creek, New South Wales, Australia, on 15 March 1924 in Goulburn, New South Wales, Australia. They had three children. The family lived and worked at Lockyersleigh, then moved to a sheep farm. Watling's father gifted her a small button accordion as a wedding gift.

In World War II, Watling’s husband enlisted in the Australian Citizen Military Force and was killed in action on 11 November 1942 at Kokoda, Papua New Guinea. To support the family, Watling worked in labouring jobs, such as collecting firewood for local brickworks. She was granted a mining lease and worked as a shale miner, digging out "30 tons of shale per week," which she sold to Fowler’s Pottery Works at Marrickville, Sydney, New South Wales.

Alongside her labouring jobs, Watling played a large double-row button accordion at local dances in the small village of Wingello. Many of the folk dance tunes which Watling and other folk musicians played did not have names and were known by their composers. Her 32 bar "Mazurka" was collected by John Meredith. A sound recording of Watling playing clog dance tunes, step dance tunes, swing barn dance tunes and waltzes was recorded in 1983 and is held in the collection of the National Library of Australia.

Watling was interviewed for folklore field recording projects, including by Bill Scott, Meredith and Chris Sullivan. She was featured in Suzy Baldwin's 1988 book Unsung Heroes and Heroines of Australia.

Watling died on 14 January 1996 at Mirambeena Nursing Home in Goulburn, aged 90, and was buried in Goulburn's cemetery.
