= Waterloo Town Hall, Sydney =

Waterloo Town Hall
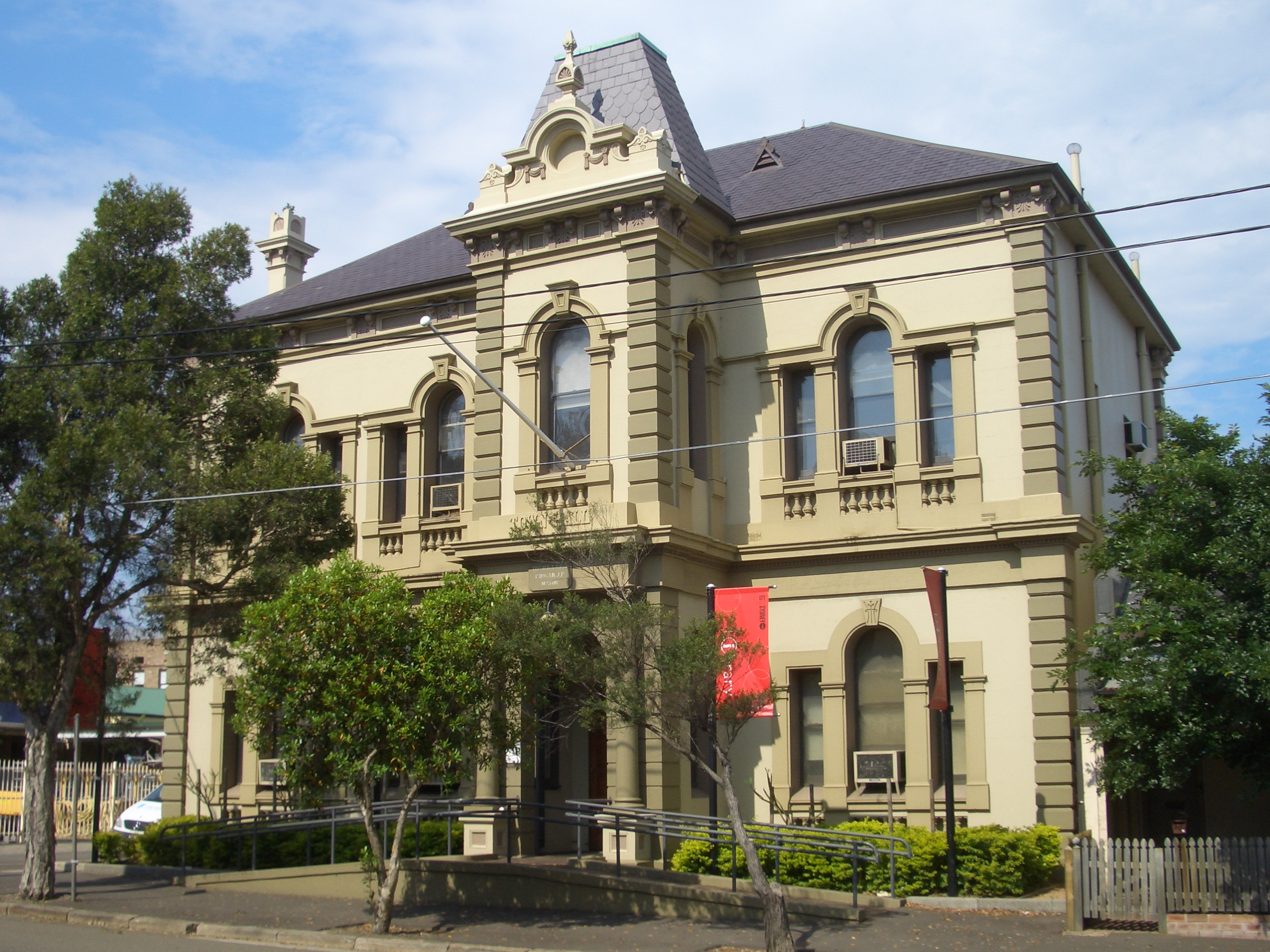
- Waterloo Town Hall, pictured in 2007
- Alternative names: Waterloo Library

General information
- Status: Completed
- Type: Government town hall
- Architectural style: Victorian Italianate style with Second Empire elements
- Location: 770 Elizabeth Street, Waterloo, Sydney, New South Wales, Australia
- Coordinates: 33°53′58″S 151°12′24″E
- Construction started: 1880
- Completed: 1882
- Renovated: 1996–1997
- Client: Waterloo Municipal Council
- Owner: Sydney City Council

Design and construction
- Architects: Edward Hughes; John Smedley; Ambrose Thornley
- Architecture firm: Thornley & Smedley
- Main contractor: Bretnall & Poulton

Renovating team
- Architects: Stephenson and Turner

New South Wales Heritage Database (Local Government Register)
- Official name: Waterloo Town Hall Including Interior and Former Air Raid Shelter
- Type: Built
- Criteria: a., b., c., d., e., f., g.
- Designated: 14 December 2012
- Reference no.: Local register
- Group/collection: Community Facilities
- Category: Town Hall
- Builders: George Bretnall and Arthur Poulton

The Waterloo Town Hall is a heritage-listed town hall located in Waterloo, a suburb of Sydney, New South Wales, Australia. Located at 770 Elizabeth Street, it was built in 1880–82 in the Victorian Italianate architectural style with Second Empire elements by John Smedley, Edward Hughes and Ambrose Thornley. The town hall was the seat of Waterloo Municipal Council from 1882 to 1948 and since 1972 has been the Waterloo Library, a branch of the City of Sydney Library (and formerly South Sydney Library) servicing Waterloo and Alexandria.

== History and description ==
When the Municipality of Waterloo was proclaimed in May 1860, the council first met in a room on Botany Road. However, when the Alexandria part of the council area separated and formed their own municipality in August 1868, the council met in a room in Wellington Street, Waterloo, until they commissioned the new Town Hall in 1880. In 1880 the council leased a block of land in Elizabeth Street for the town hall, and was obtained from the Cooper family at a rental of £10 per annum. The council continued to pay this rental until 1912, when Sir William Cooper, 3rd Baronet, gave the council the freehold title to the land.

The Town Hall was commissioned to a Victorian-Italianate with Second Empire influences design by Architect Edward Hughes, with construction supervised by Ambrose Thornton Jnr and John Smedley, of the firm Thornley & Smedley. However the construction of the Hall, undertaken by builders Bretnall & Poulton, went through several cost blow-outs, delays and enlargements, with a final cost of £3500 (from an original cost of £2600) with a £370 annual cost in interest payments. Waterloo Municipal Council first met in the hall on 19 August 1882.

In 1915 a 'Social Hall' was commissioned and built to the rear of the existing hall, and it was unveiled by Mayor Dunning on 24 February 1915 During the Second World War an air-raid shelter was built in the town hall, and is one of the few surviving examples left in Sydney. On 21 April 1941, William McKell, Leader of the NSW Opposition and the local MP for Redfern, gave a policy speech launching his campaign for the 1941 state election at the town hall. In February 1946, Mckell announced his intention to retire as Premier and from politics at the town hall.

=== Later history ===
Following the amalgamation of Waterloo into the City of Sydney in 1949, the hall continued its use as a social venue and community centre and was transferred to the South Sydney Municipality in 1967 following a boundary change. In 1972, the South Sydney Council made the town hall a library, which was then transferred to be a branch of the City of Sydney Libraries upon reamalgamation in 1982 and 2004. On 26 July 1990 a bronze plaque, created by sculptor Victor Cusack, was unveiled at Waterloo Town Hall by Valerian Wellesley, 8th Duke of Wellington, to commemorate the relationship between Waterloo's naming with the Battle of Waterloo in 1815. It is the earliest conflict commemorated in Sydney. In 1996 the Town Hall was substantially refurbished by Architects Stephenson and Turner, through the NSW Government State Library's Grant Program and South Sydney Council. A plaque to commemorate the completion of these works was unveiled by the Mayor of South Sydney Council, Vic Smith on 28 June 1997.

=== Heritage listing and conservation ===
The Town Hall, along with the Air-Raid shelter at the rear, is listed under the 2012 Sydney Local Environment Plan as "evidence of the former Municipality of Waterloo and as an important local landmark of over 125 years standing [...] The Town Hall is the most readily identifiable symbol of what was once an area with a fiercely independent local identity." The listing also noted that a substantial number of original internal fittings survive: "The only substantial loss to have occurred is the removal of the cast iron ornamented verandah that once graced the Elizabeth Street elevation. The loss of this verandah, while an important element of this particular building, has had only a minor impact on the understanding that the building provides of the Italianate Style. The Town Hall retains a high percentage of original fabric." The 2003 Waterloo Heritage Conservation Area plan has recommended the reinstatement of the original verandahs and iron railings and fencing that were lost.

== Gallery ==
Waterloo Town Hall c. 1916, showing the original ironwork verandahs and fencing

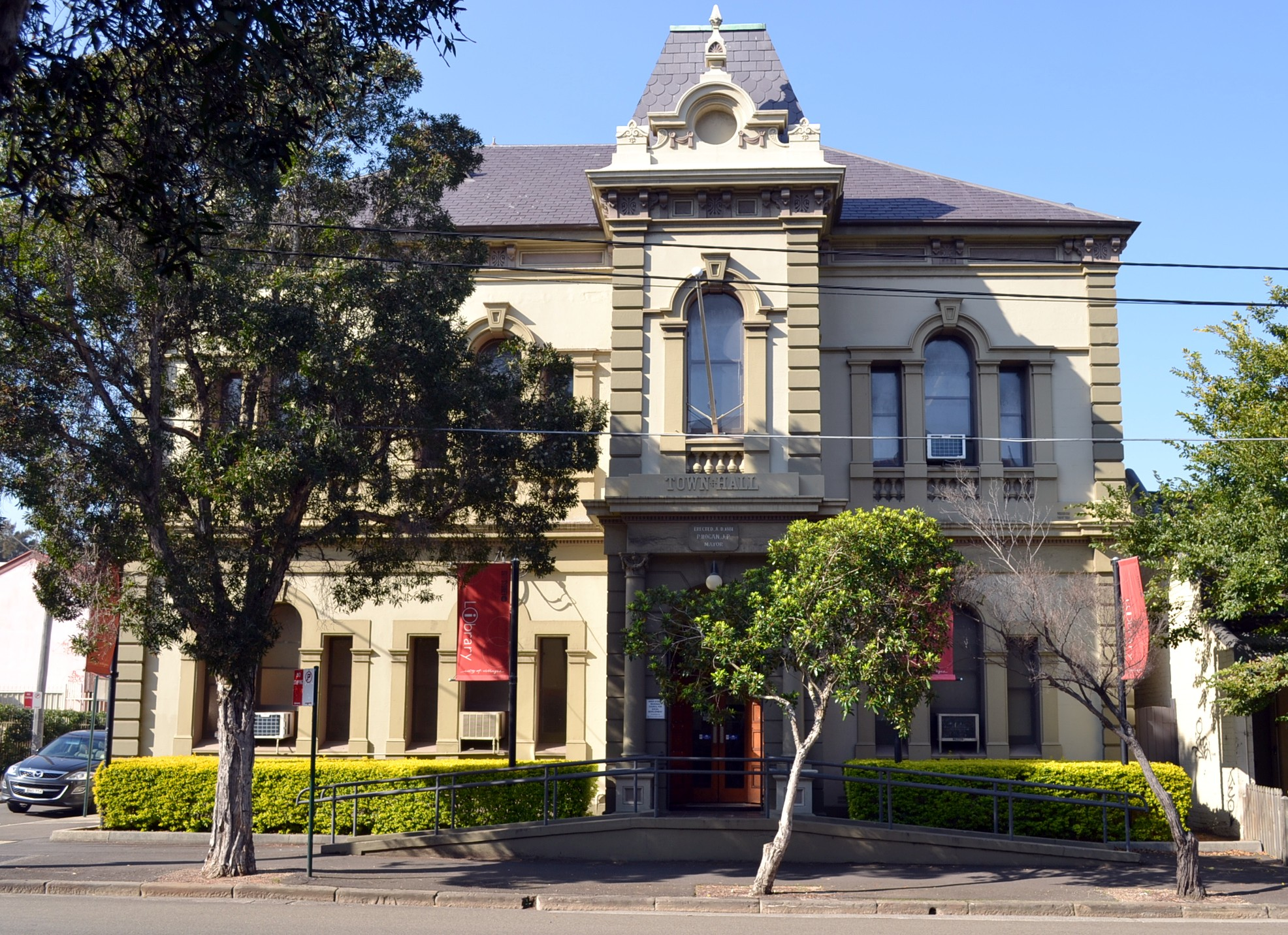
Waterloo Town Hall, pictured in 2011

== See also ==
- List of town halls in Sydney
- Architecture of Sydney
