= Customs House, Sydney =

Museum in Sydney, New South Wales, Australia

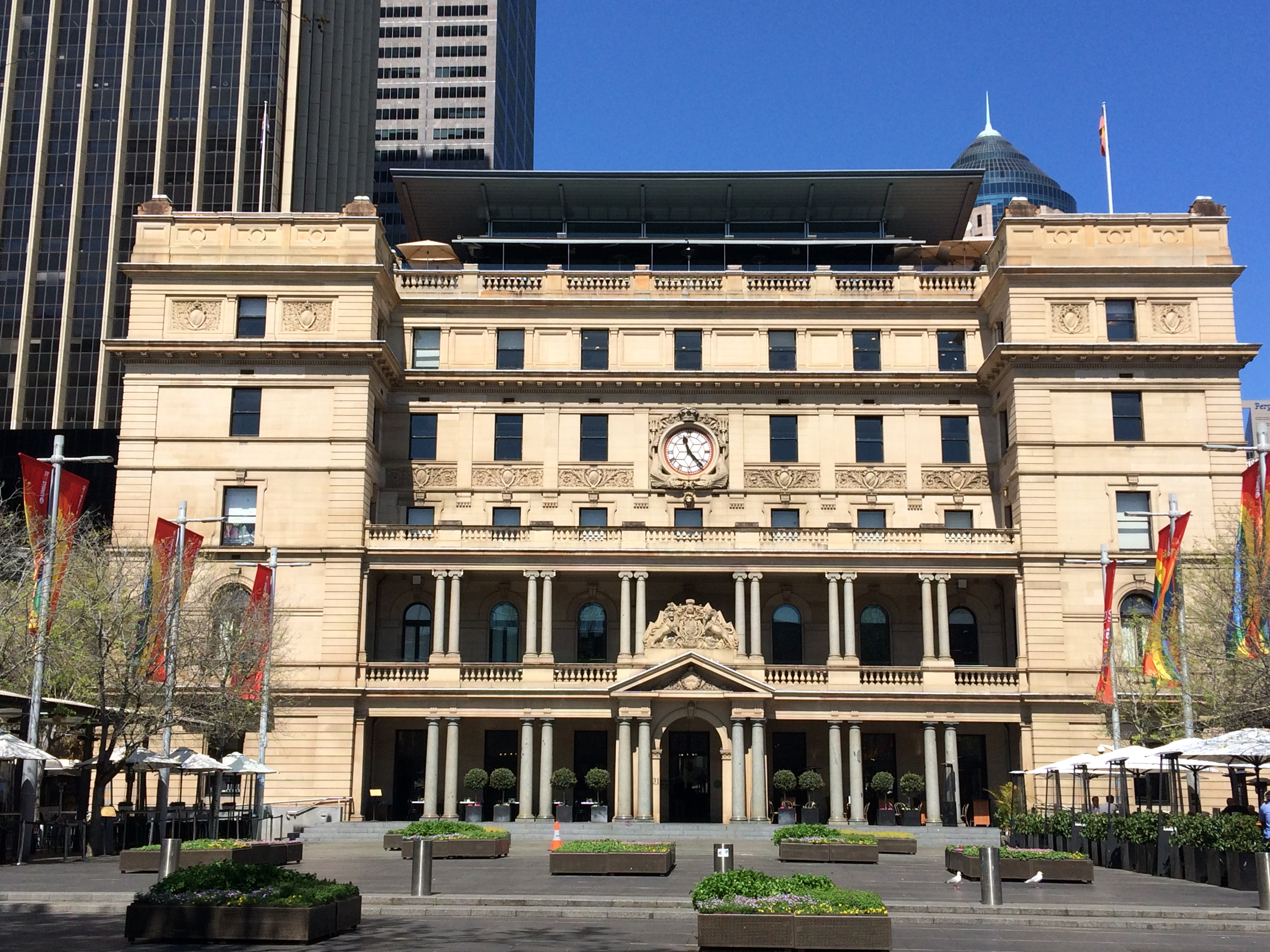
- Front facade

- Location within Sydney

General information
- Status: Completed
- Type: Government administration: Former head office for New South Wales operations of the Australian Customs Service; Tourist and Hospitality Venue; City of Sydney Library
- Architectural style: Victorian Georgian
- Location: 45 Alfred Street, Circular Quay, Sydney CBD, New South Wales, Australia
- Coordinates: 33°51′44″S 151°12′39″E
- Construction started: 1844
- Completed: 1845, 1887
- Opened: 1845
- Owner: Council of the City of Sydney

Technical details
- Floor count: 6

Design and construction
- Architects: Mortimer Lewis (1844–1845); James Barnet (1885–1887); Walter Liberty Vernon (1896–1903); George Oakeshott (1915–1917)
- Architecture firm: New South Wales Government Architect

Commonwealth Heritage List
- Official name: Sydney Customs House (former)
- Criteria: A.4, D.2, E.1, F.1 and H.
- Designated: 22 June 2004
- Reference no.: 105436

New South Wales Heritage Register
- Official name: Customs House (former); Site of former Customs House
- Type: State heritage (built)
- Criteria: a., c., d., e., f.
- Designated: 2 April 1999
- Reference no.: 727
- Type: Office building
- Category: Government and Administration

Customs House is a heritage-listed museum space, visitor attraction, commercial building and performance space located at Circular Quay in Sydney, New South Wales, Australia. The building served as a customs house prior to Federation and then as the head office of New South Wales operations of the Government of Australia agency Department of Trade and Customs (and its successors) until 1988. The customs function relocated to a new site in 1990. The initial designs were by Mortimer Lewis and it was built during 1845 by under the administration of Governor Sir George Gipps. It is also known as Customs House (former) and Site of former Customs House. The site was added to the Commonwealth Heritage List on 22 June 2004; and to the New South Wales State Heritage Register on 2 April 1999.

Ownership was transferred to the City of Sydney Council in 1994, when it became a venue for exhibitions and private functions. After being refurbished in 2003, it has also become the new home of the City of Sydney Library. The ground floor of the building houses a 4.2-by-9.5-metre (14 ft × 31 ft) scale model of Sydney's city centre viewed through a glass floor. The model was built by Modelcraft in 1998 and weighs one tonne. Images of the various versions of the building across its history are also displayed on the ground floor.

== History ==
People of the Eora tribe are said to have witnessed from the site, in 1788, the landing of the First Fleet. Convict David O'Connor was hanged on the site in 1790 and it is said that his ghost haunts the Customs House to this day, offering people rum.

The first Customs house in Sydney was built in 1800. Its location is presumed to be at or near the spot of the landing and official flagraising on the arrival of the First Fleet in 1788. This event marked the foundation of the colony of New South Wales. The site has been occupied by buildings ever since.

The driving force behind the construction of the later sandstone edifice on Circular Quay was Colonel John George Nathaniel Gibbes, the Collector of Customs for New South Wales for a record term of 25 years from 1834 to 1859. Colonel Gibbes persuaded the Governor of New South Wales, Sir George Gipps, to begin construction of the Customs House in 1844 in response to Sydney's growing volume of maritime trade. The building project also doubled as an unemployment relief measure for stonemasons and laborers during an economic depression which was afflicting the colony at the time.

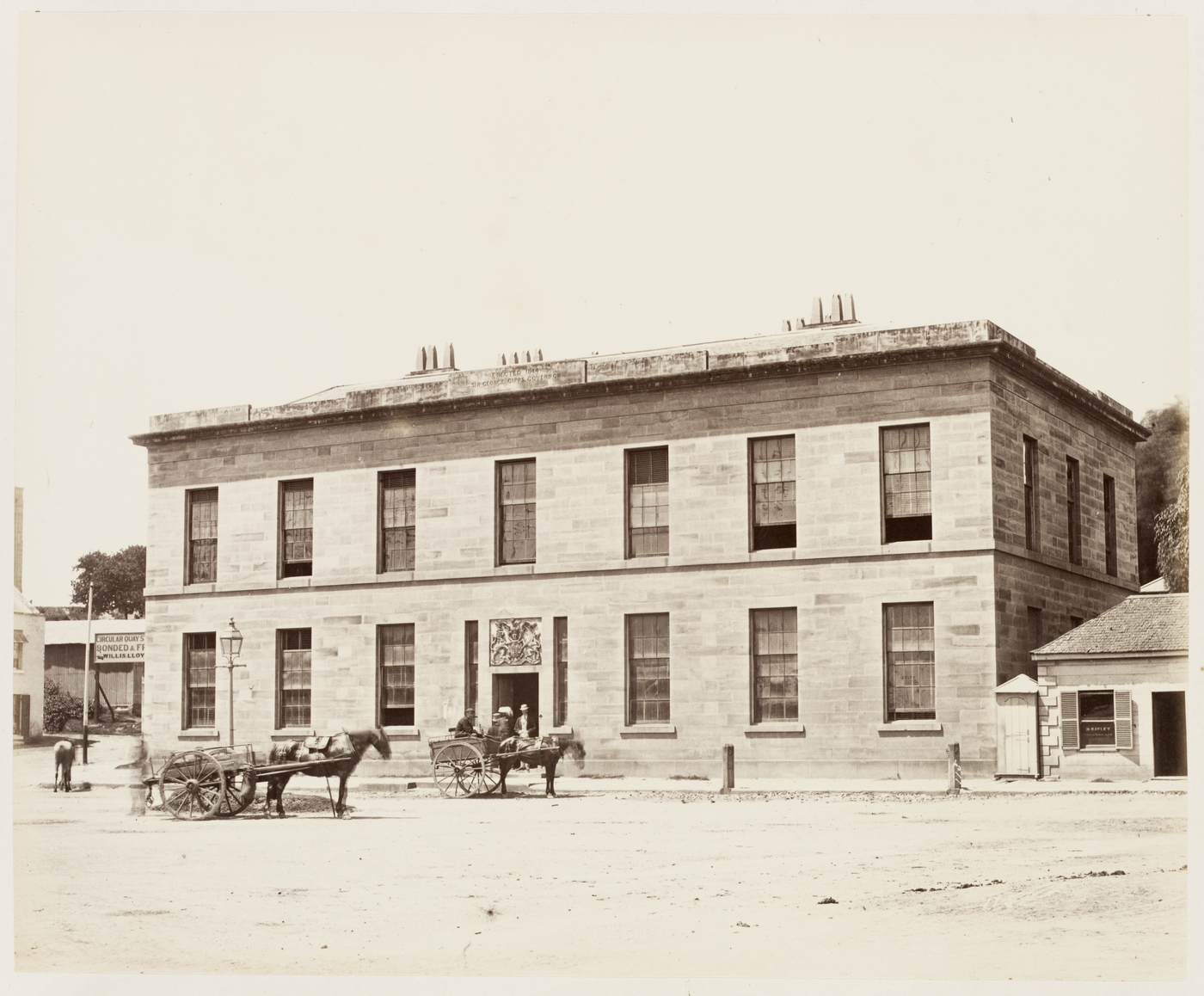
Customs House in its original form, 1872

The site at Circular Quay was chosen in 1843 to house the Customs Service for the rapidly growing colony. They were responsible for all imports and exports, excise on locally manufactured goods, immigration control, control of narcotic substances and morally corrupt goods such as books and films. During the war years this included items of enemy origin, or having socialistic or communistic tendencies. Accordingly, areas for storage, administration and public business were included in the original design of the building. As trade increased, so did pressures on space within the Customs House and two new wings were constructed between 1883 and 1889. These wings provided accommodation for the Shipping Office and Maritime Board. The Customs House opened for business in 1845 and replaced cramped premises at The Rocks. It was partially dismantled and expanded to three levels under the supervision of the then Colonial Architect, James Barnet, in 1887. Various additions were made over the next century, particularly during the period of World War I, but some significant vestiges of the original Gibbes-Lewis building remain.

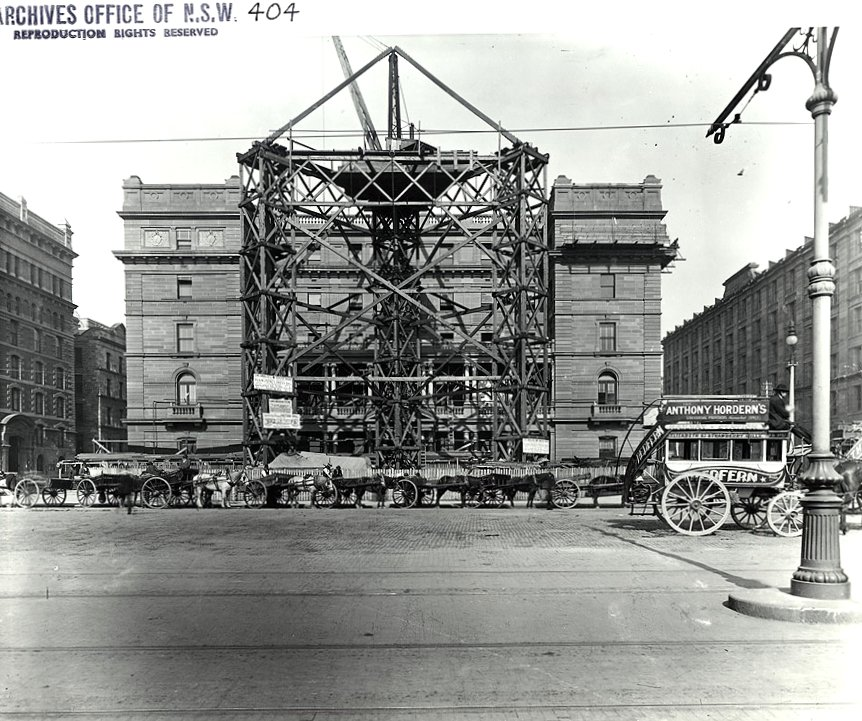
Construction in 1900

These demands increased again with the approach of Federation. Custom's roles of immigration control and administration of tariffs were major reasons for Federation. They became, at this time, the major revenue raiser for the Commonwealth Government. Extensions were timed to coincide with the change in government. More floors were added to cope with new and expanding duties brought about by the massive political change. More revisions were made between 1915 and 1917 to further accommodate these changes and pressures brought about by the war.

Few major structural changes have occurred between 1917 and 1995. This reflects the movement of international shipping away from Circular Quay to other areas of the City and the State.

From 15 June 1990 operations of the Customs Service were relocated to a new site. Ownership was then transferred from the Australian Government to the City of Sydney Council in 1994. The building underwent several rounds of refurbishment over the following years. It was refurbished in 1996-7 to become a venue for exhibitions and private functions. A further round of refurbishment was completed in 1999, converting the building into the "tourism gateway" to Sydney ahead of the 2000 Summer Olympics. The building contained galleries, a museum, bars, cafes and a restaurant, as well as performance and exhibition space. A 1:500 scale model of the City of Sydney CBD was also installed at this time. The building was further refurbished in 2003 to house the main City of Sydney Library, moved here from Town Hall. The scale model of the city was also re-instated at this time under a glass floor on Ground level, where it remains a focal point enabling visitors to the city to orient themselves while gaining a birds-eye view of their surroundings. .

== Description ==
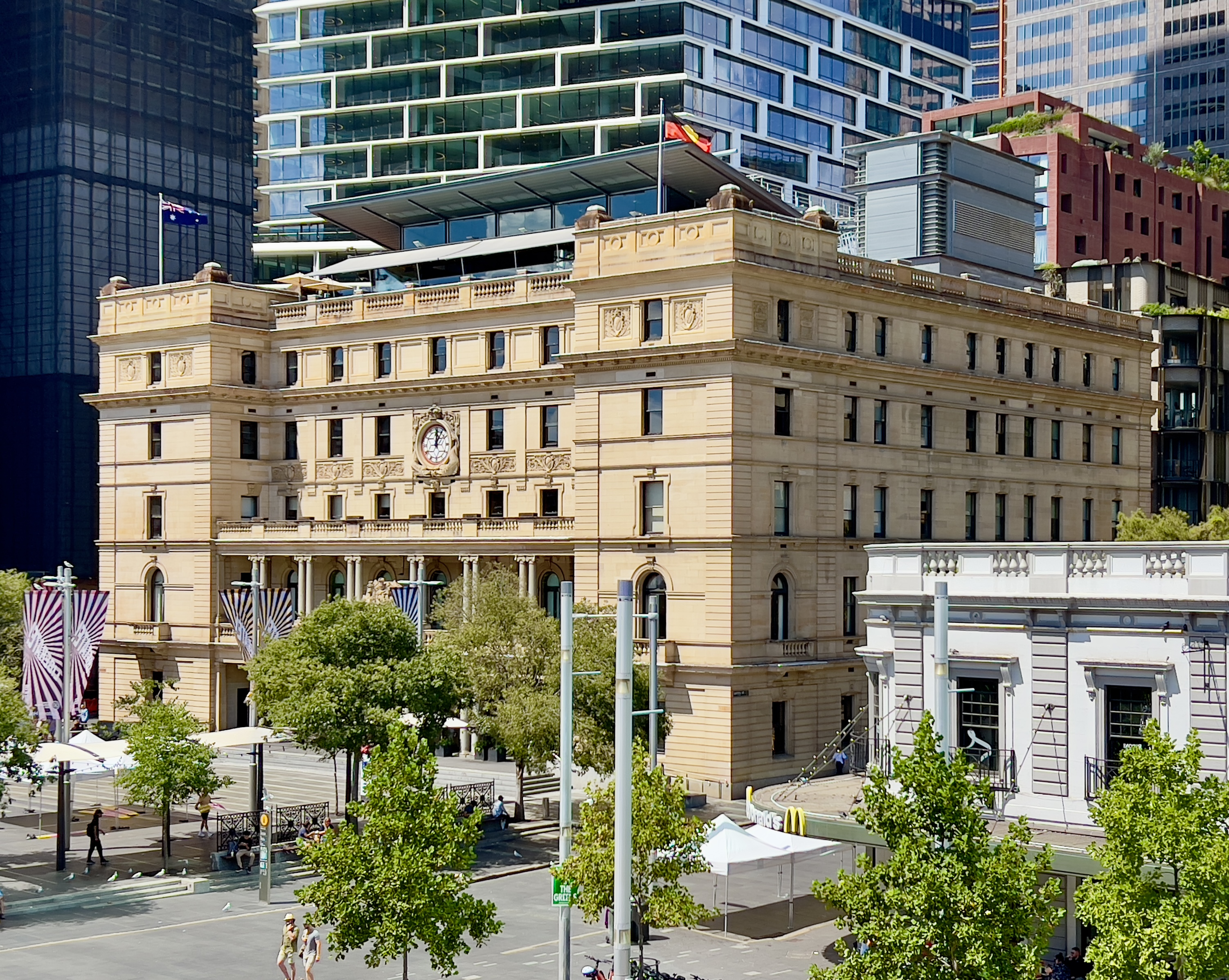
Façade

The two-storey Georgian structure was designed by Mortimer Lewis and featured thirteen large and expensive windows in the facade to afford a clear view of shipping activity in Sydney Cove. Colonel Gibbes, who dwelt opposite Circular Quay on Kirribilli Point, was able to watch progress on the Customs House's construction from the verandah of his private residence, Wotonga House (now Admiralty House).

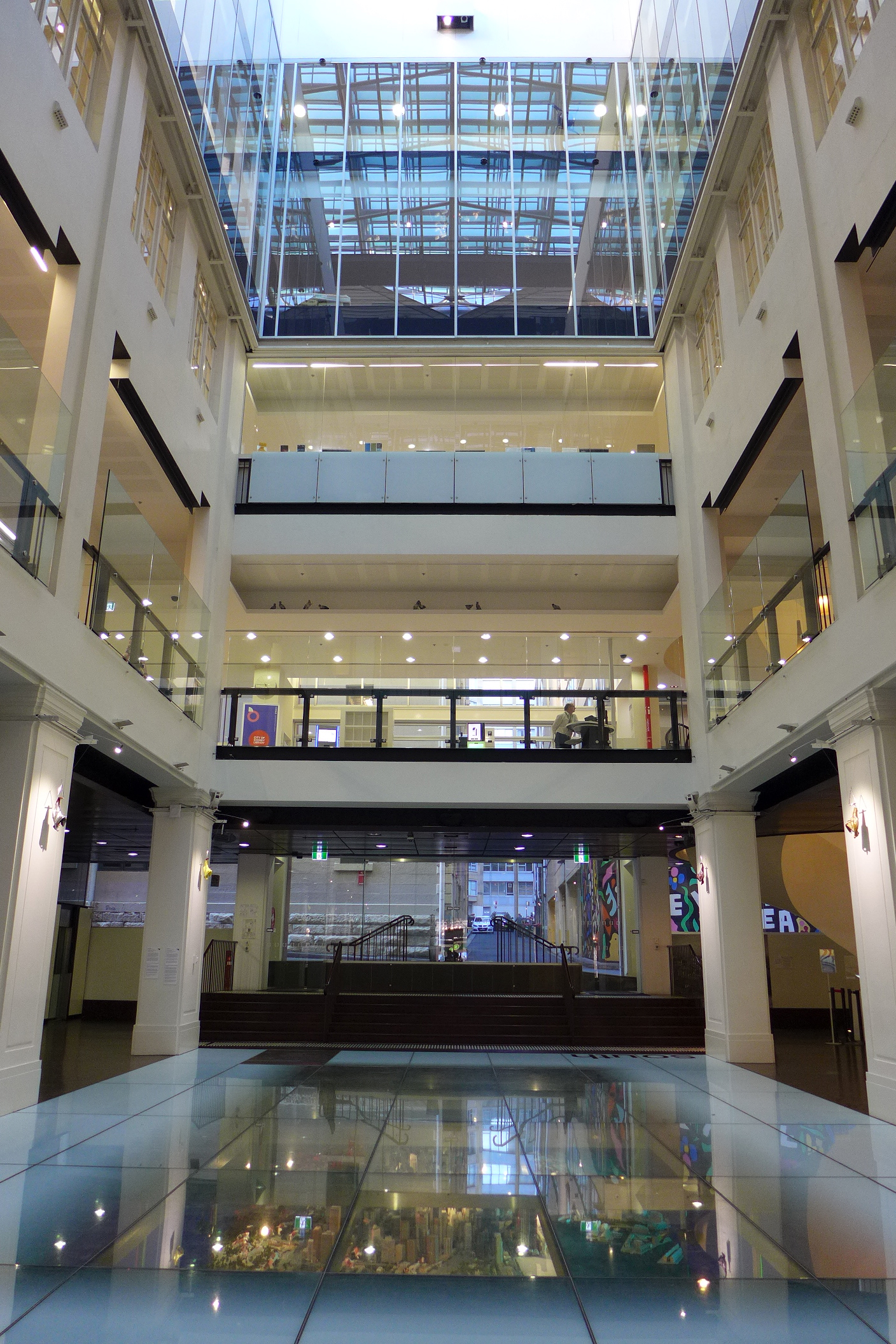
Atrium

The building is a composite load-bearing and framed structure. The external masonry walls range from 680 to 750 millimetres (27 to 30 in) thick, with internal walls approximately 200 millimetres (7.9 in). Internal beams vary in fabric from wood to steel. The load-bearing masonry on the perimeter of the building and the steel-framed structure in the core are fairly readily separable in the upper reaches of the building, though the edges of concrete floors do bear on the earlier masonry at the perimeter of the framed structure of the core. The panel walls contained in the 1917 frame are of brick. Floors in the perimeter building are generally suspended timber, joisted with added steel beams, while the framed core has reinforced concrete two-way slabs. Lift shafts exist on the central axis of the building.

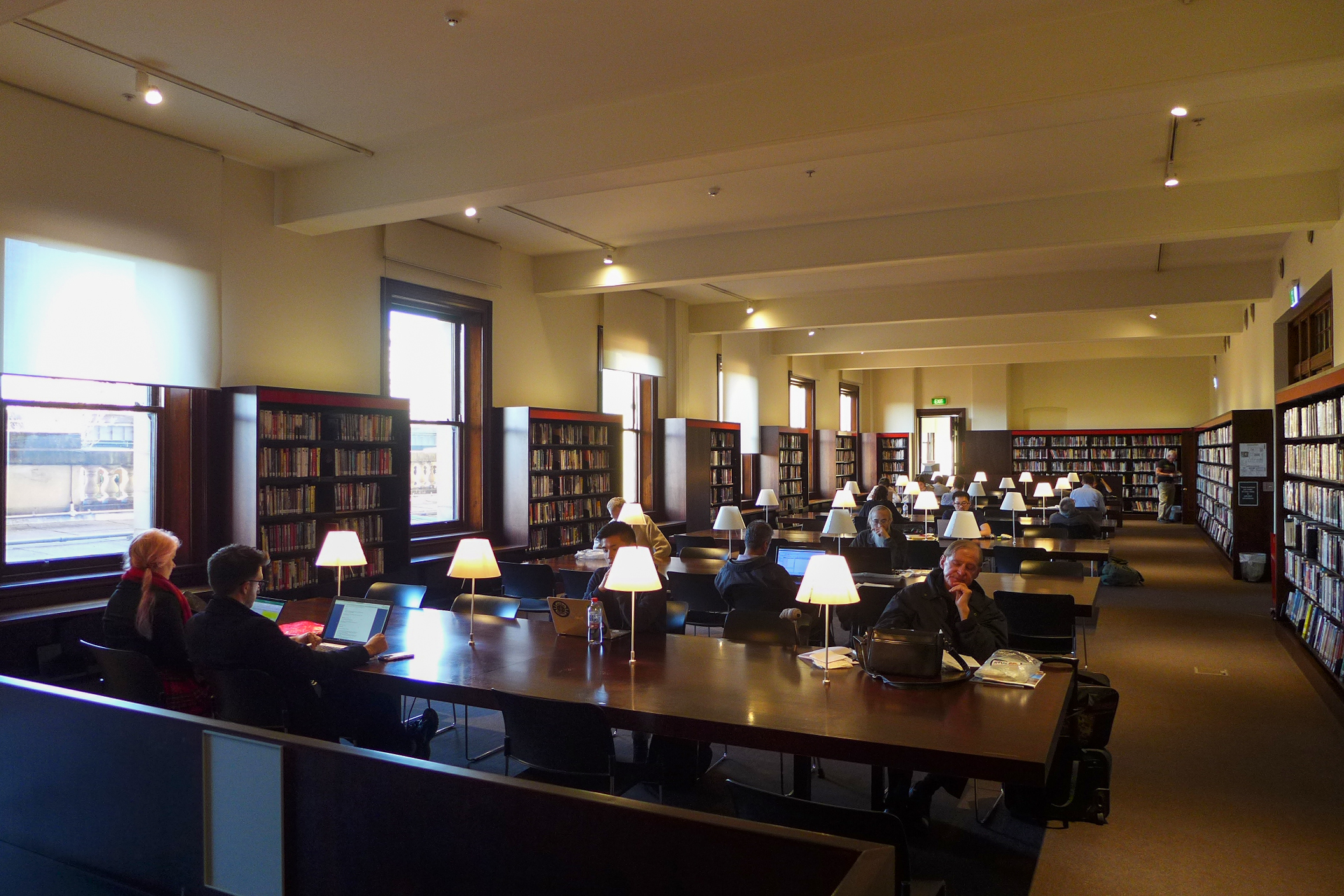
Library

The roof is a pitched roof on king-post trusses finished with Marseilles tiles of Australian make. Extensive box-gutters run around the perimeter of the 1903 roofs.

Internal walls are finished with lime plaster, repaired with cement render. Some areas have significant plaster mouldings. Ceiling types are mixed. Window joinery, doors and architraves are generally french polished or varnished. Windows are timber, of french door and vertical sliding sash types, where overlooking the street.

=== Condition ===
Recent conservation measures have returned the building to excellent physical condition. The archaeological potential is medium.

=== Modifications and dates ===
- 1885–1887: James Barnet architect. Original building partially dismantled and rebuilt to three storeys with side wings, to form a U-shape in plan.
- 1896–1903: W.L. Vernon architect. Two phases of alterations resulting in the addition of two new floors and a wing in the rear courtyard, forming an E-shape in plan.
- 1915–1917: George Oakeshott architect. All building enclosed by the former U-shape was replaced by a framed structure. This opened the ground floor as a large space with a lightwell. A sixth storey comprising caretakers quarters was added.
- 1925–1990: various additions by the Commonwealth Department of Works.
- 1996–1997: Conservation and Refurbishment Project – opened June 1997.

== Heritage listing ==
On 22 June 2004, the building was added to the Commonwealth Heritage List.

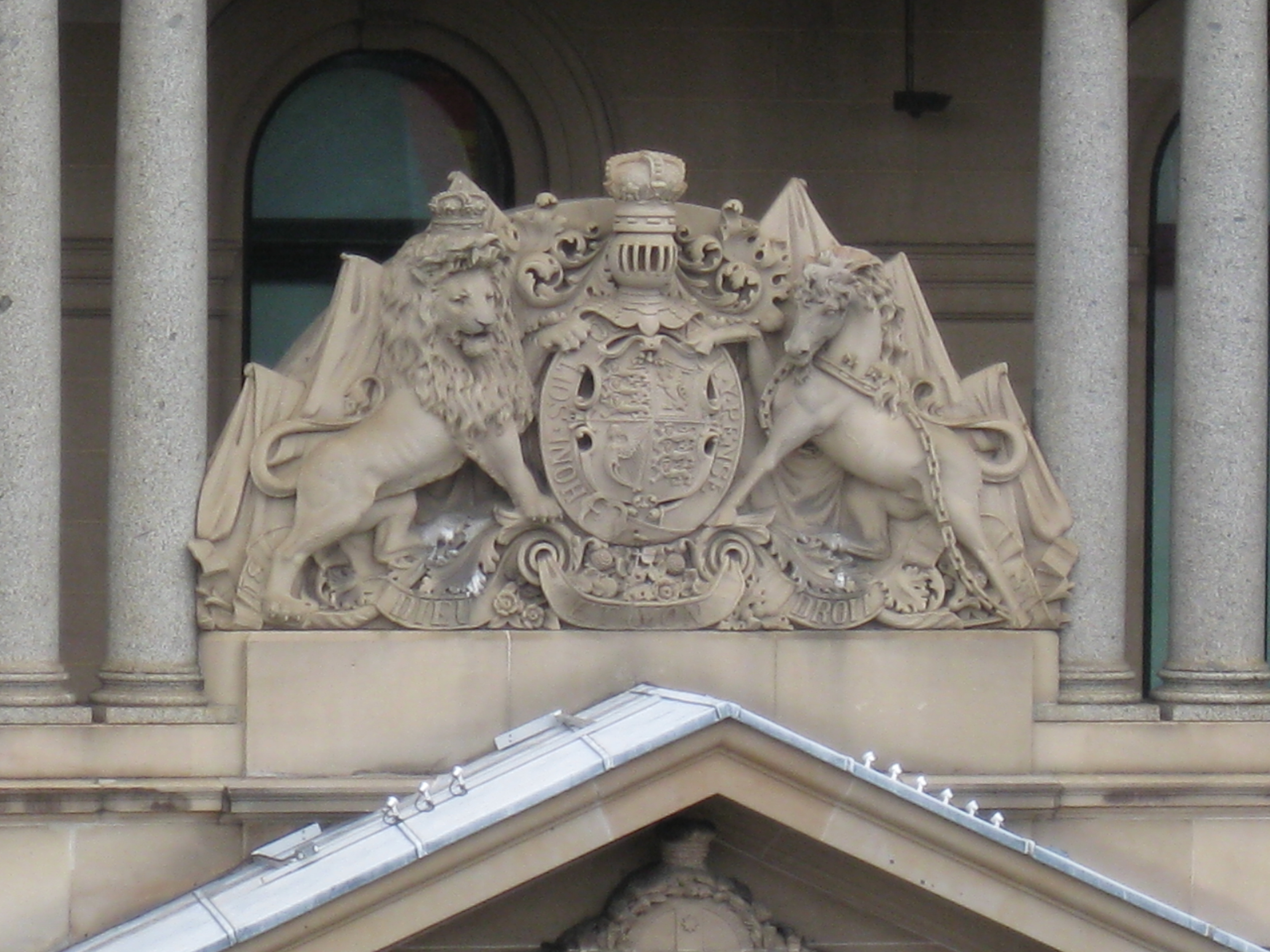
Royal arms of the British monarch. The coat features the motto of English monarchs, Dieu et mon droit, and the motto of the Order of the Garter, Honi soit qui mal y pense

The Sydney Customs House occupies a unique symbolic and physical position on the site of the First Fleet Landing. Its location is a physical reminder of the importance of Circular Quay as the original maritime centre for the colony. The Customs House contains parts of the oldest surviving building of its type in Australia, used continuously for 145 years. It is a physical record of the history of the Customs Service and its importance in the history of Australia. The Customs House embodies the work of three successive and individually distinguished government architects: Mortimer Lewis, James Barnet and Walter Liberty Vernon.

Because of the scarcity of documentary evidence about the early stages of construction, the surviving building fabric from these stages constitutes the principal source of additional evidence about the early history of the building and its occupants.

Customs House, Sydney was listed on the New South Wales State Heritage Register on 2 April 1999 having satisfied the following criteria.

The place is important in demonstrating the course, or pattern, of cultural or natural history in New South Wales.

The Sydney Customs House occupies a unique symbolic and physical position on the site of the First Fleet landing. This historical event has enormous significance to the history of Australia. Its location is a physical reminder of the importance of Circular Quay as the original maritime centre for the colony and is a significant symbol of British imperial sovereignty and colonial commercial expansion. The Customs Service was the only revenue collector in an outpost of Empire struggling for economic survival. It later became a watchdog over ideas, people and goods coming into the country. The internal and external growth and change of the building reflect these changes in use.

The place is important in demonstrating aesthetic characteristics and/or a high degree of creative or technical achievement in New South Wales.

The Custom's House embodies the work of three successive and individually distinguished official architects of New South Wales. Although Walter Liberty Vernon and James Barnet greatly altered the work of Mortimer Lewis, they did so using similar external materials and proportions so as to generate an overall unity of construction.

The place has a strong or special association with a particular community or cultural group in New South Wales for social, cultural or spiritual reasons.

The site has significance as the initial point of European invasion of the lands of Aboriginal people.

The place has potential to yield information that will contribute to an understanding of the cultural or natural history of New South Wales.

Because of the scarcity of documentary evidence about the early stages of construction, the surviving building fabric from these stages constitutes the principal source of additional evidence about the early history of the building and its occupants.

The place possesses uncommon, rare or endangered aspects of the cultural or natural history of New South Wales.

This site has been ranked as extremely significant in its unique reflection of the commercial expansion of the colony and the nationally significant role of the Customs Service. This is especially true for the early phases of the building's evolution.

== See also ==
- Australian non-residential architectural styles
