= Vince Hughes =

Australian rugby league footballer

Personal information
- Full name: Vincent Thomas Hughes
- Born: 13 July 1906 Waterloo, New South Wales, Australia
- Died: 9 September 1989 (aged 83) Sylvania, New South Wales, Australia

Playing information
- Position: Centre, Five-eighth, Wing
Club
Years	Team	Pld	T	G	FG	P
1926–29	Newtown	42	5	0	0	15
1930–31	Western Suburbs	3	1	0	0	3
	Total	45	6	0	0	18
Representative
Years	Team	Pld	T	G	FG	P
1928	NSW City	1	0	0	0	0
1927	Metropolis	1	0	0	0	0

Vince Hughes (1906-1989) was an Australian rugby league footballer who played in the 1920s and 1930s. He played for Newtown and Western Suburbs in the New South Wales Rugby League (NSWRL) competition.

== Playing career ==
Hughes was a member of the South Sydney Presidents Cup side of 1923. He played at Lithgow, New South Wales in 1925 and joined Newtown the following season. Hughes made his first grade debut for Newtown in Round 1 1926 against University at Wentworth Park. Over the coming seasons, Hughes established himself in the first grade side and switched between centre and five-eighth positions. In 1928, Newtown finished last on the table claiming the wooden spoon after only winning 1 match all season. Hughes was selected to play for NSW City in 1928 despite Newtown's poor form in the premiership.

In 1929, Newtown had a complete form reversal and finished 4th on the table. The club then went on to upset St George 8-7 at Earl Park, Arncliffe in the semi-final to reach the 1929 NSWRL grand final. In the grand final, the club's opponents were the all conquering South Sydney side who were looking to win their 5th premiership in a row. Hughes played at five-eighth in the final as Newtown never troubled Souths losing 30-10 at the Sydney Sports Ground in front of 16,360 fans.

In 1930, Hughes joined Western Suburbs and was part of the side which claimed the minor premiership. Hughes played in the semi-final victory over Souths but missed out playing in the club's grand final win over St George. The following season in 1931, Hughes made 1 final appearance for the club which was against North Sydney at Pratten Park in a 19-16 loss.
