= Frank Easton =

Australian cricketer

Personal information
- Born: 19 February 1910; Waterloo, New South Wales, Australia
- Died: 5 May 1989 (aged 79); Sydney, Australia
- Source: ESPNcricinfo, 26 December 2016

Frank Easton (19 February 1910 – 5 May 1989) was an Australian cricketer. He played eighteen first-class matches for New South Wales between 1933/34 and 1938/39.

== See also ==
- List of New South Wales representative cricketers
