= Syd Price =

Australian rules footballer

Personal information
- Full name: Sydney Alexander Price
- Born: 16 July 1887; Waterloo, New South Wales
- Died: 24 July 1947 (aged 60); Fitzroy, Victoria
- Height: 171 cm (5 ft 7 in)
- Weight: 75 kg (165 lb)

Playing career^{1}
Years	Club	Games (Goals)
1909–10	Richmond	11 (7)
- ^{1} Playing statistics correct to the end of 1910.

Sydney Alexander Price (16 July 1887 – 24 July 1947) was an Australian rules footballer who played with Richmond in the Victorian Football League (VFL).
