= Gwyneth Dow =

Australian educator (1920–1996)

Gwyneth Dow (1920 – 1996) was an Australian educator, notable for her contributions to the Australian education system.

== Early life ==
Dow was born Gwyneth Maude Terry in Melbourne. She took her BA and a Diploma Education (DipEd) in 1957, completing a Master in Education in 1961 and a Doctor's in Education in 1984.

== Career ==
Dow worked as a personnel officer during World War II, and became one of the first industrial welfare officers employed in Melbourne industry.

Dow's academic career started as a lecturer in the education faculty at the University of Melbourne in 1958. She was a proponent of change in both the school curriculum and teacher education. A book based on her Master's thesis was published in 1964 and she wrote numerous papers on educational theory and pedagogy. Dow founded the Victorian Curriculum Advisory board and served on it from 1966 to 1970. One of her accomplishments was to introduce postgraduate Diploma of Education courses into the Australia's educational system, and to launch a course B that she had designed. This course placed students in schools 3 days a week, and was a noted concept at the time for giving teachers real experience through work placement.

Dow was an active unionist, a member of the Victorian Teachers' Union. As part of this, she pushed for achieving permanent status for married teachers who were working in schools.

== Personal life ==
She was briefly married to journalist Rohan Rivett, before marrying University of Melbourne academic Hume Dow in 1947.

In retirement she continued to work on interests including Tasmanian and family history, including a biography of her great-great grandfather, Samuel Terry. She continued to publish books, in some cases collaborating with her husband.
