= William Hutchinson (superintendent) =

British convict, public servant and businessman (1772–1846)

- Born: 1772
- Died: 1846 (aged 73–74)

William Hutchinson (1772 – 26 July 1846) was a British convict who was transported to the Australian colonies, ultimately to become a successful public servant and businessman.

Hutchinson was by trade a butcher in England. In June 1796, Hutchinson was convicted at the Old Bailey of stealing £ 40 worth of goods, and was sentenced to death, though this was later commuted to transportation for seven years. After spending three years in London on board the prison hulk Newgate, Hutchinson was transported to Australia on the Hillsborough, sometimes referred to as the "Fever Ship" since some ninety-five of the three hundred convicts aboard died from typhoid fever brought aboard from the prison hulks. Reaching Sydney in 1799, Hutchinson was again convicted of theft after stealing from the government stores in Sydney, and was transported to the penal settlement on Norfolk Island.

Hutchinson soon gained employ in the administration of the settlement, becoming an overseer of government livestock. In June 1801, he married his first wife Mary Cooper (also known as Mary Chapman), a convict who had been transported from Surrey, arriving on Norfolk Island in 1798; together they would have eight children, six of them born on Norfolk Island. In June 1803 he was appointed an acting superintendent of convicts on the island, and in 1805 he officially became an emancipist. By 1809 he was made a superintendent proper. Hutchinson acquired significant land holdings on the island, and did a handsome trade selling pork to the government.

After 1803, there was a push for the settlement on Norfolk Island to be disbanded, mainly on the part of the then Secretary of State for War and the Colonies Lord Hobart; the military presence there was ultimately withdrawn in 1813, and Hutchinson, along with the boat-builder Thomas Ransom, was among the last of the settlers to leave the island in February 1814.

Most of the Norfolk settlers were relocated to the recently founded Hobart Town, in the colony of Tasmania. However, Hutchinson had been recommended to the Governor of New South Wales, Lachlan Macquarie, by the former Lieutenant-Governor of Norfolk Island, Joseph Foveaux, and so Hutchinson instead returned to Sydney, where Macquarie appointed him the superintendent of convicts and public works, to succeed Isaac Nichols from April 1814. Hutchinson gained much influence in this position, however after John Bigge's reports into the transportation system in the Australian colonies, Hutchinson was replaced as superintendent by Frederick Hely in 1823. Hutchinson was to have been appointed chief wharfinger in Sydney in 1817, though this appointment was never formally recognised by the British authorities.

Hutchinson's eighth child with his first wife Mary was born in 1817; Mary is thought to have returned to England in March 1819, and there was no record of her after that. On 21 June 1825 Hutchinson married his second wife, Jane Roberts, who was also a former convict (having been transported for seven years, arriving in 1803) and who was the widow of another former convict turned businessman. Though the marriage only lasted a short time, two of Jane's sons from her first marriage married two of Hutchinson's daughters from his first marriage.

Hutchinson became a significant businessman in Sydney, forming business partnerships with Edward Eagar, William Redfern and Samuel Terry, among others; he also had extensive land holdings in Sydney, its suburbs and the surrounding towns, and also in Melbourne. His more rural holdings made him a successful pastoralist. He had participated in the 1816 founding of the Bank of New South Wales, and was a director of the bank from January 1829 onwards. In 1835, he was elected to the board of directors of both the Marine Insurance Co and the Australian Wheat and Flour Co, and participated in the formation of the Australian Patriotic Association, and in 1840 he was one of the original directors of the Mutual Fire Insurance Association.

At his death, Hutchinson left goods worth £20,000; together with his land holdings, his estate was worth £220,000, or about A$1.77 billion in 2004 value. On this valuation, in 2004 William Rubinstein placed Hutchinson at 147th on his list of the two hundred richest Australians of all time.

== Flour Business ==
William Hutchinson, Samuel Terry, Thomas White Melville Winder, George Williams, William Leverton and Daniel Cooper went into flour mill operating partnership. The Mill was renamed the Lachlan and Waterloo Flour Mills. The partnership traded as Hutchinson, Terry & Co. It had previously been established in August 1820 on Samuel Terry’s land in Kensington and in a partnership with Samuel Terry and Thomas White Melville Winder. Hutchinson sold out in 1825.

In 1835 he was elected a director of the Marine Insurance Co. and the Australian Wheat and Flour Co.
