= Samuel Terry =

Australian landowner (1776–1838)

- Born: 1776; England
- Died: 22 February 1838 (aged 61–62)

Samuel Terry (c. 1776 – 22 February 1838) was an English man who was transported to Australia as a criminal, where he became a wealthy landowner, merchant and philanthropist. His extreme wealth made him by far the richest man in the colony with wealth comparable to the richer people in England. Terry left a personal estate valued at £250,000, an income of over £10,000 a year from Sydney rentals, and landed property that defies assessment. At his death in 1838 he was worth 3.39% of the colony's gross domestic product, which today would be equivalent to over $24 billion.

== Early life ==
The year and circumstances of Terry's birth are unknown. While working as a labourer in Manchester, England, on 22 January 1800 he was sentenced to transportation to the colony of Australia for the crime of stealing 400 pairs of stockings. He was taken to Sydney, Australia, where he served as a stone cutter. After working several jobs, he earned a farm in 1808.

On 27 March 1810 Terry married Rosetta (Rosata) Marsh or Madden, née Pracey, who had come freely to the colony in 1799 on the East India Company ship Hillsborough. She was a widow (possibly of convict Edward Madden, and later of Henry Marsh), and she had three children when she married. She was an innkeeper, and upon their marriage Terry took over her Pitt Street property. He continued to prosper, becoming a trader and a supplier of food to the government.

By 1820 he possessed significant amounts of property and was a large shareholder in the Bank of New South Wales. There is some controversy about the means he used to acquire his wealth, and he was accused of extortion by his enemies. It was alleged that he brought landowners to his inn, who would become intoxicated and sign away their property in payment of debts. By 1821 he had also brought 28 actions to the Supreme Court.

In the 1820s he was a wealthy public figure. He was also a philanthropist, contributing to local societies and schools. He worked for the emancipists and, in 1826, became president of the local Masonic Lodge. He died on 22 February 1838 following three years incapacitated as a result of a seizure.

== Flour business ==
In August 1820 Terry entered into a business partnership with Thomas White Melville Winder to mill grain into flour. The mills were built on a grant of land belonging to Terry in what is known today as Kensington. Later this partnership was expanded into a board of six, adding William Hutchinson, George Williams, William Leverton, and Daniel Cooper. The Mill was renamed the Lachlan and Waterloo Flour Mills, though the partnership actually traded as Hutchinson, Terry & Co.

== Death & probate ==
Terry had a paralytic seizure and died three years later on 22 February 1838. His burial was with Masonic honours. The band of the 50th Regiment led the procession.

Probate of the will and executor was granted to Rosetta Terry, Tom White Melville Winder, and James Norton. The personal estate he left was estimated at £250,000. Income from the estate was estimated as being over £10,000 a year from Sydney rentals.

The Samuel Terry Public School in Cranebrook is named in his honor.

In 1967 Terry's biography, written by his great-granddaughter Gwyneth Dow, was included in The Australian Dictionary of Biography.

== See also ==
- List of convicts transported to Australia
