= Cup and saucer =

Cup and saucer may refer to:

- Cup and Saucer Creek, a storm drain located in Sydney, New South Wales, Australia
- Cup and Saucer, the high point of Manitoulin Island, in Lake Huron, Ontario, Canada
- Cup-and-saucer plant (Holmskioldia sanguinea), a plant species
- Cup-and-saucer snail (Calyptraeidae)
- Cup and Saucer Stakes, a Canadian Thoroughbred horse race held annually in October at Woodbine Racetrack in Toronto, Ontario
- Cup and Saucer (string figure)
- Cup-and-saucer vine (Cobaea scandens), a perennial ornamental plant species native of Tropical America
- Cups and Saucers, a one-act "satirical musical sketch" written and composed by George Grossmith
- a pattern in stock market prediction
- Cup and saucer drama, developed in Britain by T. W. Robertson
