= Alexandra Canal (New South Wales) =

Alexandra Canal Shea's Creek
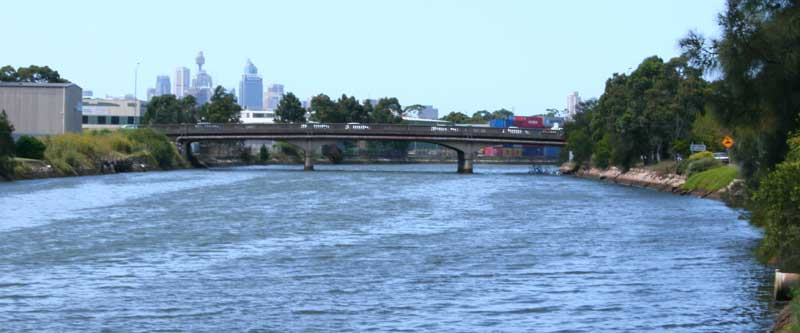
- Alexandra Canal, looking upstream towards the Sydney CBD

- Location of the mouth in Greater Sydney
- Etymology: In honour of Princess Alexandra

Location
- Country: Australia
- State: New South Wales
- Local government areas: City of Sydney; Inner West Council; Bayside Council

Physical characteristics
- Source: Sydney Park
  - location: Alexandria
  - coordinates: 33°54′37″S 151°11′29″E
  - elevation: 1.5 metres (4 ft 11 in) AHD
- Mouth: Cooks River
  - location: Tempe
  - coordinates: 33°55′59″S 151°9′43″E
  - elevation: 0.5 metres (1 ft 8 in) AHD
- Length: 4.5 kilometres (2.8 mi)
- Width
  - average: 60 metres (200 ft)
  - maximum: 80 metres (260 ft)

Basin features
- River system: Cooks River
- Bridges: Shell pipeline bridge; Sydenham to Botany railway line; Canal Road Bridge; A small footbridge

New South Wales Heritage Register
- Type: Built
- Criteria: a., c., d., e., f., g.
- Designated: 15 November 2002
- Reference no.: 01621

The Alexandra Canal, a tributary of the Cooks River, is a heritage-listed artificial waterway in southern Sydney, New South Wales, Australia. Alexandra Canal was named after Princess Alexandra, who married Edward, Prince of Wales (later King Edward VII) in 1863.

The canal is Sydney's first inbound waterway. It stretches 4 kilometres (2.5 mi) from the inner Sydney suburb of Alexandria, flowing through the suburbs of St Peters and Mascot, past Sydney's Sydney Airport to the Cooks River at Tempe, which eventually discharges into Botany Bay. The canal is 60 metres (200 ft) wide, increasing to 80 metres (260 ft) at its mouth. and is one of only two navigable canals constructed in New South Wales.

== History ==
Alexandra Canal was once a salt marsh known as Shea's Creek. Sheas Creek is a tributary of the Cooks River which begins in the once sandy hills of the present Surry Hills east of Redfern.

Early industry used Shea's Creek for drainage and complaints by the public were often aired to the government with requests for a solution. Dredging commenced in 1887 to adapt Sheas Creek to a canal, with the intention of creating manufacturing and industrial opportunities in the area by offering shipping as a means of transporting cargo. The canal was intended to be the "Birmingham of Australia" and was constructed under an unemployed work relief scheme.

The canal was originally lined with a fascine dyke as were sections of the Cooks River. The original canal started to the south-west of the existing Metropolitan Goods railway line bridge and extended to the Canal Road Bridge. In 1894 the canal was to be extended to Buckland Street, Redfern, however only part of this section was ever constructed, the limit of the canal was to the south of Huntley Street, Alexandria. Construction of Alexandra Canal provided employment for workers during the 1890s depression.

During the excavation of Shea's Creek in 1896, the remains of a dugong were found in the estuarine clay. Examination by the then curator of the Australian Museum, Robert Etheridge, revealed the animal had been butchered by a blunt-edged cutting or chopping instrument. Two stone hatchet heads were found nearby. The artifacts provide evidence of the Indigenous Australians who lived in the area prior to European settlement. As sections of the canal were completed, wharves were constructed along the canal to encourage its use.

The canal, as originally planned, was substantially completed in 1900. Major changes to the canal occurred when the airport was expanded over three phases from 1947 to 1970. These changes included altering the course of the canal near its junction with the Cooks River. The canal was never considered a success, its use limited by the shallow draught of the vessels that could use it, constant silting, tidal factors and the advent of commercial road transport in the 1930s. This change became permanent when the two lifting span bridges that crossed the Canal were altered to become fixed in the 1930s. By the early 1940s the navigational use of the canal declined to such an extent that it was decided not to maintain the wharves and they were demolished.

During World War II, 250 wool sheds were constructed along the eastern side of the canal, built as temporary storage for the large amounts of wool stockpiled during the war. Some of these sheds still exist today.

In the 19th and 20th centuries, the canal became highly polluted by runoff from nearby industries, with the canal's sediment contaminated with heavy metals. In 1998, Sydney Water launched a A$4 million plan to clean and restore the condition of the canal's water, but this plan has since been abandoned. Five tributaries flow into the canal.

In 1999, the Southern Cross Cable was constructed underneath the canal in Alexandria, where it leads to the sea via Botany Bay – Commissioned in 2000, this cable carries a significant portion of Australia's internet traffic to North America.

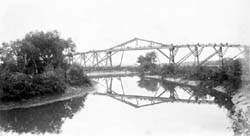
Pipeline over Shea's Creek, 1886. Image:Macleay Museum

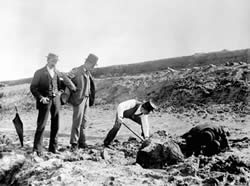
Excavation of dugong remains at Shea's Creek in 1896, during construction of the Alexandra Canal. The curator of the Australian Museum, Robert Etheridge, stands centre wearing a top hat. Image: Australian Museum archives

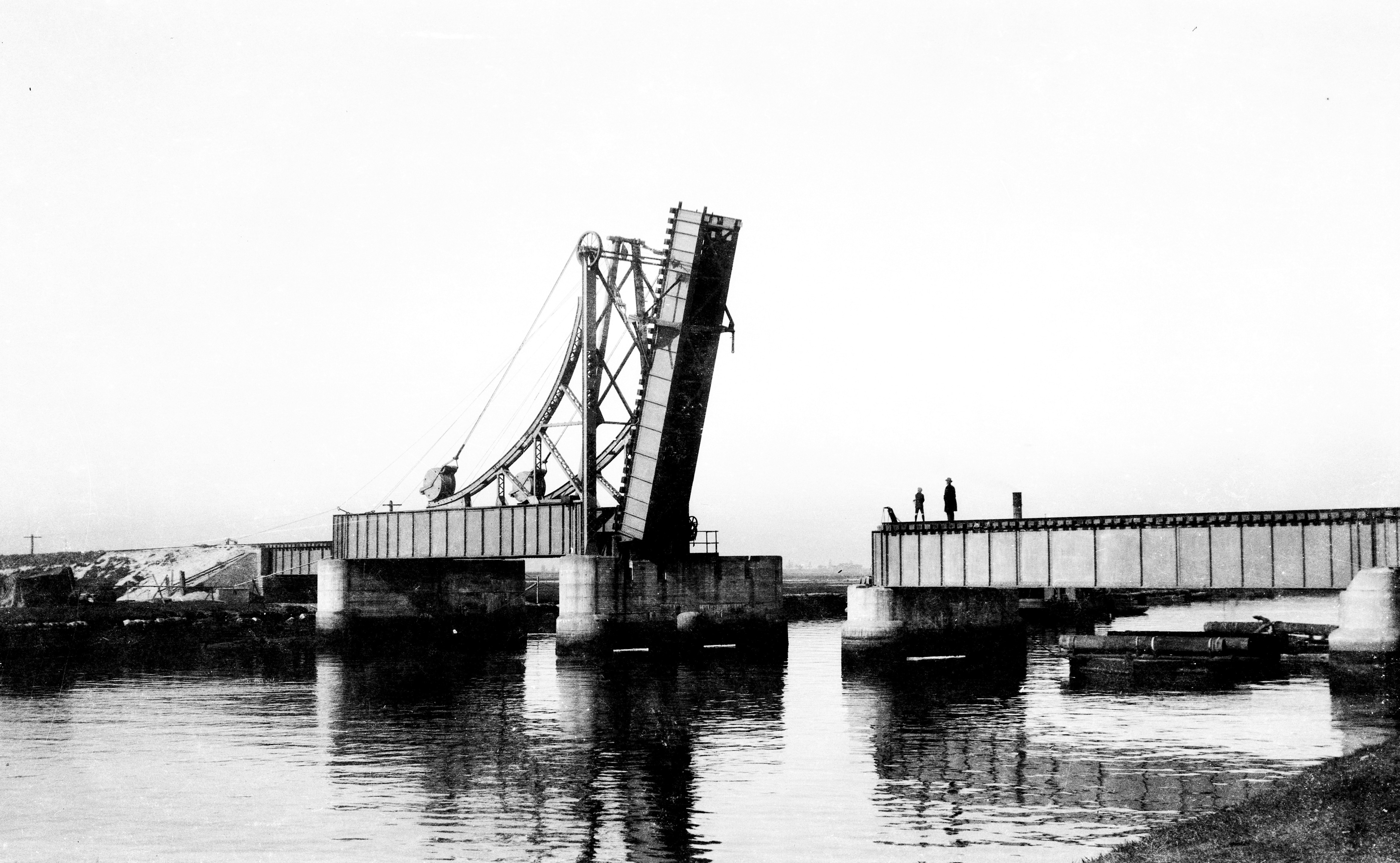
Lifting railway bridge over Alexandra canal (1925). The bridge shown has since been replaced with a fixed span bridge.

== Redevelopment proposal ==
In June 1998, the then New South Wales Minister for Urban Affairs and Planning, Craig Knowles, announced that architecture students from the University of New South Wales would be commissioned to create designs that would transform Alexandra Canal into a "stunning water and green recreation corridor between Sydney Harbour and Botany Bay". The students were given an A$5000 grant, funded by the South Sydney Development Corporation, an authority owned by the Government of New South Wales to oversee the redevelopment of the Green Square precinct. Nine of the students' designs were put on public exhibition in August that year.

By August 1999, a $300 million plan was announced by the South Sydney Development Corporation, that would feature housing for 25,000 residents, cafes, restaurants and boating facilities on the Alexandra Canal. The masterplan, released in 2001, featured cycleways along the entire length of both banks of the canal. In February, 2003, the New South Wales Deputy Premier, Dr Andrew Refshauge submitted the development application to begin construction of the cycleway. "The creation of the cycle and pedestrian path along the length of the canal will draw people to the edge of the canal, providing opportunities for picnics, walking and cycling", said Refshauge.

In 2003 the Department of Environment and Climate Change declared it was too dangerous to disturb the canal and plans for redevelopment have been put aside.

== Description ==
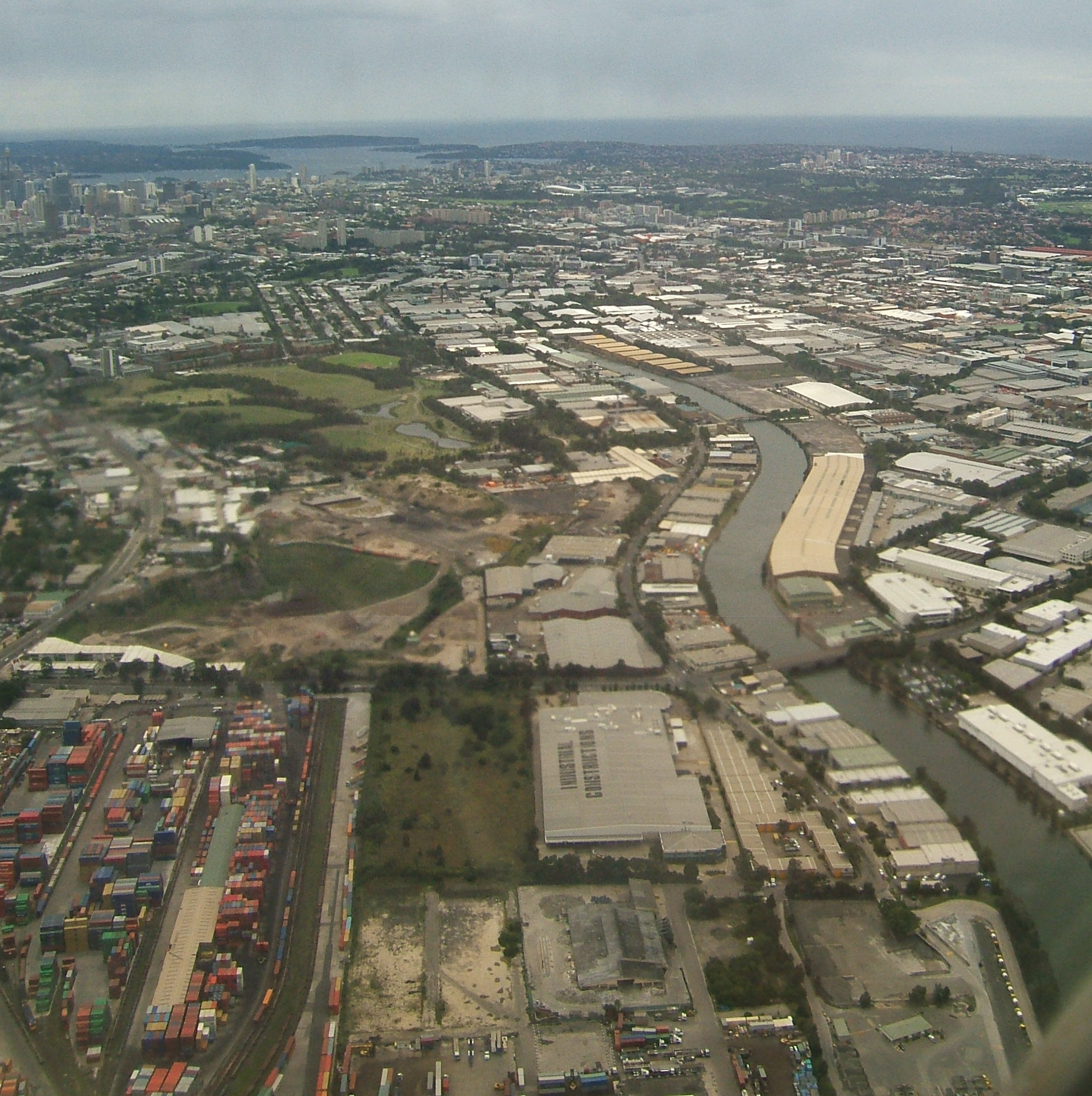
The Alexandra Canal in 2010

Alexandra Canal is an adapted artificial waterway (formerly known as Sheas Creek) which stretches 4.5 km from its southern point at Cooks River to the north near Huntley Street, Alexandria. Its banks are formed by pitching comprising sloping dry sandstone capped with a sandstone caping.

It extends from approximately 0.5 metres below low water mark to approximately 1.5 metres above high water mark. It is spanned by 4 bridges: Shell pipeline bridge, Sydenham to Botany Railway line, Canal Road Bridge and a small footbridge.

The head of the Canal connects to the Sheas Creek Stormwater Channel, located off Maddox Street in Alexandria, leading under Huntley Street and entering Alexandra Canal.

The eastern side of the Canal north of Coward Street is occupied by a series of former mid-twentieth-century woolstore buildings, now used for a variety of purposes (though some are derelict), which are recognised as heritage buildings.

The course of the canal, at the southern end near the Cooks River, has been altered due to airport expansion. Sections of the stonework south of the railway bridge near the Tempe Reserve have been removed while the remainder is substantially intact.

== Heritage listing ==
Alexandra Canal is of high historic, aesthetic and technical/research significance. Historically, it is a rare example of 19th century navigational canal construction in Australia, being one of only two purpose built canals in the State, with one other known example in Victoria. It has the ability to demonstrate the NSW Governments initiative to create water transport as a means of developing an industrial complex in the Alexandria and Botany areas and exploiting the use of unemployed labour to achieve its scheme.

It played a seminal role in the changing pattern and evolution of the occupation and industrial uses of the local area and nearby suburbs, which included filling large areas of low-lying land for development.

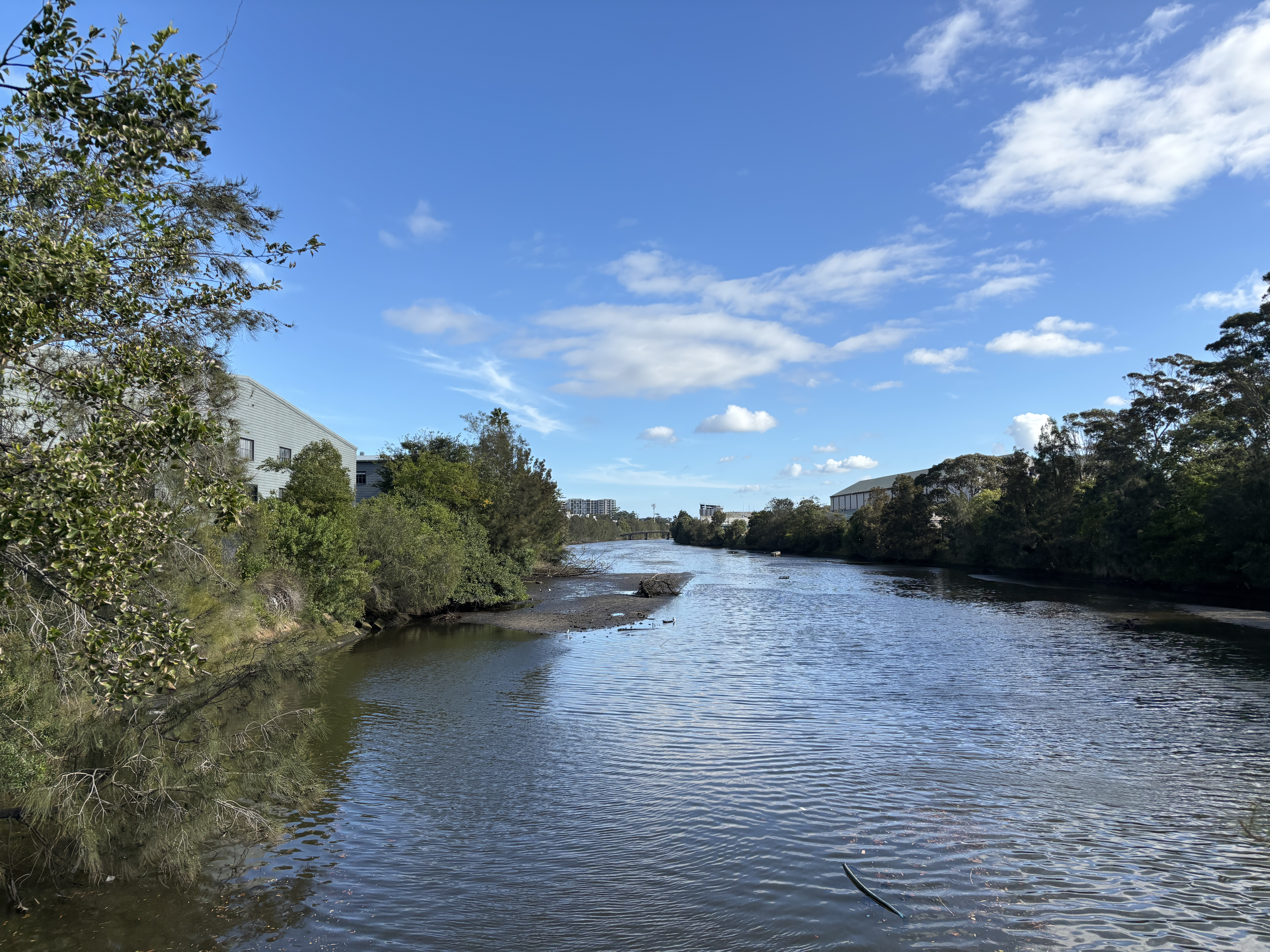
The northern end of the canal in 2025

Aesthetically, intact original sections of the canal, comprising pitched dry packed ashlar sandstone, provides a textured and coloured finish which is aesthetically valuable in the cultural landscape. It is a major landmark and dramatic component of the industrial landscape of the area, particularly as viewed from the Ricketty Street Bridge and along Airport Drive.

Scientifically, the excavation of the canal provided a valuable contribution to the understanding of the changing sea-levels along the eastern seaboard and the antiquity of the aboriginal presence in the area. Intact original sections of the fascine dyke sandstone construction are rare examples of late 19th century coastal engineering works.

The area has been assessed as having no potential to contain historical archaeological material associated with the development or occupation of the area, either prior to or since the construction of the canal. As a result, the study area would contain no material of historical significance, or material that could contribute to the significance of Alexandra Canal itself.

Alexandra Canal was listed on the New South Wales State Heritage Register on 15 November 2002 having satisfied the following criteria.

The place is important in demonstrating the course, or pattern, of cultural or natural history in New South Wales.

Alexandra Canal was built during the 1890s depression using unemployed labour. It is one of two navigational canals built in NSW and is the only canal built to provide access for water transport for the delivery of cargo in NSW. The canal, the warehouses and factories around it, the bridges that cross it and the remains of the wharves are evidence of attempts by the government to encourage development in the area.

The place is important in demonstrating aesthetic characteristics and/or a high degree of creative or technical achievement in New South Wales.

Sections of the canal exhibit relatively intact sections of ashlar stonework. This is an example of late 19th century coastal engineering work that was done to the canal. The canal is a large visual landmark in the area, and can be viewed from the Ricketty Street Bridge.

The place has potential to yield information that will contribute to an understanding of the cultural or natural history of New South Wales.

The discovery of butchered Dugong bones, aboriginal axes and the remains of an ancient forest in this area, all of which were found beneath the then low water mark during the excavation of the canal, were the subject of an academic paper. This paper contributed to the scientific understanding of the changing sea-levels along the eastern seaboard and the antiquity of the aboriginal presence in the area. The Canal exemplifies and is rare tangible evidence of Government initiatives of canal transportation and implementation of pre 20th century unemployment relief schemes.

The place possesses uncommon, rare or endangered aspects of the cultural or natural history of New South Wales.

Alexandra Canal is one of two extant navigational canals in NSW and one of the few built in Australia in the 19th and 20th century. It was the only purpose built canal constructed to provide navigational access in industrial areas in NSW.

The place is important in demonstrating the principal characteristics of a class of cultural or natural places/environments in New South Wales.

Alexandra Canal is a representative example of a late nineteenth century coastal navigational canal.

== See also ==
- Canals in Australia
