= Timber Slab Cottage, Tempe =

Timber Slab Cottage
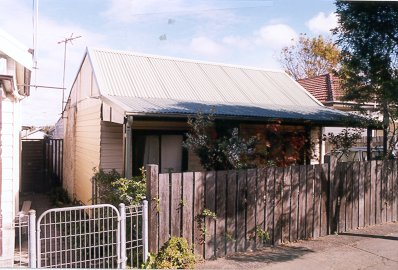
- The original cottage has been covered in modern aluminium weatherboards

- Location within Sydney Location within Australia
- 33.9247°S 151.1625°E
- Location: 44 Barden Street, Tempe, Inner West Council, Sydney, New South Wales, Australia

History
- Built: 1840–1850

New South Wales Heritage Register
- Official name: Timber Slab Cottage; Dwelling; Dover
- Type: state heritage (built)
- Designated: 29 September 2000
- Reference no.: 1412
- Type: Cottage
- Category: Residential buildings (private)

Timber Slab Cottage is a heritage-listed residence at 44 Barden Street, Tempe, Inner West Council, Sydney, New South Wales, Australia. It was built from 1840 to 1850. It is also known as Dover. It was added to the New South Wales State Heritage Register on 29 September 2000.

== History ==
Based on an analysis of the building fabric and the existing land title information, it is considered it was constructed around 1840 and would have been a worker's cottage on land owned by Alexander Brodie Spark, the man who built Tempe House in the 1830s.

The first registered land grant for the site was 470 acres (190 ha). It was made in October 1799 to Thomas Smythe, provost marshal by Gov. Hunter Oct 1799. Smythe died in 1804 and the land eventually passed to his senior, John Palmer. John Palmer (Commissionary) sold it to his brother-in-law Robert Campbell in 1808.

Campbell held it for 27 years and sold 63 acres (25 ha) bordering Cooks River and O'Shea's Creek (the site of old Tempe Village) to Alexander Brodie Spark in 1835. In 1842 Spark surveyed both St Peters and Tempe village areas for their future sale. Sixty-three acres (25 ha) at Tempe were mortgaged to the Bank of Australia.

In 1850 156 allotments, part of the Village of Tempe (700 allotments) (Lot 43 block 2 is 44 Barden St) were sold to Edward Flood. In 1854 Edward Flood sold a lot, including lot 43 block 2, to Joseph Nobbs. In 1861 Joseph Nobbs sold 3 lots, including lot 43 to Frederick Barden. The street was later renamed from Campbell to Barden Street after Frederick.

== Description ==
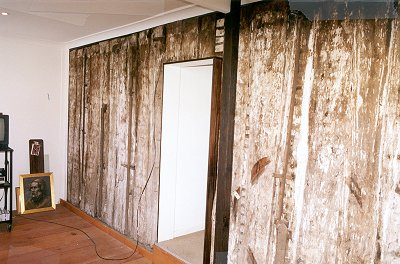
Interior wall showing original split timber vertical slabs

The building is a split timber slab cottage. Originally roofed with she-oak shingles, now roofed with corrugated steel roof sheeting. It is now clad with aluminum sheeting on walls, except for one rear wall in brick.

The front two rooms were the original slab cottage, with the remainder of the building having been added later.

It was reported as at 15 June 2000 that the underneath of the cottage retained some archaeological surface deposits that were relatively undisturbed.

At least two-thirds of original fabric of the original two room cottage remains. It shows aspects of original construction and is in relatively good condition.

=== Modifications and dates ===
1. Original Cottage constructed between 1840 and 1850
2. Brick wall (23 by 265 cm (0.75 by 8.69 ft)) extension part of workshop then kitchen post 1850
3. Main rear lean-to c. 1950s
4. Smaller kitchen and bathroom add c. 1960s
5. Bear Shed c. 1960s
6. Original cottage lined internally (gyprock) 1970s

== Heritage listing ==
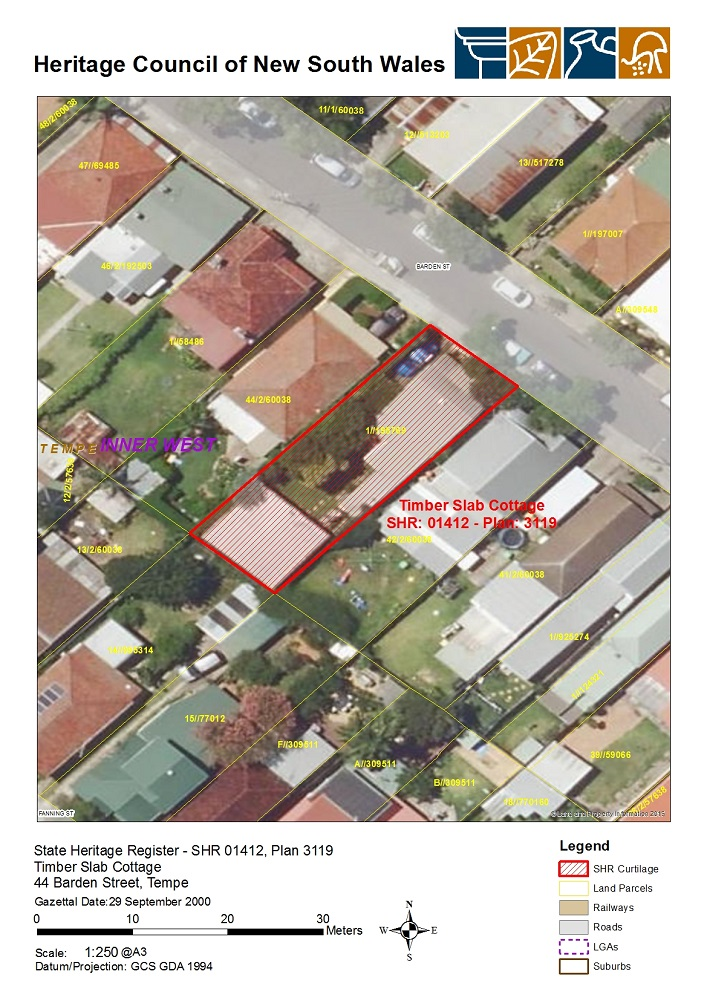
Heritage boundaries

The timber slab cottage at 44 Barden Street Tempe dates from the mid-19th century. It is a rare surviving example of the type of vernacular rudimentary timber building built in early Sydney. The house is one of the oldest houses in Tempe and is on land which was part of an original land grant dating back to 1799. It was constructed c. 1840, and would have been a worker's cottage on land owned by A.B. Spark, the man who built Tempe House in the mid-1830s.

The walls are made up of vertical timber slabs which have been split. The hardwood slabs have been crudely thinned at each end and are fixed with original "Ewbank" nails (produced from 1838 to 1870). The walls have been painted with multiple layers of limewash. The gaps between the timber slabs have been caulked with a lime putty made from slaked rock lime. The interior walls are timber lath and plaster. The floors are hardwood pit-sawn timber, with saw markings and square edge detailing fixed on round joists with the remnants of the original bark still preserved. The foundations are sandstone piers set into a sand clay footing.

Timber Slab Cottage was listed on the New South Wales State Heritage Register on 29 September 2000 having satisfied the following criteria.

The place is important in demonstrating the course, or pattern, of cultural or natural history in New South Wales.

Land Grants for the site go back to October 1799. The original grant of 470 acres (190 ha) was used for agricultural purposes farmed with assigned convicts. The land was also owned by Robert Campbell who built Tempe House across the river. He sold the land at about this time possibly to help pay for Tempe House. It is probably the oldest extant vernacular house in Tempe.

The place is important in demonstrating aesthetic characteristics and/or a high degree of creative or technical achievement in New South Wales.

Small cottage form evident from street. The original southern exterior wall is now part of the living room which is now internal. This wall is 6 m (20 ft) slab wall and 2.7 m (8 ft 10 in). The adjacent 19th century brick wall is also visible. The cottage is a rare example of a rudimentary timber slab cottage. Although the exterior is now encapsulated within modern aluminum weatherboard cladding it is visible on the inside wall of the living room.

The place has strong or special association with a particular community or cultural group in New South Wales for social, cultural or spiritual reasons.

It is significant because it shows an example of a small domestic house from early Sydney. It was constructed c.1840 and would have been a worker's cottage on land owned by A.B. Spark, the man who built Tempe House in the 1830s.

The house shows how older buildings are set on sites at a skew angle and do not always align with new sub-divisions. This provides evidence of an earlier occupation before sub division. It is one of the oldest house in the area and provides evidence of early land use.

Grooves in the rear wall show evidence of early steam driven machines. This may have been associated with the agricultural development or be part of some small industry manufacturing process.

The place has potential to yield information that will contribute to an understanding of the cultural or natural history of New South Wales.

Provides evidence of the technology of slab cottages in the middle of the 19th century. The house is raised of the ground and uses nails to fix the slabs which have been roughly thinned out to receive the "Ewbank" nails. The construction shows a reasonable understanding of carpentry techniques and uses mortise and tenon joints. Accommodation seems above normal for convict/ lessee/ or shepherd. More likely built for a supervisor or farm caretaker for owners.

The place possesses uncommon, rare or endangered aspects of the cultural or natural history of New South Wales.

This type of vertical timber slab construction is rare, particularly in the Sydney region. It is similar to Dundullimal Homestead, Dubbo. Normally slab buildings are built on the ground, this cottage is unusual in that it has a well ventilated floor space underneath it.

The place is important in demonstrating the principal characteristics of a class of cultural or natural places/environments in New South Wales.

No other building of this type in the area.
