= Nelson Lodge =

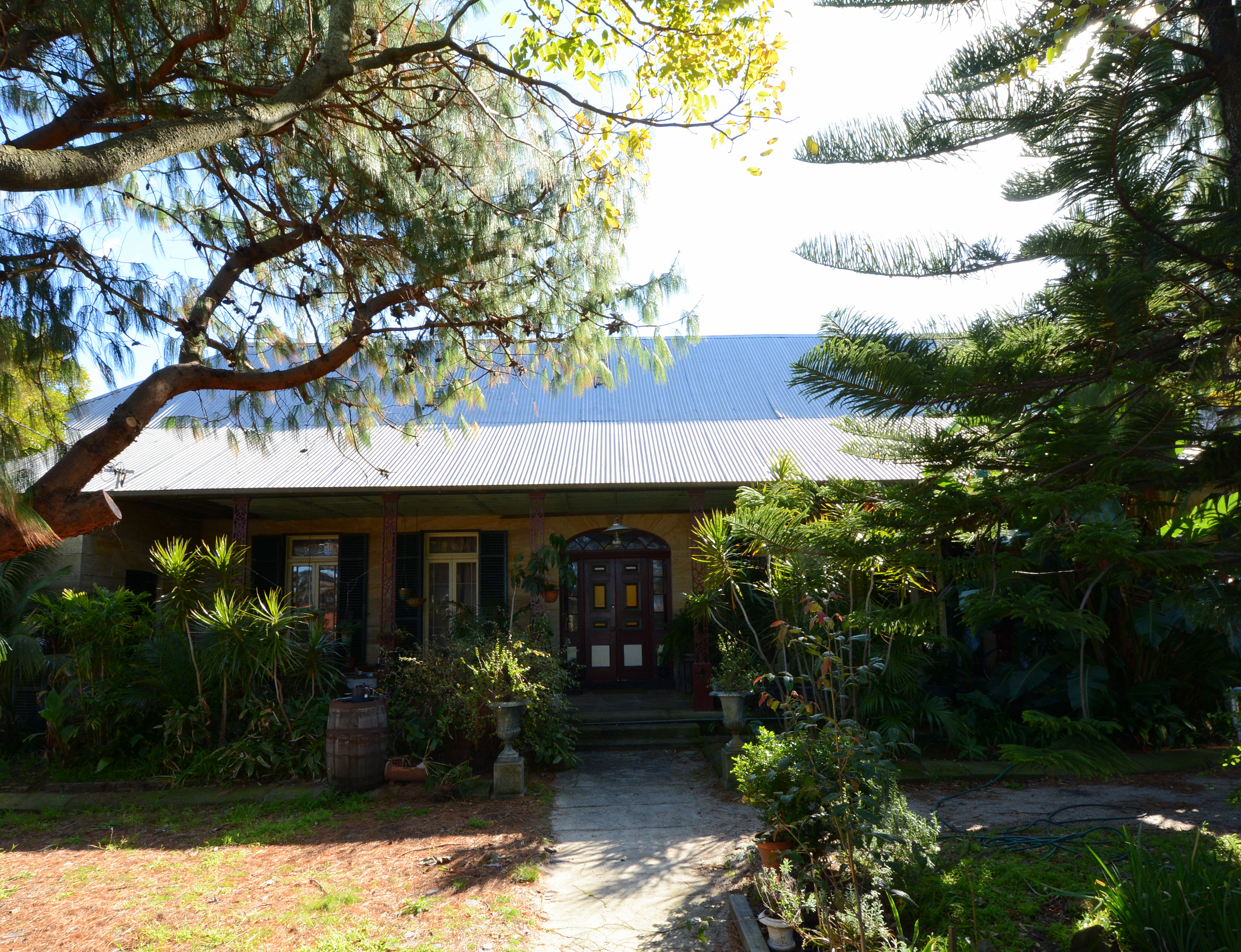

- Location within New South Wales Location within Australia
- 33.9212°S 151.1593°E
- Location: 125 Unwins Bridge Road, Tempe, New South Wales, Australia

History
- Built: 1858

New South Wales Heritage Register
- Official name: Milford Haven; Nelson Lodge; Leinster Hall
- Type: state heritage (built)
- Designated: 2 April 1999
- Reference no.: 518
- Type: Villa
- Category: Residential buildings (private)

Nelson Lodge is a heritage-listed residence at 125 Unwins Bridge Road, Tempe, New South Wales, Australia. It was built in 1858. It is also known as Milford Haven and Leinster Hall. It was added to the New South Wales State Heritage Register on 2 April 1999.

== History ==
=== Early land grants and farms ===
The earliest European occupant of the Cooks River was Sergeant Thomas Smyth who arrived with Governor Phillip in the First Fleet. On 8 October 1799 he was granted 470 acres and became the first large landowner in the southern section of the Marrickville area.

When Thomas Smyth died in 1804 his farm was acquired by Robert Campbell (senior) who between 1831 and 1838 carved up the property into 42 farmlets ranging from 4 to 12 acres. The Cooks River area was known for its market gardens, orchards and small farms and were an important part of the local economy from the mid-nineteenth century.

Robert Campbell sold the property to Henry Mace, a chemist on 30 December 1837. When Henry Mace died on 31 December 1856 Thomas Crittenden and William Perry became the trustees.

It was during the 1820s and 1830s that saw the beginning of change to the Tempe area. Alexander Brodie Spark, one of Sydney's leading merchants and traders purchased land known as Packer's Farm, Cooks River. He set about building Tempe House in 1836 designed by John Verge that was to become one of Sydney's showpiece estates at the time. In the 1840s Spark planned a model village in proximity to Tempe Estate and this no doubt would have been most attractive to prospective buyers.

On 13 May 1857 William Wells purchased the property at a public auction paying the sum of 331 pounds for the property measuring 10 acres and 6 perches (4.07ha).

William Wells was one of Sydney's new wealthy class. Born in Suffolk England in 1796 he was brought to trial in the Suffolk Lent Assizes Court on charges of Highway Robbery on 21 March 1816 and his sentence was committed to transportation to Australia. On 8 March 1817 Wells arrived in Sydney aboard the convict ship "Fame". In the 1822 Census it is revealed that he was living in Liverpool and working for the "Town Gang". On 28 April 1827 Wells was granted a Ticket of Leave within the District of Sydney however this was cancelled on 11 April 1828 when he was charged with 'being of Idle Character and found in an improper house at an unreasonable hour, when he was charged with robbing a man of his watch". Wells' Ticket of Leave was re-issued as a Ticket of Redemption on 2 January 1832.

Having been granted a Ticket of leave Wells was a free man to pursue an independent occupation. On 1 July 1830 Wells purchased a Hotel License for the Kings Rams in George Street, Parramatta and held that license until 1836.

Wells was confirmed a government land grant on 14 May 1836 for the site of the Lord Nelson Hotel in The Rocks. On this land Wells built himself a conventional 2 storey colonial home on the north-west corner of Kent and Argyle Streets. In 1838 Wells took up the licence of a hotel diagonally opposite his own house, known first as Sailors Return and then as The Quarryman's Arms. On 6 June 1842 Wells opened his own home as the Lord Nelson Hotel. Wells licensed the Lord Nelson from 1842 until 1860 and it remained in the Wells family until 1884.

=== Nelson Lodge ===
There is nothing to conclusively date the construction of the building, although it can be safely assumed that it was built for Wells around 1858. By 1861 Wells was living at Nelson Lodge and in 1862 Wells is listed as having a "Nursery" there. While there is nothing conclusive that establishes Wells' reason for building Nelson Lodge it is possible that he was considering retiring as a "country gentleman". Tempe, otherwise known as the Cooks River was well placed for such an ambition being the rural outpost and having gentrified neighbours. In 1858 Wells would have been 62 years of age and still had quite a young family, the eldest being 22 and the youngest was only 7. Given that Nelson Lodge was listed in the Sands Directory as a "Nursery" it was possible that Wells was attempting to practice as a commercial farmer. In the same year he had also taken up a Hotel Licence for the Wynyard Hotel. Perhaps then Wells had already gauged that there was little money to be made in farming or that retirement to the country suited neither himself or his family. In any case his sojourn to the country was brief as William Wells died on 9 August 1865 at Clarence Street, Sydney of "chronic disease of the brain." He was buried in the Camperdown Cemetery, adjacent to St Stephen's Anglican Church. The property then became the property of Ann Wells and her children.

From c. 1873 to c. 1878 Edward Greville, member of the New South Wales Legislative Assembly for Braidwood owned Nelson Lodge. He was never a local resident of Braidwood and during his term in office lived for some time at Nelson Lodge. Greville's platform was support for the working class and the development of natural resources. This supported his own interests as he owned a 2000-acre coalfield at Teralba near Newcastle. Greville was later a member of the Legislative Council from 20 April until 9 July 1903.

From 1878 to 1882 Catherine Birrell owned Nelson Lodge and was a widower at the time of purchasing the property. She purchased the property for the sum of 2400 pounds. It seems that it was Mrs Birrell who was responsible for the change of name from Nelson Lodge to Leinster Hall. Mrs Birrell died in 1882 aged 45 and the property was transferred to her son Francis Birrell and Teresa Birrell.

It appears that from 1882 to 1889 the owners Francis Birrell and Teresa Birrell did not live in the property but chose to rent it out. In 1886 4 perches (0.01 ha) was transferred to Public Works for the construction of Railway Street (now known as Collins Street).

From 1886 to 1888 Edward Grant Ward JP owned Nelson Lodge. Ward was Registrar General and Chairman of the Lands Titles Commissioners NSW from 1870 and an Honorary Fellow of the Statistical Society of London.

The Rev. Arthur Aspinall and his family owned Nelson Lodge from 1889 to 1925. In 1893 Aspinall was appointed the first principal of Scots College (Bellevue Hill) assuming full financial responsibility for and control over its affairs. Aspinall retired as principal of the school in 1913.

Rev. Aspinall was responsible for the subdivision of the larger estate of Nelson Lodge into suburban allotments. A Deposited Plan dated 1923 shows the subdivision with Nelson Lodge occupying Lot 5 also known as "e" measuring .032 acres or 0.18 ha. It would seem probable that outhouses were demolished during the 1923-25 subdivision as they would have occupied allotments 17 and 18.

Arthur and Helen Aspinall's daughter Jessie Strahorn (Aspinall) Freeman studied medicine at the University of Sydney as did their sons. In 1906 Jessie Aspinall was appointed the first female junior medical resident officer at Royal Prince Alfred Hospital which resulted in considerable furore by the board. Rev. Aspinall wrote a letter to the Sydney Morning Herald published on 9 February 1906 criticising the Board's decision to refuse to confirm his daughter's appointment. This resulted in considerable public protest and the Board agreed to appoint Dr Aspinall for one year. She continued her career in medicine at the Royal Hobart Hospital, at Crown Street Women's Hospital and her own practice at Lyon's Terrace and sometime school doctor for Scots College. She became a legend in the medical world at a time when female practitioners were uncommon.

The property title for "Lot e" also known as Lot 5 was transferred to Charles Willie Willis in April 1925. Willis was a builder and converted the residence into flats and converted the kitchen outhouse into a residence for his family. Other alterations included removing the original stone kitchen fireplace and a new wall constructed dividing the kitchen into two, new ceilings constructed throughout of pressed metal and plaster, one window converted into a doorway, new doorway giving direct access to the outside via a staircase.

Elizabeth Grace owned Nelson Lodge from December 1950 to July 1961 and it is possible that during this time the name of Nelson Lodge changed to Milford Haven.

Vito Modesto owned the property from July 1961 to September 1985.

Following a nomination by the owner Mr Geoffrey Croft in 1986 a Permanent Conservation Order was placed over Nelson Lodge on 7 August 1987. It was transferred to the State Heritage Register on 2 April 1999.

The property operated as a bed-and-breakfast accommodation for many years from 1988.

== Description ==
Nelson Lodge is an archetypal single-storey colonial Georgian-style bungalow, five bays wide. It follows the standard Colonial Georgian plan: a central hall, with rooms of equal size on either side with wide french doors which extend the living space onto the verandahs. It has 7 bedrooms, 6 bathrooms and a basement.

It exhibits typical features of the period including the broken-back roof, panelled french doors, fanlight windows, windows with large panes of glass and spreading verandah forms where cast iron columns form colonnades.

Nelson Lodge is constructed of ashlar sandstone and fine-pointed drafted margins. The front and back verandah floors are of sawn stone flags.

The front and back doors are identical four panel doors with fanlight and sidelights. The house has elegant double-hung sash windows. All joinery is constructed of Australian cedar.

The house also has marble fireplaces, extensive decorative plasterwork and ceiling enrichments, and open grille columns on front and back verandahs cast by the Victoria Foundry of Bubb and Son. The cast iron columns are identical to those used at Admiralty House, Sydney.

The roof is clad with corrugated metal sheeting, and although having numerous unsympathetic alterations the building still retains much of its original detailing.

The house is located on a 1556 square meter block. There are several mature trees to the street boundary which obscure views. The front garden is a cottage garden which is overgrown in some places. Mature trees include Mexican pine (Pinus patula). An historic photo shows clearly the front facade "framed" by a Cook's pine (Araucaria columnaris) and a Norfolk Island pine (Araucaria heterophylla).

=== Modifications and dates ===
- 1831-8 - 470 acres subdivided into farmlets
- c. 1858 - house constructed and nursery / farmlet estate use
- 1923 - subdivision to 0.18ha
- 1925 - converted into flats, kitchen outhouse into a residence. Other alterations included removing the original stone kitchen fireplace and a new wall dividing the kitchen into two, new ceilings throughout of pressed metal and plaster, one window converted into a doorway, new doorway giving direct access to the outside via a staircase.
- 1997 - approval for removal of accretions and intrusive elements from facade
- 1999 - approval to convert four apartments to single dwelling
- unknown date - Original slate roof replaced with corrugated steel sheeting.

Although having numerous unsympathetic alterations the building still retains much of its original detailing.

== Heritage listing ==
Nelson Lodge is an archetypal single-storey colonial Georgian-style bungalow constructed c. 1858. It was built as Nelson Lodge for William Wells, licensee of the Lord Nelson Hotel, Millers Point.

Nelson Lodge is an important and rare survivor of the second period of villa construction in Sydney which occurred after subdivision of the original land grants. Marrickville Municipality was the most significant location of early agriculture in inner Sydney and evidence of villa estates from this period is extremely rare.

Nelson Lodge was built for William Wells and Ann (Fogarty) Wells, former convicts, publicans and owners of the Lord Nelson Hotel, the oldest surviving hotel in Sydney. Nelson Lodge was built as a symbol of the Wells' financial success and their taste and attitudes are moulded as a social document in the building's fabric.

Nelson Lodge is significant for its association with eminent citizens including the Reverend Arthur Ashworth Aspinall, a founder and first principal of Scots College; Jessie Strahorn (Aspinall) Freeman, significant as a forerunner of women in the medical profession in Australia and Edward Greville, member of the Legislative Assembly for Braidwood (1870 - 1880) and member of the Legislative Council (1892 - 1903) and Edward Grant Ward, Registrar General and Chairman of Lands Titles Commissioners of NSW from 1870.

The fine Australian cedar joinery of Nelson Lodge is of high quality and its intactness is of aesthetic significance.

The substantially intact and recoverable decorative plasterwork at Nelson Lodge is representative of the exuberance of plaster decoration in the 1850s in Australia. The different moulded styles of plaster decoration used throughout Nelson Lodge indicates the full extent of the technological developments of plasterwork prior to the introduction of the gelatin mould technique in 1858. The plasterwork is in reasonable condition and by virtue of being extant is an exceptional example of plasterwork of the 1850s in Australia.

Nelson Lodge was listed on the New South Wales State Heritage Register on 2 April 1999.
