= Fatima Island =

Island in New South Wales, Australia

Coordinates: 33.927145°S 151.156216°E

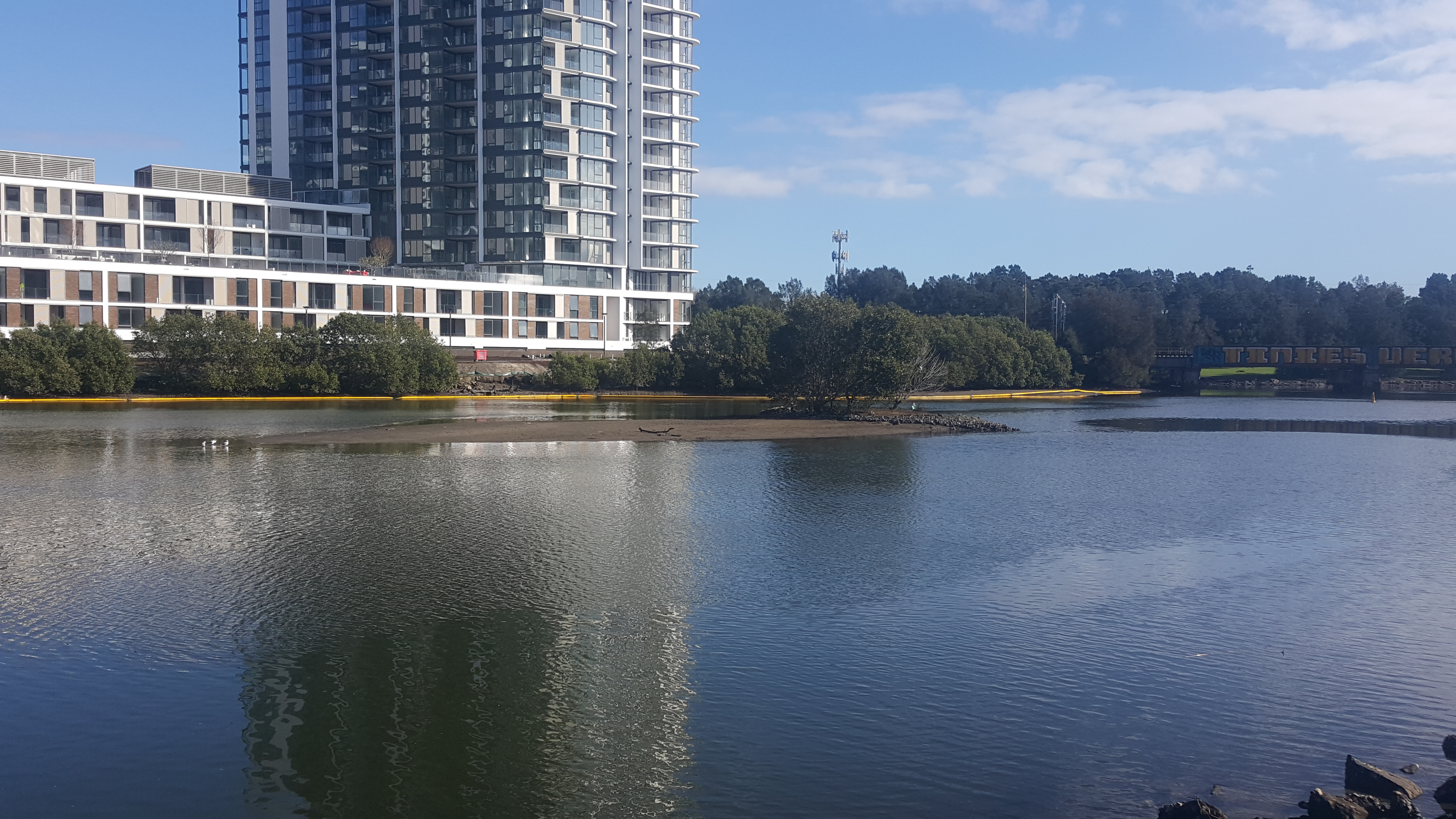
At low tide

Fatima Island is a small island on Cooks River in Tempe, New South Wales, Australia. A low-lying sandbar, it is a refuge for Australian pelicans, egrets and silver gulls. It was named in 1951 for a Portuguese statue of Our Lady of Fátima.

The island is slowly being washed away, something that is of concern to local environmentalists.
