= Coxs Creek (Belfield, New South Wales) =

River in Sydney, New South Wales, Australia

Location
- Country: Australia
- State: New South Wales
- Region: Sydney Basin (IBRA), Inner West
- Local Government Areas: Strathfield, Canterbury-Bankstown

Physical characteristics
- Source
  - location: Wiley Park
  - coordinates: 33.91997°S 151.06292°E
- Mouth: Cooks River
  - location: Strathfield South
  - coordinates: 33.89754°S 151.08232°E
- Length: 3 km (1.9 mi)
- Basin size: 8.8 km^{2} (3.4 mi^{2})

Basin features
- Progression: Cooks → Botany Bay

Coxs Creek, a watercourse of the Cooks River catchment, is located in the Inner West of Sydney, in New South Wales, Australia.

== Course and features ==
Coxs Creek rises northeast of Punchbowl railway station and flows generally north northeast, before reaching its confluence with the Cooks River, at Strathfield South. Over time the creek has been extensively modified and is now largely a storm drain that flows about 3 kilometres (1.9 mi). Prior to development of the area the creek drained paperbark swamps that were formerly near the junction of Roberts Road and Juno Parade. Over time the creek has been extensively modified and rerouted. As with most drainage channels in the area it has been lined along much of its length. Coxs Creek drains a total catchment of 8.8 square kilometres (3.4 sq mi).

The creek begins as a stormwater drain, then runs in the open through the Coxs Creek Wetland, a 1.84 hectares (4.5 acres) reserve containing significant remnant bushland including some Cooks River Castlereagh Ironbark Forest habitat. Including tree specimens of mugga ironbark (Eucalyptus sideroxylon), narrow-leaved ironbark (E. crebra), broad-leaved ironbark (E. fibrosa), and tallowwood (E. microcorys). The forest habitat is noted as an endangered ecological community. Acacia pubescens (Downy Wattle) is a vulnerable flora species present as is the locally endangered Tadgell's Bluebell (Wahlenbergia multicaulis). The endangered Green and Golden Bell Frog (Litoria aurea) has been recorded and frog ponds constructed as part of the creek. The frog has not been seen in the creek since 1995, though they are still present in the nearby constructed wetlands at the Juno Parade Brick Pit.

In 2005 Sydney Ports Corporation proposed works including fauna corridors and "frog ramps" to encourage their return. Along much of its length the creek is a combination of covered channel and an uncovered concrete lined trench. As the creek passes through the reserve it is open and the 2010 management plan calls for restoration of this part of the creek and the adjacent riparian zone.
