= Cup and Saucer Creek =

Creek in Sydney, New South Wales, Australia

Coordinates: 33°55′34″S 151°05′49″E

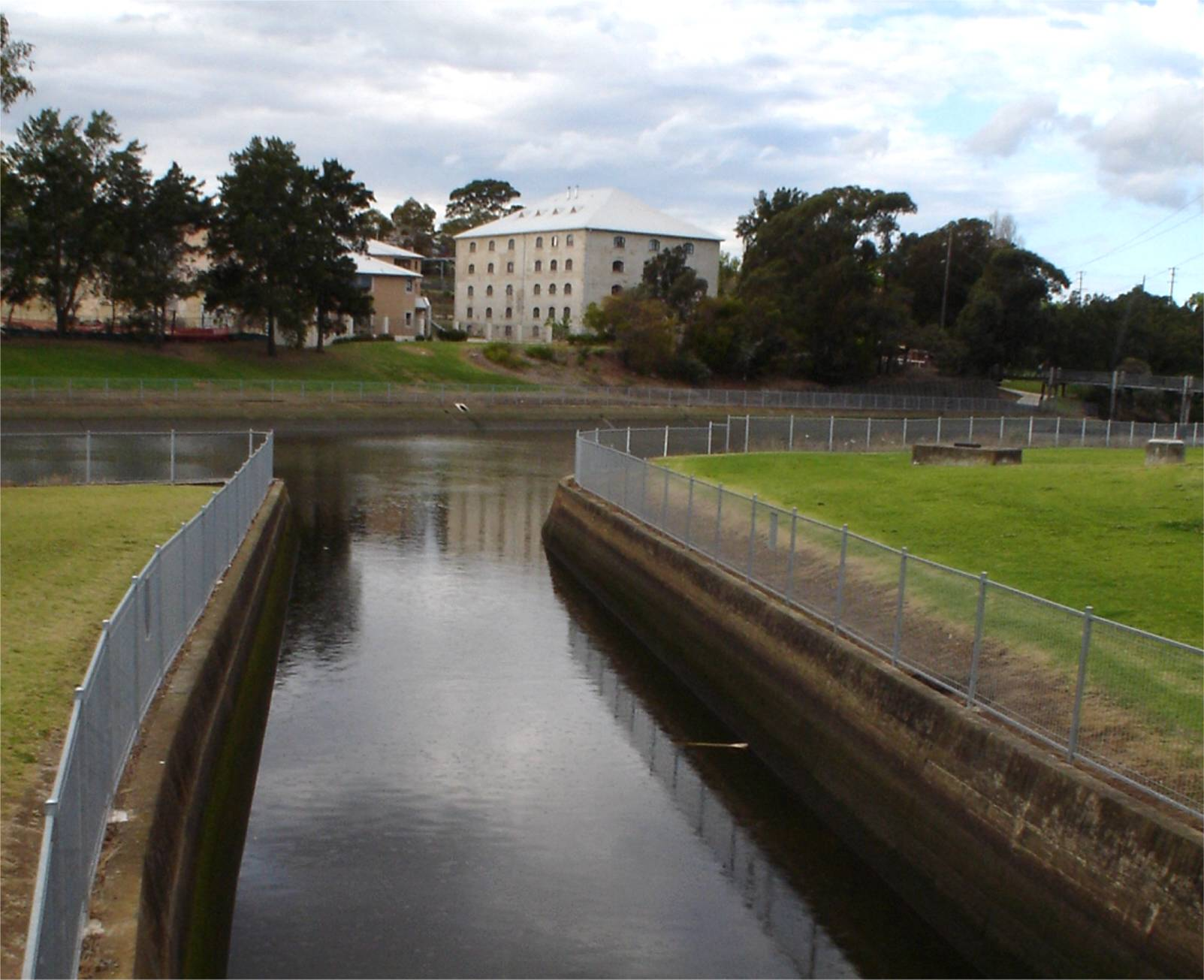
- Cup and Saucer Creek, at its confluence with the Cooks River.

Location
- Country: Australia
- State: New South Wales
- IBRA: Sydney Basin, Canterbury-Bankstown
- District: Southern Sydney
- Municipality: Canterbury

Physical characteristics
- Source
  - location: near Wiley Park railway station
- Mouth: confluence with the Cooks River
  - location: Earlwood
- Length: 4 km (2.5 mi)

Cup and Saucer Creek, an urban watercourse of the Cooks River catchment, is located in the Canterbury-Bankstown region of Sydney, in New South Wales, Australia.

== Course and features ==
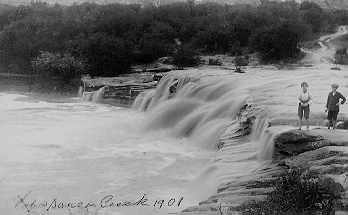
Cup and Saucer Creek, 1901

Cup and Saucer Creek rises in Canterbury local government area, near Wiley Park railway station and flows in an east north-easterly direction through the suburbs of Roselands, Kingsgrove and Clemton Park, where it makes its confluence with the Cooks River, within the suburb of Earlwood. The upper reaches of the creek are a piped drainage system, which becomes part drain and part creek in the lower reaches. The Cup and Saucer Creek Catchment Management Study by the Water Board in 1992 showed extensive toxic organics in the form of polycyclic aromatic hydrocarbons and organochlorines.

The creek is so named because of sandstone formations in the former bed of the creek.

A concrete culvert over Bexley Road constructed in 1920 is listed on the NSW State Heritage Register.
