= Tempe, New South Wales =

Tempe
- Suburb
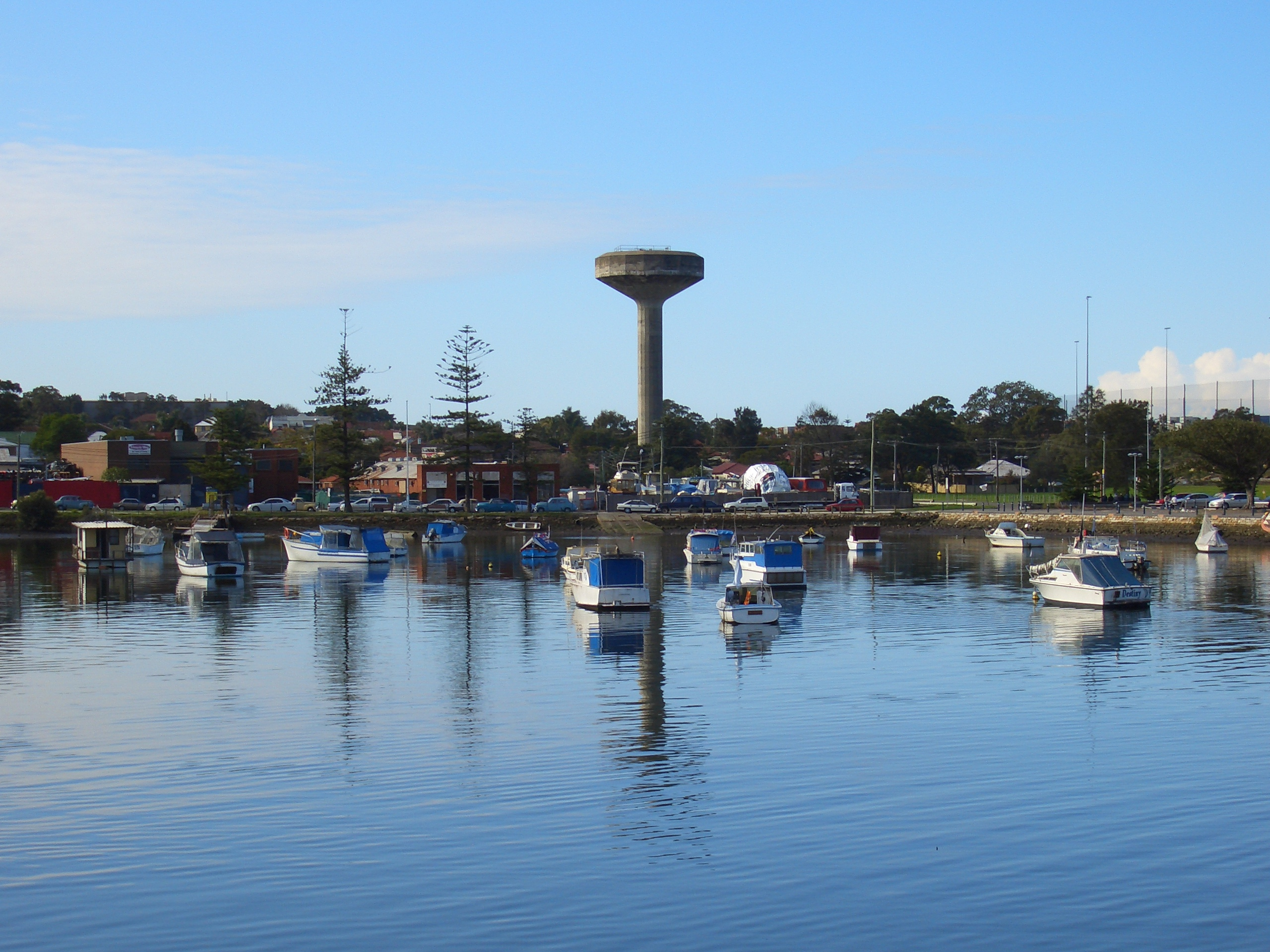
- Cooks River at Tempe

- Interactive map of Tempe
- Coordinates: 33°55′31″S 151°9′30″E
- Country: Australia
- State: New South Wales
- City: Sydney
- LGA: Inner West Council
- Location: 9 km (5.6 mi) S of Sydney CBD

Government
  - State electorate: Heffron
  - Federal division: Grayndler

Area
  - Total: 1.85 km^{2} (0.71 sq mi)
- Elevation: 5 m (16 ft)

Population
  - Total: 3,550 (2021 census)
  - Density: 1,919/km^{2} (4,970/sq mi)
- Postcode: 2044
Suburbs around Tempe
Marrickville	Sydenham	St Peters
Marrickville	Tempe	Mascot
Earlwood	Wolli Creek	Arncliffe

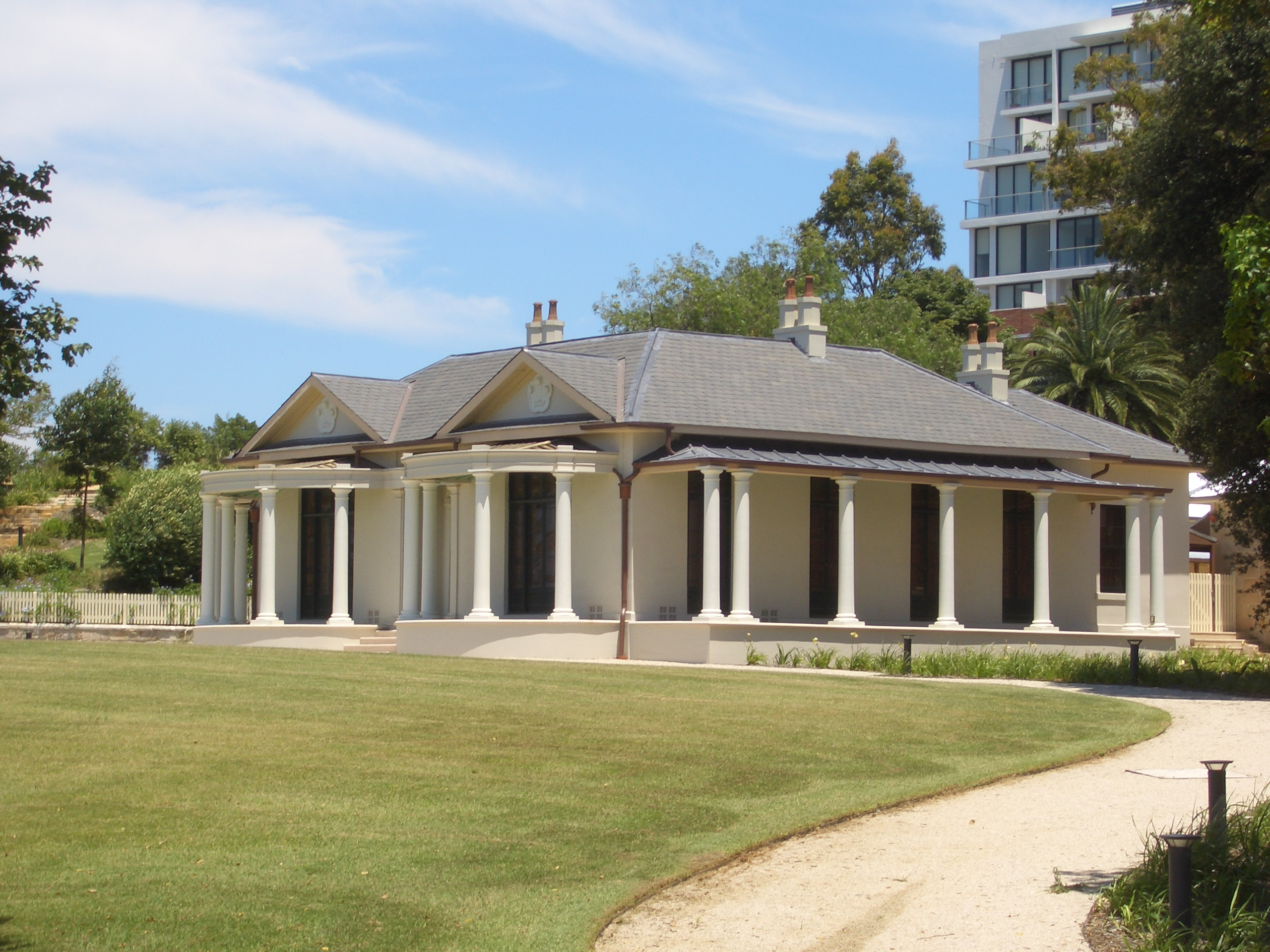
Tempe House

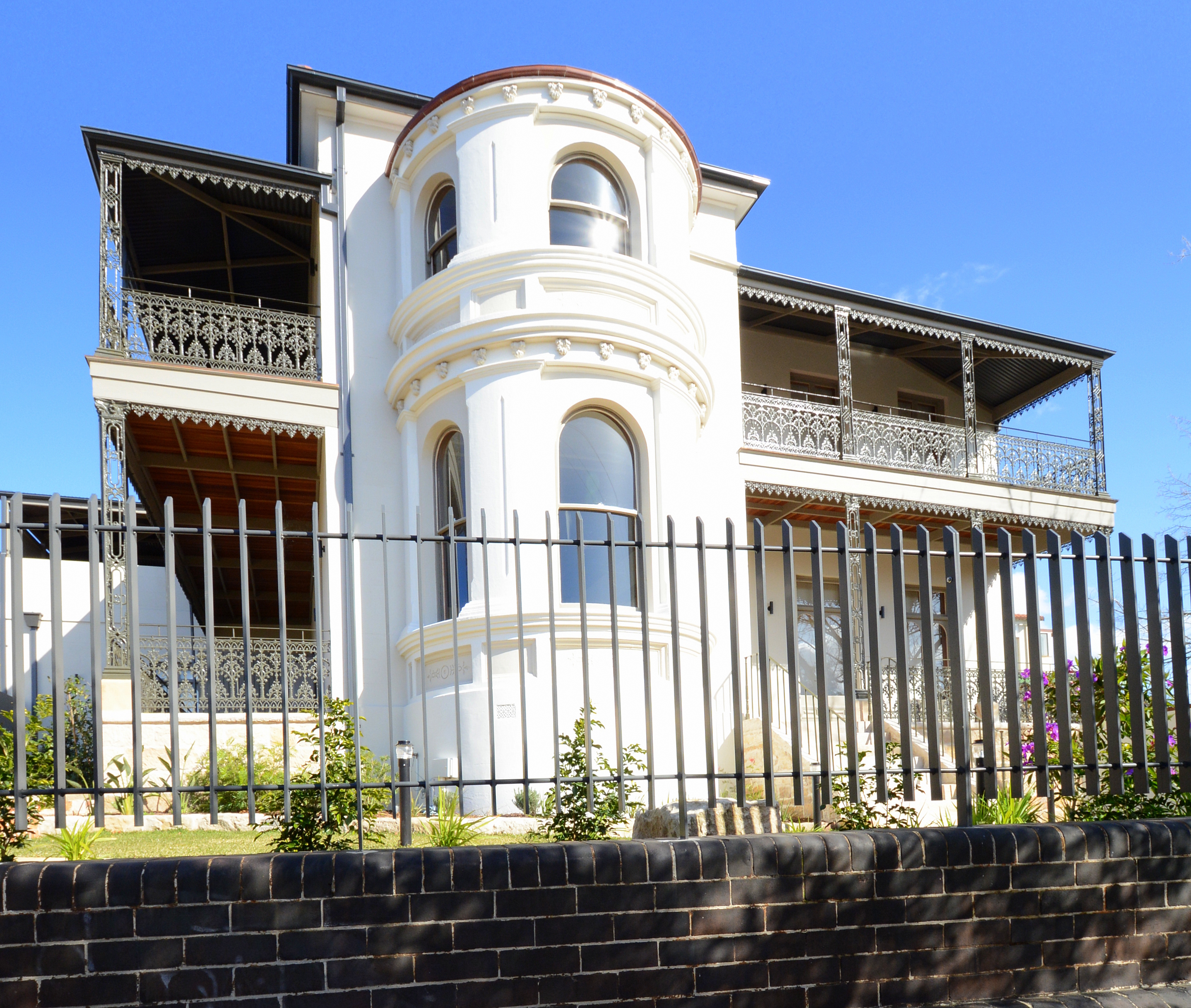
Lymerston, built in 1843

Tempe (/tɛmpiː/ tem-PEE;) is a suburb in the Inner West of Sydney, in the state of New South Wales, Australia. Tempe is located 9 kilometres south of the Sydney central business district in the local government area of Inner West Council.

Tempe sits on the northern bank of the Cooks River and is separated from Sydney Airport by the Alexandra Canal, also known as Sheas Creek. The Wolli Creek waterway also empties into the Cooks River.

== History ==
Tempe was named after the mansion on the southern banks of the Cooks River in the area that is now known as Wolli Creek. Alexander Brodie Spark (1792–1856), an immigrant from Elgin, Scotland, built Tempe House in 1836. It was named after the 'Vale of Tempe', a beautiful valley set at the foot of Mount Olympus in Greece, which was prominent in ancient Greek legend. Tempe House, designed by John Verge (1772–1861) in the Georgian style, is regarded as one of the great houses of Sydney. It is listed with the Heritage Council of New South Wales as well as the State Heritage Register. Tempe House and surrounding buildings operated as a Magdalene asylum from 1885 to 1985. Spark also donated money towards the purchase of land and the building of St Peter's Church of England, which gave its name to the suburb of St Peters, to the north of Tempe.

Frederick Wright Unwin, who gave his name to Unwins Bridge Road, was prominent in the legal profession in Sydney's early days. William Bede Dalley, after whom Dalley Street was named, studied under Unwin and became one of the members of the first parliament in New South Wales in 1856. A prominent businessman during the late 19th century, William Fanning, had Fanning Street named after him, which is situated in what used to be known as Tempe Village.

Way Street was named after the Way family. The solicitor Richard Henry Way built Lymerston, an Italianate villa that still stands in Hillcrest Street, in 1842–43. What is now Lymerston Street was originally the carriageway from the Princes Highway to the house. Lymerston was one of the villa estates subdivided by Robert Campbell. It survives as one of the better examples of the large villas of the 1840s, few of which remain. It was a Sisters of Mercy convent from 1915 to 1982, after which it was used as a residential education centre. It was later sold as a private home. It is heritage-listed. There is a memorial window to the Way family in St Peters Church, St Peters.

Another prominent family was the Harber family. Emmanuel Harber started brickmaking in 1863. He was followed by Abel Harber, who carried on brickmaking on Unwins Bridge Road, before moving to Marrickville. Emmanuel, Abel and Elias Harber were aldermen on St Peters Council. There is a memorial window to the Harber family in St Peter's Church.

Gannon Street was named after the Gannon family. Michael Gannon arrived in Sydney in 1820 as a convict. After being pardoned, he opened an inn on the Cooks River Road. Fred Gannon built his Italianate home Hurlingham in Union Street. It still stands and is now heritage-listed. Jane Gannon was buried in St Peter's Church.

In 1963, Harry Triguboff bought a block of land in Smith Street and constructed a block of eight units. This was Triguboff's first development. Later, after his Gladesville development in Meriton Street, he would establish his company Meriton Apartments.

=== Trams ===
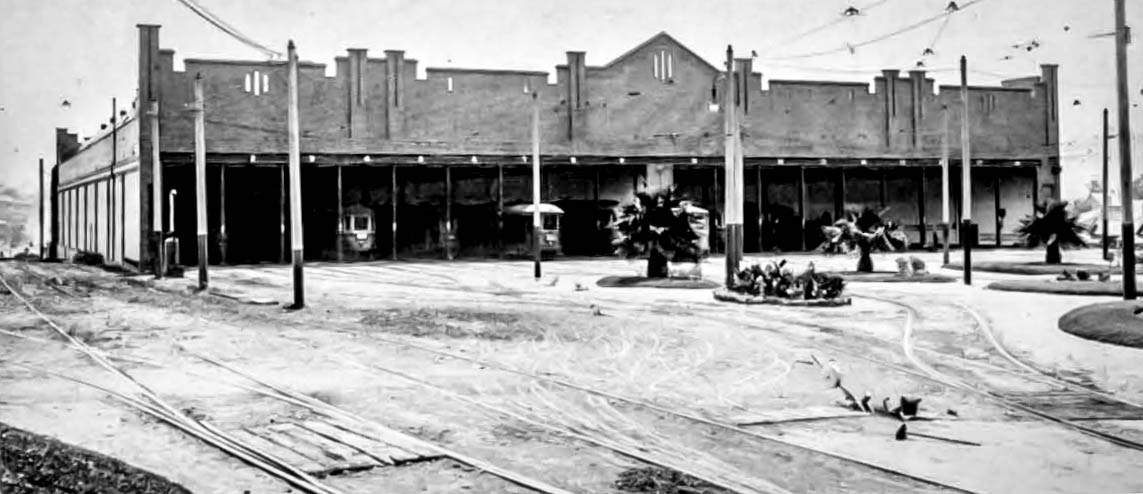
Tempe Depot from the Princes Highway in the 1920s

A tram service once operated from Circular Quay along the Cooks River line to Tempe. This service was extended to St Peters as a steam tramway in 1891 and then to Tempe in 1900 when electric services commenced. The line ran down City Road from Broadway, then along King Street, Newtown before proceeding down the Princes Highway to its terminus at the Cooks River. At Tempe, a connection led to Tempe Depot. Past the terminus at the Cooks River, a single line led over the river to the Wolli Creek Per-way Yard, a large area accessible by both trains and trams. This was where the Sydney tramways housed its maintenance material.

The cross country Cooks River - Dulwich Hill line connected the Tempe line and the Dulwich Hill line via Sydenham, operating along Railway Road and Sydenham Road in Sydenham. Cars for this lines got housed at Tempe Depot, one of two depots in the area, the other being Newtown. These two depots housed most of the cars used on these services, except for cars running from the City

Due to the installment of the tram line the area became a popular resort, with large crowds attracted for swimming and boating on the river. The line closed in 1957, and bus 422 parallels the former line. When buses replaced trams, the Tempe Tram Depot became the Tempe Bus Depot. The railway station opened in 1884 but was originally called Cooks River.

=== Railway ===
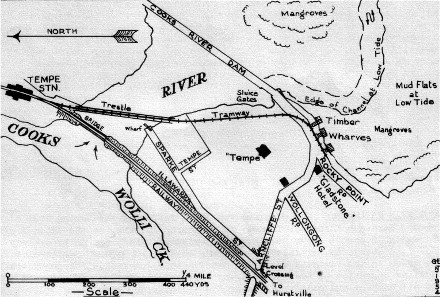
Map of Contractor's Tramline

The contractors for the construction of the first 23-mile [37 km] section of the Illawarra Railway arranged with timber mills in the Port Stephens and Manning River districts for the supply of sleepers and other timber necessary for the construction. This material was brought down by sea to Botany Bay in schooners and small coastal steamers. The vessels anchored off the entrance to Cooks River and discharged their cargoes on to flat-bottomed punts. Tugs towed the laden punts along the channels of the river to the head of navigation at the Tempe Dam, near the present Princes Highway bridge. On the river bank, immediately to the south of the dam, the contractors erected three wharves where the timber was unloaded and placed on small 4-wheeled railway trucks for conveyance by horse teams, over a temporary tramway, to the company's depot which was established about midway between St Peters and Sydenham railway stations. A large amount of material of all descriptions, including steelwork, for the railway bridge at Como, was also taken over the tramway from the depot to the wharves, where it was loaded on to a small paddle steamer for conveyance to Como via Botany Bay and Georges River.

=== Tempe Tip ===
Tempe is the site of several large clay quarries used to supply the large brick kilns located on the Princes Highway at St Peters. These kilns supplied many of the bricks used throughout Sydney. Fossils of a very large amphibian were discovered in the clay, and one is now displayed at the reptile exhibits at Taronga Park Zoo.

The pits were used for landfill, known colloquially as 'Tempe Tip', which caught fire in 1988. The tip has been redeveloped into extended parkland. Nowadays, 'Tempe Tip' is an urban nickname for a large Salvation Army-run charity store, located in Bellevue Street Tempe; but despite the suggestion, this Salvos store is not a rubbish dump.

A comedy film was released in 2002 entitled Tempe Tip, ostensibly set in Tempe but actually shot in Adelaide.

=== Heritage ===
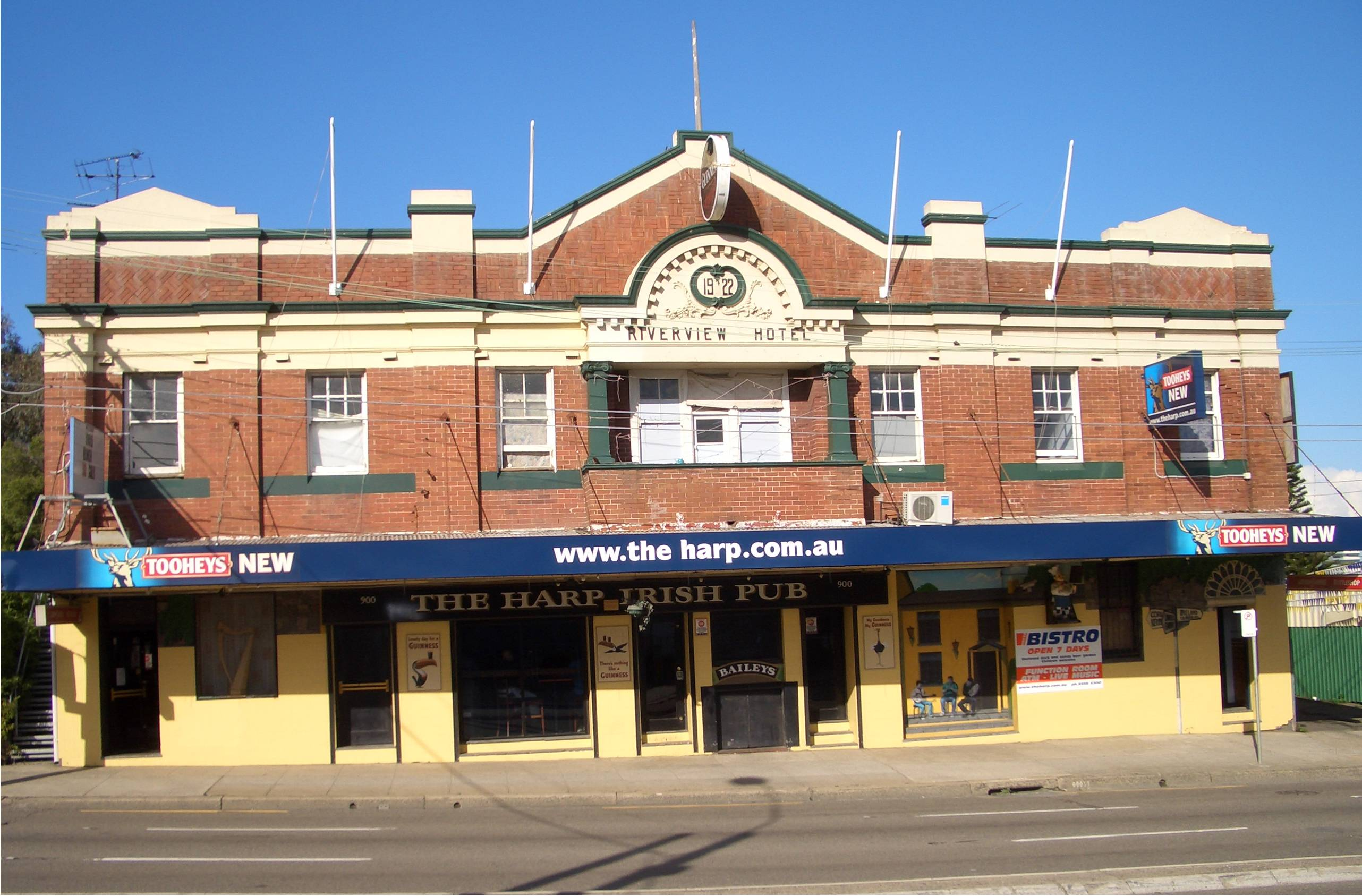
The Riverview Hotel, formerly Valve Bar & Venue, formerly the Harp Irish Pub, and originally the Riverview Hotel, Princes Highway

An historic home, formerly known as Leinster Hall and Nelson Lodge is Milford Haven. Located at 125 Unwins Bridge Road, this single-storey house, built circa 1858, is as an example of the Australian bungalow and is listed on the Register of the National Estate.

In July 2009, Tempe residents gained Interim Heritage Orders to protect the former quarry cliff face, (the quarry where the stone for Milford Haven-Nelson Lodge was quarried from), a man-made sandstone block retaining wall built in the 1880s, a historical footpath with historical views, a late 19th-century Federation cottage and a Californian bungalow, all of which were at risk of complete demolition from a 37 townhouse development. This development was refused by Marrickville Council after over forty submissions were made against it by Tempe residents. However, this refusal was later appealed in the Land and Environment Court where an amended application for 27 townhouses was won after Marrickville Council agreed to Consent Orders with the developer after a closed door Council meeting on 20 October 2009. This subdivision, named "The Quarry", was due to be completed in September 2013.

Tempe has a number of heritage-listed sites, including:

- 44 Barden Street: Timber Slab Cottage
- Illawarra railway: Tempe railway station
- 125 Unwins Bridge Road: Nelson Lodge (also known as Milford Haven)

== Population ==
In the 2021 Census, there were 3,550 people in Tempe. 63.1% of people were born in Australia. The next most common countries of birth were North Macedonia 3.4%, Vietnam 3.4%, England 3.3%, New Zealand 2.1% and Greece 1.9%. 67.0% of people spoke only English at home. Other languages spoken at home included Macedonian 4.4%, Vietnamese 4.0%, Cantonese 3.4%, Greek 2.9% and Mandarin 1.6%. The most common responses for religion in Tempe were No Religion 50.0%, Catholic 16.5%, Eastern Orthodox 7.9%, Anglican 4.6% and Not stated 4.5%.

== Commercial area ==
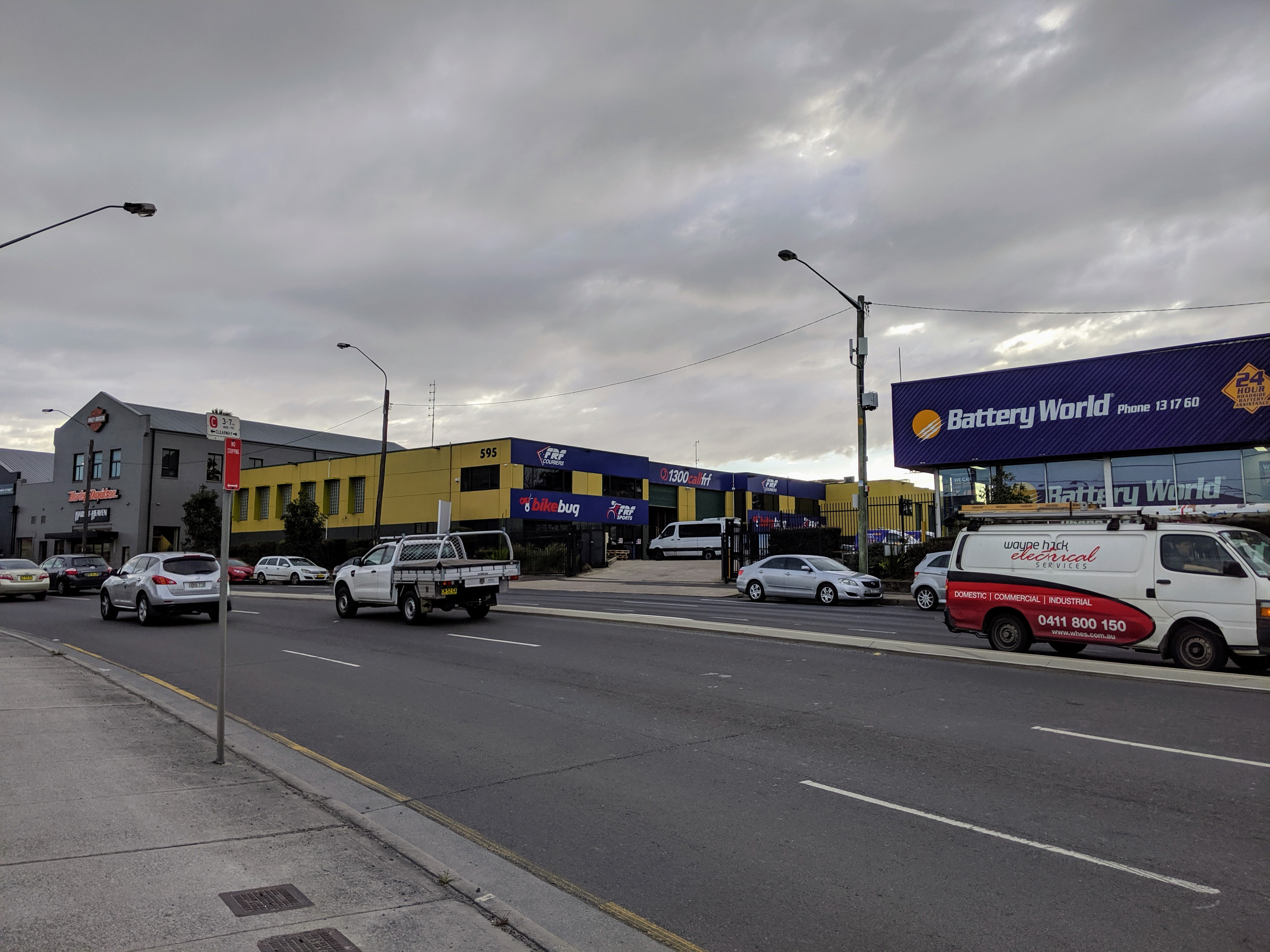
Businesses on Princes Highway

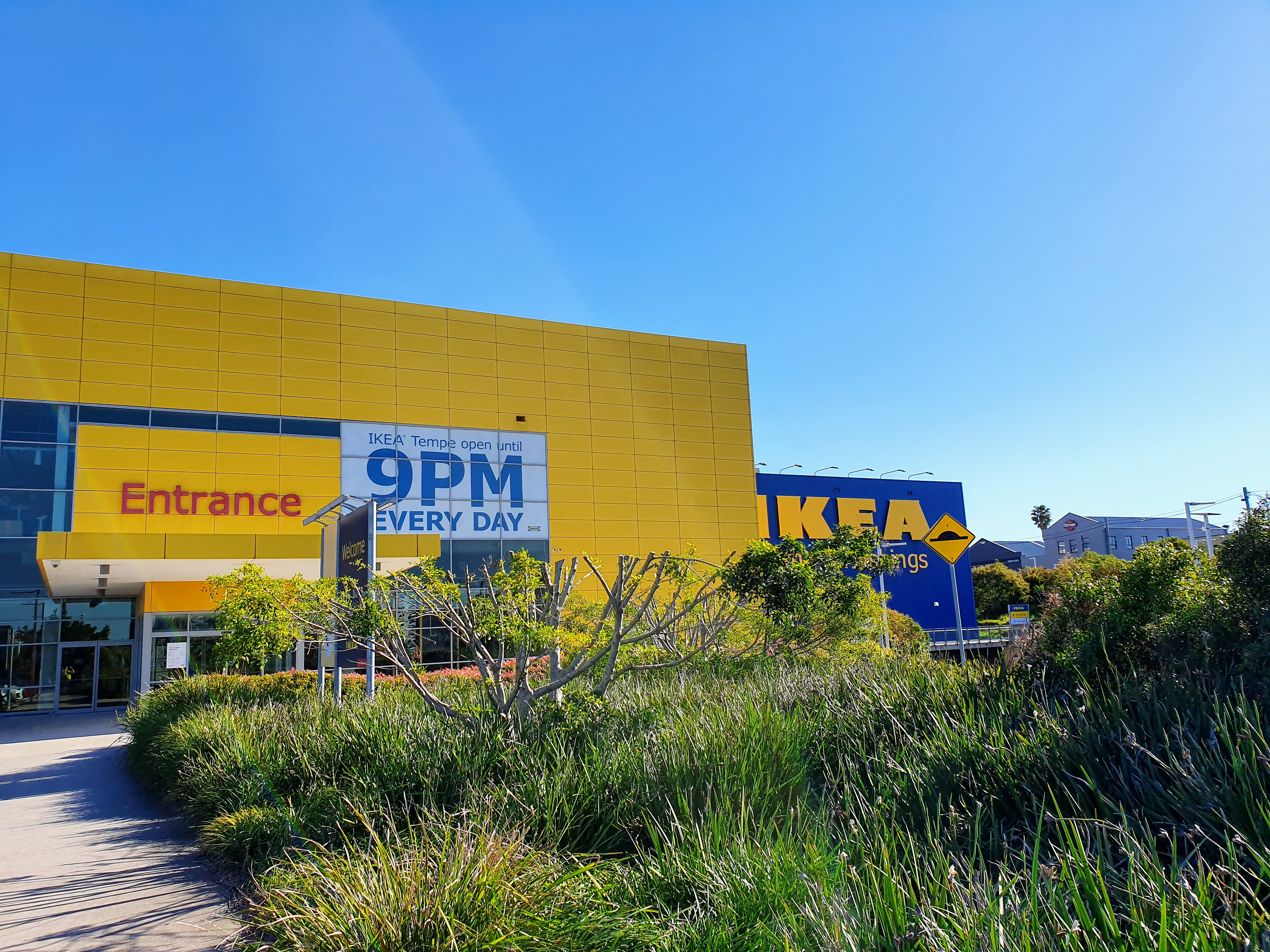
IKEA Store in Tempe

Tempe's commercial area is located along the Princes Highway. The main shopping strip includes the Tempe Hotel, a newsagency, a light and sound store, a doctor's surgery, a dentist's surgery, a Thai Restaurant, a picture framing business "Frame Up", and Camera Warehouse. The Riverview Hotel, formerly Valve Bar and Venue, formerly the Harp Irish Pub, and originally the Riverview Hotel (built in 1922), is located on the Princes Highway close to Harry's Cafe de Wheels, formerly known as Deno's Diner, formerly known as Cobb & Co., a fast food outlet designed on the 1950s drive-in model.

Commercial and light industrial premises stretch north to Sydenham and St Peters–this stretch includes the largest IKEA in the Southern Hemisphere, opened in 2011. There were two small licensed clubs beside the Cooks River, the Newtown Jets Sports Club and the Cooks River Motor Boat Club. Both have now closed.

== Transport ==
The Princes Highway runs north towards the city and south towards Arncliffe and Rockdale. Unwins Bridge Road is the other main road in the suburb.

Tempe railway station is serviced by the Sydney Trains Illawarra line services. Transit Systems route 422 runs along the Princes Highway from Tempe to Railway Square, in the Sydney CBD, while the 425 route connects Tempe to Dulwich Hill.

Sydenham railway station, on the northern border of Tempe, connects the suburb to the Sydney Metro (opened August 2024), as well as the Canterbury Bankstown and Illawarra line services of Sydney Trains.

== Worship places ==
- Tempe Uniting Church
- Al Hijrah Mosque at 45 Station Street
- St Peter and St Paul Catholic Church (now closed)

== Schools ==
- Tempe High School
- Tempe Public School

== Sport and recreation ==
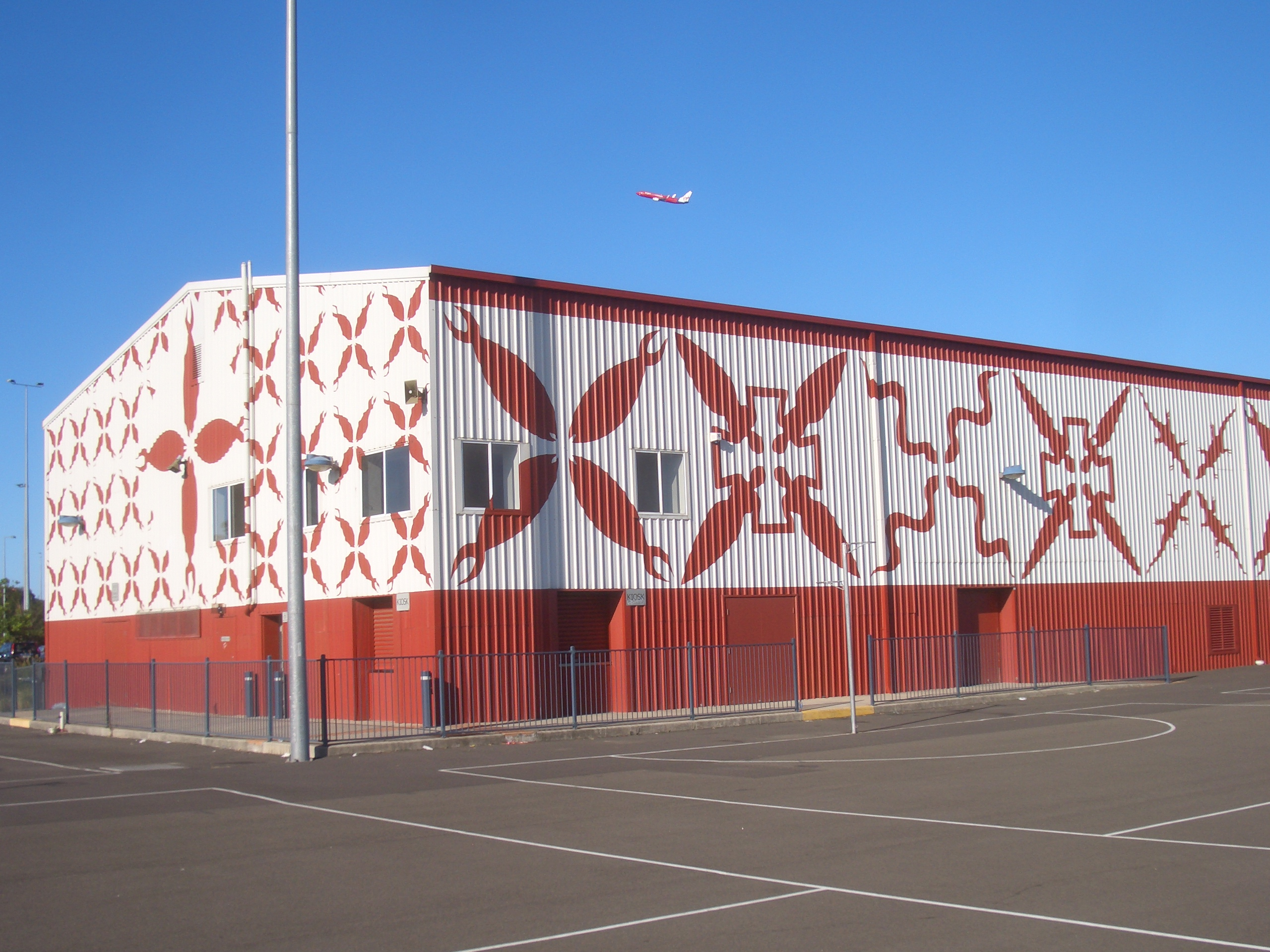
Robyn Webster Sports Centre

- Tempe Recreational Reserve, a large park next to Cooks River, includes an indoor sporting complex called the Robyn Webster Sports Centre, netball courts, football fields, cricket pitches and an extensive jungle-gym for children.
- Col Jones Swim centre located on Toyer Street. Facilities available are a 25-metre indoor swimming pool (catering to lap swimmers), sauna, spa and steam room. In addition, a large range of gym equipment (free weights and pin loaded) and cardio theatre containing treadmills, bikes and X trainers.
- The Concordia German Club which was founded in 1883 is located in Mackay Park, Richardson Crescent and the Concordia German Choir meets at the Club on Wednesdays at 7:30pm for choir practice. The Concordia German Choir has annual performances at the Club in Tempe as well as at various other venues. New members to the Choir are always welcome.
