= South Sydney Development Corporation =

Agency of the NSW Government

Government agency overview
- Formed: 1996
- Dissolved: 2005
- Headquarters: Sydney
- Key document: Growth Centres (Development Corporations) Act 1974 (NSW)

The South Sydney Development Corporation was an agency of the NSW Government operating from 1996 until its abolition in 2005.

== History ==
The organisation was responsible for promoting, coordinating and managing the development of the former industrial area around Green Square, New South Wales.
