= Cooks River =

River in Sydney, New South Wales, Australia

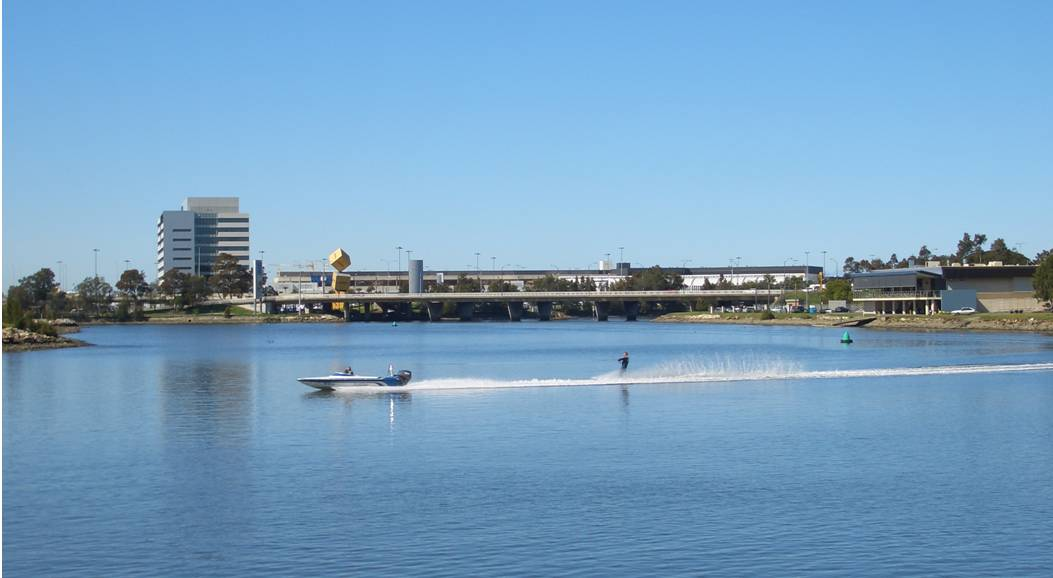
- Cooks River near Sydney Airport

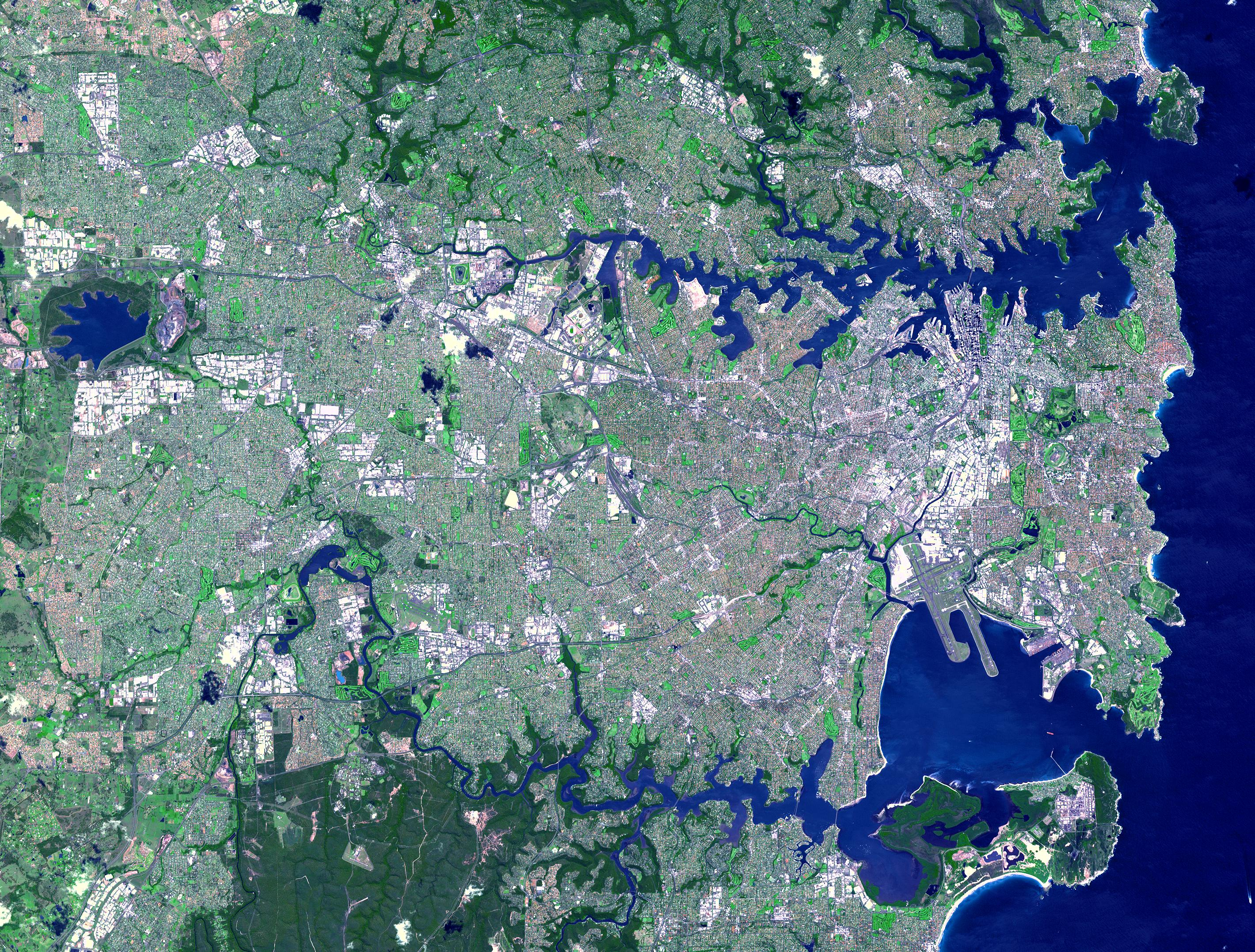
- NASA satellite image of the Cooks River, with the location of the mouth, as marked
- Native name: Goolay'yari (Dharuk) (Cadigal)

Location
- Country: Australia
- State: New South Wales
- Region: Sydney basin (IBRA), Inner West
- City: Sydney

Physical characteristics
- Source: Graf Park
  - location: Yagoona
- Mouth: Botany Bay
  - location: Kyeemagh
  - coordinates: 33°56′57″S 151°10′06″E
- Length: 23 km (14 mi)
- Basin size: 100 km^{2} (39 sq mi)

Basin features
- River system: Botany Bay
- Tributaries
  - left: Cup and Saucer Creek, Alexandra Canal
  - right: Coxs Creek, Wolli Creek

The Cooks River, a semi-mature tide-dominated drowned valley estuary, is a tributary of Botany Bay, located in southern Sydney, New South Wales, Australia.

The course of the 23-kilometre-long (14 mi) urban waterway has been altered to accommodate various developments along its shore. It serves as part of a stormwater system for the 100 square kilometres (39 sq mi) of its watershed, and many of the original streams running into it have been turned into concrete lined channels. The tidal sections support significant areas of mangrove ecosystems and are used for recreational activities.

== Course ==
The river begins at Graf Park, Yagoona, then flows in a roughly north-easterly direction to Chullora. It reaches its northernmost point at Strathfield, where it leads into a concrete open canal, no more than one metre wide and thirty centimetres deep. It then heads towards the south-east. Where Cooks River runs through Strathfield Golf Course, the concrete lining has been partly removed. Here the plants have returned and have created an environment where the water is filtered and runs clean, and where wildlife has returned. One section here is called the Chain of Ponds.

At Belfield it joins with the Cox Creek Channel and flows in an easterly direction. The canal widens and deepens as it picks up stormwater from surrounding suburbs, such as Campsie and becomes influenced by tidal action.

At Canterbury, it is joined by Cup and Saucer Creek. Industrial areas line the Cooks River at Canterbury. In the past, factories discharged their waste directly into the water.

The valley becomes more pronounced as the river reaches Tempe, where it is joined by Wolli Creek and the Alexandra Canal. The Princes Highway crosses the Cooks River and links Tempe to the suburb of Wolli Creek. Also here is the low-lying Fatima Island, which is submerged at high tide.

The course of the final south-flowing section of river is entirely artificial. The river formerly flowed, via marshes, on a meandering course across the present site of Sydney Airport to meet Mill Stream and enter Botany Bay from the northern end of the bay. The boundary between the Parish of Botany and the Parish of St George remains at the former mouth of Cooks River. This part of the river course was altered to accommodate the expanding Sydney Airport. Cooks River now connects with Botany Bay at Kyeemagh.

The corridor of land beside the river is a conduit for many services along large parts of its length including electricity, high-voltage lines, a high-pressure oil pipe owned by Shell, and high-volume sewage pipes. Many of the lower-lying areas have been filled and are parks and sports grounds. In spite of this the river and adjacent lands are being recognised for their beauty, history, amenity and environmental value, if not also for potential for improvements. The walkway and cycleway beside much of the river is part of the path connecting Sydney Olympic Park with Botany Bay.

== Management ==
Care and control of the river is shared between many local councils and the New South Wales Government through agencies such as the Sydney Metropolitan Catchment Management Authority, the Department of Planning & Environment and Sydney Water.

The river also has a number of community-based organisations which assist its maintenance, in particular the Cooks River Valley Association (CRVA). The CRVA grew from The Cooks River Improvement League, founded in 1925, which had published a book entitled "Our Ocean to Ocean Opportunity". The League recommended cleaning up the river by developing a canal system and removing of the footings of Tempe Dam, proposal which had been made originally by engineer H B Henson, in 1896.

In 2010 the Cup and Saucer Wetlands were built in Canterbury to create a natural environment for the native wildlife and fauna.

Selected areas of the Cooks River which is lined with concrete will be replaced in 2013 and 2014 with a more natural bank with sandstone rocks and indigenous planting.

== Environmental issues ==
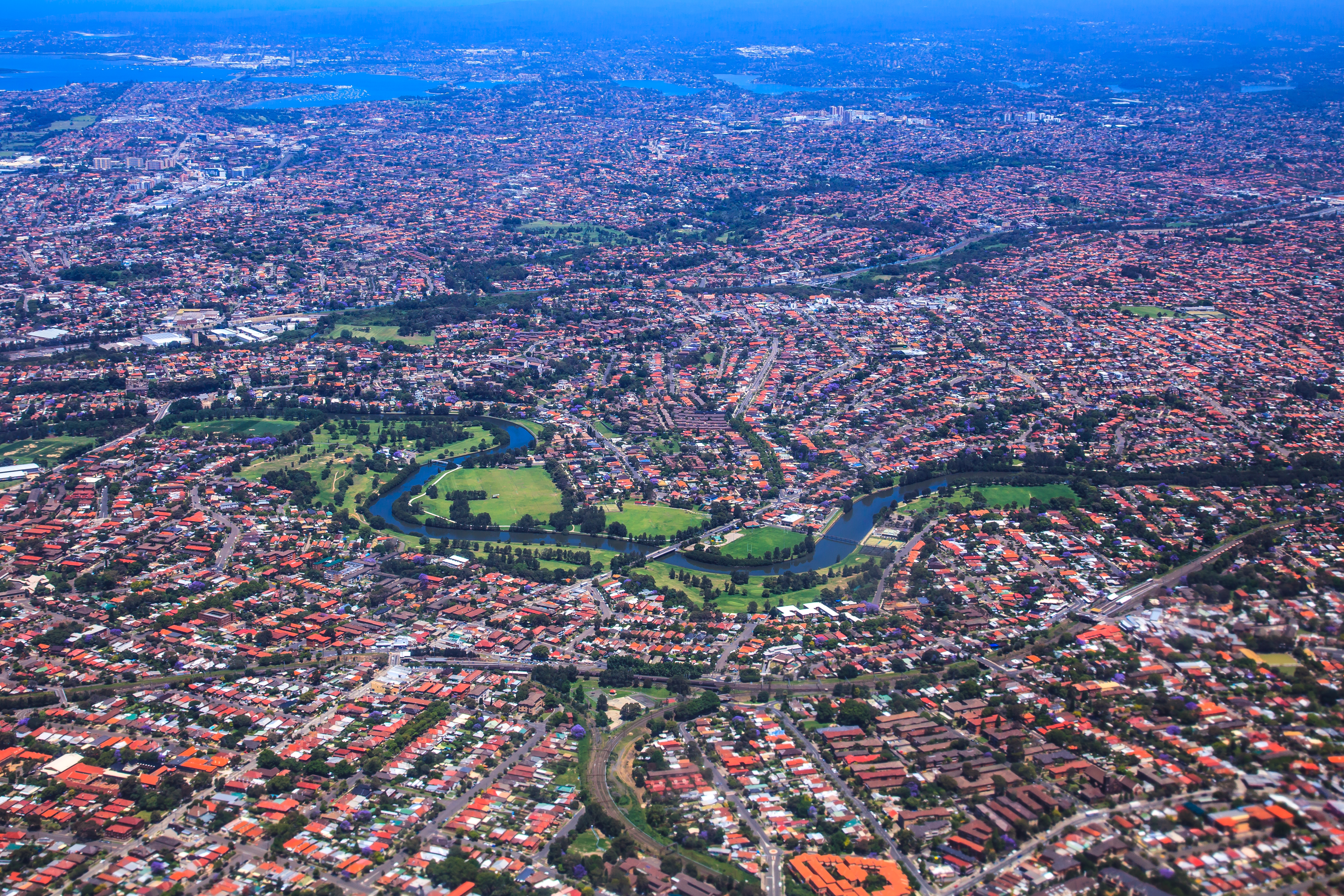
Aerial view of the river and surrounding suburbs

The Cooks River has a catchment area of 100 square kilometres (39 sq mi), within the metropolitan areas of Sydney enclosed by urban environments and extensive recreational areas. Over 400,000 people live in this area and there are over 100,000 commercial and industrial premises. The river has typical water catchment management problems characteristic of heavily urbanised areas, including:

- Removal of native vegetation and habitat destruction
- Modified hydrology including increased peak run-off rates due to covering of land with hard surfaces, concrete storm water canals and re-routing of water courses
- Pollution from motor vehicles, litter, sewage, illegal dumping, industrial, commercial and domestic activities
- Nutrient enrichment from surrounding environment, especially due to water runoffs from recreational parks, resulting in increased algal levels

The Cooks River Alliance is a partnership between councils in the Cooks River Catchment. It works with the local communities to restore the health of the river. The Alliance Board is made up of one councillor from each member council. The members of the Cooks River Alliance are: Bayside, Canterbury-Bankstown, City of Sydney, Inner West and Strathfield. The Alliance combines and builds resources, experience, knowledge and skills within councils and communities, to work on complex environmental challenges. Community Representatives will have the opportunity to contribute to the direction of the Alliance, and provide local resident perspectives.

Water quality testing conducted by the Water Research Centre found quantities of pharmaceutical and industrial chemicals at levels similar to untreated sewage. A very old and broken sewerage system has been blamed for the contaminants which included soaps, insecticides, caffeine and anticonvulsants.

A group of local Councils fund the project named Riverlife, which trains tour guides and organises interpretive walking and cycling tours of the "river" most weekends.

In 2022, educator and YouTuber Beau Miles attempted to paddle a kayak down the full length of the Cooks River, producing a documentary of the journey to highlight the poor condition of the river, which he called the "sickest urban river in Australia".

== History ==
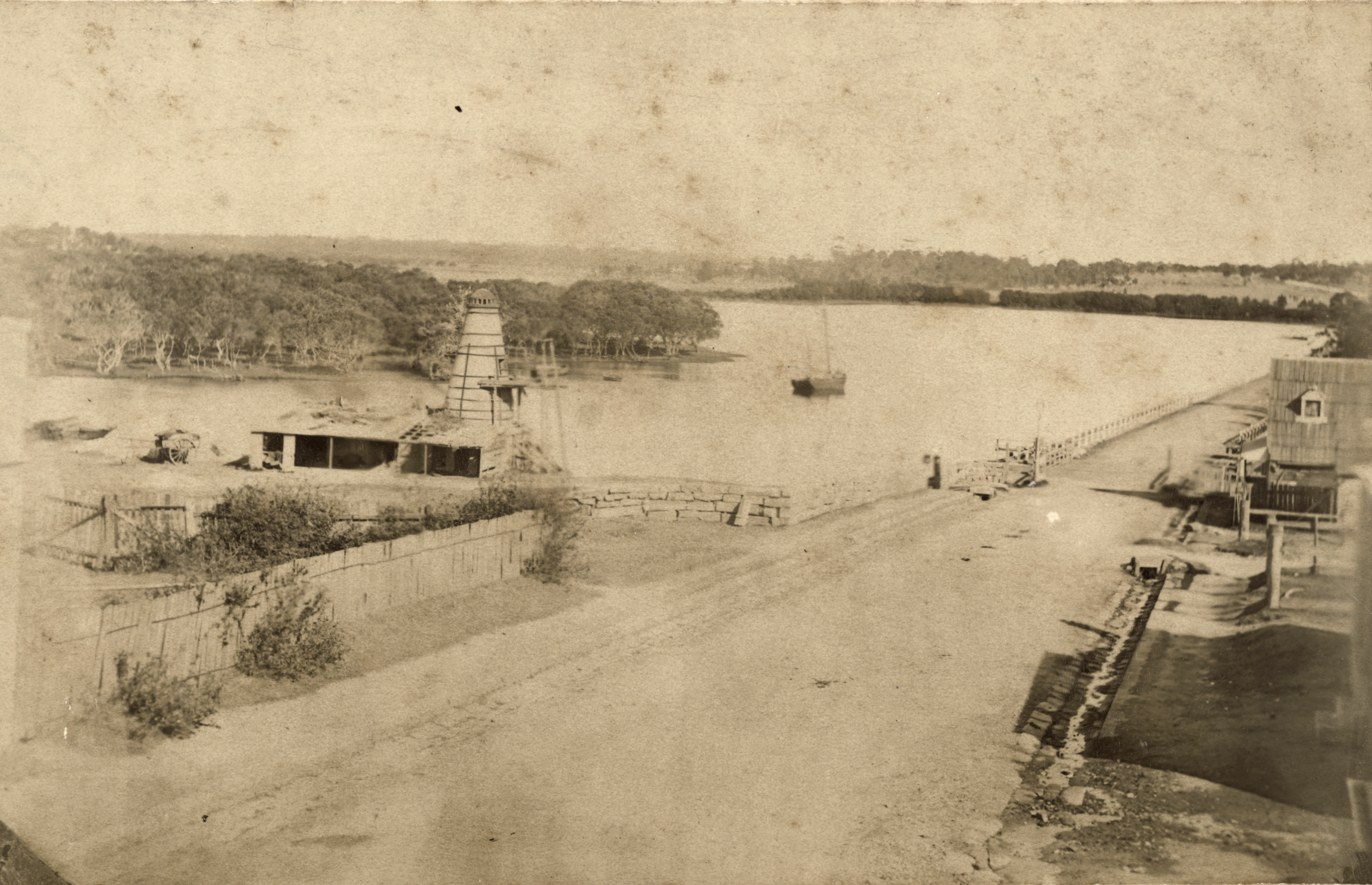
Lime kiln and dam, Cooks River ca. 1875

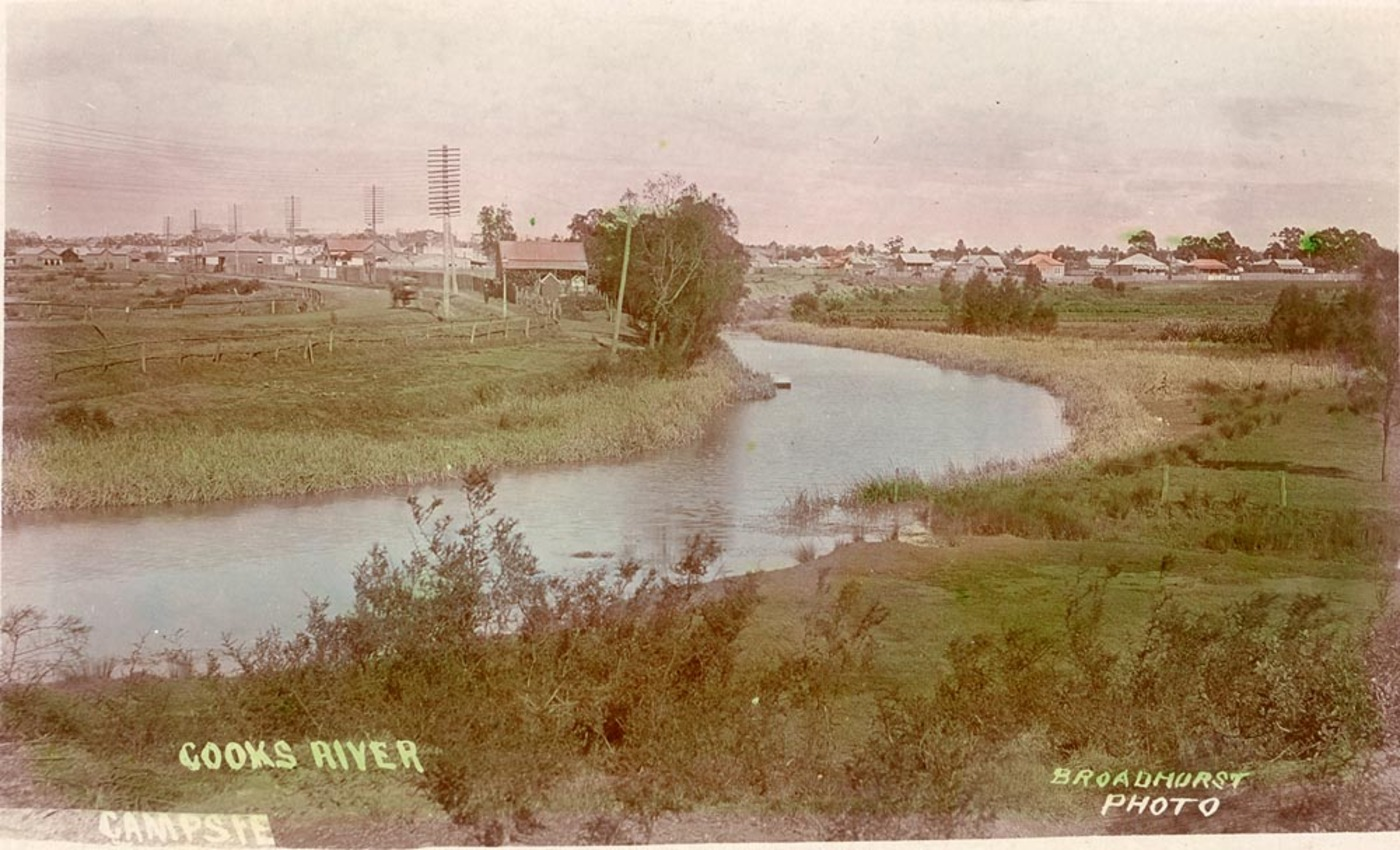
View of the Cooks River at Campsie ca. 1900-1927

Before European Settlement, the Indigenous Australian population used the river by fishing and gathering shellfish. This had little effect on the river's natural ecology as sustainable practices were adhered to. It is generally thought that four different clans, each speaking a distinct dialect of the Darug language, inhabited the area surrounding the river. The Bediagal clan occupied the area on the southern side of the river. whilst on the northern side, it is generally thought that the Gameygal clan lived between the mouth of the Cooks River and the ocean. Further west, the river was used by the Cadigal people (whose country extended north up to Port Jackson and took in the area where modern-day Sydney is now located). Further west still and along the upper reaches of the river, the country was occupied by the Wangal people.

In 1770, Captain Cook sailed into Botany Bay and made the first written description of the river as follows: "I found a very fine stream of fresh water on the north side in the first sandy cove within the island before which a ship might lay land-locked and wood for fuel may be got everywhere." The existence of the river appeared to make settlement a possibility; however, when the First Fleet arrived the river and valley was regarded as unsuitable. Captain John Hunter and Lieutenant Bradley both mentioned the shallowness of the water and large swamp areas. In July 1791, Watkin Tench and William Dawes explored south of Rose Hill (modern Parramatta) in search of a large river, which they described as a “second Nile or Ganges.” They found instead a tidal saltwater creek that drained into Botany Bay, likely part of the Cooks River or its tributaries, and noted the lack of fresh water for drinking along its banks. The first land grants along the river tended to be fairly large and used mostly for grazing and timber with some fishing and lime burning at Botany Bay. Governor Macquarie makes reference to a slender bridge in his 1810 diary, adding that "the soil is bad and neither good for tillage or pasturage". Nevertheless, some farmers did find they could till the land and settlement along the river spread, and roads and crossings were made in several places.

In the 1830s a dam was built across the river; however, this did not provide a clean water supply and the structure itself began to damage the river's ecology by preventing tidal flushing of deposited urban silt. A second dam was built to serve a sugar mill at the new village of Canterbury Vale. The location took advantage of the water supply and barge transport. The mill closed in 1855; however, other polluting industries were later to follow including wool washes, tanneries and boiling down works. Despite the increasingly doubtful quality of the water, the river remained a popular place in the late nineteenth century for boating, picnics and swimming. In 1894, artist Sydney Long painted an idyllic scene of boys swimming in the Cook's River, entitled By Tranquil Waters, which was so well received that it was bought by the Trustees of the Art Gallery of New South Wales. By the 1880s tree clearing resulted in erosion, silting and expansion of reed beds, blocking river flow.

On the weekend of 25–27 May 1889, 425 millimetres (16.7 in) of rain inundated all the low-lying land. At the height of the flood, the top of the Sugarworks Dam was covered by 3 metres (10 ft) of water. Authorities responded to the extensive damage and loss of animals by removing the dams and weirs. A proposed series of canals connecting the river with Sydney Harbour was not commenced. A sewage farm operated near the mouth of the river from 1889 to 1916. A railway was used in both the construction of mains and filtration buildings, as well as in the day-to-day operation, moving screened solids throughout the farm.

Concreting of the river banks commenced in the 1930s and the Cooks River Improvement Act of 1946 confirmed the policy of the tidying up of an undisciplined stream within neat cement boundaries. Between 1947 and 1953, engineers diverted the original river mouth to the west of Sydney Airport to accommodate new runways.

Initiatives from 1976 onwards have attempted to preserve and return the natural features of the river system with tree planting, pollution traps and landscaping. Footpaths and a cycle track were built to increase recreational use of the river. The NSW State Government committed A$2.9 million to the restoration of the sheet piling on the banks of the river. In November 2007 the Federal Australian Labor Party, then in opposition, made an announcement of A$2 million for environmental projects on the Cooks River.

In 2009, Strathfield Council established the Cooks River Fun Run. This event is held annually around June or July each year. The event starts at Freshwater Park Strathfield, with a 5 km and 10 km run, a 5 km walk and 2 km kids' run. The 2026 run was staged on 28 June.

== Gallery ==
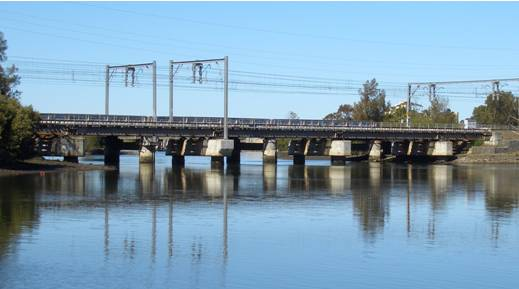
Cooks River, railway bridge between Tempe and Wolli Creek

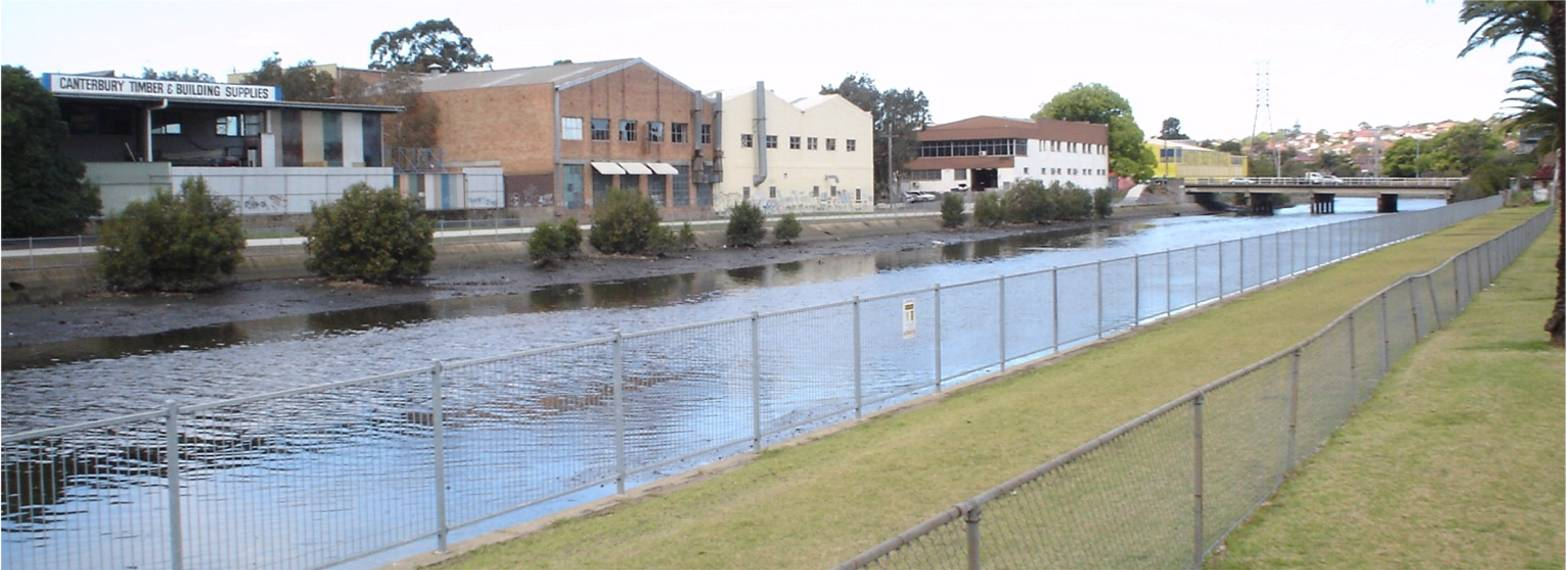
Industrial areas along the Cooks River at Canterbury

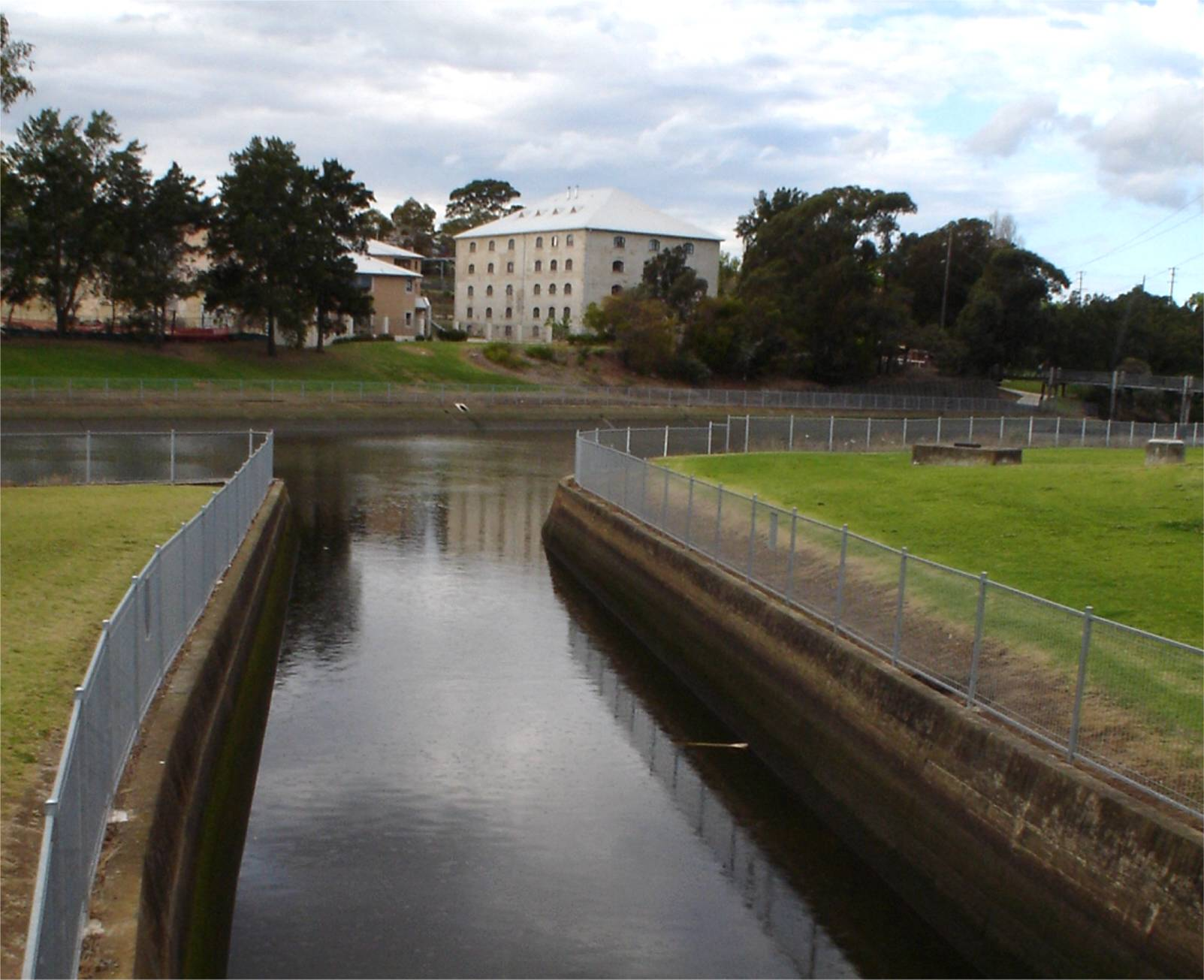
Cooks River joined by Cup and Saucer Creek

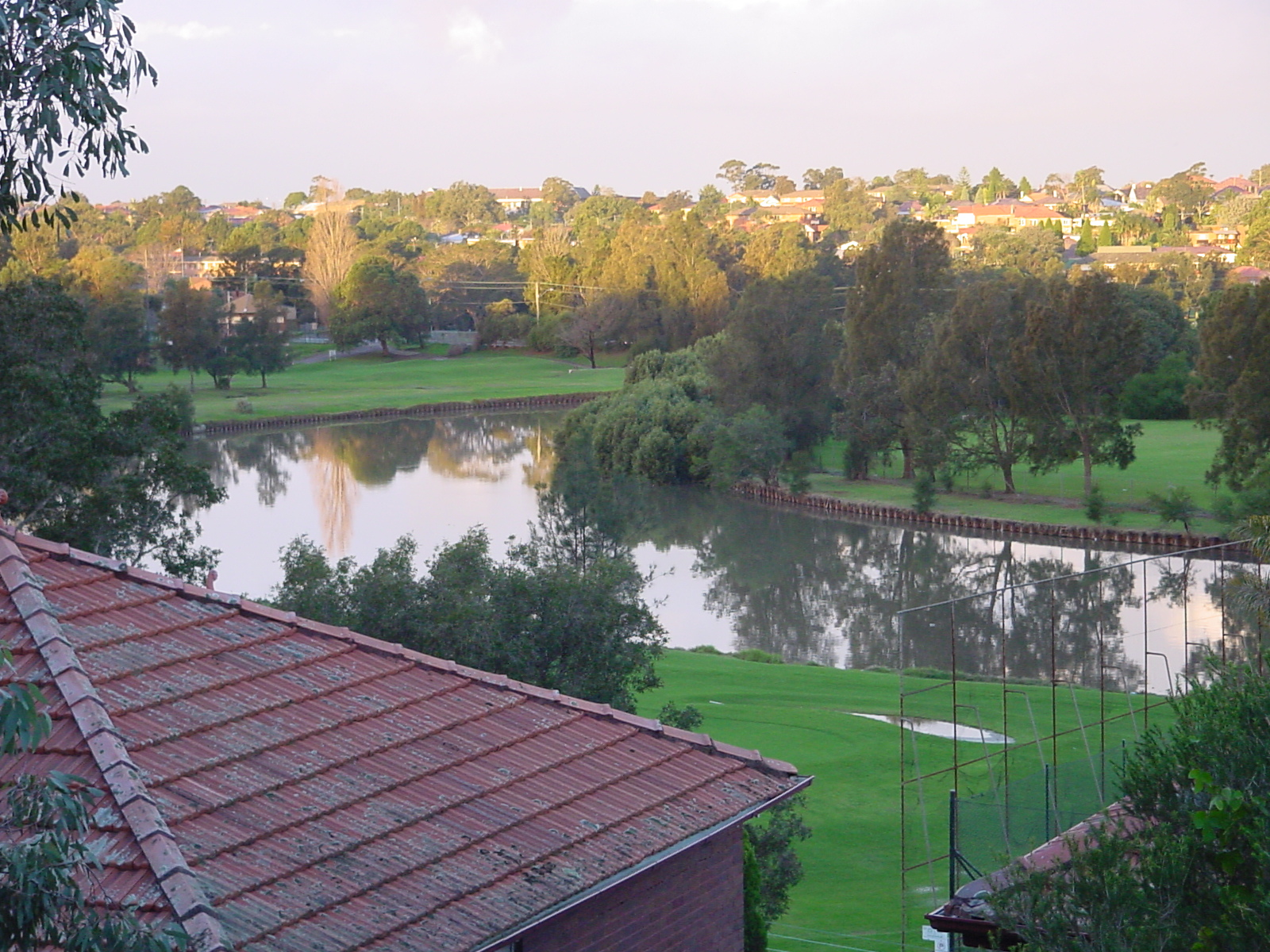
Cooks River at Hurlstone Park

== See also ==
- List of rivers in Australia
- List of rivers in New South Wales (A-K)
- Rivers of New South Wales
- Cooks River/Castlereagh Ironbark ecological community
- Cooks River cycleway
- Cooks River Sewage Aqueduct
