= Wolli Creek, New South Wales =

Wolli Creek
- Suburb
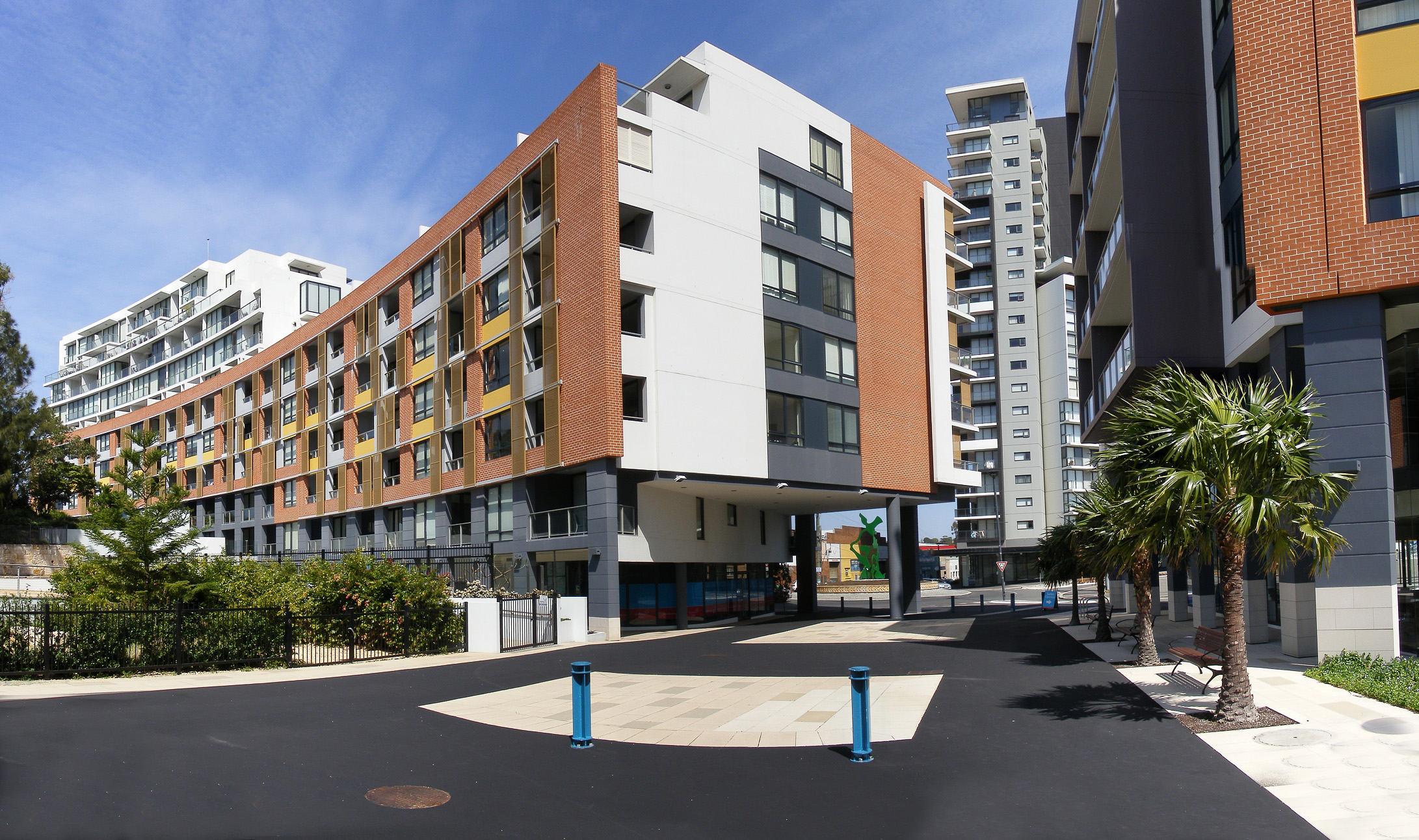
- Apartments on Brodie Spark Drive

- Interactive map of Wolli Creek
- Country: Australia
- State: New South Wales
- City: Sydney
- LGA: Bayside
- Location: 10 km (6.2 mi) south of Sydney CBD
- Established: 2002

Government
  - State electorate: Rockdale
  - Federal division: Barton
- Elevation: 5 m (16 ft)

Population
  - Total: 10,654 (2021 census)
- Postcode: 2205
Suburbs around Wolli Creek
Earlwood	Tempe	Tempe
Turrella	Wolli Creek	Sydney Airport
Turrella	Arncliffe	Arncliffe

Wolli Creek (formerly known as North Arncliffe) is a suburb in southern Sydney, in the state of New South Wales, Australia. It sits beside the Wolli Creek and Cooks River waterways. Wolli Creek is situated between the suburbs of Arncliffe and Tempe, 10 kilometres south of the Sydney central business district and is part of the St George area. Wolli Creek is in the local government area of Bayside Council.

== History ==
The traditional owners of the land around the Wolli Creek Valley were the Bidjigal people (River Flat Clan) of the Eora Nation.

Wolli Creek was named after the waterway on its northern border.

The suburb was previously part of Arncliffe. Reuben Hannam was granted land in 1825 on the banks of Cooks river. Alexander Brodie Spark purchased land in 1826 and built Tempe house in 1836. It was named after 'Vale of Tempe', a beautiful valley in ancient Greek legend set at the foot of Mount Olympus. Tempe House, designed by John Verge, has a Georgian feel and is regarded as one of the great houses of Sydney.

Philanthropist Caroline Chisholm leased Tempe House as a boarding school for young women (1863–1865). The estate was known as Greenbank during this time and presented an ideal location for Chisholm's work. She remarked on the spacious and lofty rooms and the 'fine large and open orchard of fruit trees, intersected by wide and shady walks'.

In 1884, the estate was sold to the Sisters of the Good Samaritan for use as a charitable refuge for women. The Sisters added the impressive St Magdalen's Chapel (1888), which is believed to be the work of Sheerin & Hennessy, an important firm of Sydney architects, who designed the Archbishop's Residence and St Patrick's College at Manly. The neo-Gothic style Chapel is of major cultural significance. It is now deconsecrated and has been restored as part of the Discovery Point redevelopment. Tempe House is now listed on the Register of the National Estate.

The area became predominantly industrial until a redevelopment was planned in the late 1990s. The new suburb was to be called North Arncliffe, but residents in the area petitioned the council to conduct a vote to select a better name. Wolli Creek was the most popular choice. Wolli Creek railway station opened in 2000. Wolli Creek was officially declared a suburb in 2002.

== Heritage listings ==
Wolli Creek has a number of heritage-listed sites, including:

- 1 Princes Highway: Tempe House and St Magdalenes Chapel

== Commercial/Retail area ==
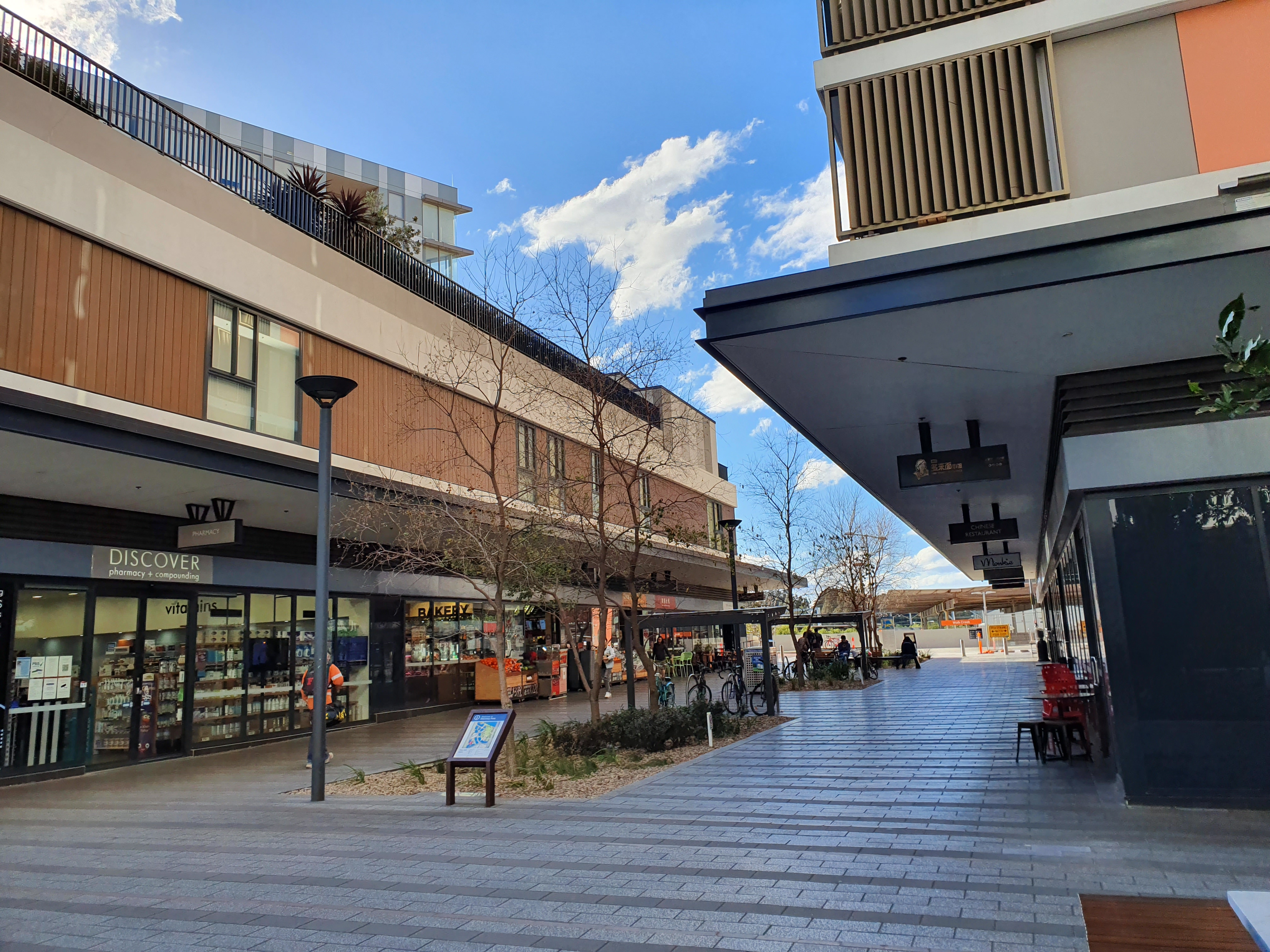
Restaurants and shops in the Village Square

Once industrial, Wolli Creek was redeveloped in the 2010s into a high-density residential and commercial area. Close proximity to the Sydney CBD and Sydney Airport, and well connected public transport services, along with the expansive parkland and attractive riverside setting, make it a popular residential location.

The main retail precinct is the Village Square, which is directly opposite the Wolli Creek station entrance and contains a wide array of restaurants and cafés, a pharmacy, barber and other shops.

Wolli Creek is home to two hotels: Novotel Sydney International Airport and CKS Sydney Airport Hotel.

== Demographics ==
At the 2021 census, Wolli Creek had a population of 10,654, up from 6,394 in 2016. Compared to the national average of 14.3%, 46.7% of the population were aged between the ages of 25 and 34. The most common countries of birth were: Australia (23.1%), China (20.2%), Mongolia (4.8%), Indonesia (4.3%), Colombia (4.0%) and Brazil (3.7%). English at home, was spoken by only 25.9% of people. Other languages spoken at home included Mandarin 21.7%, Cantonese 6.4%, Spanish 5.1%, Mongolian 4.6% and Indonesian 3.9%. The most common responses for religion were No Religion 47.3%, Catholic 15.1% and Buddhism 10.0%. 98.3% of residences were apartments. The average number of people living in each household was 2.2.

== Transport ==
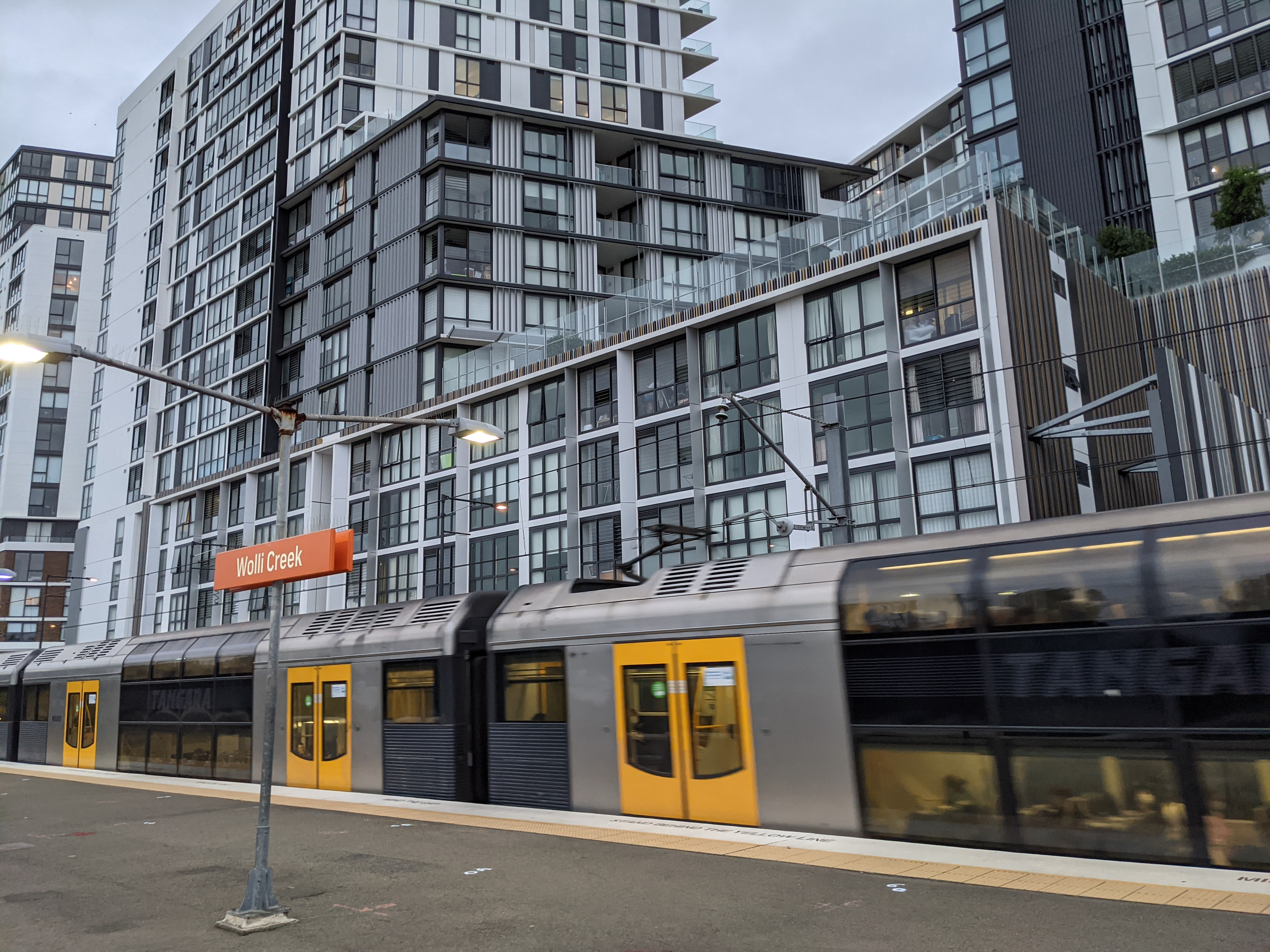
A T4 Illawarra line service at Wolli Creek station

The Princes Highway links Wolli Creek north to Tempe and the Sydney central business district and south to Arncliffe and Rockdale. The M5 South Western Motorway, with entrances and exits at nearby Arncliffe, runs south-west towards Liverpool and north-east towards Botany and the city.

Wolli Creek railway station is a railway hub and connects to the Illawarra line and Airport & South Line on the Sydney Trains network.

The 348 bus route operates from Wolli Creek station to Prince of Wales Hospital via Tempe, St Peters, Kensington and the University of New South Wales. The 422 bus route travels from Kogarah to Wolli Creek, then continues to Railway Square.

== Recreational facilities ==
Cahill Park is located along the Princes Highway and Gertrude Street, fronting the Cooks River. Facilities offered include playground equipment, electrical barbecues and sporting fields for cricket and rugby. Tennis courts are also located adjacent to Cahill Park. Discovery Point Park is a privately owned park, which is open to the public, located along the Princes Highway and Brodie Sparks Drive. Discovery Point Park offers over three hectares of landscaped waterfront parklands, with provisions for walking and cycling. Other recreation facilities include Kogarah Golf Course, located along Marsh Street and the St George Rowing Club, on Levey Street. Wolli Creek Regional Park has bushwalking tracks and barbecuing facilities.

== Gallery ==
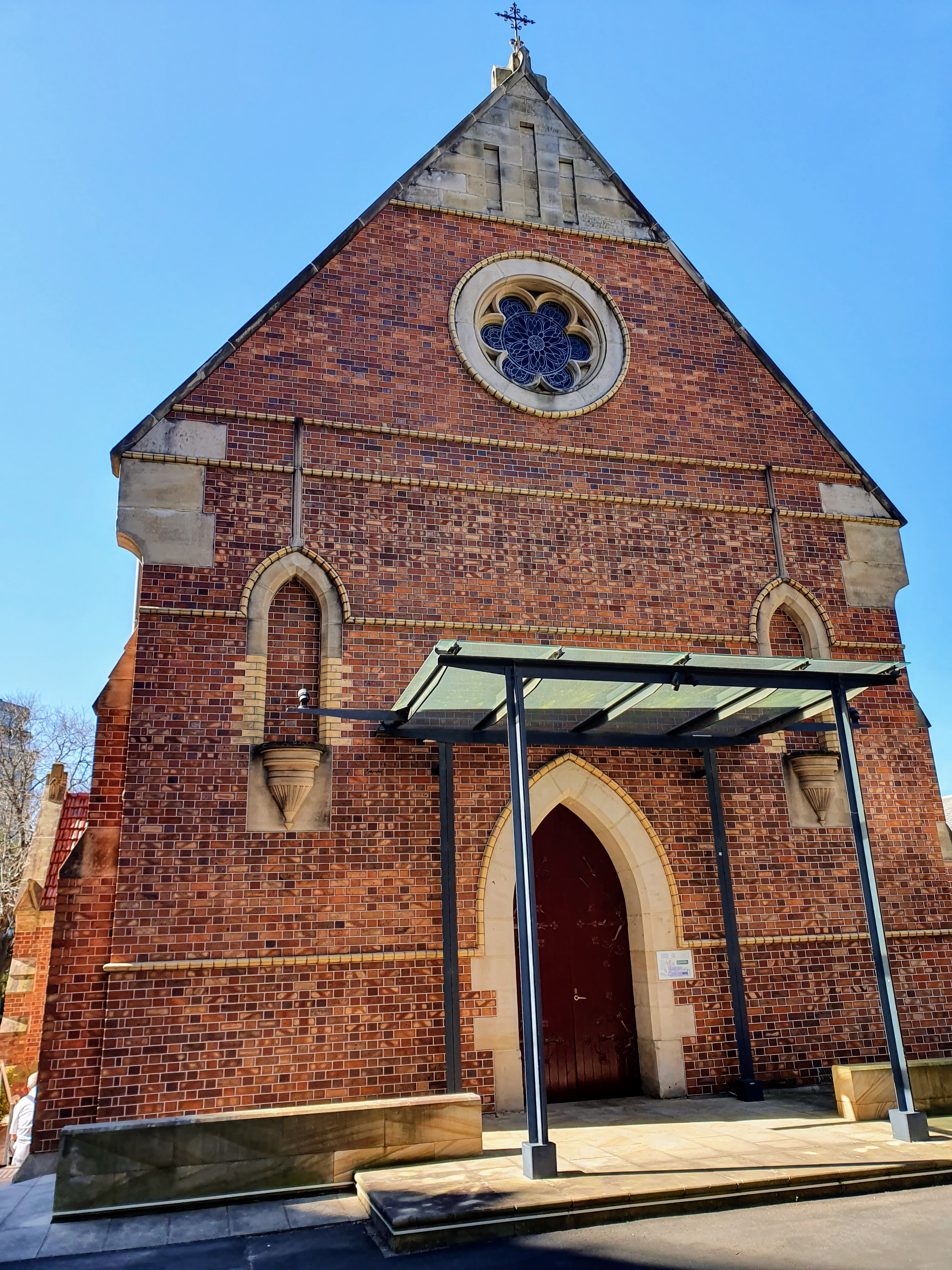
St Magdalene's Chapel

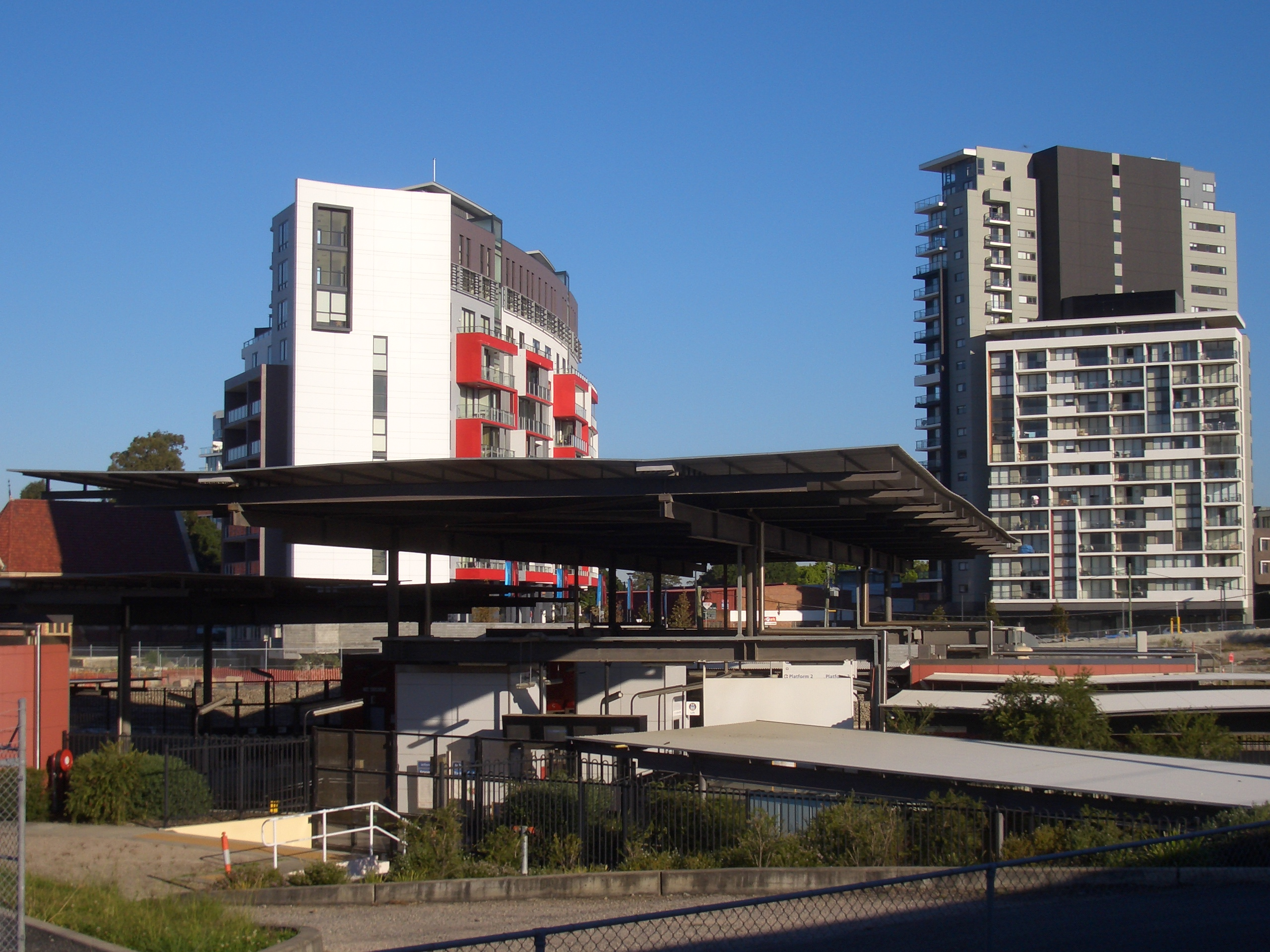
Wolli Creek station and apartments

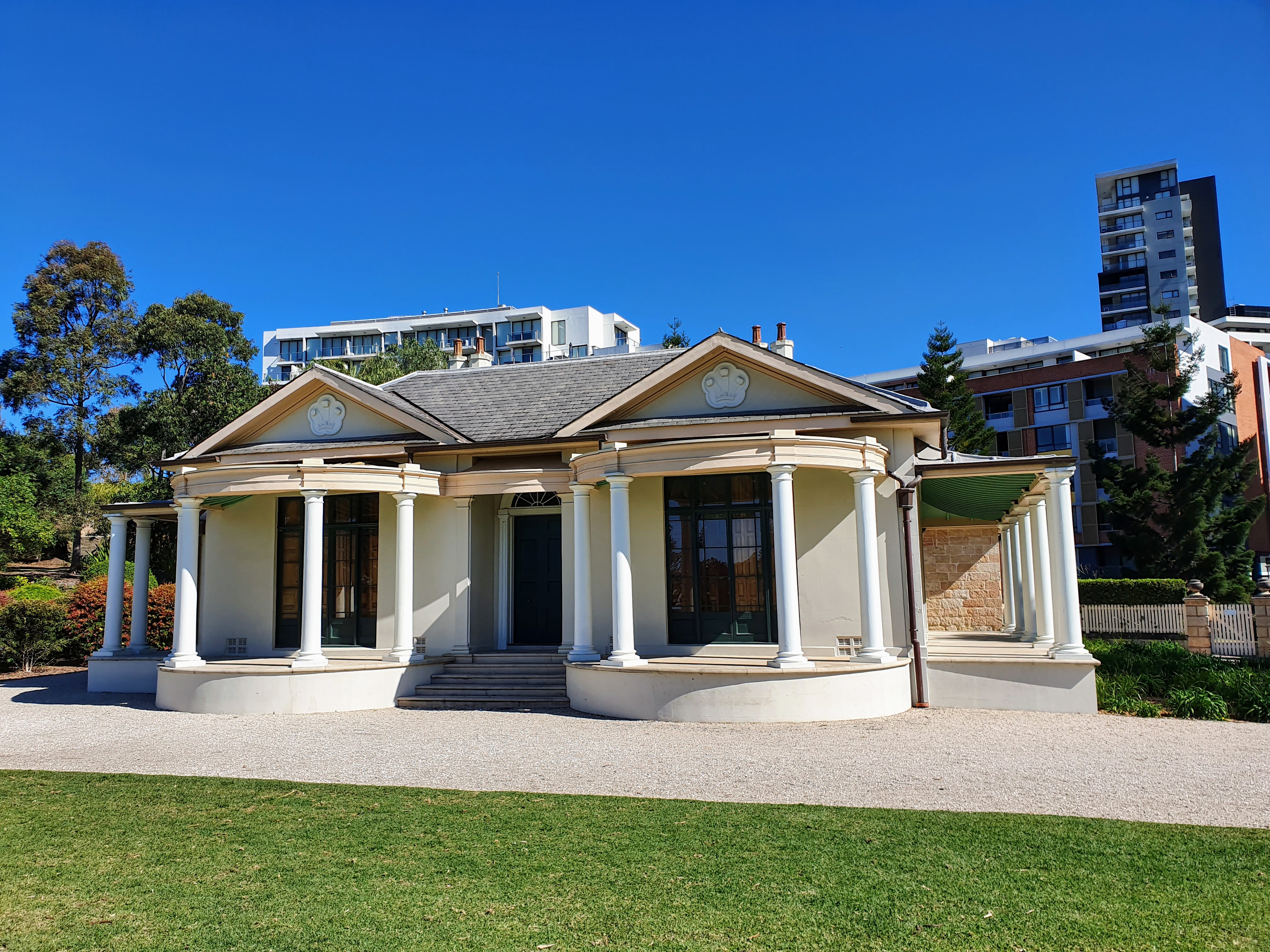
Tempe House in 2019

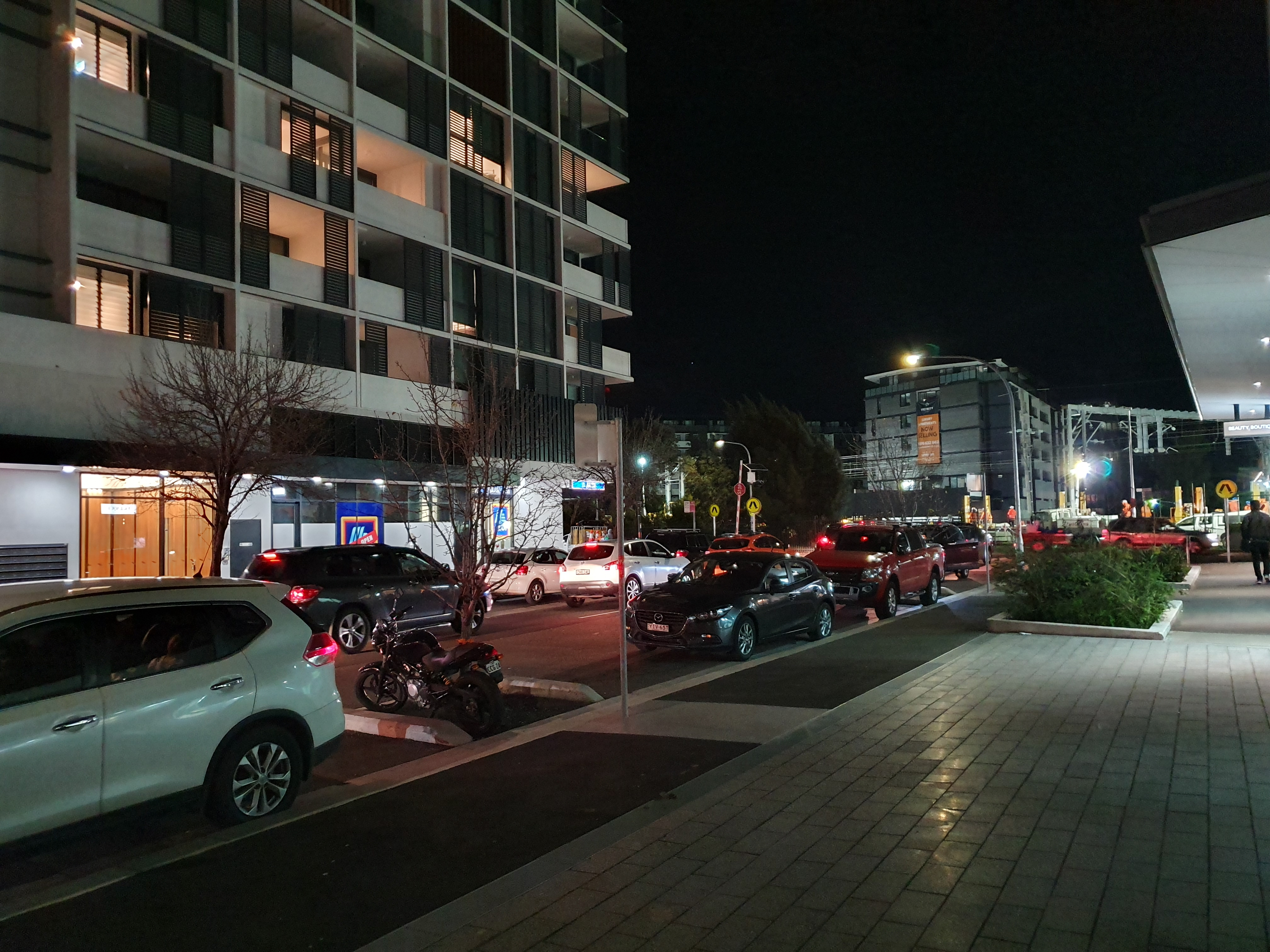
Shops and Residential Complex on Magdalene Terrace
