= St Peters Church, St Peters =

Church in St Peters, Sydney, Australia

St Peter's Church, St Peters
- St Peter's Anglican Church, St Peters
- St Peter's Church, Cooks River
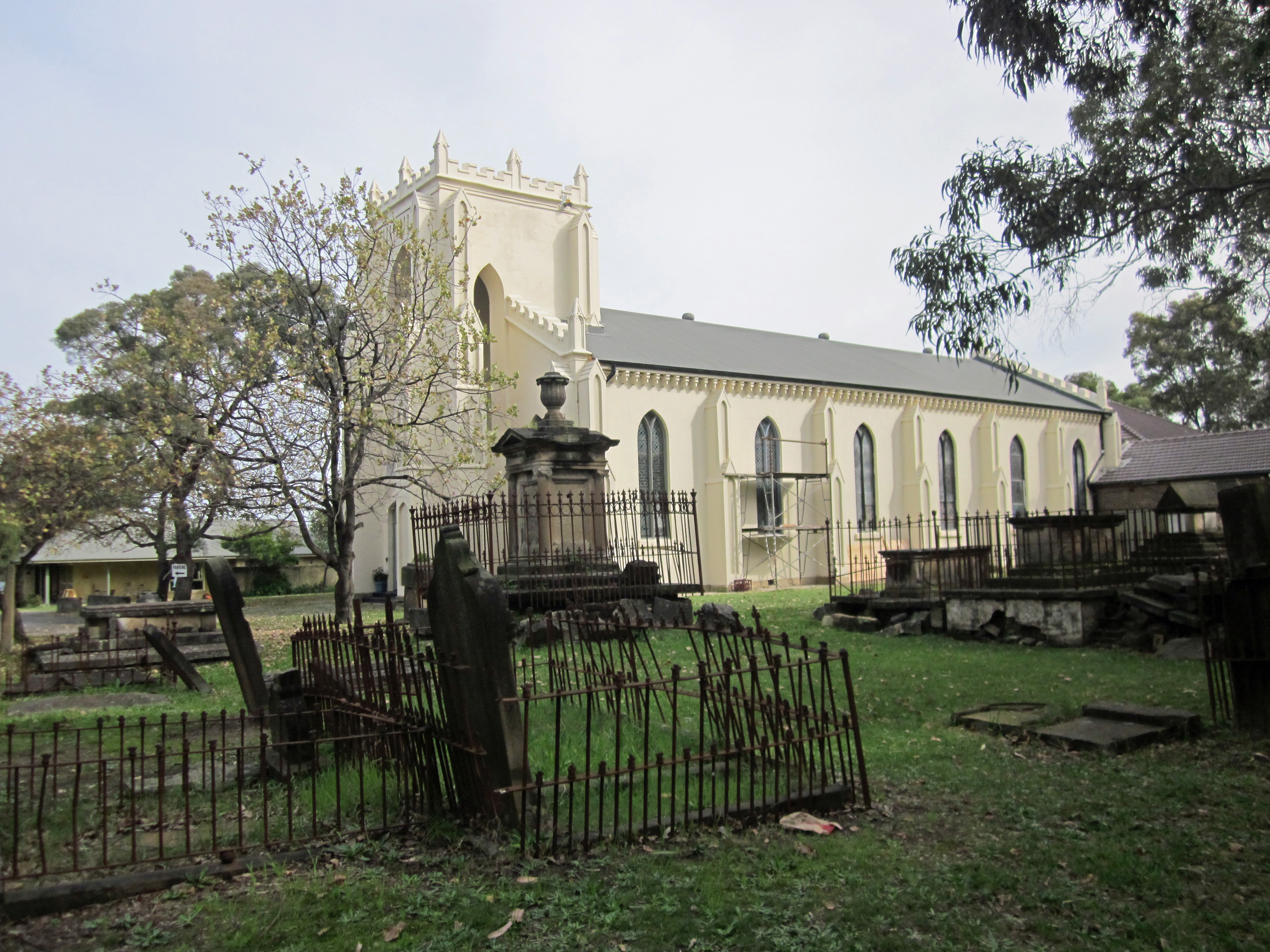
- St Peter's Church and cemetery. The spire and bell chamber were removed in 1963.
- St Peter's Church, St Peters
- 33°54′50″S 151°10′37″E
- Location: 187-209 Princes Highway, St Peters, New South Wales
- Country: Australia
- Denomination: Anglican
- Website: stpeterschurch.com.au

History
- Status: Church
- Founded: 13 July 1838
- Founder: Alexander Brodie Spark
- Dedication: Saint Peter
- Consecrated: 26 December 1840

Architecture
- Functional status: Active
- Architects: John Bibb; Edmund Blacket
- Architectural type: Church
- Style: Old Colonial Gothick Picturesque
- Groundbreaking: 7 July 1838
- Completed: November 1839

Administration
- Province: New South Wales
- Diocese: Sydney
- Parish: Cooks River
Cooks River Cemetery
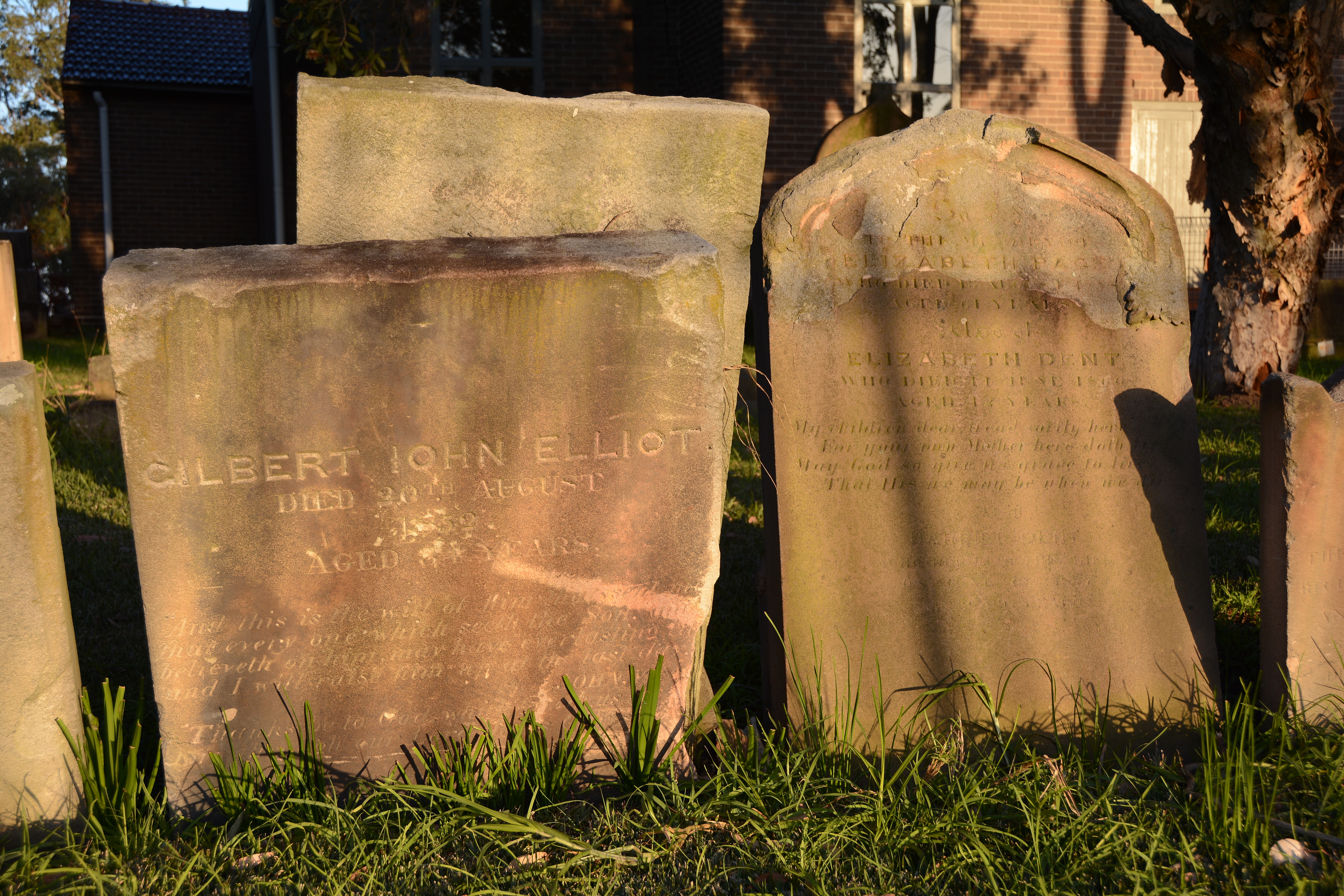
- Gravestones in the cemetery
Details
- Established: 1839
- Location: adjacent
- Owned by: St Peters Anglican
- No. of interments: 2500
- Find a Grave: Cooks River Cemetery
- yes

New South Wales Heritage Register
- Official name: St Peter's Anglican Church; St Peter's Church of England
- Type: State heritage (complex / group)
- Designated: 2 April 1999
- Reference no.: 00032
- Type: Church
- Category: Religion
- Builders: Henry Knight

St Peter's Anglican Church is a heritage-listed Anglican church located at 187-209 Princes Highway in St Peters, New South Wales, Australia. It is one of the oldest churches in Sydney. Designed by Thomas Bird, the church is sometimes referred to as St Peter's Church, Cooks River, as it is located in the Anglican Parish of Cooks River, New South Wales. The church is listed on the NSW State Heritage Register and on the (now defunct) Register of the National Estate.

The Cooks River, named by James Cook in 1770 when he sailed into Botany Bay, is crossed by the Princes Highway, about 3 kilometres (1.9 mi) to the south of the church. The suburb of St Peters, in which the church is located, was named as a result of the area's proximity to the church.

== History ==
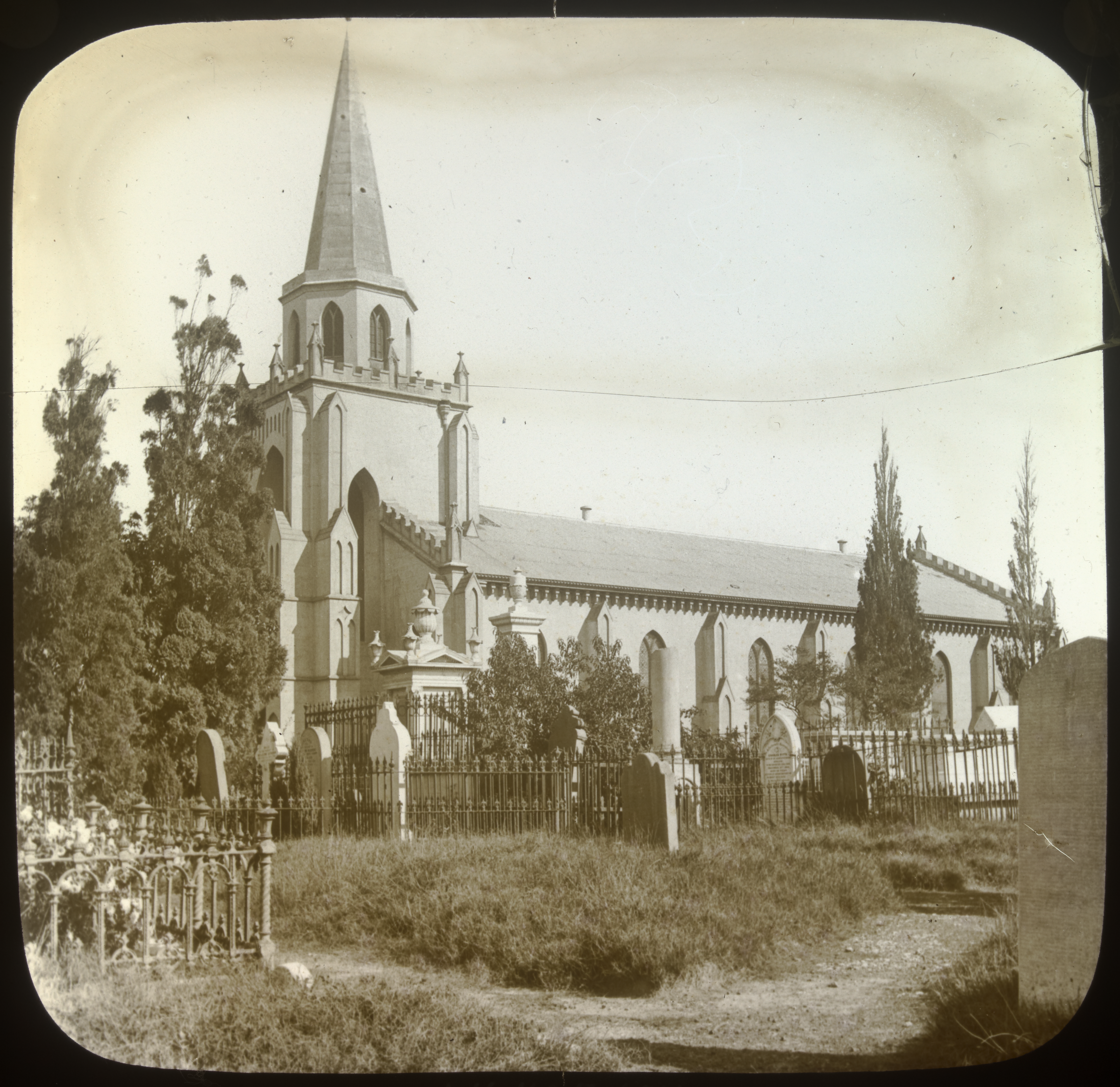
St Peters Church photographed by John Henry Harvey sometime before 1938

=== Aboriginal occupation ===
The church site forms part of the core of the territory of the Darug Coastal Nation. The geological formation of the study area is described as part of the Wianamatta Group and chiefly Ashfield Shale resulting in clay soils supporting an indigenous forest vegetation structure dominated by Turpentine and Ironbark tree association.

=== Early colonial land grants and settlement (1799–1826) ===
The church site forms part of the land granted to Thomas Smyth in 1799 following the colonial invasion of the east coast of New South Wales. Lands including the study area were acquired by Robert Campbell and the original grant was referred to as Bulanaming was subdivided and 6 acres 14 perch, on the higher ground on the low ridge between Gumbramorra Creek to the north west and Shea's Creek to the south east, were reserved for the erection of a church. Much of the indigenous forest was cleared to obtain timber and get access to the relatively fertile soils for agricultural pursuits. This resulted in an open landscape character with scattered remnant trees.

=== Alexander Brodie Spark (1826–1838) ===
Thirteen of the forty two allotments of Campbell's subdivision were purchased by Alexander Brodie Spark along with three smaller grants on the southern side of the Cooks River in 1826. Spark was an established Sydney merchant, a leading member of the community and a considerable land speculator holding land at the Glebe, Potts Point and the Hunter Valley besides his Cooks River land. Spark was a classically educated man and this possibly influenced his decision to name his major Cooks River property "Tempe" after the Vale of Tempe, a beautiful valley in ancient Greek legend which lay at the foot of Mount Olympus. Spark employed architect John Verge to design his Tempe house. He had previously (1831) employed Verge to design "Tusculum" on Woolloomooloo Hill (Potts Point) but apparently preferred the Cooks River property by moving to the Tempe estate in 1833 to oversee the implementation of the new residence and its picturesque garden setting. Spark and his estate played a key role in the establishment of a community at St Peters and in the building of the St Peter's Anglican Church.

Spark was one of the original trustees of St. Peter's Anglican Church, St Peters. When Spark died he was buried in St. Peter's graveyard. The location of the grave is uncertain.

=== Construction and early years (1838–1864) ===
The Cooks River area was popular as a location for well-to-do estates from the mid-1800s onwards. It was not until the 1880s that the Cooks River area was closely settled. The church site comprising 6 acres 14 perches was transferred by Campbell, in December 1837, to the "Bishop of Australia" for the erection of the church.

Spark, as the largest landowner in Campbell's subdivision, was highly active in the local community and was involved in business dealings with many of his neighbours including John Lord who was his co-director of the Bank of Australia. Bishop Broughton proceeded to establish the church and tenders were called for the erection of the church appearing on 16 March 1838 to the designs of the architect Thomas Bird.

Spark may have been influential in the selection of the architect who had worked with him on another project (the Sydney Exchange Building) and had engaged Bird to work on improvements to his residence "Tempe" in April 1839. Spark was elected as one of the five trustees as elected on 16 April 1838. The other trustees were; The Lord Bishop of Australia, Robert Campbell, John Lord and David Chambers. A temporary church was constructed of ironbark slabs on a stone foundation on the land dedicated by Campbell, and intended, as a permanent church site, to the north of the site of the intended permanent structure. This was opened 13 May 1838.

A foundation stone was laid on 13 July 1838 and the church licensed on 20 November 1839. Spark hosted the celebrations for the licensing and afterwards at his residence Tempe House. The church was described at the time of the licensing that ; "it was a handsome building in the Gothic style" and "the church is surrounded by a handsome railing, has a steeple, spire etc." The contractor was Henry Knight of Macdonaldtown.

Spark appeared the major agitator for the church as he had approached the Governor to gain additional funds for the church and a parsonage. In his diary Spark records the acquisition of a Seraphin (organ), font and Communion Service.

The building was constructed of sun dried bricks, ironbark internal columns ( from nearby Gannon's Forest), plaster vaulted ceiling and imported stained glass windows from England. The church footprint measured 90 feet by 35 feet and fronted the main road, Cook's River Road (now Princes Highway). The bricks were made by Henry Knight, who ran a steam brick-making machine in the 1840s. He was responsible for the first practical experiment in the field of individual home ownership for the working population. He subdivided his land at Macdonaldtown and sold it for 1 pound per foot on long terms, free of interest. In 1872 he was elected to the first Council of the borough of Macdonaldtown (later Erskineville) and became Mayor.

The parsonage was a single storey verandahed structure located behind the church and towards the south west and apparently had a timber shingled roof (probably local Casuarina glauca shingles). The graveyard was enclosed by a curving picket fence in between the church and the main road to the south east corner. It was consecrated on 26 December 1840 with the first burial taking place in 1839. Gates to the burial ground were repaired in 1841 and the painted fencing completed in 1845. Further repairs to the fencing were carried out in 1848 and 1852.

All of these built facilities underwent change in this period with the parsonage undergoing works in the form of a new well and an extension of the chimney in 1841 and a building survey was conducted in 1843. Repairs were carried out in 1847 and 1849. Additions were made to the parsonage in the 1860s when Reverend King was in occupation and these appear to have been prepared by the architect John Bibb in 1855. Bibb was requested to prepare an estimate for repairs to the parsonage and a plan for a Schoolmaster's residence which was completed in 1856.

The extent of the works is unclear; however the Vestry Minutes give some explanation with the addition of outbuildings (stables) in 1862 and two wooden rooms added to the parsonage together with painting and plumbing works in 1865. The western wall of the Church now has stone buttresses on either side of the main entrance and these may date from this period involving the advice of the Sydney architects, Edmund Blacket, James Hume and Henry Robertson. The architectural details of these buttresses are different from the others dating to the original construction of the church.

St Peters Church watercolour c1940-1850. Mitchell Library

The work appears to be that of Edmund Blacket as the appointment of Hume or Robertson was ruled out due to their negative assessment of the condition of the Church. The main church building fabric was impacted by white ants (termites), a lack of sub-floor ventilation and poor drainage and was described as dilapidated. James Hume recommended the demolition of the building and another built alongside the existing building. This was not an option so Edmund Blacket was appointed to carry out repairs, and according to the Vestry Minutes, he prepared specifications for stone and brickwork with the repairs completed in 1847.

Within the church, internal columns were replaced, due to damage by white ant activity, and the western wall propped up due to its detachment from the body of the building in 1846.

By 1851 further repair work was carried out to infill openings in the walls of the church and by 1863 a suggestion made for the inclusion of a gallery in the church. A day school was established in 1848 following the acquisition of a school allotment in 1847, its fencing and building a schoolhouse in 1855, and a schoolmaster's residence in 1856. The school continued to hold the denominational school of St Peter's Church until 1880–1881 when it merged with the present public school.

=== 1865–1906 ===
In this period the graveyard was extended by 1868 with a further extension in 1874 and ultimately the last burial took place in 1896. Also by 1868 the Cooks River Road frontage was defined by a dwarf stone wall, timber paling and rail fence with centrally located gates together with a northern gate (built 1865). In 1864 a new gallery was completed for the west end of the church building to accommodate the growing needs of the congregation, and in 1865 an addition to the parsonage saw symmetrical gabled wing buildings attached to the earlier structure. In 1866 (29 May) and in 1867 (5 July) plants were sent from the Sydney Botanic Gardens for the then rector the Reverend George King for use within the grounds and to improve the landscape setting of both the church and the adapted parsonage complex.

In 1869 the architect George Allen Mansfield was employed to prepare a report on the repairs needed to the church roof. Mansfield also recommended the replacement of the existing render to the walls with cement. In 1870 Mansfield was advised to call for tenders for the following works: removal of plaster and walls to be cemented, pillars marbled, ceiling whitewashed, door painted inside and out and the exterior of the building to be coloured.

Due to a response to the poor condition of the church the architect Edmund Blacket was employed again during the mid-1870s and 1880s. This resulted in extensive alterations including; provision of a chancel at the eastern end of the church, replacement of pews, new communion rails, new font and replacement of stained glass windows. In 1880 a pipe organ made by Brindley & Foster of Sheffield, England, was installed in the gallery of the church. Further works were carried out under the instruction of Blacket. Edmund Blacket died in February 1883 and his son, Cyril, continued the architectural practice. Blacket Brothers Architects were employed as early as 1870 to carry out repairs to the tower of the church.

William Francis Boulton Uzzell was incumbent of St. Peter's Church. Uzzell was ordained by Bishop Barker in 1864. In 1879 he became the first Moore College graduate to become rector of St. Peter's Church, Cooks River. Born in Devon in 1834 he was son of William Uzzell, toll keeper and Cecilia Boulton. In 1867 he married Frances Langley, sister of the Revds. John Douse and Henry Archdell Langley. During Uzzell's six year ministry at St. Peter's, major work was done on the building, including the pipe organ and Blacket works

=== 1906–1928 ===
The 1906-1913 period is characterised by the demolition of the original parsonage (with the possible exception of some of the outbuildings, including former stables) and the erection of a new building adjacent to the earlier one and to the south. The architectural style of the new building is consistent with the fashions of the Federation period.

In 1913 the church land was subdivided due to the resumption of three acres and one rood to the north west for the purposes of creating land for the St Peters Primary School. In 1916 the iron roof of the church was replaced with slate, repairs carried out to windows and ceiling and electric lights installed. Repairs were also made to the graveyard. A portion of land fronting the Princes Highway was lost due to road widening in 1927 which resulted in the relocation of graves and the construction of a recycled sandstone retaining wall and bull nosed brick dwarf wall. The Vestry minutes indicate that 12 metres (40 ft) was taken off the property.

=== 1928–1932 ===
A tennis court was constructed on the south side of the church and in front of the Parsonage. In 1928 a kindergarten hall was commenced directly behind the church. It appears that excavations were commenced in an area adjacent to the tennis court but eventually the hall was located to the rear of the church and to the design of architect Leslie Wilkinson. The 1930 aerial photograph indicates a central square hall structure located symmetrically to the western entrance of the church. This may have been a temporary structure until the implementation of the final hall complex in brickwork during 1932–1934. Further contemporary photographic evidence, thought to be of the laying of the foundation stone for the new hall, indicates the temporary hall as a pyramidal formed building clad in corrugated iron being encased by the present brick structure. This structure was known as the Kindergarten Hut. It was designed and drawn up by Mr Cullingham who was also the working director for its implementation. Assistance was given by Messrs Stanley, Bland, Smith, Robins and Dick.

=== 1932–1963 ===
Wilkinson's hall was completed during 1932 which had a great physical and visual impact on the composition of the original church building. The other major impact to the original design composition was the removal of the spire of the church and bell chamber in 1963. Alternative methods for the reconstruction of the steeple were suggested by the architect Morton Herman but these were found to be structurally unsound in principle.

Wilkinson's new hall was built by G. Billworth for A£1,030 and was implemented when Wilkinson had become a lay canon to St Andrew's Cathedral, Sydney as well as the President of the Institute of Architects of NSW. He was also of note due to his academic position of professor of architecture and the first chair of architecture at the University of Sydney. An advocate of formal simplicity his buildings were often signified by a decorative fleche. In the case of St Peters Hall the fleche acted as a vent as well as a lantern at the apex of the central roof form. This element has since been removed. In 1934, as part of the celebrations of the 95th anniversary of the laying of the foundation stone a brick walled element was constructed in front of the east end of the church and below a lancet window. It supported a tablet which commemorated Captain James Cook's association with the naming of the river and subsequently the Parish of Cook's River. This was unveiled by Captain C. J. Pope on 7 July 1934. On the same day was the dedication of a flag-mast and the planting of trees within the church grounds by at least thirteen visitors. The wall and tablet are not extant. Also added to the site at this time was a garage, and a man's room.

=== 1963–1996 ===
In 1965 a wayside chapel was established in the eastern end of the church under the tower. In 1976 considerations were made to adapt the graveyard as a park and a Cooks River Cemetery Act was passed to remove the graveyard. This reflected the fashion of the time when other graveyards were turned into recreational park spaces, however the National Trust (NSW) intervened by classifying the church and grounds to ensure the conservation of the graveyard. In 1978 conservation works were proposed by architects Woodhouse and Danks. Works included the removal of external render to repair water damage, carpeting and removal of the pews. Prior to the carpeting the floor finishes comprised a central carpet runner and the margins painted in Japan Black. Also in 1980 damp proof courses were added and the walls rendered.

=== 1996–present ===
In 1996 a new parsonage was built in the southern corner of the grounds partly on the site of the former tennis court and both parsonage buildings fenced with secure metal fencing. In February 2005 site works were carried out to the ground adjacent to the northern wall of the church in an attempt to gain footing stabilisation through control of the moisture levels in the soil. A concrete apron was laid against the junction of the northern wall and the ground with a layer of plastic membrane under the concrete and extending northwards for two metres with soil and grass replaced over the membrane and two parallel drainage lines to feed a gatic pit to the east.

In 1999 the roof of the church was replaced and other repairs made such as ceilings and windows following storm damage, particularly from hail impact. A metal shed acting as a garage and storage space was located to the southern side of the 1906 parsonage.

== Church complex ==
The site contains three main buildings, a remnant graveyard, fencing, concrete, brick and bitumen paving, retaining walls, entry gate piers and road, grassing, small garden areas and tree planting.

The three main buildings are; St Peter's Church and hall, the former 1906 Rectory and the 1996 Rectory. Some archaeological potential is evident on the site of the original Rectory building.

=== Church ===
The 1838 church form has a brick hall (1932–34) complex grafted on to the western end of the church. There is evidence of ongoing adaptation of the original fabric, mostly due to structural instability resulting from the movement of the sandstone footings, on an almost continuous basis since its initial construction.

The 1838 church building is unique in that it is built of sun dried bricks with stuccoed finish forming the walls. The surface of the walls are expressed to simulate stonework and have attached buttresses supported on sandstone footings integrated into the sandstone footings of the walls. The two buttresses flanking the western entry point to the church are constructed of stone and are of a different detail to the other buttresses. A set of stone stairs with bull nosed treads gives access at the eastern and western ends of the church. These are integrated into the stone plinth at the base of the walls, part of which is exposed and part of which is buried to form the footings. The vestry door fits within the proportions of the pointed arched window openings and has a single stone step for access to and from the vestry to the southern side of the church. The window sills at the base of the pointed openings is also a sandstone element.

There is evidence of a history of patching the walls with brickwork forming a mosaic of bricks. The non-original brickwork is of an unknown extent but appears to have followed a pattern of rebuilding sections of the wall system where cracking has occurred. Also the original render has been replaced at different times with cement render in an attempt to further stabilise the dynamic nature of the building located on reactive soils of the Wianamatta Group. The Wianamatta Group sediments are generally 100–190 metres deep and comprise stratified layers of shales and mudstones.

The gabled roof form is constructed of timber frame with corrugated iron roof sheeting with ventilators on the ridgeline. Collar ties above the vaulted nave are in poor condition or have broken away from the main roof structure. Some of the rafters have extended by fixing adjacent sister rafters and would appear to indicate the outward movement of the roof system. The movement of the footings laid directly into the clay soils has created cracking to the wall fabric. This is particularly noticeable on the northern wall. The architectural composition of the form of the church is a symmetrical one with an emphasis on vertical openings, pointed arches, windows and recessed lancet mouldings surmounted with crenellated parapets to the bell tower and along the upper section of the sloping gables with terminating finials. A large central bell tower niche with pointed arches is a major architectural element of the eastern elevation of the church. One which was once terminated by a spire. The internal spaces consist a central nave with vaulted painted plaster ceilings and side aisles with flat painted plaster ceilings consisting ribbed joints and grided panels with centrally located quadrifid shaped vents set in painted timber panels. Large circular metal vent openings also penetrate the vaulted ceiling of the central nave along the central axis. These may date from the early Twentieth Century. The nave is defined not only by the ceiling treatments but by the two rows of timber columns which were gained locally from Ironbark trees from Gannon's Forest closer to the Cooks River. The existing columns are replacements as the original columns were partly eaten by white ants and were replaced in 1846 as was the floor. The columns are painted and have the names of the Bishops and clergy who were identified with the church painted just below the capital of the columns. The span of the nave also aligns with the original bell tower width at the eastern end of the church which has been modified to accommodate more direct access from the main road. A Chancel and the original Vestry space are accessed from a door on the southern side of the church and adjacent to the bell tower. At the eastern end a Cypress Pine floor is raised from the remainder of the church with both floor levels covered with carpet. At the western end an upper gallery exists and an entry space at the lower level complete with wooden screen, doors and access stair to the stepped upper floor of the Gallery. In the centre of the Gallery is located the Brindley and Foster pipe organ whose installation dates from 1880. Fixed pews are arranged on the stepped levels of the Gallery on the southern side of the organ and angled to obtain views into the main body of the church. The flooring of the Gallery appears to be Baltic Pine.

The pointed window openings contain stained glass compositions and are commemorative of local families and individuals associated with the church. The large western window opening has been boarded over and painted to match the internal wall finish of the church.

At the eastern end of the church is the timber panelled screen forming part of the chancel and separate lectern. A font is located in the north western corner of the main body of the church The internal walls are stuccoed and a painted dado line struck at the level of the window sills. The dado is painted in a contrasting colour and a similar treatment applies to the base of the freestanding and attached columns as well as following the line of the stairs up to the Gallery level. The wall surface is cracked in many places and to varying degrees however most appear to be on the northern wall. The walls also support many inscriptions in the form of various shaped panels and one built in is the original 1838 foundation stone which has been clearly adapted for commemoration in July 1947 following its rediscovery in February 1947. The original main entry to the church at the western end has been obscured by the addition of the Hall (1932–34) as designed by Professor Leslie Wilkinson. This was built around an existing temporary hall which may have influenced the siting of the permanent structure. The Hall is a complex of a central squared symmetrical space with a fireplace on the eastern wall located on axis with the church together with linked ancillary spaces to the north and south. The northern space was intended as a stage while the southern space appears for the use of games. The symmetrical composition breaks down with the additional yet separate spaces of entry, Vestry, Kitchen, toilets and northern ancillary space off the stage. The Kitchen may have been added later. A further entry space is created between the Hall complex and the main western entrance into the church. The construction is of exposed brickwork and timber framed roof with tiled roof on the central hall and gabled wings and corrugated iron over the other separately expressed functions in the spirit of the Modernist movement. A timber floor links all of the internal spaces with a door from the stage area opening to the Creche room. The windows are timber framed, painted and set into internal rendered reveals with no external window sill. Where end wall brickwork is exposed the surface is rendered and unpainted with the exception of the kitchen. With the exception of the central hall space the walls are flush with the roof and the lack of weather protection has resulted in deterioration of the window frames externally. Cracking of the brickwork is evident in this structure as well as the church. The internal exposed brickwork of the central hall is distinguished from the other spaces by the use of a regular pattern of header courses running around the room. The header coursing in brickwork is used only over window and door openings externally with a projecting band of three brick courses at window height to define the stage area and the games area.

The central hall has doors opening to the graveyard to the west by way of brick steps which leads to a small enclosure defined by roll top mesh fencing. The main entrance to the hall complex and the western end of the church is through a recessed archway designed to imitate the Old Colonial Gothick Picturesque style and located between the south western buttress and last pointed window of the church as well as forming part of the Hall complex. This appears to be constructed out of brickwork, rendered and painted in an attempt to match the church fabric.

=== Rectory ===
To the south are the 1906 Rectory building and associated yard, the 1996 Rectory building and its associated yard. The site of the original Rectory and outbuildings is a potential area of archaeological sensitivity due to the previous finding of brick fabric when excavations were made to connect services to a Pollution Sensor located within the fenced yard of the 1906 Rectory.

The 1906 Rectory is representative of the Federation Period and appears to be relatively intact despite the intervention of new fence lines and the pollution sensor. Externally the single-story brick building with complex hip and gable roof forms is sheeted in corrugated iron, displays some restrained patterned brickwork at window sill level complete with inscribed foundation stones built into the wall fabric. Some damaged verandah tile paving is evident together with some displaced slate edging. The traditional window hood is missing over the main window on the eastern gable front, although the line of flashing remains in situ.

=== Hall ===
The hall was designed by Professor Leslie Wilkinson, as confirmed by the original plans which are held by the parish, and an early sketch of its interior.

=== Churchyard ===
The site, which was originally 6 acres and 14 perch ( 2.43 hectares), has been subdivided through resumptions into an irregular shape with frontage to the Princes Highway to the east and Church Street to the north.

The site is fenced along all boundaries except the frontage to Princes Highway which has a sandstone retaining wall which curves symmetrically inwards from the north and south to form the main entrance into the site and to terminate at the relocated row of four entrance pillars which once supported the iron gates which are now not extant. The sandstone wall, which appears to have been constructed from pre used blocks, dates from the 1927 road widening which eliminated 1 rood 28 perch off the original site area. A dwarf brick wall with engaged piers and bull nosed capping surmounted the sandstone retaining wall.

The southern half of the front brick wall is missing as is part of the northern wall. Both north and south components of the front retaining wall are leaning to the east with cracking evident. Also leaning is the stepped rendered brick retaining wall defining the southern alignment of the concrete entrance drive. Both the wall and the drive have extensive cracking due to differential soil movement.

A line of brush box trees (Lophostemon confertus) runs near the boundary fence to the Princes Highway. Photographs of the site up until the 1960s or 1970s showed few trees – one exception being a large Outaniqua or Yellow Wood (Afrocarpus falcatus), a South African coniferous tree near the southern entry to the church. An extensive array of trees was planted in the church yard from the 1960s and 1970s, comprising both exotic English oaks (Quercus robur) forming an avenue on the central axis entry off the Princes Highway towards the church's bell tower, and native trees. Natives include various eucalypts, such as ironbarks (Eucalyptus crebra), lemon-scented gums (Corymbia citriodora), spotted gums (Corymbia maculata) and Sydney blue gums (Eucalyptus saligna), rainforest trees such as brush box. water gum (Tristaniopsis laurina) and Illawarra flame tree (Brachychiton acerifolius).

== Cemetery ==
The first burial in the graveyard, that of John Benfield, a soldier, took place on 4 March 1839, although the graveyard was not consecrated until 26 December 1840. The final burial, that of Sarah Ann Sargent, a widow, took place on 10 April 1896.

In February 1948 an Act of the New South Wales Parliament (Act No. 48 of 1968) was passed authorising the use of the cemetery land for purposes other than a cemetery, including use as a rest park, a garden area and a recreation area. However no action was taken at the time and, in 1979, a permanent conservation order was placed on all of the church property by the Heritage Council of New South Wales.

Since that time the congregation have undertaken voluntary maintenance of the cemetery grounds. A listing of all of the headstones was made in 1985 and photographs have been taken of many of the headstones.

== Heritage listing ==
The St Peter's Church and grounds is of State heritage significance. It contains a rare and early example of Primitive Gothic Revival Church architecture in Australia. It contains a rare surviving work of the Colonial Period architect Thomas Bird (arrived Australia 1835) It contains one of the earliest churches to be constructed as a result of the Religious establishment Act of 1836. It contains evidence of the work and influence of a number of distinguished Australian architects: Thomas Bird, Edmund Blacket, James Hume, John Bibb, George Allen Mansfield, Blacket Brothers, Professor Leslie Wilkinson and Morton Herman. It contains one of the first churches to be constructed of free labour in NSW. It is a landmark within the Sydney environment contained within the greater landscape of Botany Bay. It formed an integral part of Alexander Brodie Spark's vision for an appropriate setting for the village of St Peters, Cooks River c. 1840. St Peter's Church is a unique early form of building construction utilising sun dried bricks and local timber in the form of turpentine columns relating to the indigenous environment of the foreshores of Botany Bay and the Cooks River. The site has social significance due to its continuity of use and importance to the Anglican Church community since its formation in 1838. The site contains graves and remnant grave stones and monuments of significant persons including; A.B Spark, Henry Knight, Elizabeth Knight, Ann Knight, architect John Bibb, Thomas Gratten, James Raymond, grazier Thomas Icely, Susanna Hensley and descendants of Governor King amongst many local pioneers. The site contains a former rectory which is a good representative of the Federation Period with intact details and materials

St Peter's Anglican Church was listed on the New South Wales State Heritage Register on 2 April 1999 having satisfied the following criteria.

The place is important in demonstrating the course, or pattern, of cultural or natural history in New South Wales.

The site, with its landmark church building and graveyard, is an integral part of the former village of St. Peters and village of Tempe, is the derivation of the name of the locale and strongly associated with its identity as a made place. The site has been occupied and used as an Anglican church facility since 1838. The site contains one of the earliest church buildings constructed by free labour and one of the earliest to be constructed as a result of the Religious Establishment Act 1836.

The place has a strong or special association with a person, or group of persons, of importance of cultural or natural history of New South Wales's history.

The church was designed by the Colonial period architect Thomas Bird and the built fabric added to altered by the work of subsequent notable architects: Edmund Blacket and sons, George Allen Mansfield, Professor Leslie Wilkinson and Morton Herman. Repair and reconstruction of damaged building fabric was supported by the congregation often with donations from local brickmakers. The establishment of the church was associated with Robert Campbell and Alexander Brodie Spark, two prominent Sydney Merchants and local landowners. The graveyard contains graves of prominent Sydney people

The place is important in demonstrating aesthetic characteristics and/or a high degree of creative or technical achievement in New South Wales.

The site contains fabric which demonstrates a high degree of creative achievement in the built form of the church, graveyard and Federation Period parsonage. The church is a good example of Old Colonial Gothick Picturesque despite its various additional works throughout the nineteenth century. The 1906 Parsonage is a good example of residential scale of the Arts and Crafts movement of the Federation Period and the graveyard contains a diversity of expression through the monumental tombs and commemorative gravesite markers. Together they form a landmark cultural landscape within the Marrickville municipality.

The place has strong or special association with a particular community or cultural group in New South Wales for social, cultural or spiritual reasons.

The site has local social significance because of its importance to the Church congregation and the community associated with St Peters Church.

The place has potential to yield information that will contribute to an understanding of the cultural or natural history of New South Wales.

The site contains built fabric of a local technical significance for its potential to provide information into early construction methods including the use of sun dried bricks and local timber columns. It also provides good examples of the process of alteration, reconstruction and adaptation and displays an evolution of building and construction techniques. The site contains archaeological potential in the vicinity of the site of the original parsonage building complex.

The place possesses uncommon, rare or endangered aspects of the cultural or natural history of New South Wales.

The site contains items of State significance and the church building has rare surviving fabric of the Old Colonial Gothic Picturesque architectural style and a nineteenth-century graveyard. The remaining original Church form and some of its fabric is the only surviving built form designed by the Colonial Period architect, Thomas Bird, in Australia.

The place is important in demonstrating the principal characteristics of a class of cultural or natural places/environments in New South Wales.

The site has state representative significance because it demonstrates principal characteristics of the work of prominent architects; Thomas Bird, Edmund Blacket, George Allen Mansfield and Professor Leslie Wilkinson.

== Gallery ==
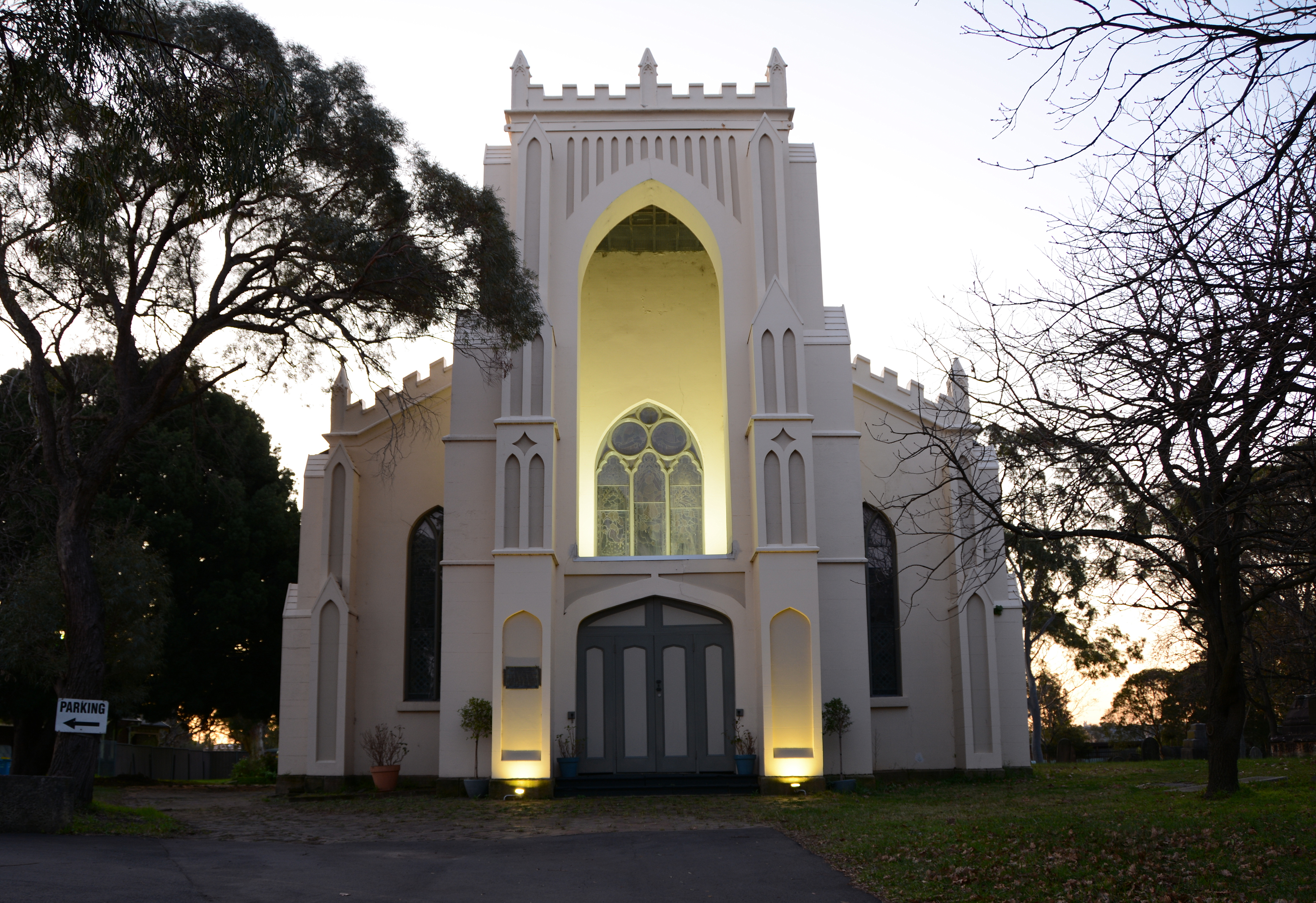
St Peters illuminated at dusk

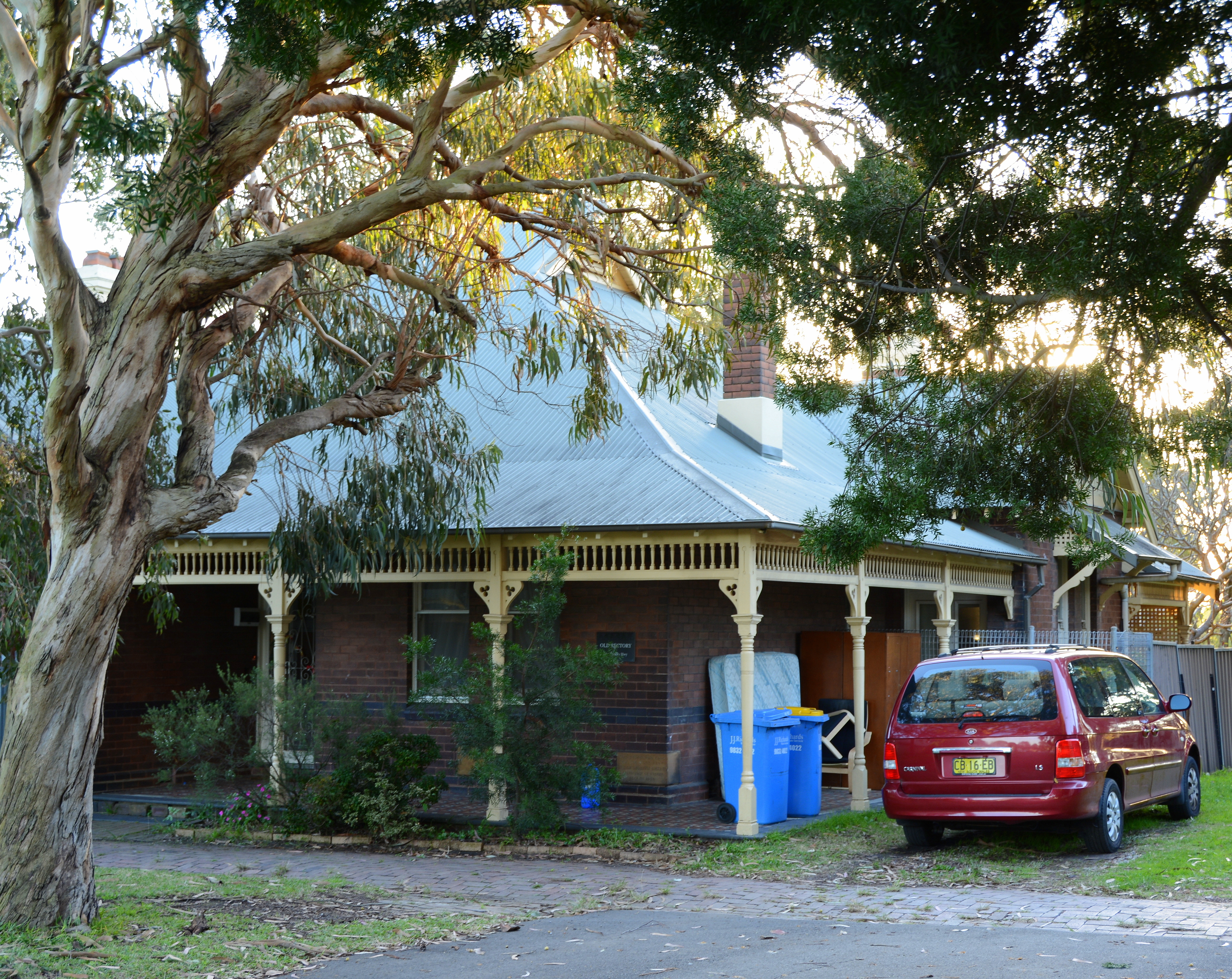
The old rectory, a single-storey Federation home

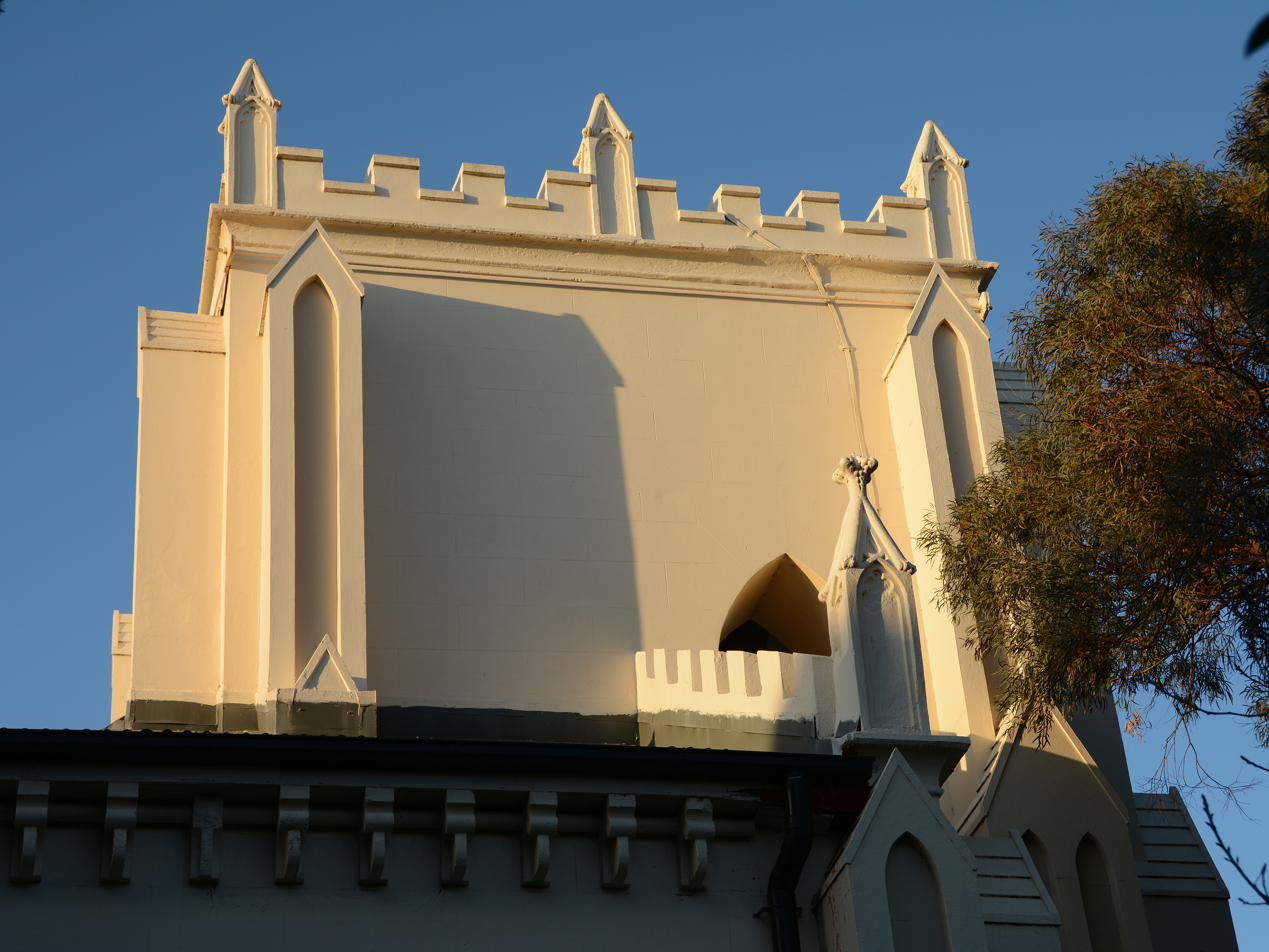
Detail of the church tower

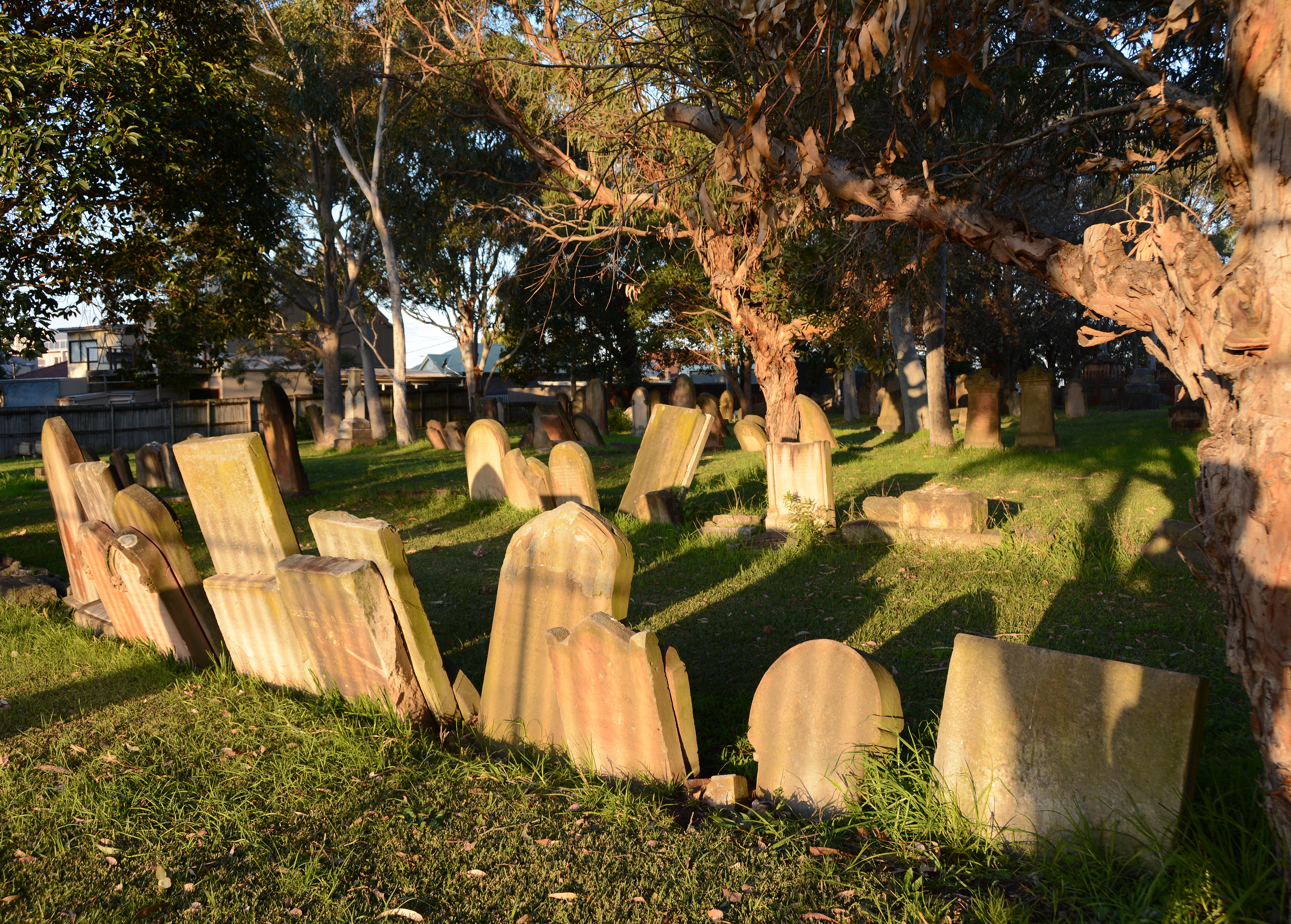
The cemetery

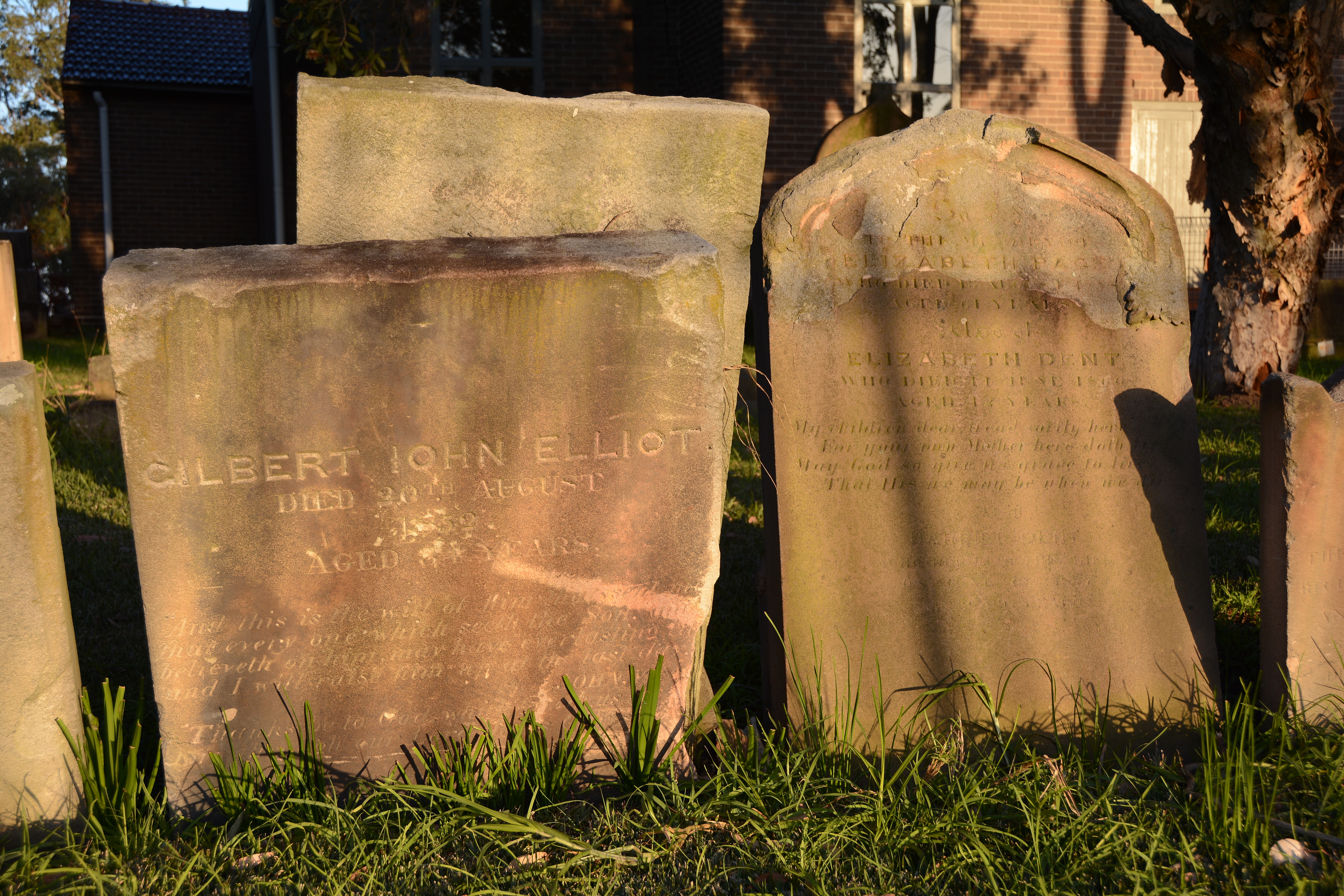
Gravestones in the cemetery

== See also ==
- Australian non-residential architectural styles
- List of Anglican churches in the Diocese of Sydney
