= Tempe House and St Magdalenes Chapel =

Heritage-listed estate and chapel in Sydney, New South Wales, Australia

Tempe House and St Magdalene's Chapel
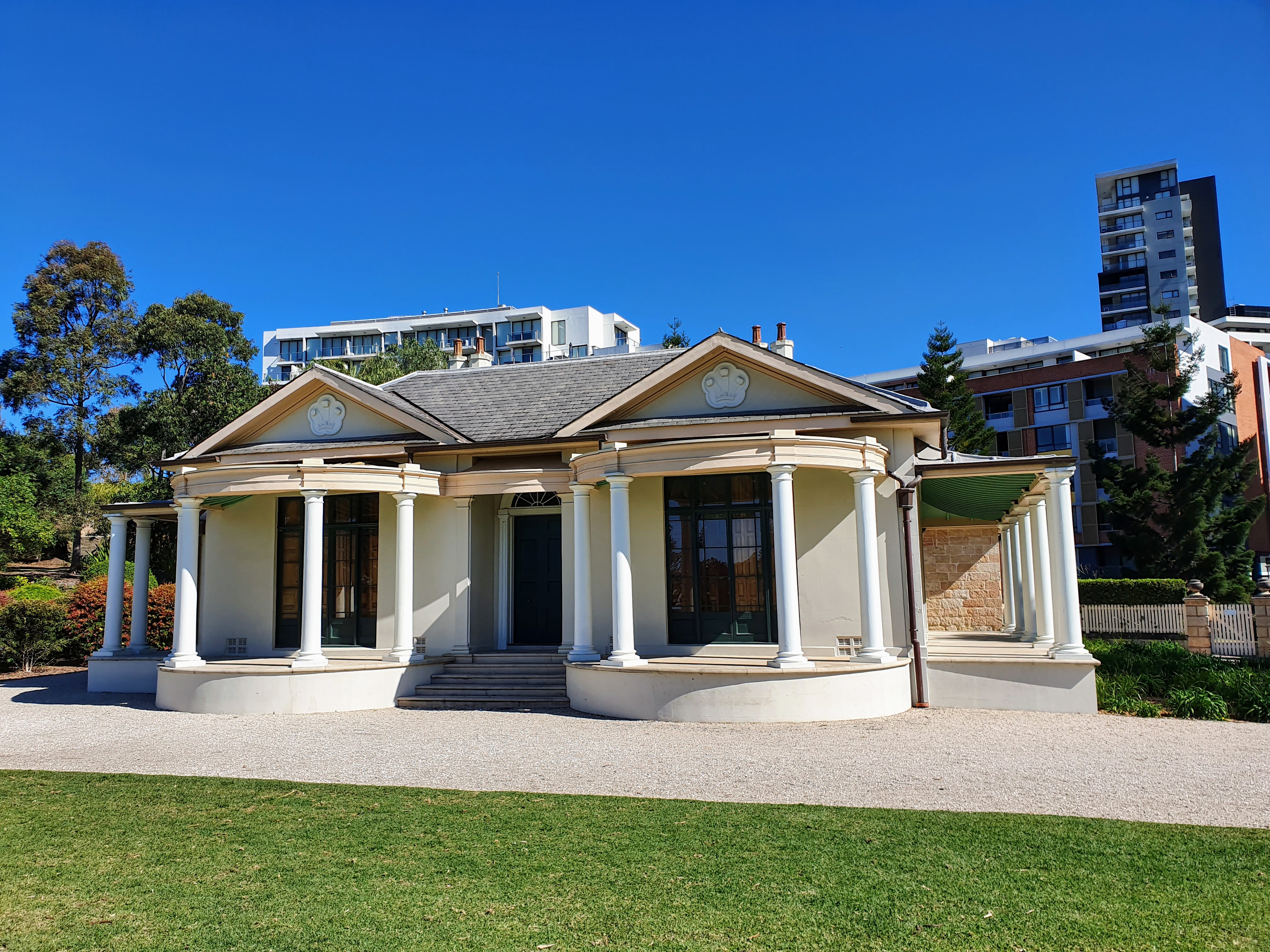
- Tempe House, 2019

- Location within Sydney Location within Australia
- 33°55′46″S 151°09′20″E
- Location: 1 Princes Highway, Wolli Creek, Bayside Council, New South Wales, Australia

History
- Built: 1833–1836

Site notes
- Architects: John Verge (villa); Sheerin & Hennessy (Magdalene buildings)

New South Wales Heritage Register
- Official name: Tempe House & St Magdalenes Chapel; Discovery Point Park (21st century name created by Australand for redevelopment)
- Type: State heritage (complex / group)
- Designated: 2 April 1999
- Reference no.: 725
- Type: Convent/Nunnery
- Category: Religion

Tempe House & St Magdalene's Chapel is a heritage-listed estate and chapel at 1 Princes Highway, Wolli Creek, Bayside Council, New South Wales, Australia. It was designed by John Verge (villa) and Sheerin & Hennessy (Magdalene buildings), with the original villa built from 1833 to 1836. It was added to the New South Wales State Heritage Register on 2 April 1999.

== History ==
Tempe estate was named after the "Vale of Tempe" in Ancient Greece, due to its extensive gardens, designed to enhance the view of the Cooks River. The house was commissioned in 1831 by renowned architect John Verge and is a rare example of his architectural style. The land was first released in 1809 as a series of three land grants, the largest portion awarded to Sergeant William Packer and the remaining two grants were reissued in 1810 by Governor Macquarie. Sergeant Packer sold his land to the original owner of Tempe House, Alexander Brodie Spark in 1826 for 100 pounds. Records from the 1828 census indicate that there were six people living and working on the estate at the time, and by the 1836 census, there were thirty-one people recorded as living and working on the estate.

Tempe Estate formed a deliberately modified natural element, identified as "Mt Olympus", which included Australian shrubbery, and created a suitable backdrop for a house in a picturesque setting. The riverbanks were developed to lay extensive lawns, and as the property was only accessible by boat at the time, a wharf was constructed to accommodate guests; however, it was not completed until 1838. The house after completion was used extensively for entertainment purposes and the scenic gardens included up to fifty differing varieties of grape vines from France, which also attracted horticultural awards.

The construction of a dam between 1839 and 1841 was built from quarried stone in the surrounding cliffs by convict labour, and served to enhance the Estate's already splendid views. The dam allowed the area to be linked to the city by road, leading Spark, in 1841, to construct a carriage drive, a new coach house, stables and grooms quarters. The stables burnt down in 1844, and were replaced, where they then remained until 1960.

1840 saw A.B. Spark begin to face extensive business problems, with his personal borrowings seemingly insurmountable. He attempted to rectify his position by planting saleable crops, however, was eventually overcome and his insolvency was listed on 23 August 1843. He remained at Tempe Estate with his wife and children and attempted to sell twice, however, at the time of his death in 1856 his estate failed to meet his debts.

A.B. Spark was one of the original trustees of St Peters Anglican Church, St Peters. When Spark died he was buried in St. Peter's graveyard. The location of the grave is uncertain.

Tempe Estate was subdivided, and the house was auctioned to brothers Patrick and Thomas Maguire on 24 August 1859 for 2000 pounds. The brothers never resided at Tempe Estate in their twenty years of ownership, however, leased the property out, most notably to Caroline Chisholm. In the years 1863 to 1865, Caroline Chisholm, seen as one of Australia's greatest philanthropists, ran an educational establishment for young ladies in Tempe House.

In 1876, Tempe House was leased as a private residence to Mr C.T. Richardson.

On 23 November 1884, Tempe Estate was sold at Auction to Frederick Gannon for 4000 pounds. He then sold it five months later for the sizable sum of 6,750 pounds to the Trustees of the Good Samaritan Order, Mary Anne Adamson, otherwise known as Superior General Magdalene and Margaret Mary Byrne.

The Good Samaritan Order focused on unmarried mothers and women who were seen to be at risk of sin. By 1887, the sisters had raised enough money to build a penitentiary, laundries and accommodation. The new buildings accommodated forty penitents and were renamed St Magdalene's refuge, also known as The Retreat. A new Chapel was constructed in 1888, adjacent to the house, and by 1900, over one hundred people worked a daily routine in the laundry operations and an inquiry into the refuge over unpaid wages was settled in favour of the Order.

Renowned architects Sheerin and Hennessy were the principal architects employed to design the new penitentiary, laundries and accommodation for St Magdalene's Retreat. It is unclear who designed the Chapel, however, as it has a similar architectural style as the new buildings, the indication was that Sherrin and Hennessy were employed once again. Whilst further additions were made, the house remained largely unaltered until 1944-1945.

By 1944, the Retreat began to develop more into a training centre for the rehabilitation of delinquent girls, who had ended up in the court system, and in the 1940s, there were 55 girls housed at the Estate. Facilities to aid education were added in 1954, a swimming pool in 1959 and a chaplains residence in 1972. External conservation work was undertaken to repair deterioration on the verandah bays that was completed by Hurst and Kennedy architects in 1977.

The Good Samaritan Order remained in ownership of Tempe Estate for over 100 years and in 1989 sold it to Qantek, a branch of Qantas.

1990 saw a Permanent Conservation order established for Tempe Estate, including the house and surrounding grounds to the riverfront. The landscape was deemed to be of greater significance than the buildings associated with the Good Samaritan Order and subsequently, they were demolished with the exception of the Chapel and the iron fencing.

The property passed possession from Qantek to Interciti Arncliffe Developments Pty. Ltd in 2000, who have carried out staged high density development over the southern part of the former estate around a new railway station.

== Description ==
Tempe house covers twelve (12) acres, subdivided into twelve (12) lots, and is confined on all sides by a rail line, the Cooks River, the Princes Highway and an industrial area, the building remains largely intact and is constructed from traditional bearing walls, timber floors and roof framing. The house is symmetrically detailed utilizing classic motifs. Tempe house stands amongst a scenic garden setting depicted as an ideal "Arcadian" landscape, with a long looped carriageway.

The grounds are of exceptional importance for their ability to demonstrate close adherence to early nineteenth century design principles, including the modified natural element Mt Olympus - an unusual example of a detached shrubbery, and for surviving early fabric - walling, gateposts and sundial. They are important for their association for one hundred years with the Sisters of the Good Samaritan and for their framework of mature plantings, particularly the early Olea europaea subsp. europaea. The group of eucalypts on Mount Olympus has value in providing evidence of the natural vegetation on the site. Mount Olympus and the group of eucalypts which, as a group, are rare on a local level. These are an identifiable natural landmark on the Princes Highway.

Mt. Olympus is a small hill on the eastern side of Tempe House, adjoining (on the south side of) the Cook's River. Immediately east of Mt. Olympus is the Princes Highway. Immediately south of it is an access road and high rise blocks of flats built since 2002.

The results of a 2001 archeological assessment indicate that if any archaeological deposits relating to the early nineteenth century use of the site survive, then they are likely to be of high historical and archaeological significance.

=== Tempe House ===
The Northeast elevation boasts bull nose edged verandahs and principally retains the form of the original verandah. There are two pairs of cedar French doors with fanlights above. The windows are symmetrically positioned on the facade, as are the semi circular verandahs with Tuscan timber columns situated either side of the central stairway. The entrance has a wide eight paneled door.

The Southeast elevation incorporates a courtyard with simple detailing and one entry, that is the original six paneled wide cedar door. The original hipped roof is visible from the courtyard as is a small portion of the original verandah, however, the roof has been modified.

The interior of the house has many of the rooms retaining French doors and there are early fireplaces, and six paneled doors throughout most of the common areas. Every room has views out to the trees, and the house revolves around a central hallway. The cedar joinery is finely molded, and is of a similar design throughout the intact areas of the house. The parlour and dining room both feature colonial marble fireplaces and French windows with large areas of glazing for optimal views of the river. There is evidence of the original floorboards in the rear rooms of the house.

=== St Magdalene's Chapel ===
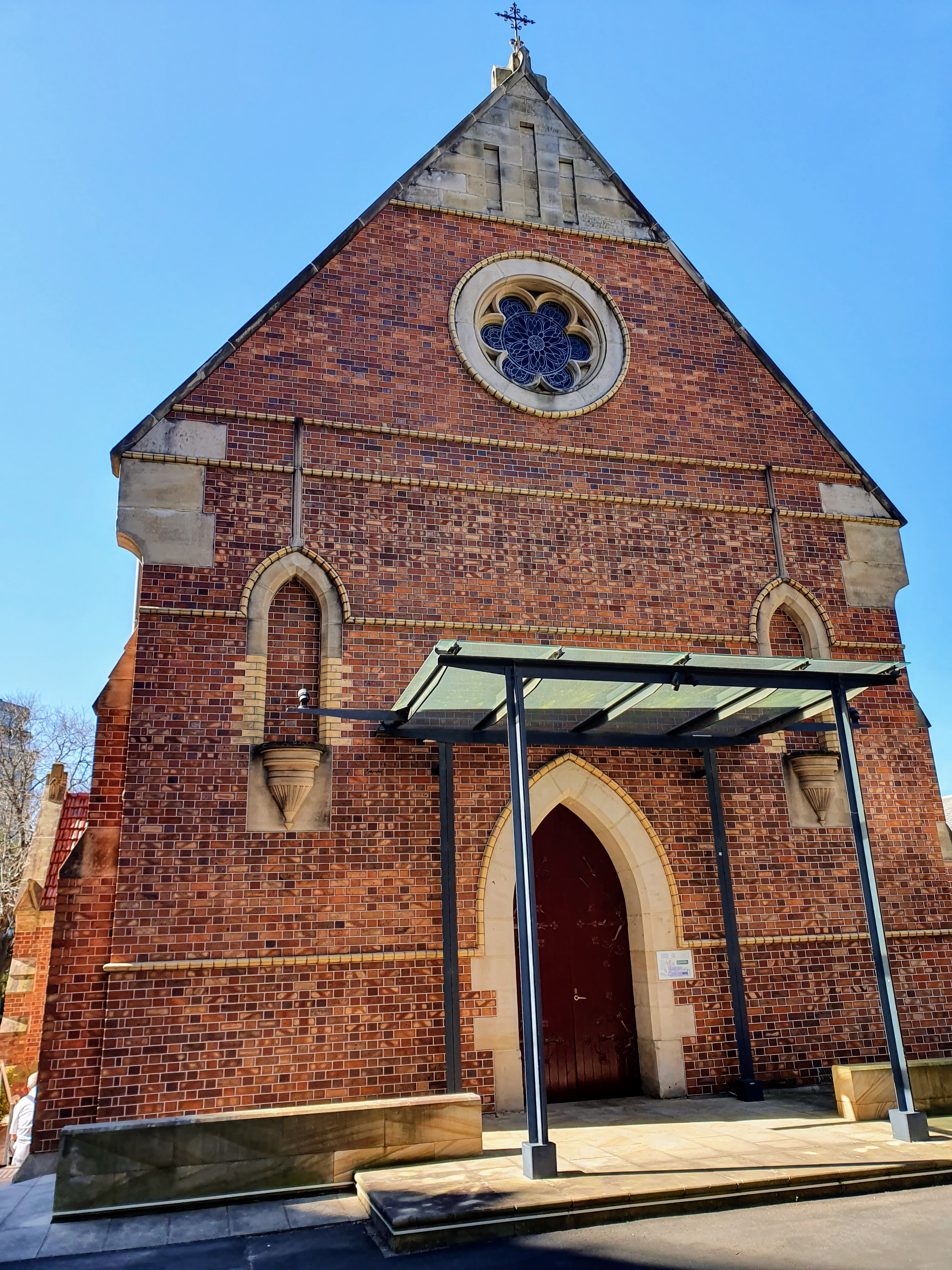
St Magdalene's Chapel

The chapel was built approximately fifty years after Tempe House and is constructed from good quality red brick with cream brick and sandstone detailing. The Chapel, like the house, represents the period of architectural style in which it was built. The Chapel is an example of Victorian Gothic architecture and measures approximately twenty metres long, by ten metres wide, and is a tall single story structure with a steeply sloping roof.

The northeast elevation has stained glass windows with carved sandstone windowsills and simply detailed gables capped with corbelled sandstone eaves, copper guttering and circular down pipes. The southeast elevation has a simple rose window high on the gable end.

The interior of the chapel is plainly finished, and the detail of religious scenes in the stained glass windows is evident. The most striking feature is the vaulted cedar boarded ceiling supported by a series of arched ribs. The interior of the Chapel consists of mainly one large room, with the altar stretching the width of the building, and has an ornate balustrade of wrought iron and timber.

== Heritage listing ==
Tempe House is of exceptional historical significance as a remarkably intact 1830s villa still within its largely unaltered landscape setting. Designed by John Verge, Tempe House is an exceptional and rare example of Neo-Classical Georgian architecture, self-consciously designed as an 'Arcadian villa" for a picturesque setting and the only such example in the Sydney Metropolitan area. The site's association with the historical figures of A.B. Spark, Tempe's original owner, and following occupants, Caroline Chisholm and the Sisters of The Good Samaritan Order is also of significance.

The site's intact nature makes it a valuable technical and research resource.

As the only remaining building from the long period of the Sisters of the Good Samaritan Order's ownership, the St. Magdalene's Chapel, is of high social significance and represents the philosophy and religious beliefs of what was a large and rare charitable institution operating throughout the late 19th and 20th century. Architecturally the St. Magdalene's Chapel is also noteworthy.

Tempe Estate is of exceptional social significance in the local area and displays landmark qualities that can be appreciated from a wide surrounding area.

The garden and grounds of Tempe House, on the Cooks River, at Wolli Creek are of cultural significance on a State level for their siting and development by A.B. Spark according to Romantic Picturesque principles. Tempe Estate is a rare example of an 1830s villa which is still able to be appreciated in its landscape setting. The grounds are of exceptional importance for their ability to demonstrate close adherence to early nineteenth century design principles, including the modified natural element Mt Olympus - an unusual example of a detached shrubbery, and for surviving early fabric - walling, gateposts and sundial. They are important for their association for one hundred years with the Sisters of the Good Samaritan and for their framework of mature plantings, particularly the early Olea europaea subsp. Europaea. The group of eucalypts on Mount Olympus has value in providing evidence of the natural vegetation on the site. Mount Olympus and the group of eucalypts which, as a group, are rare on a local level. These are an identifiable natural landmark on the Princes Highway.

The potential archaeological remains within the study area have a high level of historic and archaeological significance and research potential.

The archaeological excavation and analysis of the remains associated with Tempe House occupation are likely to further our understanding of the colonial occupation of the house, and the material culture and living standards of elite families, their staff and convict servants and colonial attitudes towards gardens and recreation.

The potential archaeological evidence associated with the occupation of the site by the Sisters of the Good Samaritan and their reform institution should provide important information, the analysis and interpretation of which will advance our understanding of reform ideology in the late nineteenth century and early twentieth centuries in Australia.

Tempe House & St Magdalenes Chapel was listed on the New South Wales State Heritage Register on 2 April 1999 having satisfied the following criteria.

The place is important in demonstrating the course, or pattern, of cultural or natural history in New South Wales.

The house and gardens of Tempe Estate remain uniquely intact, which offers a rare opportunity for understanding the cultural history of New South Wales. The estate is of historic significance as the grounds and gardens exemplify an historic and picturesque example of typical British models of 19th century landscape styles. Tempe House belongs to a select group of houses owned by prominent individuals in the colony.

The unique intactness of Tempe House and the landscape setting of the Estate contributes to an understanding of the cultural history of New South Wales.

The Tempe estate is of considerable historical significance as it represents the picturesque aspirations of men of Spark's class during the boom years of the 1830s, and how those aspirations were carried out in the Australian colonial setting.

The place has a strong or special association with a person, or group of persons, of importance of cultural or natural history of New South Wales's history.

The property has a strong historical connection with Alexander Brodie Spark, an important social figure in New South Wales. Spark, a wealthy entrepreneur of the 1830s also built Tusculum at Potts Point, (now the headquarters of the NSW Chapter of the Royal Australian Institute of Architects). He was the largest landholder in the Cooks River area, was instrumental in the building of the St Peters Church and establishing the early community there. He also made popular the Cooks River area through his patronage of the arts, Tempe and the surrounding areas being the subject of numerous paintings by well known artist since the 1840s largely due to Sparks connections and the picturesque scheme he established on the estate. Many of Spark's original documents are available today and together with the intactness of the Tempe Estate provide an extremely rare and valuable historical asset. As such Tempe Estate and its connection to Spark have exceptional historical significance.

The site is associated with several people of renown. As well as the original owner Spark, the Estate is also associated with the architect John Verge who designed the house in 1833, the architects Sheerin and Hennessy who designed the Chapel 1888 and Caroline Chisolm who operated a girls school from the site for a period.

The place is important in demonstrating aesthetic characteristics and/or a high degree of creative or technical achievement in New South Wales.

The house and setting of Tempe Estate are particularly significant as a consciously designed "Arcadian Villa". Spark erected a house designed by John Verge in keeping with his vision of a Grecian inspired temple. The picturesque ideal involved contrasting tamed expanses of open landscape with clusters of rough or "wild" outcrops of rocks or stands of trees. Tempe House was placed to take advantage of the ideal romantic and picturesque site on the Cooks River with the "Mt Olympus" knoll as backdrop. Both the setting and the house designed for it remain an exceptionally intact example of picturesque landscaping and design from the 1830s. These same aspects can be appreciated today despite the many constraints of its setting.

The open space leading to the Cooks River provides views of the surrounding area and Fatima Island that are integral to the landscaped scheme and are of considerable aesthetic importance. The surviving views are similar to those shown in the earliest illustrations both from the northern side of the river toward the house and from the house looking northward across the river. The open space is of importance not only as a historical scheme but also for the contemporary community as the Tempe Estate can be appreciated from many surrounding vantage points. As such, the landscape of Tempe Estate must be seen as highly significant.

Tempe Estate has landmark qualities as an exceptional space within the local landscape. The "Olympus Knoll" and exposed cliff face beside Princes Highway and the open parkland from the river combine to give the site landmark qualities.

Consciously designed as an "Arcadian Villa" Tempe house and setting was designed to take advantage of the optimal views and splendor of the Cooks River. With the backdrop of "Mt Olympus", the house is aesthetically significant as it provides an exceptional example of an 1830s landscape design. Tempe house exemplifies the work of John Verge and includes detail that is not found in his other works. It is the intactness of the original elements in the estate, which generates an extremely high aesthetic significance.

The place has strong or special association with a particular community or cultural group in New South Wales for social, cultural or spiritual reasons.

During the Sisters of the Good Samaritan Order ownership, the site functioned as a place of welfare orientated activities. While not initially opened to the public, the later period of the Order's administration involved sharing the facility with local religious and sporting groups.

Tempe House is also of social significance as a landmark to the local community. The house's association with A.B. Spark, who was active in establishing the local community and the St Peters Church and entertained extravagantly, adds to the social significance of the house. The house can be seen to have functioned as a focus for community activities during Spark's ownership. The subsequent use by the Sisters of the Good Samaritan for community welfare activities enhances the importance of this association.

St Magdalen's Chapel was built by the Sisters of the Good Samaritan Order and designed by architects Sheerin & Hennessy is historically significant as a representation of the occupation of the site for over a century by the Benedictine Order. The stained glass windows directly memorialise the former Superiors of the Order, while the lives and beliefs of the many other women that lived and worked in the St Magdalen's Retreat are indirectly represented by the Chapel buildings itself. While the many other buildings constructed during the Order's period of ownership have been demolished, the Chapel remains a significant historical component within the site.

The Chapel building is significant as the spiritual focus for almost a century of charitable works at Tempe by the Sisters of the Good Samaritan Order. It represents not only the religious devotion of the Sisters living on the site, but also the philosophy of repentance drining the charitable works that governed the operations of the "Retreat" during the extensive period of the Order's ownership.

Tempe House and its surrounding landscape have considerable esteem at both a local and a state level. Contemporary interest in the remnant estate, including the natural vegetation on Mount Olympus clearly demonstrates the value attached to the gardens and grounds as an integral component of Tempe House.

Tempe Estate has been the subject of several major landscape paintings since the 1830s. That the view of Tempe that has been recorded by artists throughout the last two centuries remains largely intact is of significance to the community familiar with the paintings as well as the wider community.

The place has potential to yield information that will contribute to an understanding of the cultural or natural history of New South Wales.

The site offers a significant opportunity to investigate and study a rare and early example of colonial architecture and landscape.

That Tempe Estate has been the subject of several major landscape paintings since the 1830s and that those views largely remain today is of significance for providing a rare opportunity to view the preferred subject matter of 19th century Australian picturesque landscape paintings.

The remaining features of the garden and grounds of Tempe have the potential to reveal the early cultural and natural landscape of the place.

The archaeological remains on the site have the potential to provide evidence associated with not just Spark and his family but also with the large number of servants and convict staff used to establish and maintain the estate.

The analysis and interpretation of the archaeological remains from this site should provide evidence of the material culture of the various occupants of the house as well as contributing to the understanding of the design and development of gardens in colonial Sydney.

The archaeological structures and remains on the site would be able to contribute knowledge into several research questions: The material culture of Tempe House and grounds are likely to contain artefacts and structures whose analysis can provide us with socio-economic information about elite living conditions, including patterns of consumption.

It will also inform us about working, accommodation and living conditions for convicts on colonial properties.

The analysis of the underfloor deposits should be able to add to our knowledge about identification of socio-economic status, gender relations and other areas of substantive archaeological research.

Location of structural remains of outbuildings associated with Tempe House will add to and improve our understanding of the layout of early colonial estates.

Recording the location and construction of the gardens elements will contribute to knowledge about colonial garden design in Sydney. Interpretation of this evidence will help inform us about the ideological influences involved in the design of this landscape.

The archaeological evidence associated with the Sisters of the Good Samaritan and their institutional buildings should shed light on the changing practices of reformatory institutions and the practices of reform and respite. There is great interest in the practices of institutions, in how they controlled the lives of inmates to achieve certain ideological intentions. In this case helping women to "renounce their evil habits".

The potential for intact archaeological evidence associated with the Sisters of the Good Samaritan would provide substantive evidence as to how this late nineteenth century reform institution operated and the way in which the ideology of reform and resistance to it impacted on the physical structure as well as the material artefacts.

The reformatory period evidence may also help inform us about the attitudes of the dominant ideology towards women and how gender relations were constructed between the women inmates and between them and their (female) supervisors.

The place possesses uncommon, rare or endangered aspects of the cultural or natural history of New South Wales.

The house combined with its setting is a rare example of a relatively intact picturesque landscape scheme from the 1830s and 1840s. The integrity of the twelve acres of land immediately surrounding the house offers a rare opportunity for the appreciation of a picturesque aesthetic as designed in the early nineteenth century.

Tempe is a rare and exceptionally intact example of John Verge's work. It is a unique example of a Georgian neo-Classical design, fulfilling both the criteria of the villa and the cottage orne.

St. Magdalene's Chapel, although relatively plainly finished on the exterior, contains some very unusual features, notably: corbelled stone eaves; stone pediments above apse windows, which project above eaves line at the northern end; vaulted cedar boarded ceiling of rare design.

Although not as developed as other examples at Elizabeth Bay House (no longer extant) or Government House, the survival of the Australian shrubbery within the garden is rare.

The group of eucalypts and associated vegetation on Mount Olympus has some scientific value as an indicator of the natural vegetation communities of this part of the Estate.

The use of the main house by the various occupants could be elucidated by archaeological evidence. Archaeological investigation and analysis of the site is likely to reveal remains and information not available from other sources.

The site may contribute data relevant to early nineteenth-century households and economic status in this part of Sydney. The opportunity to examine archaeological assemblages that might contribute to such knowledge is rare and diminishing. The artefact assemblage should reflect all classes of people who lived in the house: owners, servants and convicts.

The evidence associated with the reform institutions is rare and if it survives with any level of integrity it provides knowledge that no other resource can.

This site has the potential to contain archaeological remains associated with two significant phases of occupation of the site. The occupation by Alexander Spark and family and the reform institution operated by the Sisters of the Good Samaritan.

The knowledge to be gained from the analysis of the archaeological material excavated from the study area is relevant to general and substantive problems relating to the archaeology and history of Australia. Some of the areas of research that are germane to historical archaeology are questions relating to:

- colonial attitudes towards house and garden design and private recreation
- identification, analysis and interpretation of living conditions and class structure within nineteenth-century society and how this evidence is structured within the archaeological resource;
- working, accommodation and living conditions for convists on colonial properties;
- examination of the role of gender relations and how it structured nineteenth-century life especially with reference
