= Alexander Brodie Spark =

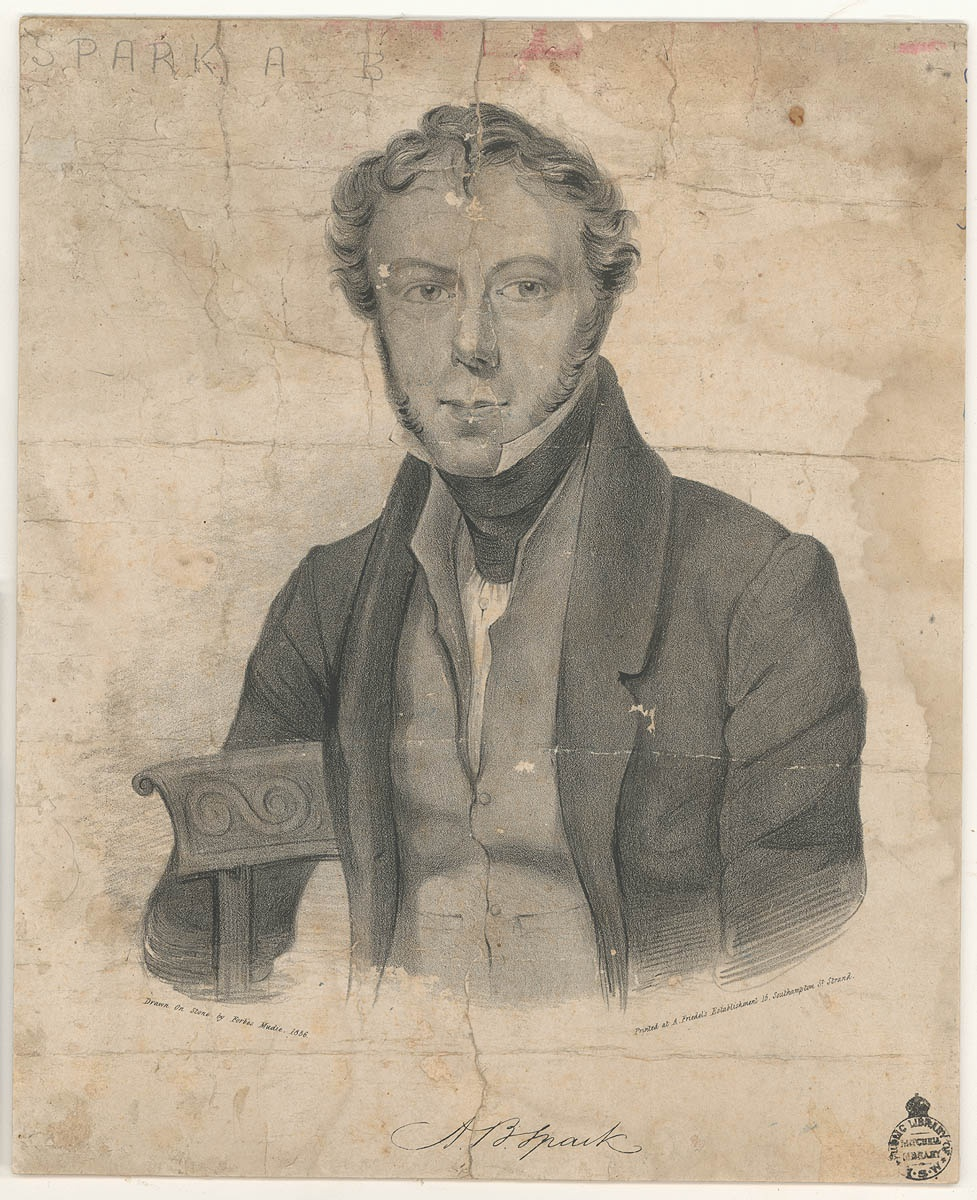
- Born: 9 August 1792; Elgin, Scotland, United Kingdom
- Died: 21 October 1856 (aged 64); Tempe, New South Wales, Australia
- Occupations: Banker, merchant, businessman, free settler, justice of the peace
- Years active: 1811–1856

Alexander Brodie Spark (9 August 1792 – 21 October 1856), influential merchant, businessman and free settler of Australia, was born on 9 August 1792 at Elgin, Scotland.

== Early life ==
The son of a watchmaker, Spark had a literary education in his hometown of Elgin, learnt to speak and studied French, and acquired an interest in astronomy. In the June 1811, after he had had some experience in business, Spark went to London, where he became the founder of a small literary society. Despite himself, Spark found living on £50 a great difficulty, and opted to contact his parents for financial support. His father, at first reluctant to offer his son any sum of money to help him to deal with his sinking financial situation, gave him the money he requested only after Alexander had found a supply of low-priced watches and came up with a design for what Spark called a 'Patent Warning Clock', and not before lecturing Alexander about over-spending and the poor grammar and writing in the letter which Alexander had sent to his father asking for money. In 1820, Spark took a journey around the globe, a continental tour. During this journey, Spark met and spent several days with renowned poet William Wordsworth and a few members of his family, including his wife and sister.

== Life in Australia ==
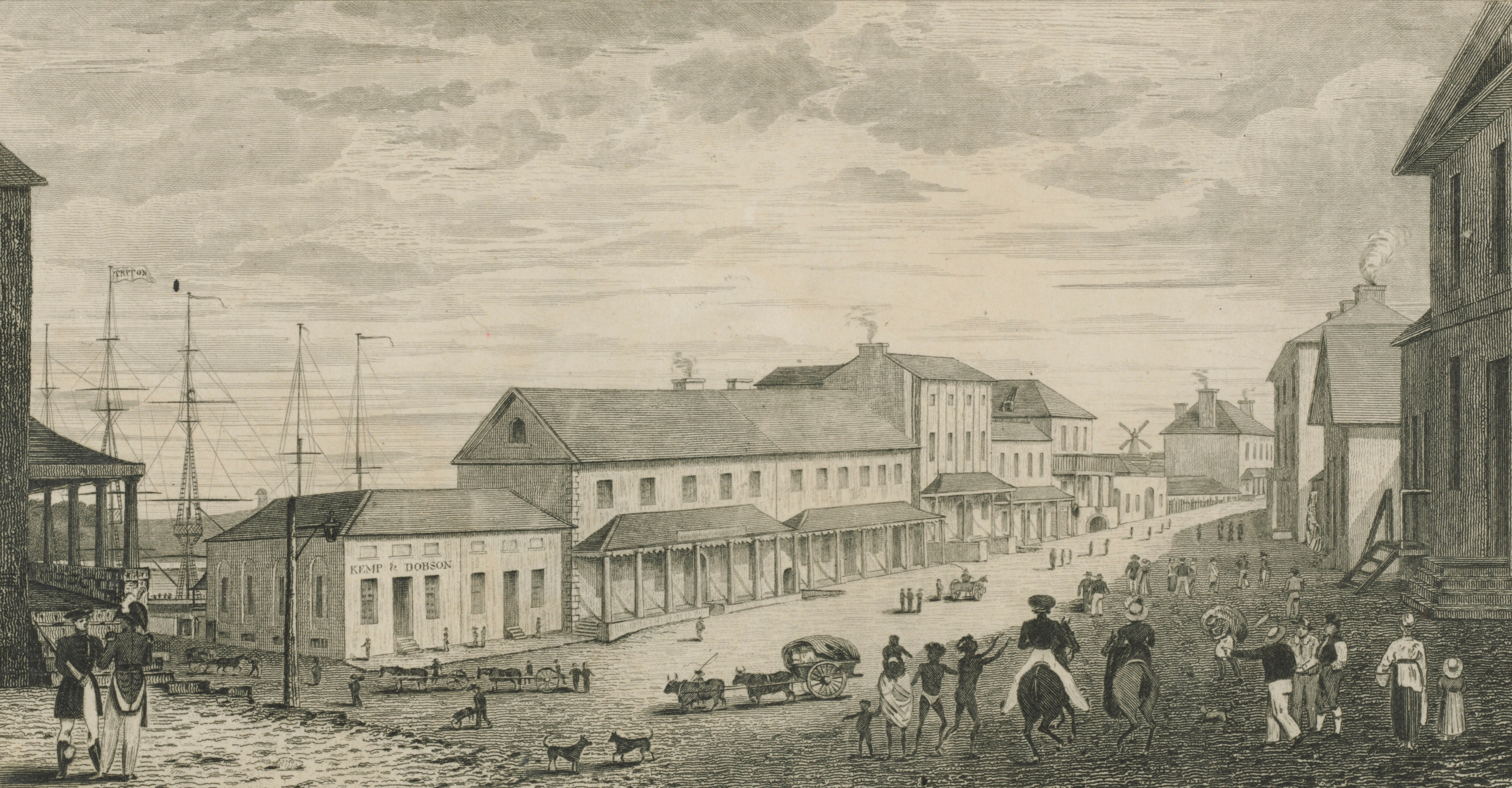
George Street, 1828. At around this time, Alexander Spark's business was thriving.

Now well-monetarily supplied, Spark felt confident that he could start a business of his own, and be the better for it. He also decided that he would go from Europe and try his luck as a free settler of Australia, which had been founded less than fifty years before. After being granted a letter of recommendation as a free settler, Spark voyaged on the Princess Charlotte to arrive in Sydney in April 1823. After arriving, Alexander set up a shop in George Street, where he sold sugar, wines and alcohol and various drapery. Spark also supplied salted meat to the commissariat at Sydney and Parramatta at the time. By 1825, Spark's trading business had greatly expanded, and he was chartering ships to coastal trade routes. A year later, his business had grown even more, and he started a shipping agency. Through this agency, Spark sold incoming cargoes, exporting stores to places such as Hobart, colonial produce to Calcutta, and wool consignments (the first of what would be very many wool consignments) to London, backloading merchandise when it was possible. Additionally, Spark worked as a sort of agent for farmers and country settlers by purchasing their produce and selling them supplies such as livestock and stores, as well as the occasional ploughman or overseer. At this particular time, Spark owned more than six thousand acres (24 km^{2}) of land on the Hunter River and a nine-acre (4 hectare) grant at Woolloomooloo; Spark had developed a passion for land ownership. In 1835, the designer John Verge (who also built Elizabeth Bay House) helped Spark complete his property, now named Tusculum outside of Woolloomooloo Hill (now known as Potts Point). It now houses the Royal Australian Institute of Architects.

Despite the great success of his business, Spark engaged in and did a great many things in and around Sydney. He served on the Sydney Grand Jury, became its foreman in 1826 and, in 1827, a justice of the peace. Spark engaged in the committee of the Agricultural Society and the Chamber of Commerce, as well as supplying support and sometimes finances to causes such as those of Scots Church, the Benevolent Society and the Female School of Industry. Additionally, despite two failed attempts at becoming a director of the Bank of New South Wales, he was able to join the first board of the Bank of Australia, also in 1826. He later became the board's managing director in 1832. By this time, business for Spark had increased (especially in the wool industry), and continued to increase over the next few years. While continuing his prior engagements, Spark began work on designing himself a house, where he planted a vineyard and an orchard, being the treasurer of Australian Gaslight Co. and director of at least two insurance companies, as well as being an active investor in several steam navigation companies.

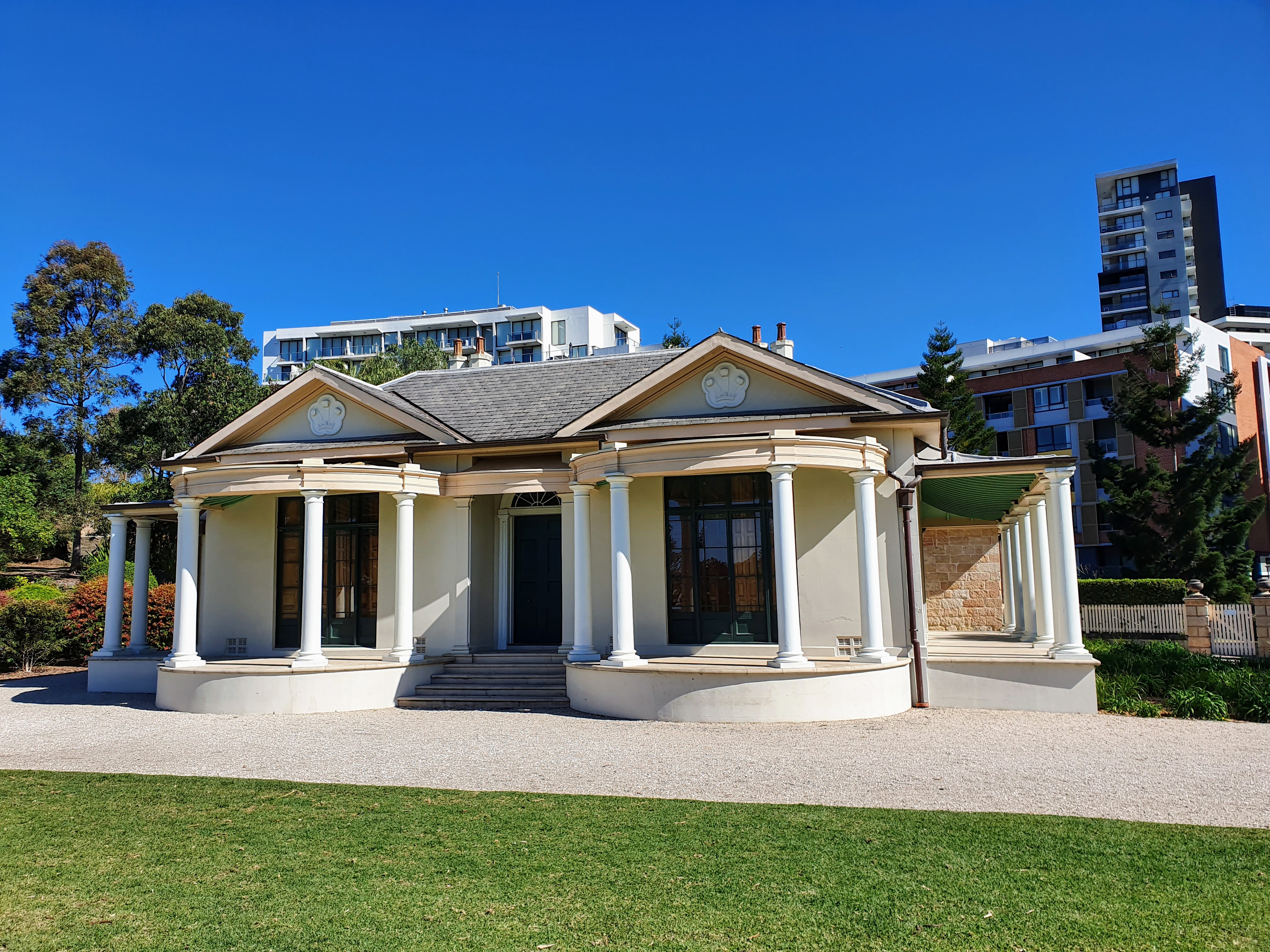
Tempe House; Spark's residence

With all of his business-related and social partakings and engagements, Spark's new home, after it had been designed and built, became something of a rendezvous for many of the people he was associated with – bankers, merchants, landowners and magistrates he met on his regular visits to the Hunter River region. During this time, Spark had begun to become somewhat perturbed by the divisions between the Presbyterians in Sydney, and decided to turn to the Church of England. He became involved in his new faith, and was involved in and supported the construction of St Peters Church, St Peters, which was consecrated in 1839. 1839 was a busy year for Spark – he entertained over 800 visitors at his house in Tempe, and became involved in yet more enterprises including becoming vice-president of Commercial Banking Co. of Sydney, becoming an agent of the South Australian Co. and becoming director of Australian Loan Co. Spark also extended his land dealing to the regions of Melbourne and Victoria, as well as becoming agent for some twenty-two ships. He was part owner of a number of ships himself.

== Later life and death ==
It was in 1840 that Alexander Spark purchased an amount of land in New Zealand, while also taking pastoral leases in the New England district, even though he already had over 50 deeds to land; this displays how much land ownership meant to Spark.

On 27 April 1840, Spark married Frances Maria, née Biddulph. It seems that, after this marriage, Spark began to lose a great deal of money very quickly, for a number of reasons. Spark had guaranteed loans to people who were now bankrupt or otherwise out of finances, and, by September, a wave of drought, among other things, had caused unrest and nervousness in the money market. To keep himself from facing bankruptcy or becoming broke, and also to help pay for large bills (£21,000 worth) he acquired in March 1841, he sold off much of his land, his shares and his ships. He also mortgaged a town house for £6,000. To make matters worse (financially), Spark's baby was born in April 1841, which meant that he had to support two other people as well as himself. Finally, having had to sell all of his assets to pay for his many debts, Alexander Spark became officially insolvent in 1844. During this time, when Spark was losing so much money so fast, his diary records at length his depression and sadness about the losses. It also records his mixed feelings about his wife's pregnancy, and his worries about whether he would have the finances to support it.

Despite being insolvent, Spark managed to recover, but very slowly. By 1846, Spark was shipping stores of copper to England, as well as shipments of horses to India. he further re-established his place in society, and much of his fortune, after successful speculation made about the discovery of gold in Ballarat, Victoria in 1851.

Due to heart problems, Spark died at Tempe on 21 October 1856. He was survived by his wife and five children.

== Personal life ==
Spark is known to have enjoyed playing cards and chess, and patronised the arts. He also played golf on a regular basis, fished in Cook's River (where he also bathed, on occasion) and liked to read books for leisure. He also enjoyed the theatre and concerts, and also often went to social dances or balls.

Spark kept diaries and journals and an edited version of these for the years 1836 to 1856 have been published and provide much detailed information about his life and times.

Spark was widely concerned with public affairs, and was very active in that regard, but was mostly too patronising to have much effect on people less wealthy than himself; for all that he represented, he never had a deep identity with Australia, where he spent much of his life. His piety only seemed actually present and noticeable when he was in times of need or greatly distressed, such as in the time of his great monetary losses between 1840 and 1844. He is also remembered to have been very severe in his judgements on criminals, but himself managed to avoid controversy or accusation in the public eye.

== See also ==
- History of Australia
