= Campsie, New South Wales =

Campsie
- Suburb
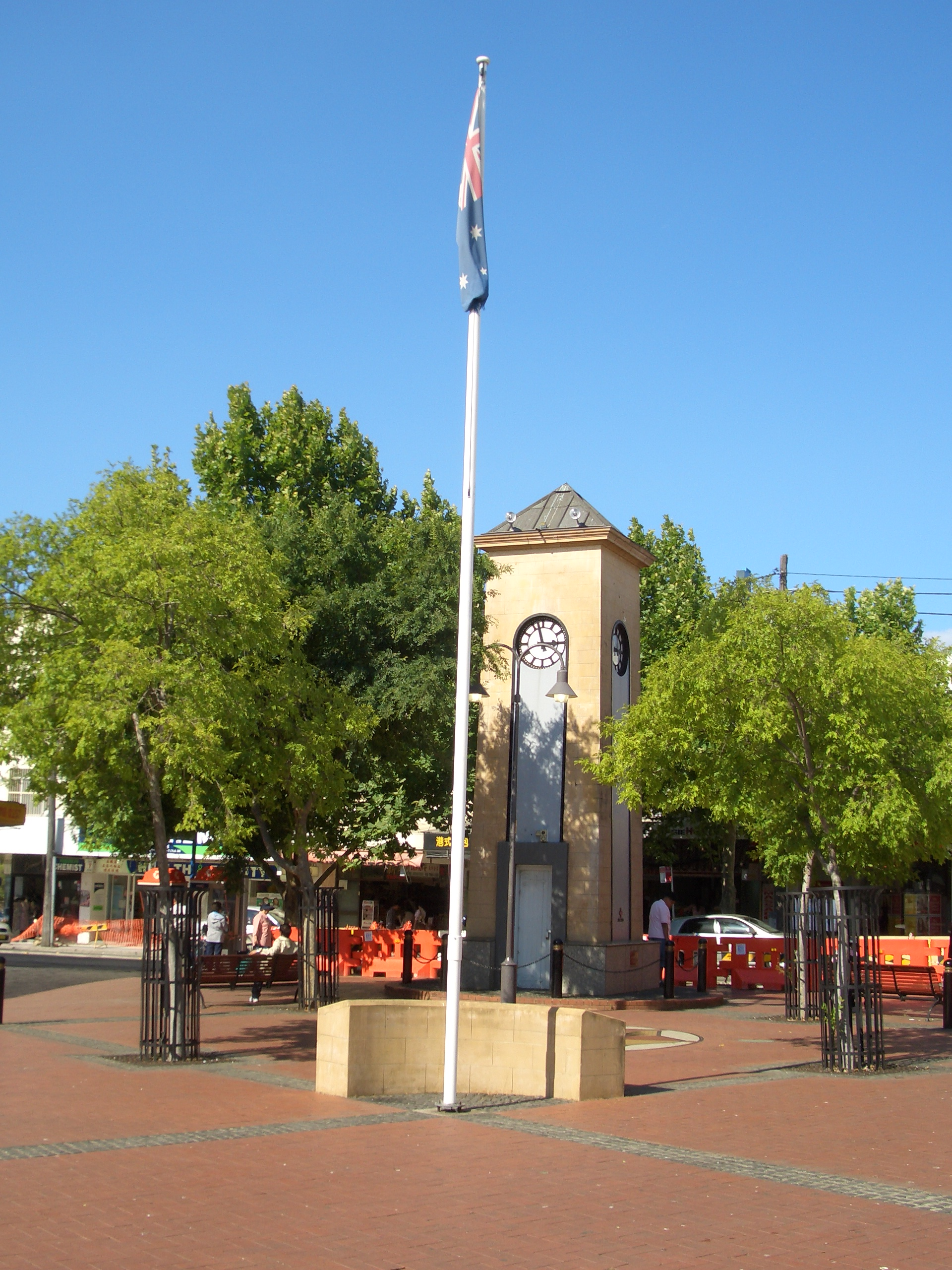
- Anglo Road Mall, Campsie

- Interactive map of Campsie
- Country: Australia
- State: New South Wales
- City: Sydney
- LGA: City of Canterbury-Bankstown
- Location: 13.4 km (8.3 mi) south west of Sydney CBD

Government
  - State electorate: Canterbury
  - Federal divisions: Barton; Watson
- Elevation: 32 m (105 ft)

Population
  - Total: 26,132 (2021 census)
- Postcode: 2194
Suburbs around Campsie
Belfield	Croydon Park	Ashbury
Belmore	Campsie	Canterbury
Kingsgrove	Clemton Park	Earlwood

Campsie is a suburb in the state of New South Wales, Australia. Campsie is 13.4 kilometres south-west of the Sydney central business district, on the southern bank of the Cooks River. Campsie is one of the administrative centres of the City of Canterbury-Bankstown.

== History ==
In 1851, Campsie was named after a range of hills in Scotland, a district known as the Campsie Fells.

=== Aboriginal cultures ===
Indigenous Australians lived in this area for thousands of years. In 1770, the land along the Cooks River was explored by officers from HM Bark Endeavour.

=== European settlement ===
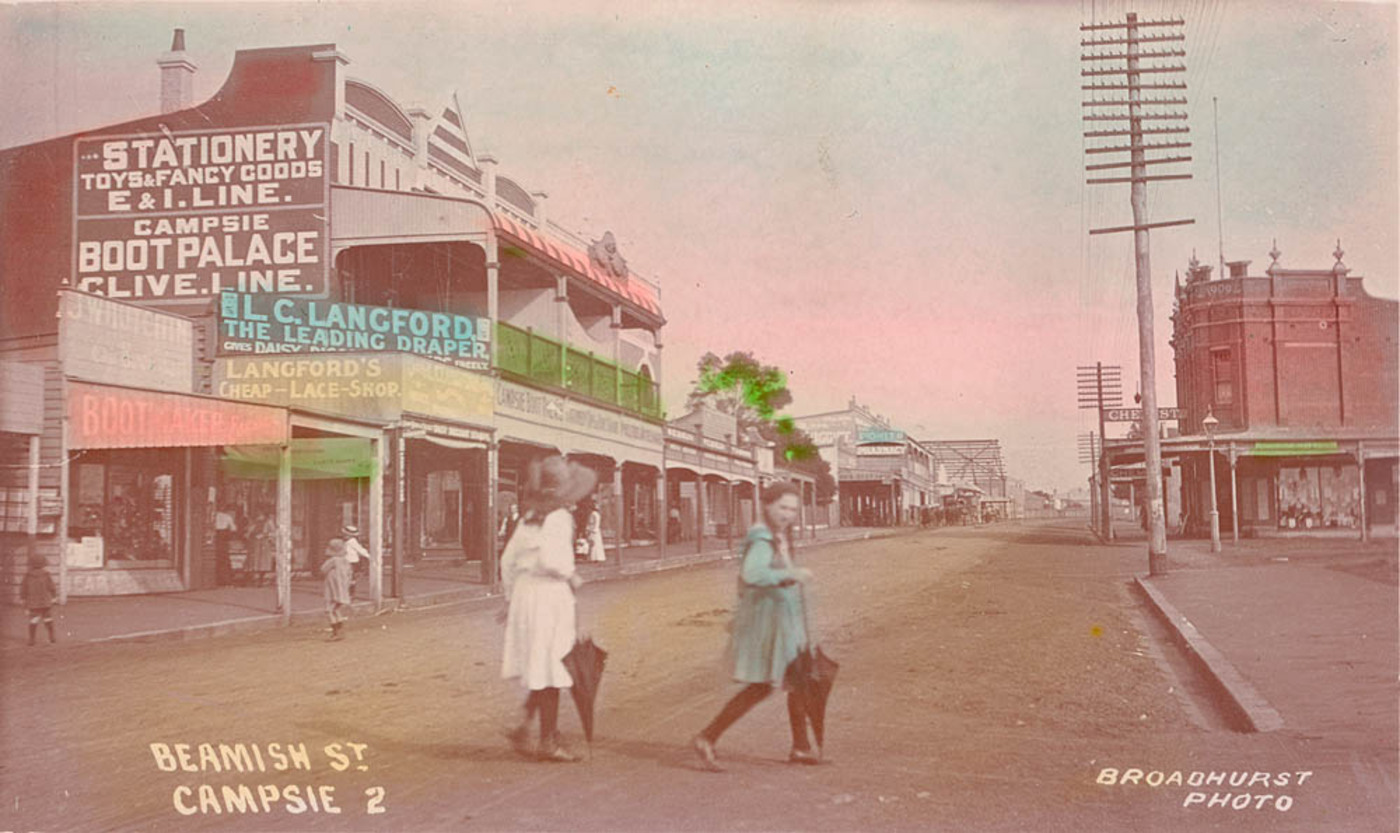
View along Beamish Street

In the early days of European settlement, the land in this area was mostly used for farming. The southern parts of Campsie were part of the Laycock estate that extended to most of Kingsgrove. The area between South Campsie and the Cooks River was known as the Redman estates. John Redman was granted 100 acres (40 ha) in 1812 and he later purchased the area to the east, which was a land grant of 200 acres (81 ha) to Thomas Capon in 1817.

The railway was completed in 1895, encouraging suburban development and leading to the area becoming heavily populated. The line passed through the Campsie Park estate which was owned by the Anglo-Australian Investment Company. A large wooded area was cleared for the construction of the station on Beamish Street. The first post office opened in April 1900 and the public school opened in 1908.

The earliest model suburb in New South Wales was Harcourt, between Canterbury and Burwood, developed by William Phillips from 1889. The 200 acres (81 ha) was covered in scrub and inhabited by wild birds. The land was cleared and the streets were called avenues on the model of New York City. Although the suburb no longer exists, the Harcourt name remains as a locality and is reflected in the name of Harcourt Public School on First Avenue.

The Town Hall of the Municipality of Canterbury was moved to Campsie in 1962. The City of Canterbury was declared in 1993.

== Education ==
There are three primary schools in Campsie:

- Harcourt Public School
- Campsie Public School
- St. Mel's Primary School

== Demographics ==
In the 2021 census, there were 26,132 people in Campsie. The most common reported ancestries were Chinese 34.5%, Nepalese 9.6%, English 7.1%, Australian 6.2% and Lebanese 5.5%. 28.6% of people were born in Australia. The next most common countries of birth were China 20.4%, Nepal 9.2%, Malaysia 4.3%, Vietnam 3.6%, and Philippines 2.9%. 20.0% of people only spoke English at home. Other languages spoken at home included Mandarin 21.5%, Nepali 9.2%, Cantonese 8.6%, Arabic 5.1% and Vietnamese 3.9%. The most common responses for religion were No Religion 31.7%, Catholic 16.2%, Buddhism 11.1%, and Hinduism 10.7%.

== Commercial area ==
Campsie has a mixture of suburban residential, retail and light industrial developments. The main shopping centre is situated along Beamish Street, close to Campsie railway station and surrounding streets. The Campsie Centre is a shopping centre located between Amy Street and Evaline Street. It contains supermarkets, a discount department store, many specialty shops, cafes and a library. Commercial and light industrial developments run along the length of Canterbury Road.

Canterbury Hospital is a district hospital located on Canterbury Road.

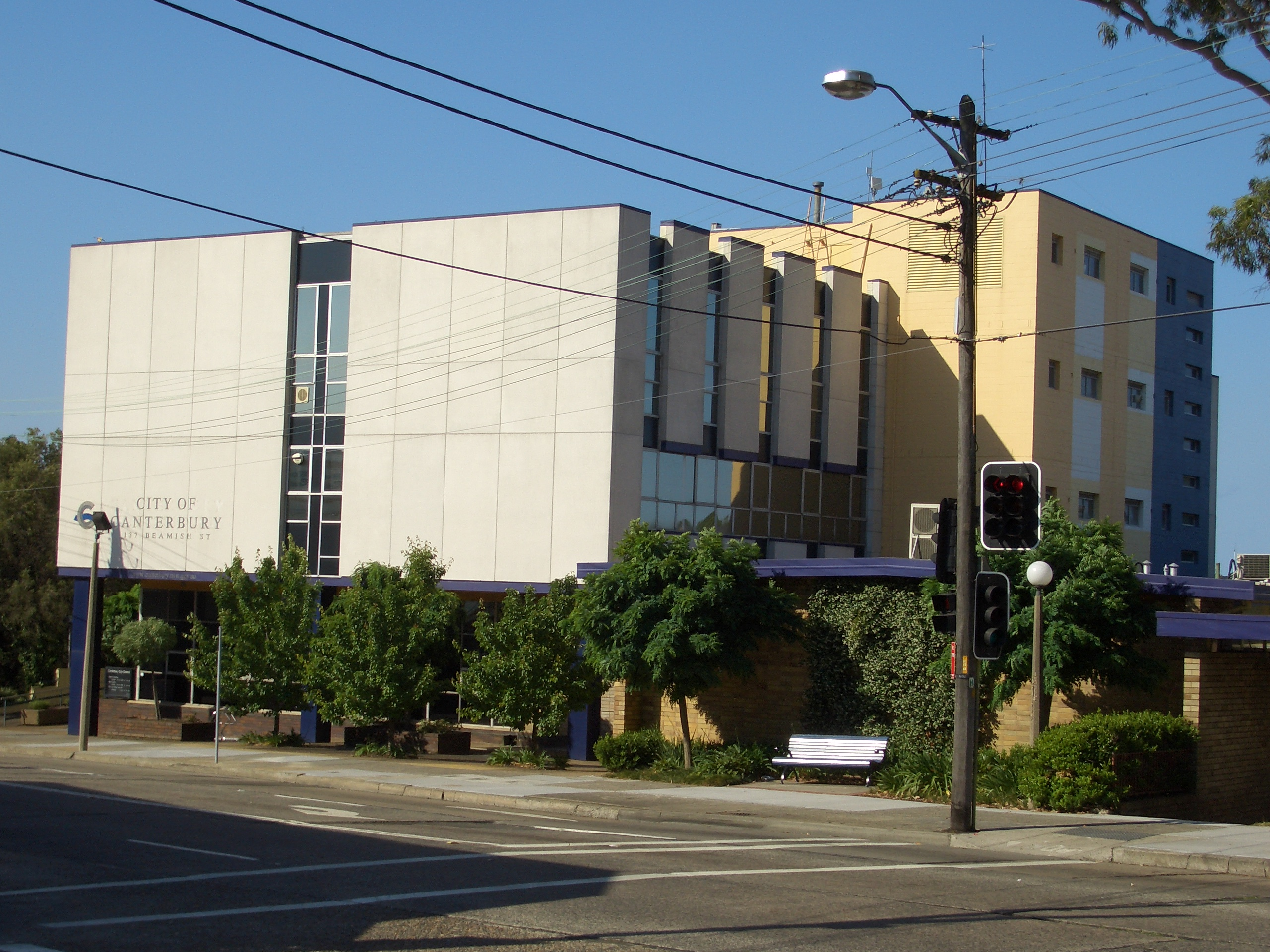
City of Canterbury Council Chambers

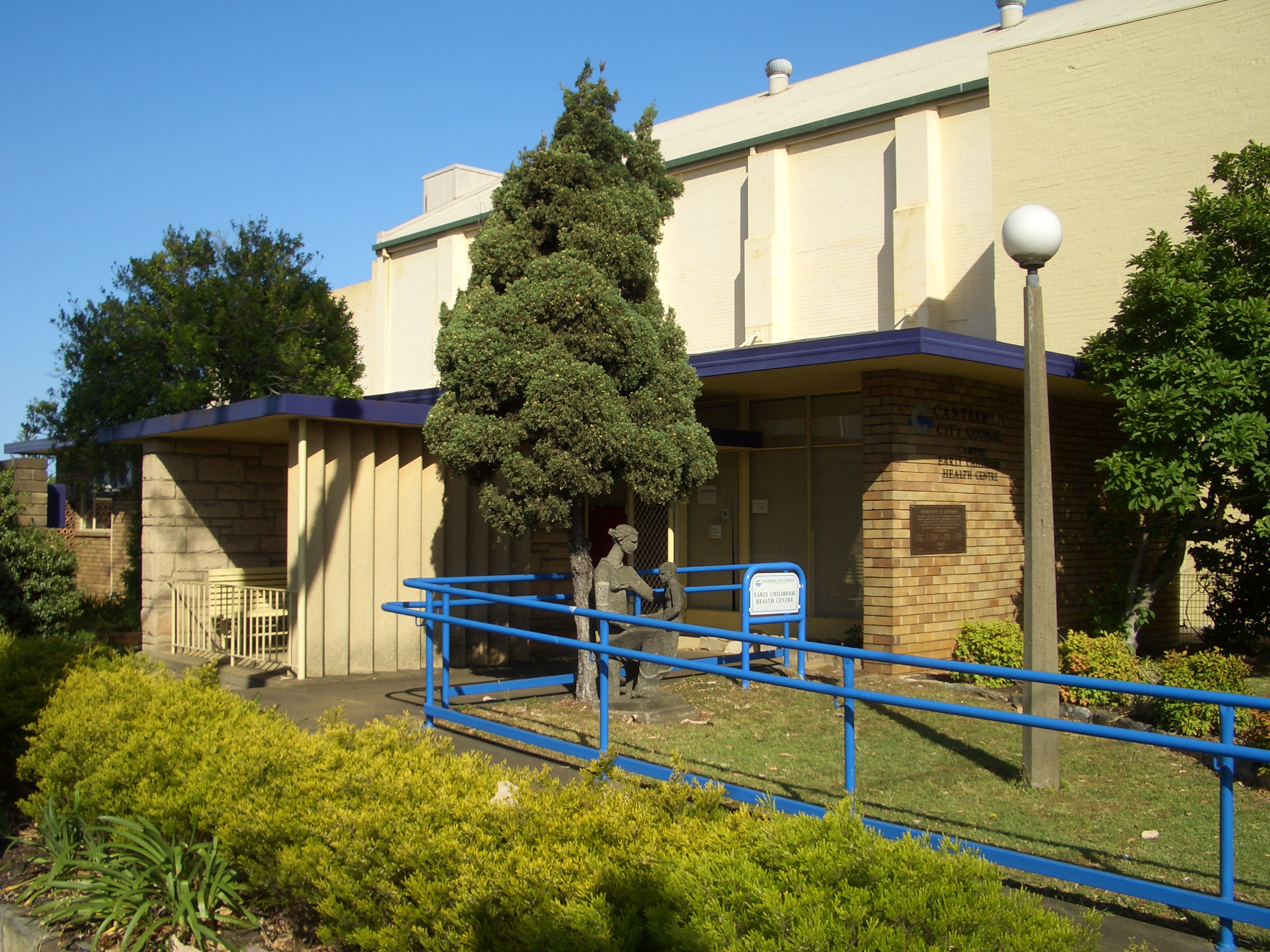
Campsie Early Childhood Centre

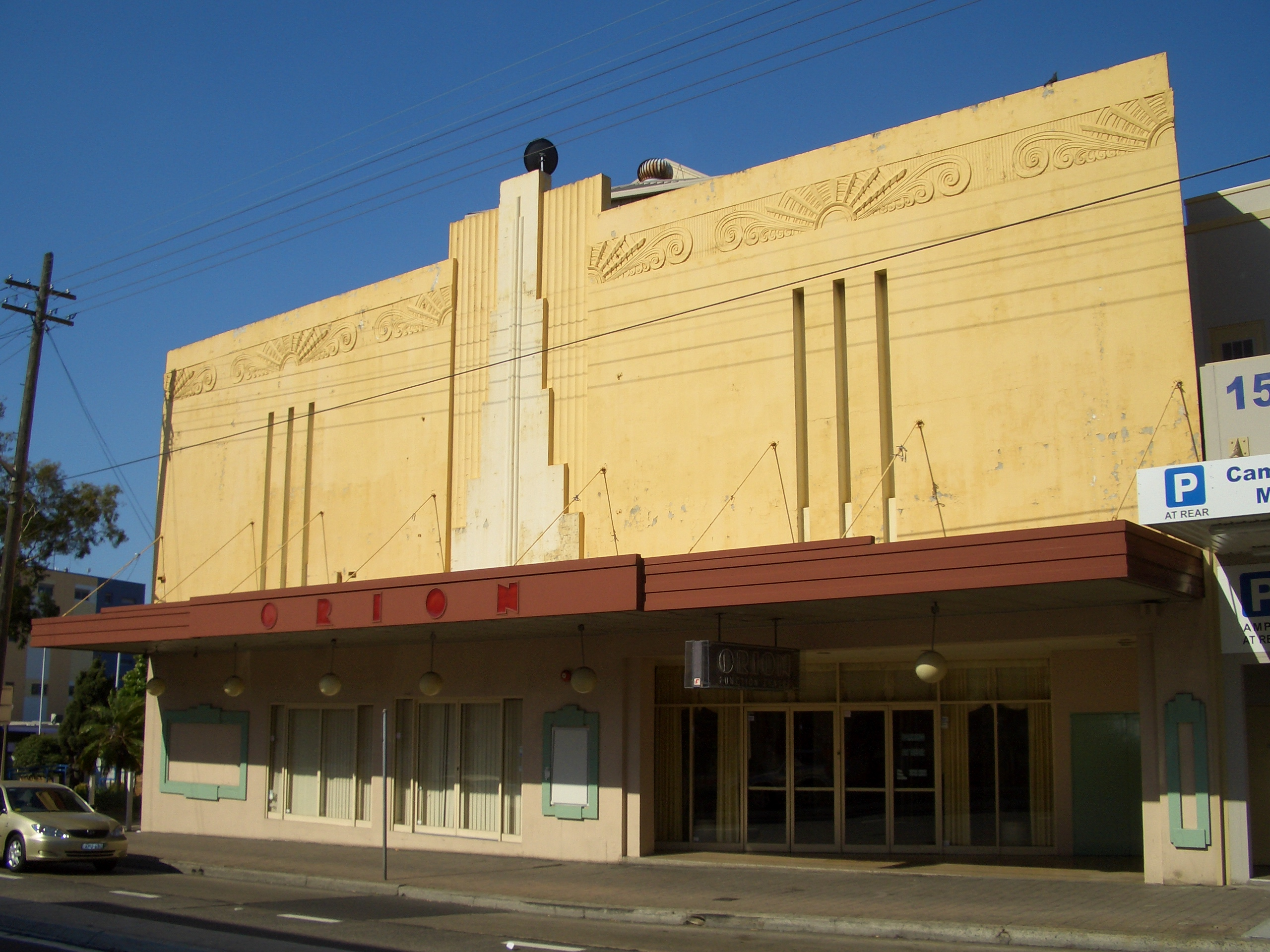
Orion Function Centre

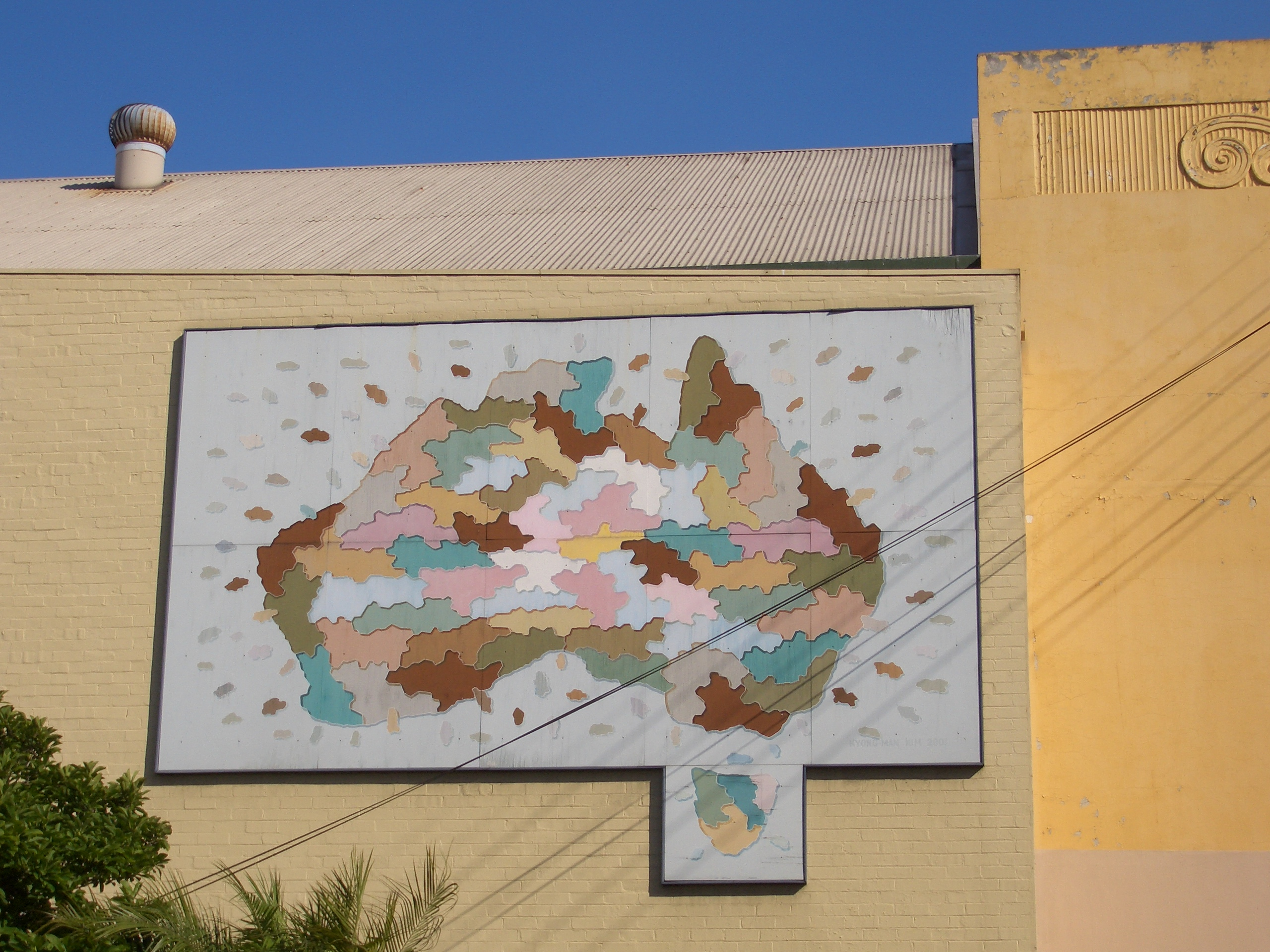
Artwork on the Orion Function Centre

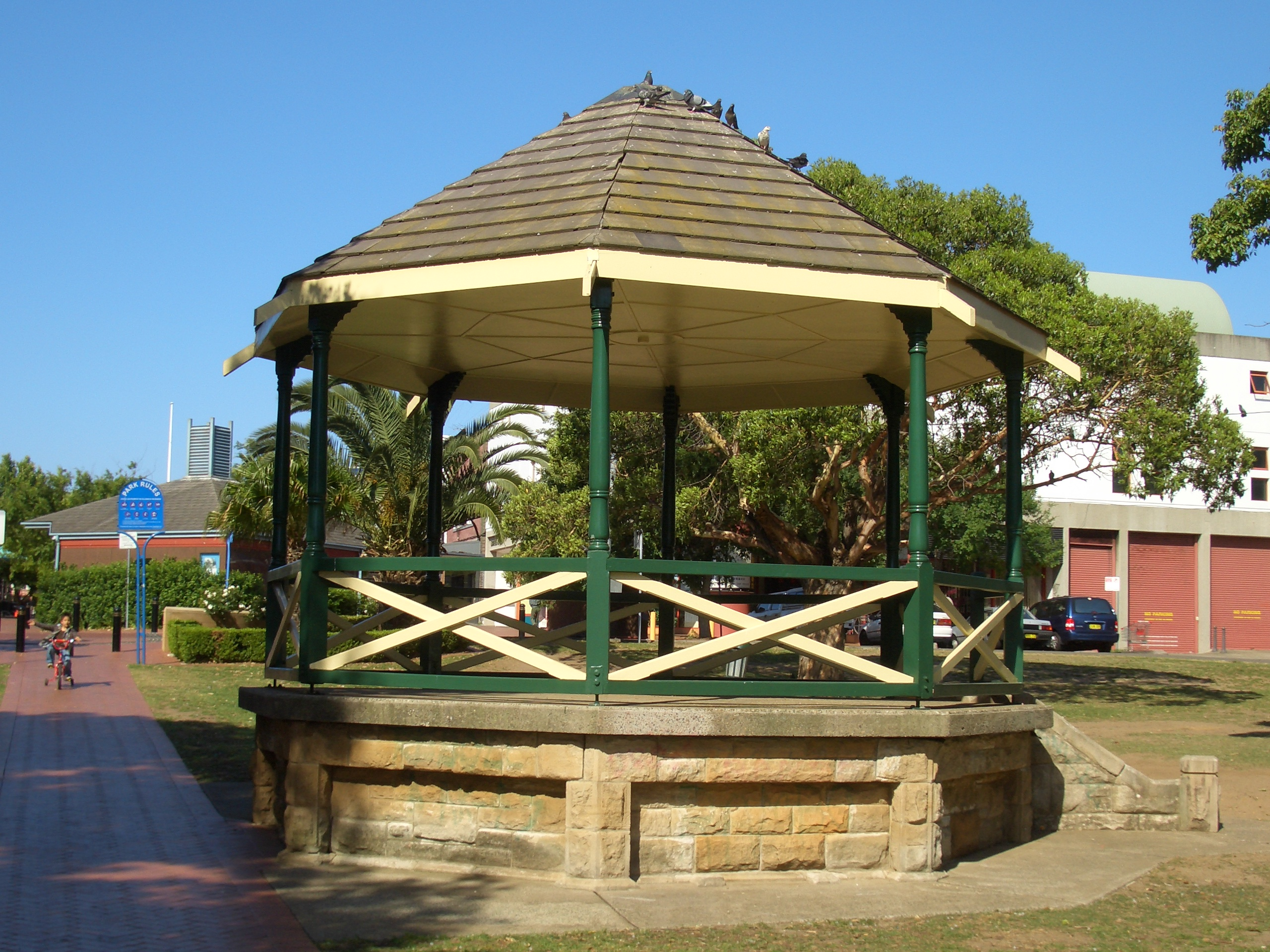
Anzac Square

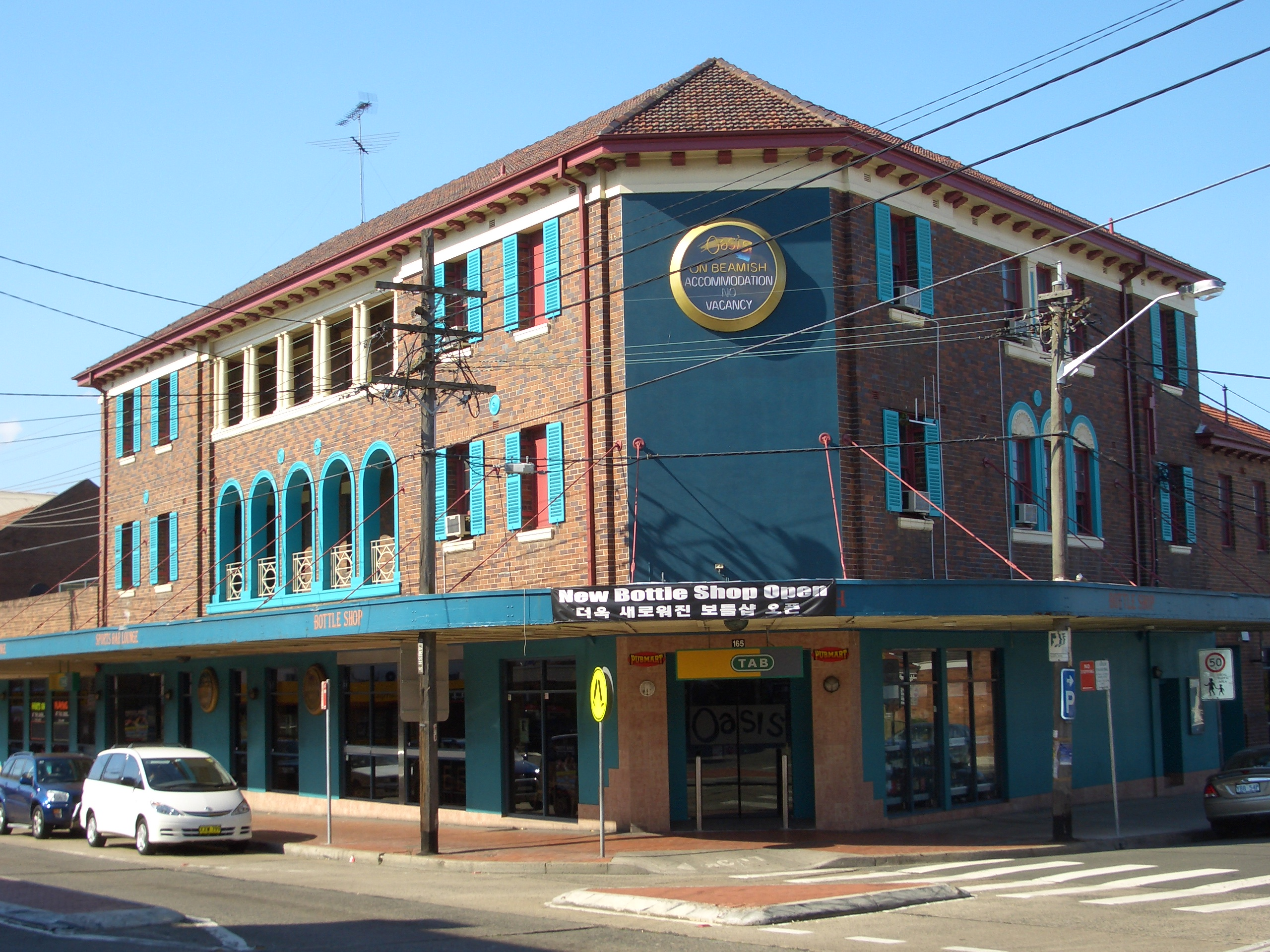
The Oasis on Beamish

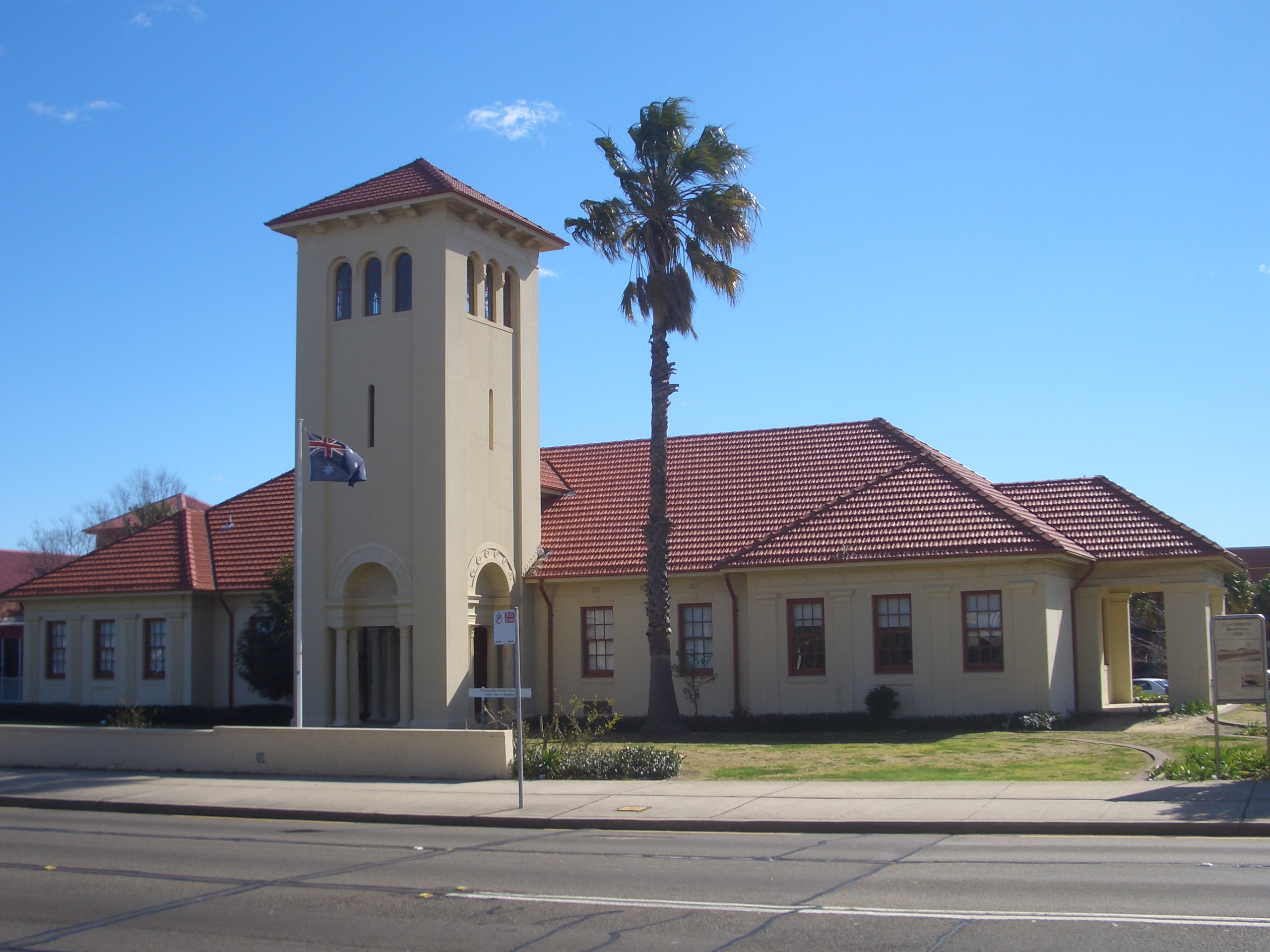
Canterbury Hospital

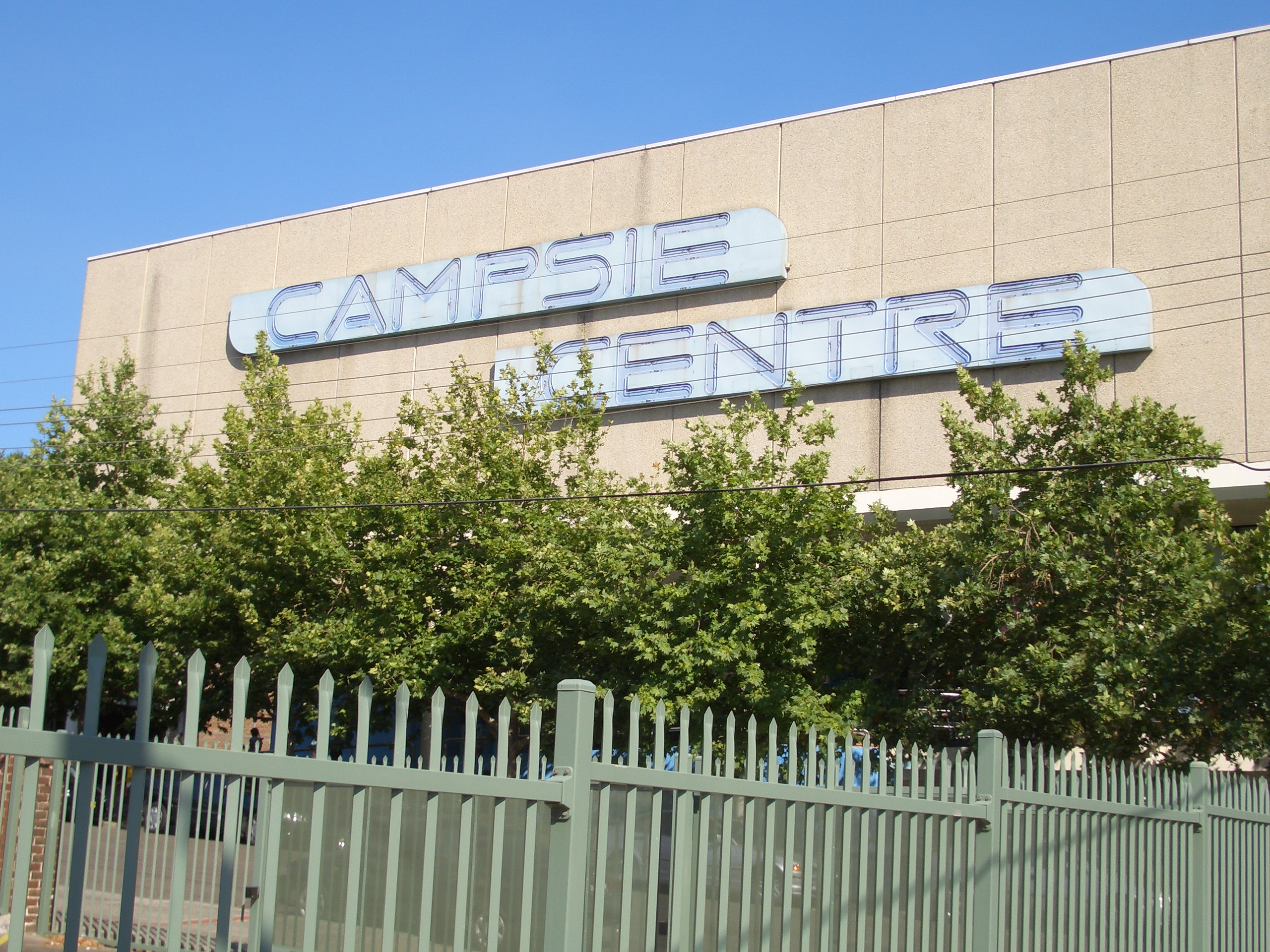
Campsie Centre

== Transport ==
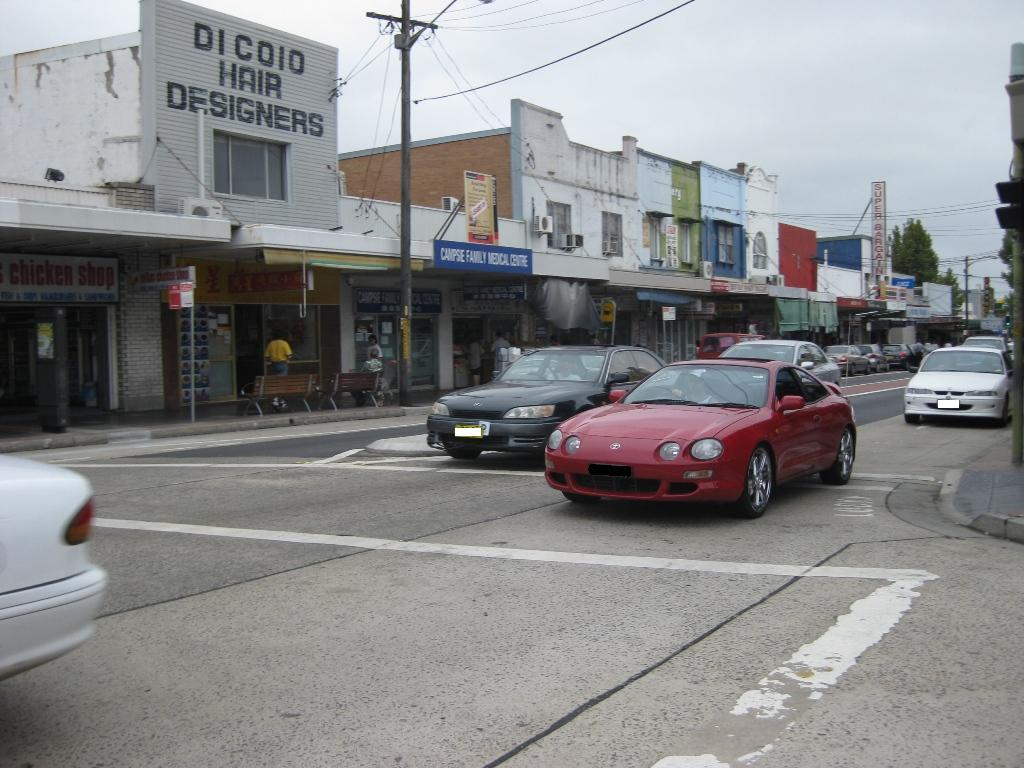
Intersection Beamish Street and Evaline Street

Campsie railway station is located on the Metro North West & Bankstown Line of the Sydney Metro network. Prior to conversion to metro, Campsie was served by the Sydney Trains network through the Bankstown line The line was opened in 1895 and electrified in 1926. It was converted to Sydney Metro standards between 2024 and 2026. Two additional tracks operate as part of the Sydney Freight Network.

Beamish Street runs north–south for 1.6 kilometres and is characterised by retail and commercial developments over most of its length. Canterbury Road is a major arterial route, 11 kilometres long and connecting the inner suburbs of Sydney with Bankstown and suburbs further to the south-west.

== Parks ==
- Anzac Park
- Loch Street Reserve
- Mildura Reserve
- Federation Reserve
- Harcourt Reserve
- Lofts Garden

== Politics ==
Campsie is part of Canterbury Ward of the City of Canterbury-Bankstown, which elects three councillors to the city council.

For New South Wales state elections, the suburb is in the Electoral district of Canterbury. The district includes surrounding suburbs of Canterbury, Earlwood, Hurlstone Park, Croydon Park, western Dulwich Hill, eastern Belfield and northern Turrella.

For federal elections, Campsie is in the electoral division of Watson. In state and federal elections, Campsie residents predominantly vote for the Australian Labor Party.

== Churches ==
- The Pentecostals of Sydney (formerly known as Grace Tabernacle) - 22-24 Harp Street.
- St Mel's Catholic Church (attached to St Mel's Primary School) - on the corner of Evaline St and Duke St.
- St John's Anglican Church - 26 Anglo Rd
- Campsie Baptist Church - 2 Claremont St
- St. John The Baptist Antiochian Orthodox Church - 26 First Avenue
