= Clemton Park =

- Suburb
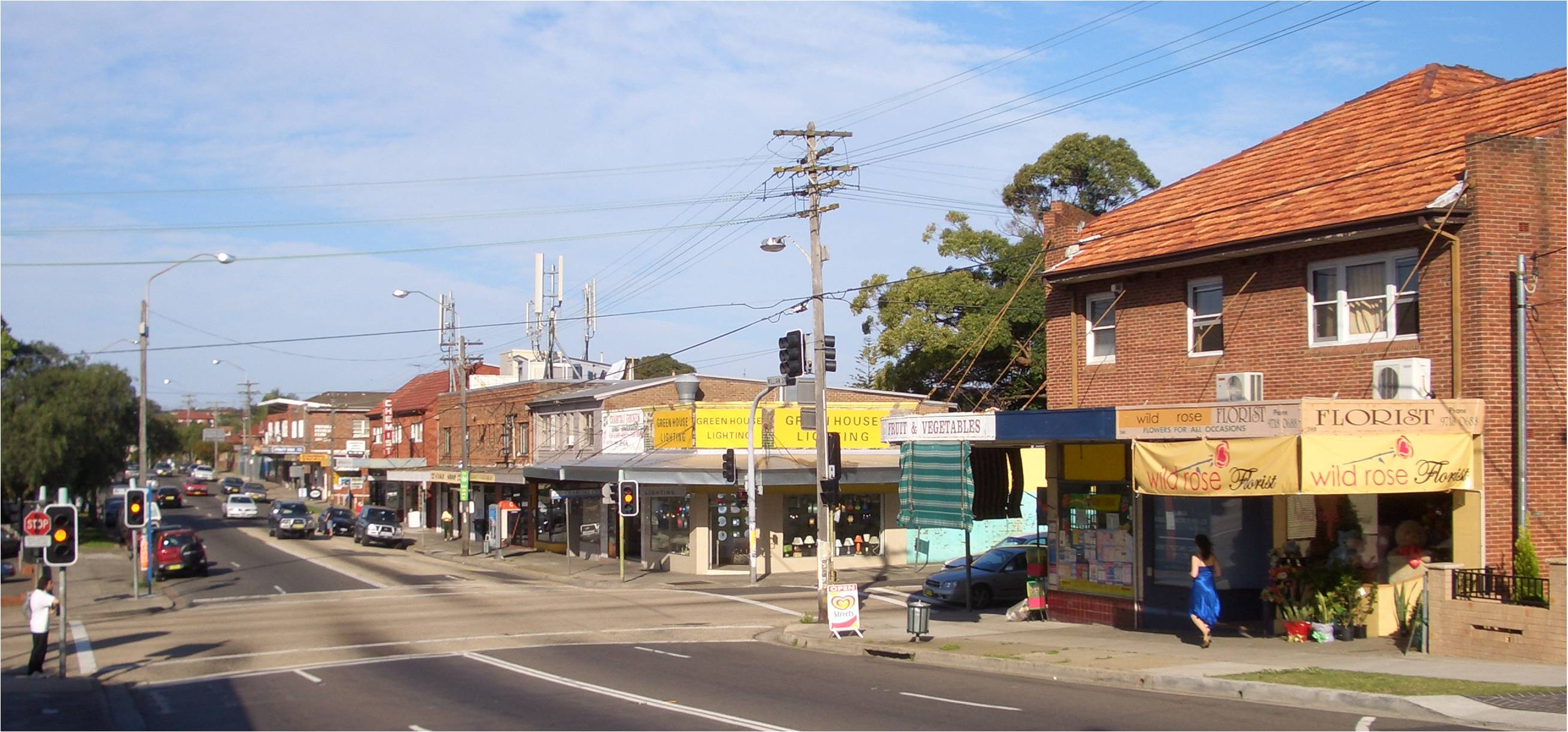
- William Street and Bexley Road intersection, in neighbouring Earlwood and adjacent to Clemton Park

- Interactive map of Clemton Park
- Country: Australia
- State: New South Wales
- City: Sydney
- LGA: City of Canterbury-Bankstown
- Location: 13 km (8.1 mi) south-west of Sydney CBD

Government
  - State electorate: Canterbury
  - Federal division: Barton
- Elevation: 27 m (89 ft)

Population
  - Total: 1,676 (2021 census)
- Postcode: 2206
Suburbs around Clemton Park
Belmore	Campsie	Canterbury
Roselands	Clemton Park	Earlwood
Beverly Hills	Kingsgrove	Bexley North

Clemton Park is a suburb in south-western Sydney, in the state of New South Wales, Australia. It is 13 kilometres south-west of the Sydney central business district in the City of Canterbury-Bankstown. The suburb is approximately bounded by Cup and Saucer Creek, Bexley Road in the east, William Street in the south and Kingsgrove Road, but excludes most of the properties which face onto those roads. Those properties are instead in the neighbouring suburbs of Earlwood, Kingsgrove and Campsie.

Clemton Park is a small suburb and almost entirely residential. Institutions, shops and facilities named or associated with "Clemton Park" are mostly situated outside the suburb boundaries: a small group of shops located at the intersection of Bexley Road and William Street, and Clemton Park Public School, are in the neighbouring suburb of Earlwood. Clemton Park Shopping Village is mostly situated within the suburb of Campsie. The park named "Clemton Park" is situated in Kingsgrove.

== History ==
This area was part of the 50-acre (200,000 m^{2}) Laycock estate granted to Hannah Laycock (1758–1831), the wife of Quartermaster Thomas Laycock (1756–1809), in 1804. Prior to the creation of the locality name, it was part of Earlwood.

Frederick Moore Clements, who became wealthy from selling the family health restorer, Clements Tonic, owned 40 acres (160,000 m^{2}) near William Street until his death in 1920. 'Clementon Park' was an early suggestion for the suburb's name but records show Clemton Park was used from 1925. The name was created as part of a campaign to lobby for an extension of the tram line from the terminus at Earlwood. It was approved as a locality name by Canterbury Council in 1925. It was designated by the Geographical Names Board as a "neighbourhood" name in 1977 until 1993. It became an official suburb, separate from Earlwood, in 2000.

== Demographics ==
At the 2021 census, there were 1,676 residents in Clemton Park. In Clemton Park, 57.3% of people were born in Australia. The most common countries of birth were China 7.5%, Greece 7.3%, Lebanon 2.9%, Portugal 2.3% and Vietnam 2.0%. Family households (74.9%) were the main type of household, with 23.8% single person households and 1.3% group households.

== Facilities ==
Most of the institutions, shops and facilities named or associated with "Clemton Park" are situated outside the suburb boundaries, including the eponymous Clemton Park, located on Moorefields Road in neighbouring Kingsgrove. It is the home ground of the Earlwood Wanderers Cricket Club 6th-grade team of 2013–14.

Clemton Park Public School is located on Bexley Road in neighbouring Earlwood.

Within the boundaries of Clemton Park itself, there is a small park called Yatama Park. Campsie South Bowling and Recreation Club is located adjacent to Yatama Park.
