= Kingsgrove =

- Suburb
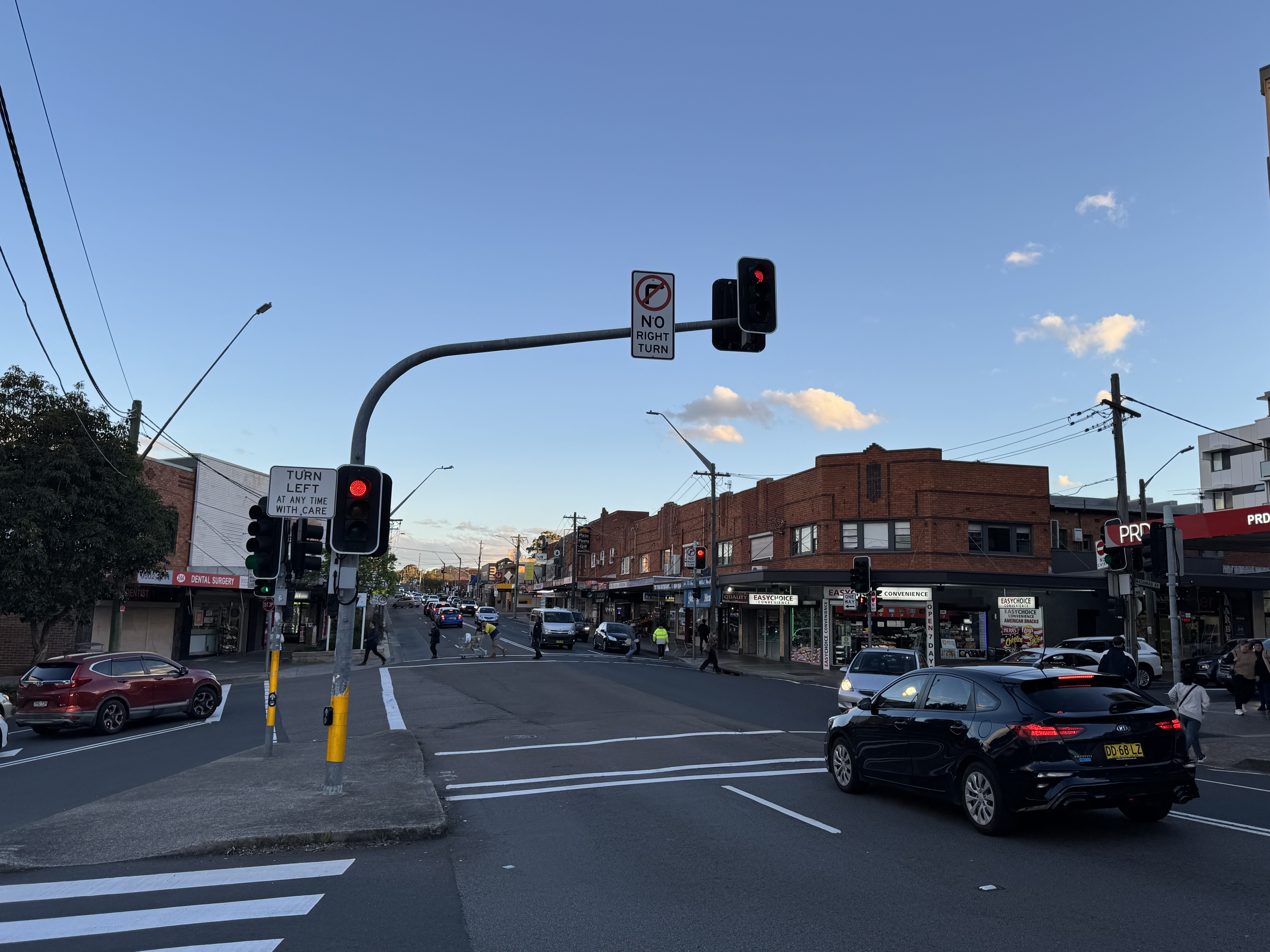
- Kingsgrove Road

- Interactive map of Kingsgrove
- Country: Australia
- State: New South Wales
- City: Sydney
- LGAs: Bayside Council; Georges River Council; City of Canterbury-Bankstown
- Location: 13 km (8.1 mi) SW of Sydney CBD

Government
  - State electorates: Kogarah; Canterbury
  - Federal divisions: Barton; Watson
- Elevation: 28 m (92 ft)

Population
  - Total: 12,881 (2021 census)
- Postcode: 2208
Suburbs around Kingsgrove
Roselands	Belmore, Clemton Park	Earlwood
Beverly Hills	Kingsgrove	Bexley North
Hurstville	Hurstville	Bexley

Kingsgrove is a suburb in Southern Sydney, New South Wales, Australia. Kingsgrove is 13 kilometres (8.1 mi) south-west of the Sydney central business district and lies across the local government areas of the City of Canterbury-Bankstown, Bayside Council and the Georges River Council.

== History ==
Governor Philip King granted 500 acres (2 km^{2}) in 1804 to Hannah Laycock (1758–1831), the wife of Quartermaster Thomas Laycock (1756–1809). She named the farm King's Grove in Governor King's honor. This was later simplified to Kingsgrove. The area would be now bounded by Kingsgrove Road, Bexley Road and William Street. Governor King made Thomas Laycock an officer of merit and recommended him to fill the vacancy an ensign in the New South Wales Corps. Two of their sons, William and Samuel were also given land grants of 100 acres (0.4 km^{2}) each in the same area in 1804 and Hannah received another 120 acres (0.5 km^{2}) in 1812. The entire 820 acres (3.3 km^{2}) of Kingsgrove farm when sold to Simeon Lord in 1829, extended from Campsie and Clemton Park to Stoney Creek Road.

The first inn built in the area was the Man of Kent on Kingsgrove Road, near Morris Avenue and was licensed on 1 July 1850. The licensee Evan Evans, was formerly a sea captain. In 1856, Thomas Smithson, a tobacco manufacturer from Leeds, England, established the Cooks River Tobacco Manufactory on Stoney Creek Road. He marketed snuff and cigars into Sydney until the 1880s. One of Thomas’ sons, James Edward Smithson, made and sold wine from Smithson's Wine Bar on the site of today's Bexley Golf Course. Kingsgrove railway station opened in 1931 and development in the area followed.

In 1908, Frederick Mashman acquired over eight acres of land to establish Mashman's Pottery, taking advantage of the area's rich clay deposits. The pottery works operated as a major local industry in Kingsgrove for over a century until it closed its doors to the public in 2010.

== Commercial area ==
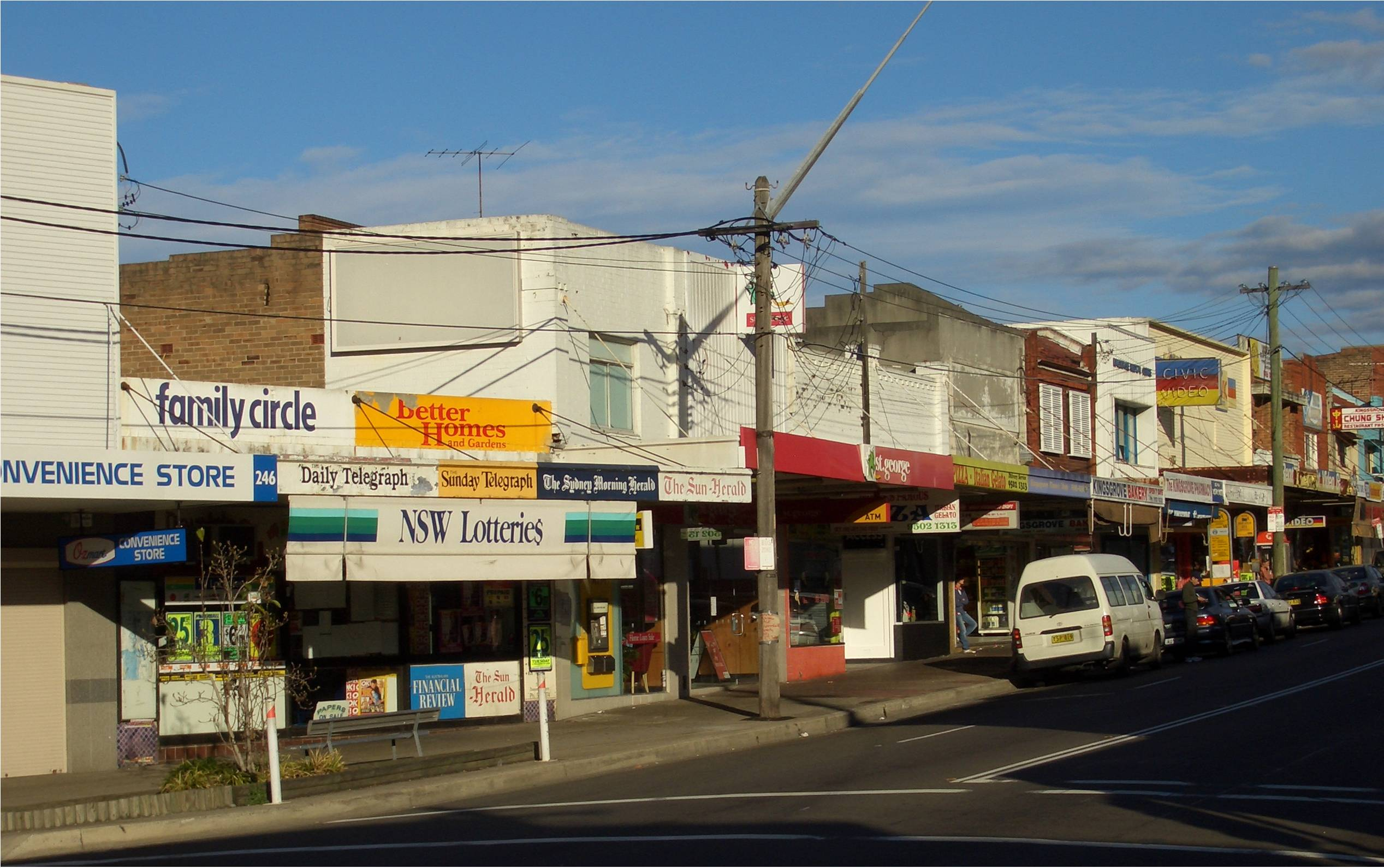
Kingsgrove Road (east)

The main shopping centre is located on Kingsgrove Road, south of Kingsgrove railway station. Commercial and industrial developments are located on the northern side of the railway line, west of Kingsgrove Road. There are also some commercial developments scattered along Stoney Creek Road and Canterbury Road. A small group of shops on Stoney Creek Road is known as the Kingsway locality. Kingsgrove RSL Club is located in Brocklehurst Lane behind Kingsgrove Road.

Kingsgrove Road features a variety of food outlets, gift stores, restaurants, cafes, hair salons and services such as Solicitors, Banks, Accountants and General Practitioners. There is also a Woolworths supermarket, a Bunnings Warehouse and three petrol stations in the area.

== Transport ==
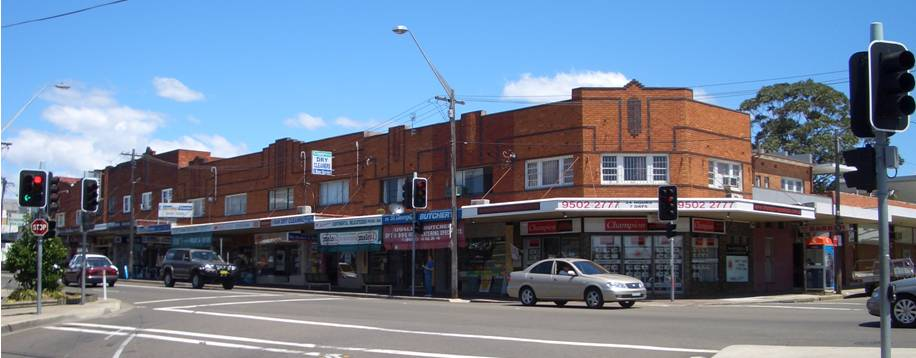
Kingsgrove Road (west)

Kingsgrove is well connected to both the road and public transport network.

Kingsgrove Road has entrance and exit ramps for the M5 Motorway, with access towards Sydney Airport and the Sydney central business district. The western end of the M8 Motorway also exits onto the M5 in Kingsgrove. Moorefields Road and William Street are other main roads in the suburb.

Kingsgrove railway station is on the T8 Airport Line of the Sydney Trains network. This line provides direct access to both the Sydney CBD and Sydney Airport.

There are two bus depots in the suburb - one for services operated by Transit Systems and the other for services operated by U-Go Mobility. Bus routes 423 and 423X link Kingsgrove to the Sydney central business district via Earlwood, Marrickville and Newtown.

There are other direct local bus connections to Campsie, Hurstville, Kogarah, Rockdale, Roselands Shopping Centre, Earlwood and Burwood on the 446, 455, 490, 492 and 493 routes. The NightRide N20 bus route also supplements late night T8 train services to Riverwood via Beverly Hills and the City - Town Hall via Rockdale, Arncliffe and Mascot.

== Demographics ==
In 2021 Census, there were 12,881 people in Kingsgrove. 56.6% were born in Australia. The next most common countries of birth were China 7.9%, Greece 5.2%, Lebanon 2.5%, Vietnam 2.2% and Italy 1.9%.

The most common ancestries were Greek 20.3%, Chinese 19.1%, Australian 13.2%, English 10.7% and Lebanese 8.2%.

40.8% of people spoke only English at home. Other languages spoken at home included Greek 15.3%, Cantonese 7.9%, Mandarin 6.8%, Arabic 6.8%, and Italian 2.9%. The most common responses for religious affiliation were Catholic (26.6%), Orthodox (22.6%), No Religion, 20.1%, Islam 7.3% and Not stated 4.9%.

== Notable residents ==
- Chris Cahill - footballer
- Alex Perry - Fashion Designer and Television Personality

== Schools ==
- Kingsgrove Public School
- Kingsgrove High School
- Kingsgrove North High School
- Our Lady of Fatima Catholic School
- Saint Ursula's College, Kingsgrove
- All Saints Grammar Secondary

== Churches ==
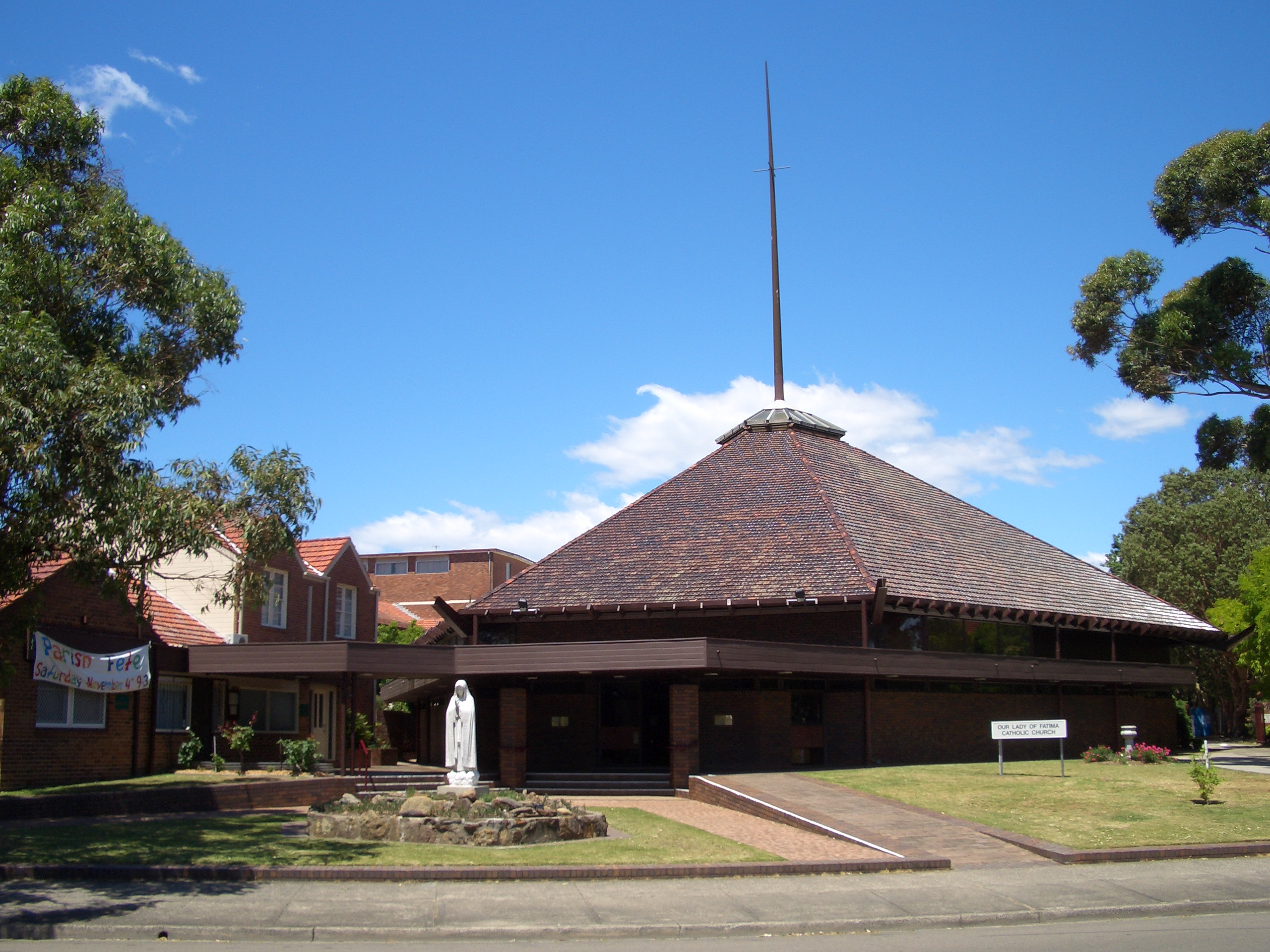
Our Lady of Fatima Catholic Church, Kingsgrove

- Our Lady of Fatima Catholic Church
- South West Evangelical Church (St Thomas War Memorial Anglican Church)
- Kingsgrove ADD Church Australia (Assembleia de Deus - Assemblies of God)
- Tin Lành Vietnamese Evangelical Church
- Kingsgrove Christian Brethren Church
- Kingsgrove Chinese Christian & Missionary Alliance Church
- Kingsgrove Every Nation Christian Church Sydney South
- Kingsgrove Greek Evangelical (Free) Church
- St Bede's Anglican Church (Beverly Hills with Kingsgrove) [Anglican Church]

== Parks and recreation ==
Parks in the suburb include Beaumont Park, Kingsgrove Avenue Reserve, Smith Reserve, Dowsett Park, Butler Reserve and Beverly Grove Reserve.
