= Earlwood Aboriginal Art Site =

- Location: Earlwood, New South Wales, Australia

New South Wales Heritage Register
- Official name: Earlwood Aboriginal Art Site; Aboriginal Art and Midden
- Type: state heritage (archaeological-terrestrial)
- Designated: 27 November 2009
- Reference no.: 1801
- Type: Art site
- Category: Aboriginal

Earlwood Aboriginal Art Site is a heritage-listed Aboriginal cultural site at Earlwood, Earlwood, a suburb in Sydney, Australia. It is also known as Aboriginal Art and Midden. It was added to the New South Wales State Heritage Register on 27 November 2009.

== History ==
Prior to European settlement the Cooks River Valley was the home of a number of clans of the Aboriginal people. The Gameygal lived on the northern side of Botany Bay, between present day La Perouse and the mouth of the Cooks River. To the north of the Cooks River between South Head and present day Darling Harbour lived the Cadigal people and the Wangal people lived in an area between the Parramatta River and the Cooks River from Darling Harbour to Rose Bay. To the south of Botany Bay in the coastal area including Kurnell and Cronulla and the south coastal strip to Nowra lived the Gweagal people. While there is some argument about the location of land of the Bidiagal clan, there is some evidence that this clan lived in the area between the southern bank of the Cooks River and the northern bank of the Georges River. It is also thought the Cooks River formed the boundary between two dialect groups, the Bidiagal and the Gweagal. Previous reports on the Aboriginal past of the area where the Art site is located have suggested that it was occupied by the Bidiagal. The potential association of the Bidiagal people with the site should not be discounted as a result of this lack of historical detail as after the collapse of the clan structure due to the smallpox epidemic of 1788 and general impact of European invasion, individuals travelled beyond the pre-1788 traditional boundaries.

While the age of the midden and rock paintings is at present unknown as no archaeological investigation has been conducted, it is accepted that the site was regularly used by the Aboriginal people of the local area as they travelled between sites of ceremonial importance and sources of food and water that changed with the seasons. It is thought that the warmer months were spent nearer the coast and the cold months of winter were spent further inland.

Throughout Australia traditional Aboriginal people practised art making in the places on their land that they visited in their seasonal travels. Rock art includes engraving, painting using ochres and charcoals, hand printing and stencilling of hands, feet and objects such a boomerangs, small animals kangaroo paws etc. Hand stencils and prints are the most common and feet appear to be the least common motifs for stencilling. The art site at Earlwood contains stencilled hands and feet. The stencils were made by spraying from the mouth a mixture of white ochre and water over an individual's hand.

It is not known with certainty why traditional Aboriginal people made stencils or other art on particular rock formations although discussion with Aboriginal people has indicated that it is highly likely that the reasons differed from region to region throughout Australia. Possible motivations for the practise include that it may have been a way of indicating that the group had been in that place and where they had moved on to or that art was made as part of a ritual or ceremony held in that place. Alternatively stencilling may have been done to show a person's or group's bond with an area of land. The making of artwork and stencils may have been a way of connecting with ancestral beings, embodied in the natural features of the country including rock outcrops such as the one in Earlwood. The practise of stencilling may have been the way in which older, initiated members of a group introduced the ancestral being to younger group members. The initiated members stencilled the forearm and hands on the rock embodying their ancestors and younger members had their only their hands stencilled. The foot stencils are a rare phenomena and the significance of these cannot be definitely determined although they may indicate direction or were casual occurrences.

While land closer to the town of Sydney was relatively quickly carved up as land grants to settlers in the first years of the European colony, the land on the southern side of the Cooks River was not subject to land granting until 1904. It was not until 1808 when a number of very large land grants were made over land which traditionally provided Aboriginal people access to the resource rich area of the Georges River, Kurnell Bay and Salt Pan Creek that land became the reason for conflict between the Bidiagal and European settlers. In 1809, an attack was made on two farms at Punchbowl led by a Bidiagal man named Tedbury. Tedbury was the son of Pemulway who had led perhaps the best known campaign of resistance in the Sydney Basin including a spear attack on Governor Phillip's game keeper, a man renowned for his hostility to the Aboriginal people of the Sydney area. Pemulway and Tedbury spoke the Bidiagal dialect, and are known to have come from around Botany Bay.

The attack at Punchbowl was the last reported act of Aboriginal resistance to European settlement in the Cooks River Valley. In the following years as a result of alienation from their land and its resources and being subject to the devastation of European infectious diseases, the Aboriginal population in the area dramatically reduced. In 1845 it was reported to the New South Wales Legislative Select Committee that there were only 3 people of the Botany Bay clan and only fifty Aboriginal people were living in the area between the Cooks and Georges River.

During the 19th Century European settlers transformed the land along both banks of the Cooks river as farms were established for grazing and raising a family's food needs, and also for other industries such as tanning, production of sugar, the harvesting of timber, and also the production of lime from the many middens which had been left by the Aboriginal people of the area for thousands of years. Lime was a scarce and necessary commodity for European settlement in the early year s of the colony.

The part of Earlwood in which the Aboriginal Art site is located was bought at auction between 1835 and 1836 by Abraham B. Pollack. Polack acquired the eight grants totalling 790 acres (320 ha). By the 1880s the estate was being subdivided and the area subsequently became increasingly urbanised.

Despite the disturbance of the environment there is abundant evidence of pre-contact Aboriginal occupation of the area including the rock art and midden site. The rock art site was first recorded by the National Parks and Wildlife Service (NPWS) in 1974 and a later anonymous drawing of the rock art site is dated c.1970.

== Description ==
The Aboriginal Art site at Earlwood comprises a midden in a rock shelter with stencils of hands and feet on the rock walls of the shelter. There are 23 white hand stencils, two of which also depict forearms. Also included are two white foot stencils, a rare occurrence in the Sydney area and throughout Australia. The Midden is largely undisturbed although soil and rubbish lie on top of the midden.

The site is situated within the context of a rock outcropping from the sandstone ridgeline which dominates the landscape on the south side of the Cooks River valley at Earlwood.

The art is situated inside the rock shelter, which is open on its north side, looking out over the Cooks River valley. The midden deposit is situated at the mouth and on the floor of the rock shelter. Mature plantings which previously screened the rock shelter have been removed, exposing the rock shelter and midden to the elements. The site suffers from weed growth, in particular the midden deposit, which has been disturbed (at least at the surface) by the manual removal of weeds.

The painted stencil art is situated on the walls inside the rock shelter. The first formal recording of the site was made in 1974 by NPWS. The recording was not detailed, possibly due to obscuring vegetation, and noted only "5 very faint hand stencils, some very indistinct charcoal lines".

An informal recording of the site by a former neighbour was conducted prior to this (c.1970), and recorded at least 10 hand stencils within the rock shelter. A more detailed recording, including survey sheet, drawing and photographs, was made in 1979. The 1979 recording noted that there were 23 white hand stencils, of which two also showed the forearms. The recording also noted 2 foot stencils. The recorder noted that stencils at the south end of the shelter were covered by dust, and were therefore not fully recorded, and that potentially more stencils would be found in that area under the dust. The 1979 recording also noted that the shell midden was probably about 4 feet deep, was littered with rubbish, but generally undisturbed at that time. Observed shells included Anadara trapezia (Sydney Cockle), Pyrazus ebeninus (Hercules' Club Whelk) and Crassostrea commercialis (Sydney Rock Oyster). The recording also noted that a former neighbour had collected about 20 stone flakes from the site (prior to NPWS legislation protecting Aboriginal relics).

The most recent formal investigation of the site was conducted for the purposes of a 2005 Archaeological Assessment. The Assessment noted that the site's condition "appears similar to that observed on previous visits - although the midden deposit may be more disturbed than previously noted". In addition to the shell species previously observed, the Assessment also noted the presence of Trichomya hirsuta (Hairy Mussel). The Assessment noted the presence of Sydney cockle and whelk shells on the surface elsewhere on the site, but in the context of building debris, and likely to have been moved downhill (by erosion or other disturbance). The Assessment indicated that "the rock shelter was probably the focus of midden making/consumption activity in the landscape", and therefore a curtilage 15 metres (49 ft) from the rear boundary would include "all possible locations at the front of the shelter where intact deposit may be located sub-surface".

Having regard to the painted stencils, the 2005 Assessment recorded what is possibly a third foot stencil. The Assessment noted that the site "would benefit from a detailed recording (including hand and foot stencil measurements and proper description, and the relationship between the motifs being recorded)".

=== Condition ===
As at 11 June 2009, the site has been deteriorating over time due to a lack of protection and poor site management practices. The midden deposit has been disturbed by erosion and the manual removal of invasive weeds. The visibility of the stencils within the shelter has deteriorated over time (observation based upon comparison with the 1970s recordings and subsequent records of site visits by Council officers). This process appears to have accelerated since screening vegetation was removed from around the rock shelter. Though it has been disturbed, the depth of the midden deposit is uncertain, and is likely to have archaeological potential. An Archaeological Assessment of the site has indicated that archaeological potential is restricted to the area identified as the curtilage for the site. Though shell fragments have been observed mid-slope and at the street frontage of the property, these have been stray finds likely resulting from erosion and other disturbance. The 1979 recording of the site noted that a former neighbour had once collected stone tool fragments from the site. There is no record of flaked stone tools or debitage being observed on the site since then.

=== Modifications and dates ===
The phasing of the painted stencils is uncertain, i.e. whether they were produced within a discrete period of time, or whether they were the product of several phases of painting over a longer period of time. The date(s) of the midden and rock art cannot be ascertained without further investigation. None of the art indicates evidence of contact with Europeans.

=== Further information ===
The surface of the midden deposit has been disturbed by erosion and the manual removal of weeds. The painted stencils have not been physically harmed by vandalism, though litter has been observed within the rock shelter. The visibility of the paintings however has deteriorated due to weathering as a result of the lack of protective screening. Expert advice is required to determine whether the effects of weathering can be reversed in order to recover and preserve the stencils.

Anecdotal information indicated that there were other Aboriginal sites on adjoining properties, including engravings on a rock surface at the top of the cliff directly behind the site, but which had been destroyed by development at least by 1979.

== Heritage listing ==
As of 6 September 2013, the Aboriginal art site at Earlwood is of State heritage significance as evidence of Aboriginal occupation of the area prior to European settlement. Comprising a rockshelter, midden, and stencil work, the site provides insight into the life and culture of the Bidigal people prior to European contact. It is an example of a surviving occupation site in an urbanised setting.

The Aboriginal art and midden site at Earlwood is of State significance as both a rare and representative example of painted stencil art including foot stencils, from the Sydney basin, providing a basis for cross comparison with other regional styles across NSW.

The site is exceptionally rare within the local area, being the only one of its kind in the City of Canterbury, and is also rare within the central Sydney region and the State, both for its combination of art and midden deposit, and especially for the presence of rare foot stencils.

The site is historically and culturally associated with the Bidigal Aboriginal people.

The site has the a high potential to reveal archaeological data and thus increase the understanding of the site and similar sites and their integration into traditional Aboriginal life and culture. The midden deposit may contain artefacts, and evidence relating to diet and subsistence, and the environment of the Cooks River valley prior to European settlement. A detailed recording of the painted stencils may also have the potential to provide enhanced knowledge about the creation of stencil sites in the Sydney region and provide a basis of comparison with similar sites across NSW.

Earlwood Aboriginal Art Site was listed on the New South Wales State Heritage Register on 27 November 2009 having satisfied the following criteria.

The place is important in demonstrating the course, or pattern, of cultural or natural history in New South Wales.

The Aboriginal midden and art site at Earlwood is of State heritage significance as it provides strong evidence of Aboriginal occupation in this region from thousands of years prior to European settlement. The site is of State heritage significance as it not only provides evidence of an important period in the course of the history of NSW; it provides a unique and rare insight into the daily life and culture of Aboriginal people before European contact. The hand and foot stencils are evocative impressions made by individuals, working within a wider cultural framework. Discussion with Aboriginal people indicates that traditional Aboriginal people made stencils on particular rock formations for a variety of reasons including as a way of indicating that the group had been in that place and where they had moved on to or that it was done as part of a ritual or ceremony. Alternatively stencilling may have been done to show a person's or group's bond with an area of land. The making of artwork and stencils may have been a way of connecting with ancestral beings, embodied in the natural features of the country including rock outcrops such as the one in Earlwood. The practise of stencilling was the way in which older, initiated members of a group introduced the ancestral being to younger group members. The initiated members stencilled the forearm and hand on the rock embodying their ancestors and younger members had their only their hands stencilled. The foot stencils are a rare phenomena and the significance of these cannot be definitely determined although they may indicate direction or were accidental/ casual occurrences.

The site is significant beyond the City of Canterbury. It is part of the historical legacy of the Aboriginal people of the Sydney basin, and specifically, of the dialect groups (Bidiagal/Gweagal) who inhabited the Cooks and Georges River valleys and the Botany Bay area.

The place has a strong or special association with a person, or group of persons, of importance of cultural or natural history of New South Wales's history.

The Earlwood art site and midden is of heritage significance at State level through its association with the Aboriginal people who lived in the area prior to colonisation and whose numbers in the decades after contact were decimated through the alienation of their land and the impact of disease. It is impossible to attribute the creation of the painted stencils at the subject site to specific individuals. Nevertheless, they were created by individuals, and their handprints and footprints are highly personal relics of the original inhabitants of this land. These stencils, and the individuals who made them, can be regarded as representatives of their people as a whole, evocatively speaking for the heritage of the Aboriginal people of the Sydney basin, and of the Aboriginal people of New South Wales.

The place is important in demonstrating aesthetic characteristics and/or a high degree of creative or technical achievement in New South Wales.

The Earlwood rock shelter decorated with 21 painted hand stencils, 2 hand and forearm stencils and 2 foot stencils in white ochre is of State heritage significance for its aesthetic qualities as a fine and rare example of Aboriginal stencil art in an urbanised setting. The site is significant not only because of the presence of stencils, but because of the variation (hand, hand and forearm and foot stencils) displayed in the one site. The aesthetic significance of this site is enhanced due to the inclusion of the local, regional and state wide rarity of foot stencils in Aboriginal art.

The State heritage significance of this site is also derived from its landmark qualities which, although camouflaged in their current urban setting amidst intensive 20th Century housing development are still in place. The site is located high above the Cooks River in a "classic Hawkesbury Sandstone formation with cavernous weathering forming an overhang" (Aboriginal Heritage Office 2008 The shelter provided both a good camping place as demonstrated by the presence of the midden and a panoramic vista of the group's country. Its location made it an important site where the older members of the group could point out and explain the significant landscape features of their country to younger members of the group and signify their presence and activities through the making of art on the walls of the shelter. One such landscape feature, clearly visible from the site is the island in the Cooks River near the Tempe railway bridge. This island is part of the Pelican Dreaming story and is the place where the Pelican stepped through the river and left his footprint. "The next step he took was on the northern bank where he became the creator being, Baiame who then created the lands to the north and west of Botany Bay". It is one of very few surviving intact Aboriginal art sites in highly urbanised areas in the State which were integral to the life and custom of traditional Aboriginal people.

The place has a strong or special association with a particular community or cultural group in New South Wales for social, cultural or spiritual reasons.

The subject site is likely to be of State Heritage Significance to the Aboriginal groups of the local area the wider Sydney area and the State as a for it is a rare example of the living history of Aboriginal people form the pre-contact period to survive in a highly urbanised context. The stencils provide a very direct and personal associative linkage between contemporary Aboriginal people and those who used this site for thousand of years prior to European contact as they are an exact outline or portrait of the people who made these artefacts. They connect a "living culture of the past with the people of the present".

The site is of likely State Heritage significance through its important association with contemporary Aboriginal community. The site has been a source of education and pride for a number of groups including the students of Tranby College who visited the site in 1986 as part of the Site Curators' course. It has been repeatedly visited by the Officers of the Metropolitan Local Aboriginal Land Council, including Allen Madden who commented that "This shelter also reminds us if our traditions - of caring for country and maintaining links between people and the earth, the water and the animals".

The place has potential to yield information that will contribute to an understanding of the cultural or natural history of New South Wales.

The site is of State heritage significance as a rare example of an occupation site containing art and a midden site with a huge potential resource for research into the traditional Aboriginal culture. The midden may potentially yield archaeological information relating to the diet and subsistence practices of the Aboriginal people who created the midden, the age of the midden, and the local environment at the time. Anecdotal information which suggests that stone flakes were found on the site (pre-1974) raises the possibility that the midden and the site would also yield other examples if archaeologically investigated. (Note: there is no intention to excavate the midden deposit now or in the foreseeable future).

In addition the stencils on site have not been recorded in great detail. They therefore have the potential to yield further information via a more detailed recording which may locate further stencils as well as measurement information which may indicate the minimum number of individuals responsible, gender and age of the art makers and contribute greatly to the understanding of this site and similar sites across the State.

The research potential of this particular site is enhanced as the impact of urbanisation in the central Sydney area has resulted in the destruction of many similar sites in this region. Information from this site would provide important comparisons with material from sites related to the groups of Aboriginal people in Northern Sydney and other areas thus shedding light on the differences in custom and lifestyle between Central Sydney clans and those elsewhere.

Information that may be derived from this site is significant in providing information to contemporary Aboriginal people about the history of their people.

The place possesses uncommon, rare or endangered aspects of the cultural or natural history of New South Wales.

The Earlwood site is of State heritage significance as an extremely rare example of an occupation site which comprises a rock shelter with both midden deposit and painted stencils. The presence of the stencils mark it out as by far the most significant Aboriginal site in the local area, while the number of stencils, the presence of relatively rare forearm plus hand stencils and the very uncommon foot stencils, make it a rare site within the central Sydney region and the State. The other site demonstrating foot stencils is at Bantry Bay on the South Coast. This stencil uses red ochre making the white foot stencilled shelter in Undercliffe rare in terms of motif and stencil variation. The site is also significantly rare in its urban context and according to reliable sources is "one of only 5 rock shelters with pigment known and used in the wider central part of the Sydney basin" McDonald 2005)

The place is important in demonstrating the principal characteristics of a class of cultural or natural places/environments in New South Wales.

The subject site is considered to be a representative example of painted stencils in the Sydney region. As a representative example from this region, the site contributes to an appreciation of regional variations across NSW, and therefore has value at a State-wide level as a representative example for cross comparison.
