= Earlwood =

- Suburb
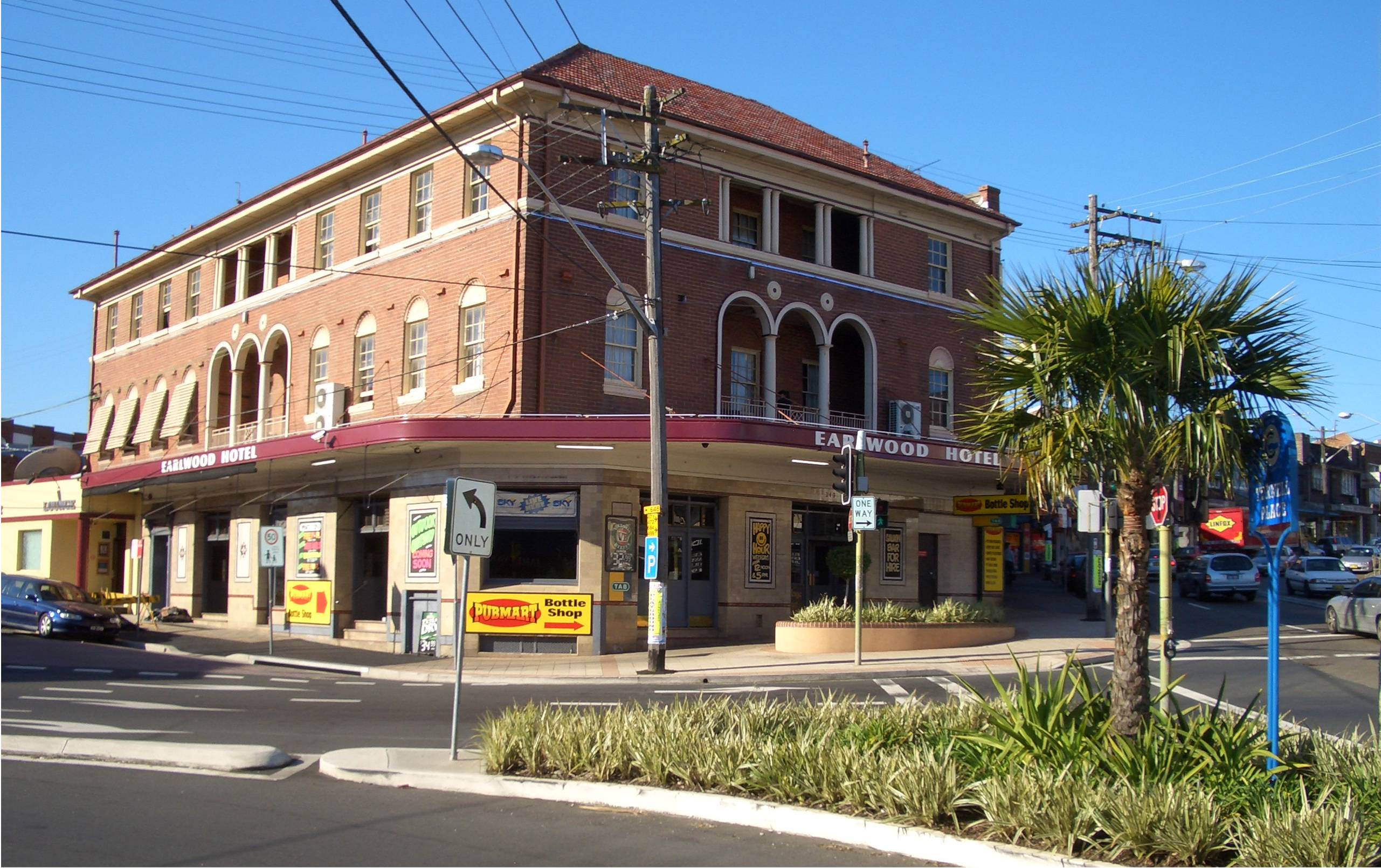
- Earlwood Hotel, Homer Street in 2006

- Interactive map of Earlwood
- Country: Australia
- State: New South Wales
- City: Sydney
- LGA: City of Canterbury-Bankstown
- Location: 10 km (6.2 mi) SW of Sydney CBD
- Established: 1829

Government
  - State electorate: Canterbury
  - Federal division: Barton
- Elevation: 51 m (167 ft)

Population
  - Total: 18,053 (2021 census)
- Postcode: 2206
Suburbs around Earlwood
Canterbury	Hurlstone Park	Marrickville
Clemton Park	Earlwood	Tempe
Kingsgrove; Bexley North	Bardwell Park; Turrella	Wolli Creek

Earlwood is a suburb of Sydney, in the state of New South Wales, Australia. Earlwood is located 10 kilometres south-west of the Sydney central business district, and is part of the Canterbury-Bankstown area. It is in the local government area of the City of Canterbury-Bankstown.

Earlwood stretches from the southern bank of the Cooks River to the northern bank of Wolli Creek. Wolli Creek (the suburb), Turrella and Bardwell Park lie to the south across Wolli Creek, while Canterbury, Hurlstone Park and Marrickville are located to the north and east across Cooks River. The locality of Undercliffe is part of the suburb. Clemton Park adjoins the suburb to the west. Earlwood is primarily residential with some commercial developments around the main road, Homer Street.

== History ==
=== Early history ===
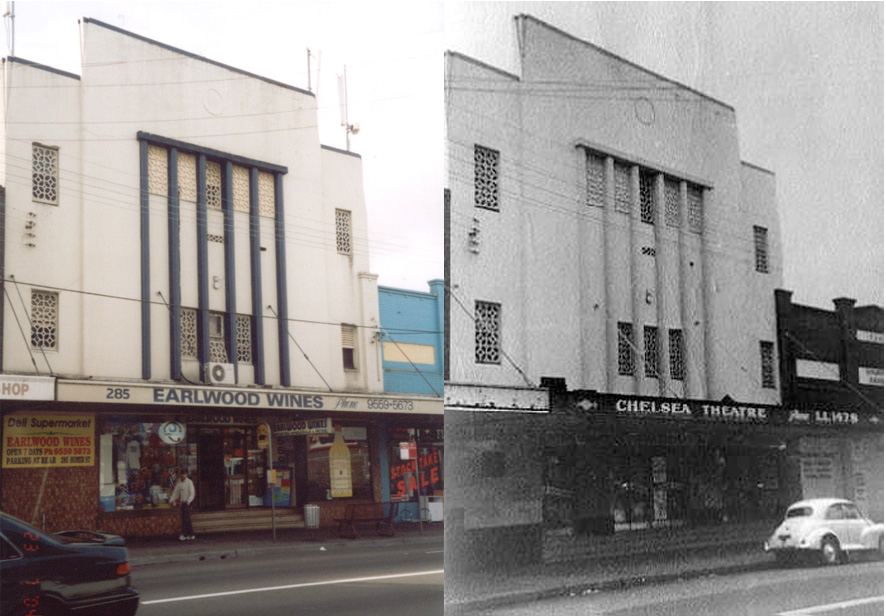
Earlwood Wines (left, 2000s) and Chelsea Theatre (right, 1950s)

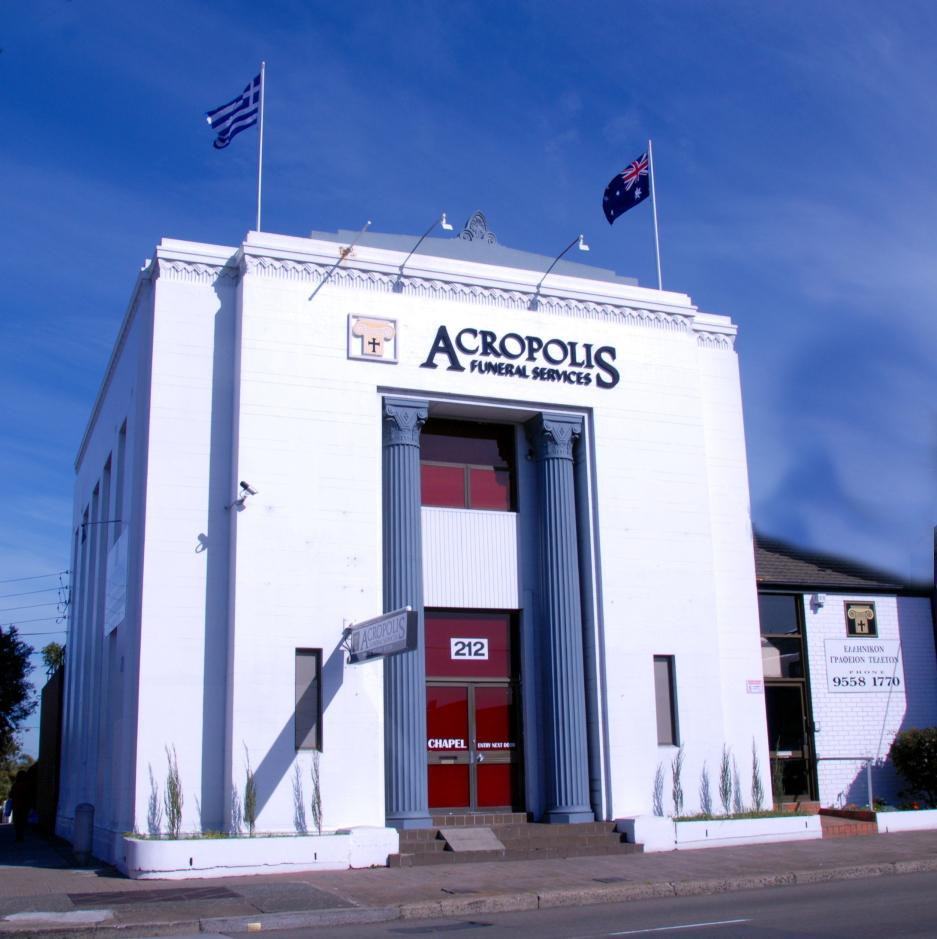
Acropolis Funeral services in former bank building in Homer Street

Earlwood began as a land grant obtained by John Parkes in 1827. John Parkes and his sons operated a logging camp called Parkes Camp in 1829 and felled the timber on his 50-acre grant. Later, it became known as Parkestown. The name was changed to Forest Hill around 1905-06 and changed again to Earlwood in 1918.

Frederick Wright Unwin, solicitor and director of the Australasian Sugar Company, obtained land in the Undercliffe area, east of Thorp's property, in 1840, and built his home, which he called Wanstead. Initially, a punt was used to cross the Cooks River. Later, a wooden bridge was built and the road eventually became known as Unwins Bridge Road. The name of the property survives in Wanstead Avenue and Wanstead Reserve.

=== Post-World War I history ===
After World War I, a war services subdivision was created west of Wardell Road for retired soldiers and their families. The streets of that subdivision commemorate the names of famous men and battles connected with the war, such as Kitchener, Hamilton, Vimy, Fricourt, Polygon, Thompson, Guedecourt and Flers. The area incorporating Bedford, River, Grove, Richmond, and Stone streets was a subdivision known as the Canterbury estate and was divided for workers of the quarry at the end of River Street. This estate also took in Louisa, Sparke, Caroline, Elsie and Ann streets and also Willow lane, some of the streets had different names to those that they are known by today. A notable occupant of the area was the Scott family which operated the Scotties tissue factory on the corner of Louisa and River Streets.

Between 1912 and 1957, electric trams operated along Homer Street to Earlwood, providing service to the city via Marrickville and Newtown. The service is now provided by buses. Since the 1960s, the area has had an increasing population of Greek ancestry.

== Heritage listings ==
Earlwood has a number of heritage-listed sites, including:

- Pine Street: Cooks River Sewage Aqueduct
- Unwin Street: Wolli Creek Aqueduct
- Earlwood Aboriginal Art Site

== Commercial area ==
The shopping centre is located on Homer Street. A Coles supermarket and shops are also located in nearby Clarke Street. Earlwood has a number of restaurants and cafes scattered amongst the retail outlets, including Greek, Thai and many other European establishments.

The site of the current KFC outlet was at one time the home of former prime minister John Howard, whose parents operated two fuel outlets in neighbouring Dulwich Hill. At one time, two cinemas were located on Homer Street, known as The Chelsea and The Mayfair. Some of the shopping centre buildings, churches and Chelsea Theatre were constructed by the builder William Ernest May formerly of 421 Homer Street.

The Earlwood Hotel is located on the corner of Earlwood Avenue and Homer Street. Earlwood-Bardwell Park RSL is located between Bardwell Park railway station and Wolli Creek. The club also manages the EBP Sports Bowling Club in Doris Street. The Earlwood ex-servicemens club which was located in Fricourt Avenue is now Earlwood Montessori Academy Child Care Centre.

Earlwood local library is located on the corner of William Street and Homer Street, with a heritage-listed post box outside the library.

== Transport ==
Earlwood is serviced by a number of bus routes by Transit Systems and U-Go Mobility.

Earlwood was previously the end of the line for electric tram services running on a similar route to that of the current 423 bus service, an extension from the bottom of the hill at Undercliffe.

There are no railway stations in Earlwood itself, but the stations Bexley North, Bardwell Park and Turrella on the East Hills railway line are adjacent to its southern border, across Wolli Creek. The stations Canterbury, Hurlstone Park and Dulwich Hill on the Bankstown railway line, and Tempe, on the Illawarra railway line, are nearby to the north and east, across the Cooks River. The interchange station Wolli Creek is also physically close, but is not easily accessible from Earlwood because no crossing is nearby on Wolli Creek.

== Churches ==
- Our Lady of Lourdes Catholic Church
- St Georges Anglican Church
- Earlwood Presbyterian Church
- Earlwood Uniting Church
- Earlwood Baptist Church
- The Salvation Army Earlwood
- The Transfiguration of Our Lord Greek Orthodox Church.
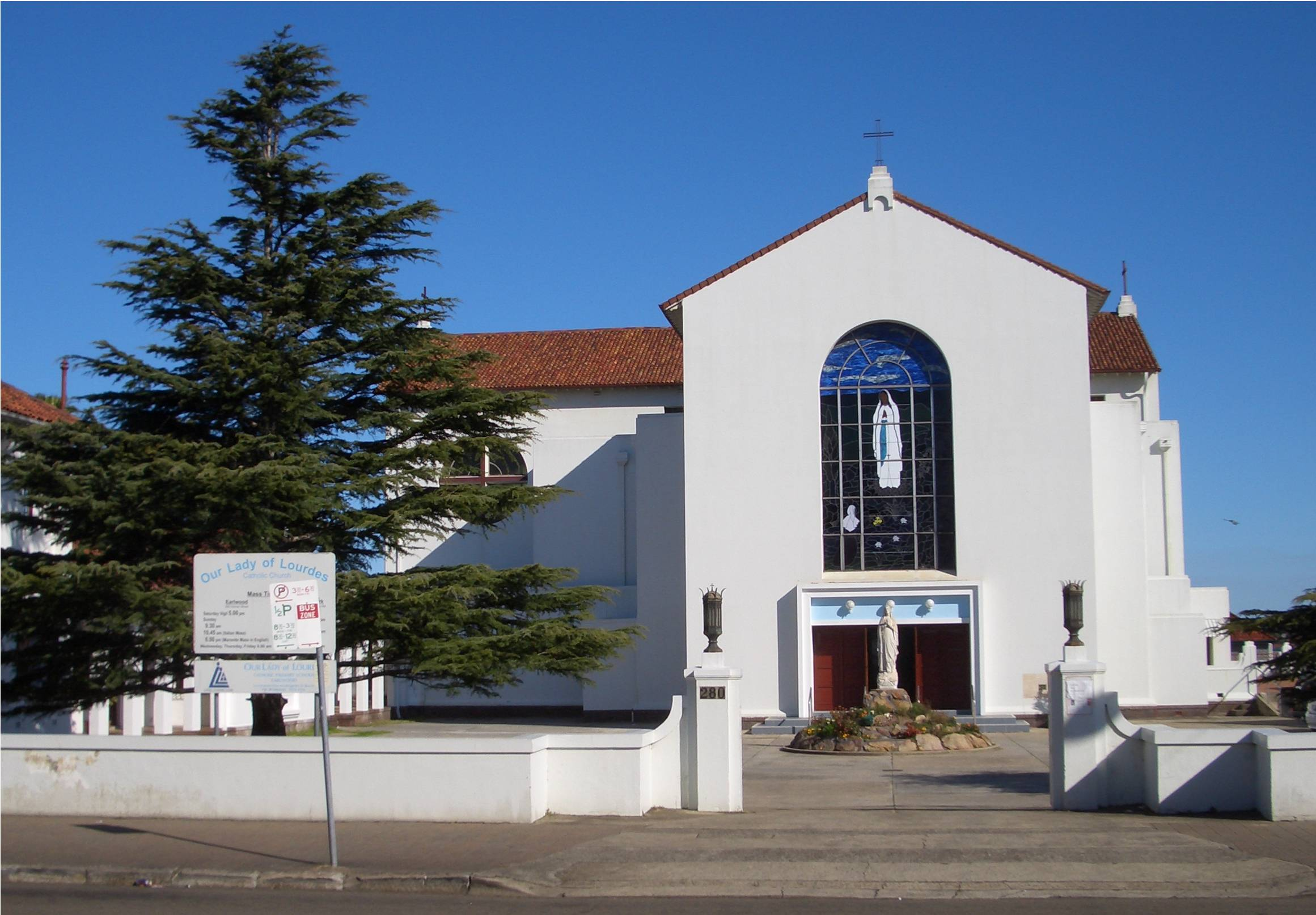
Our Lady of Lourdes Catholic Church

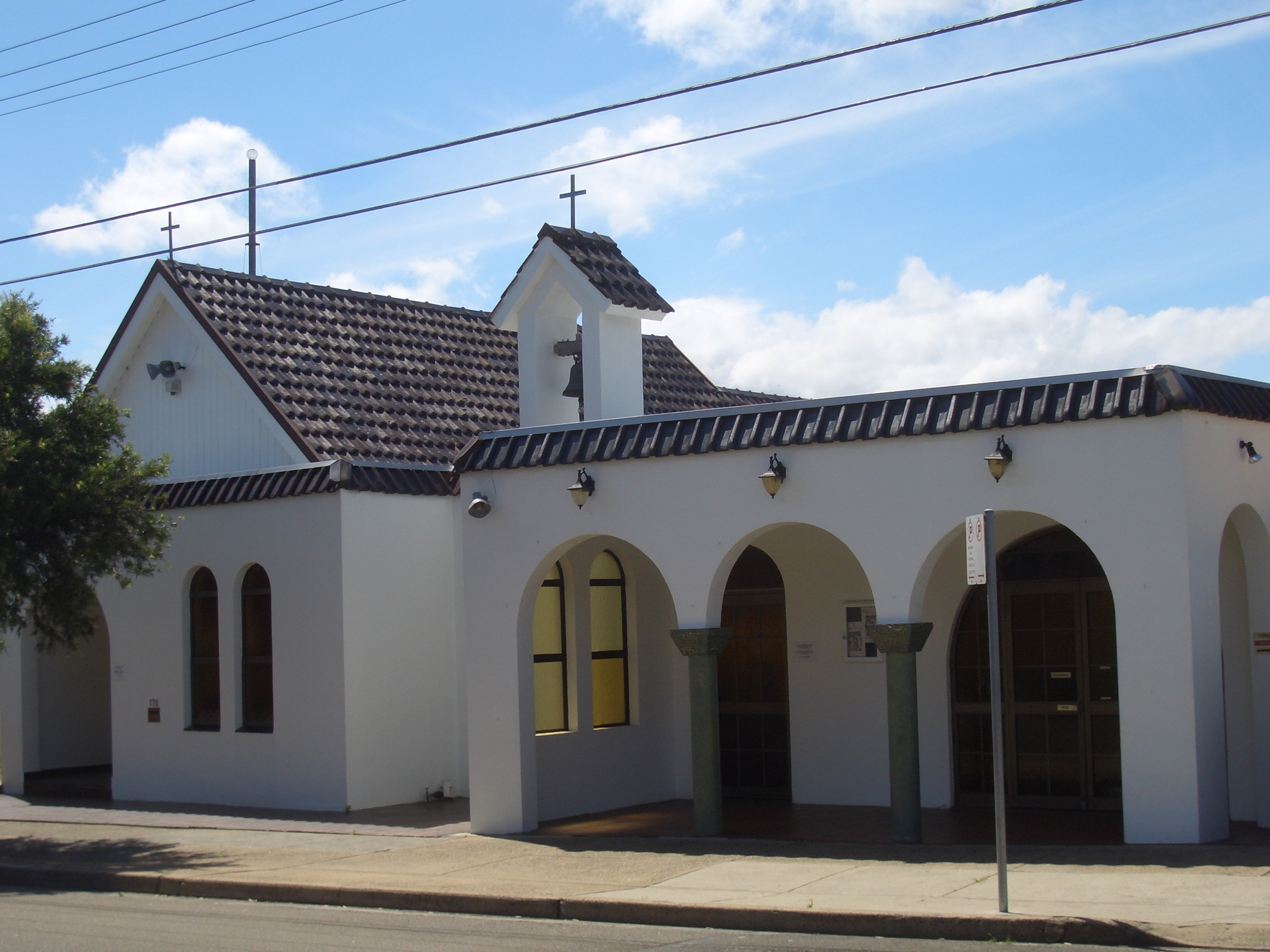
The Transfiguration of Our Lord Greek Orthodox Church

== Parks and gardens ==
- Gough Whitlam Park and Waterworth reserve are on Bayview Avenue near Tempe station. Canterbury bicycle velodrome is located nearby. Clean up Australia day was originated here on the banks of Cooks river. The Cooks river Festival is an annual event held in Gough Whitlam park.
- Heynes Reserve is a passive recreation area at the junction of the Cooks River and Cup and Saucer Creek.
- Sutton Reserve is adjacent to Heynes Reserve. It features a playground and is connected to the northern bank of the Cooks River by a wooden footbridge.
- Hughes Park is a sporting and multi-use area located near the Canterbury border and runs along a concrete canal leading to the Cooks River.
- Simpson Reserve is further west along the Cooks River.
- Beaman Park and Wills Ground are located further east along the river near Wardell Road, and offer sporting fields, bike paths and BBQ facilities. Beaman Park is also home to Earlwood Wanderers soccer club and Earlwood Saints rugby league club and Wills Ground is home to the Canterbury Rugby Union Club. Stafford Walk, passing through the park alongside the river, was named after Ailsie Stafford, a long-time member of the Cooks River Valley Association. A plaque was installed on 6 May 1980.
- Earlwood Oval is a local park and sporting ground. It also has historical and social importance as a long-standing home to one of the lawn bowls clubs, cricket club, soccer and football fixtures and the location of one of very few "rocket" type playground fixtures. Earlwood Oval also serves as the primary home ground for the football (soccer) club, Earlwood Wanderers.
- Girrawheen Park is a large recreational area along the northern bank of Wolli Creek. It has views over Arncliffe, Turrella and Bardwell Park. This area is heritage listed and covers a large area of rare remnant bushland along the banks of Wolli creek and played a large part in the reasoning behind the construction of a road tunnel beneath the Bardwell valley.
- Wanstead Reserve, located between Wanstead Avenue and the Cooks River, was named after Wanstead, the property of Frederick Wright Unwin, established in 1840.
- In the 1960s, Nanny Goat Hill (sometimes known as Prickly Pear Hill) was about to be quarried for use as fill in the construction of Sydney Airport runway extensions. Harold May, Peter Ridsdale and Carl Lyons formed a resistance committee to thwart the operation and succeeded in having Canterbury Council cancel the proposed destruction of this now valued recreation area. The Canterbury Mayor Jim Beaman was an advisor to the May, Ridsdale, Lyons committee. Beaman Park is named after him.
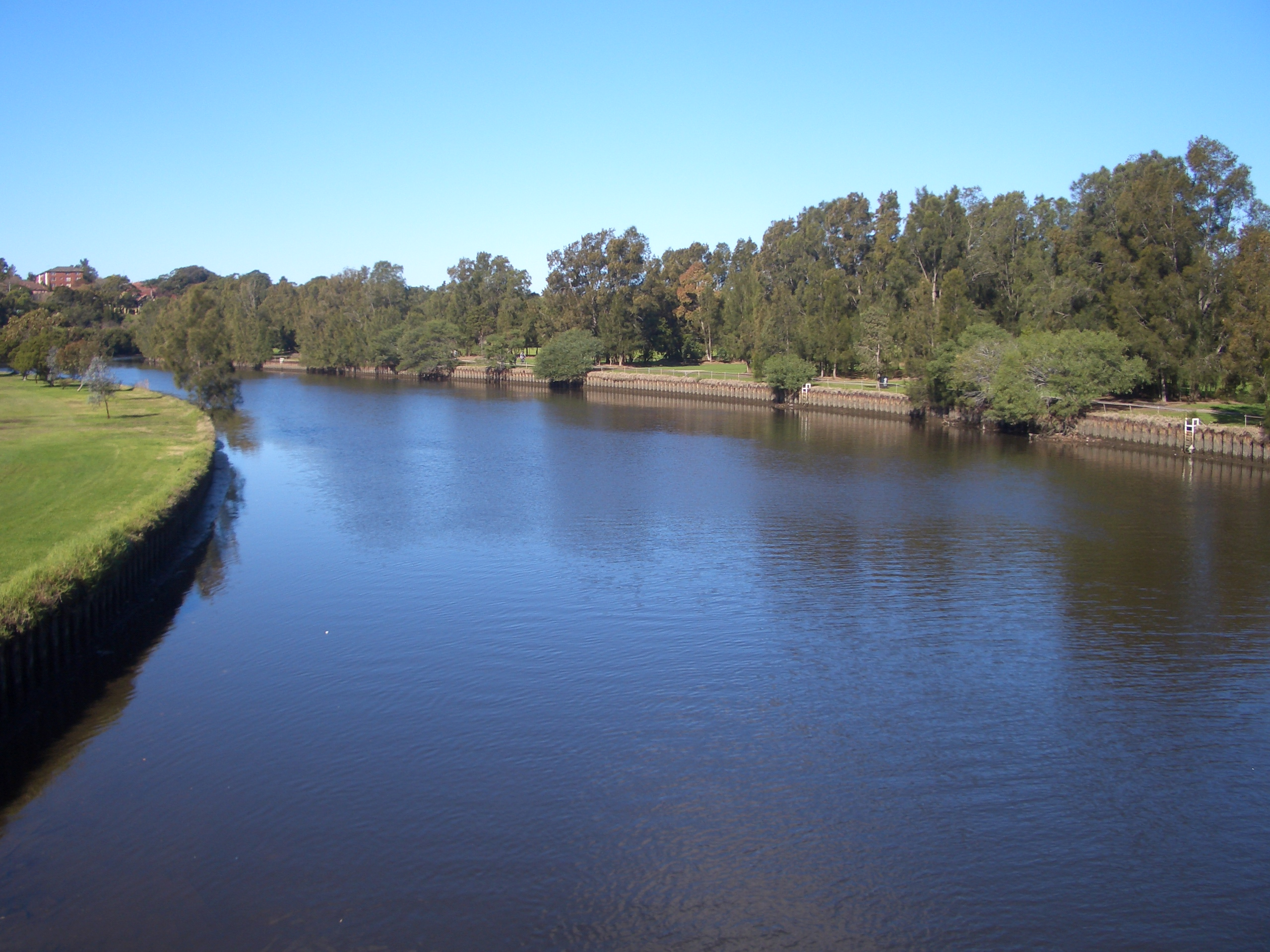
Cooks River, between Marrickville and Earlwood

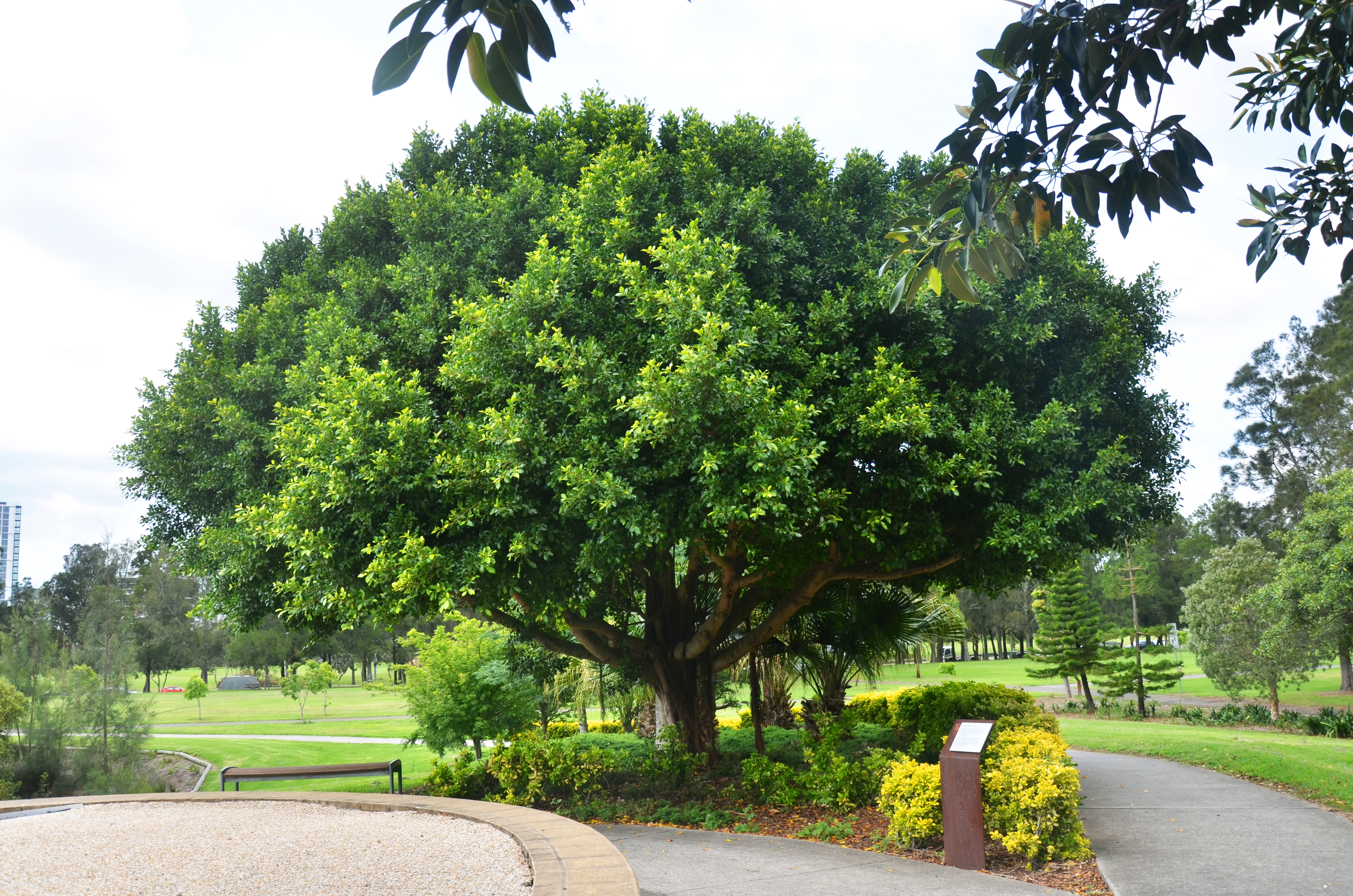
Tree at Gough Whitlam Park, Earlwood 2018

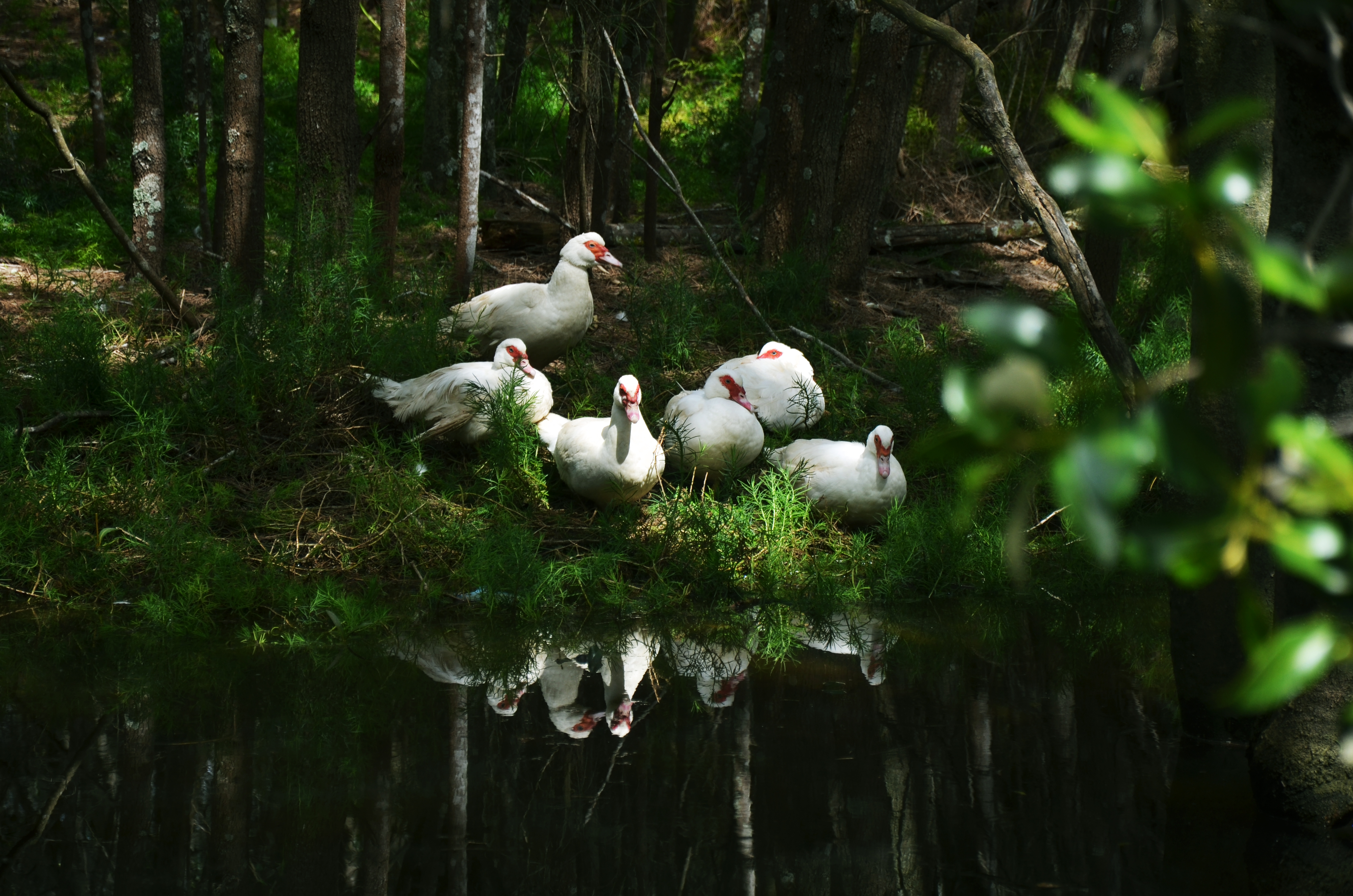
White ducks sunbathing at Gough Whitlam Park, Earlwood 2018

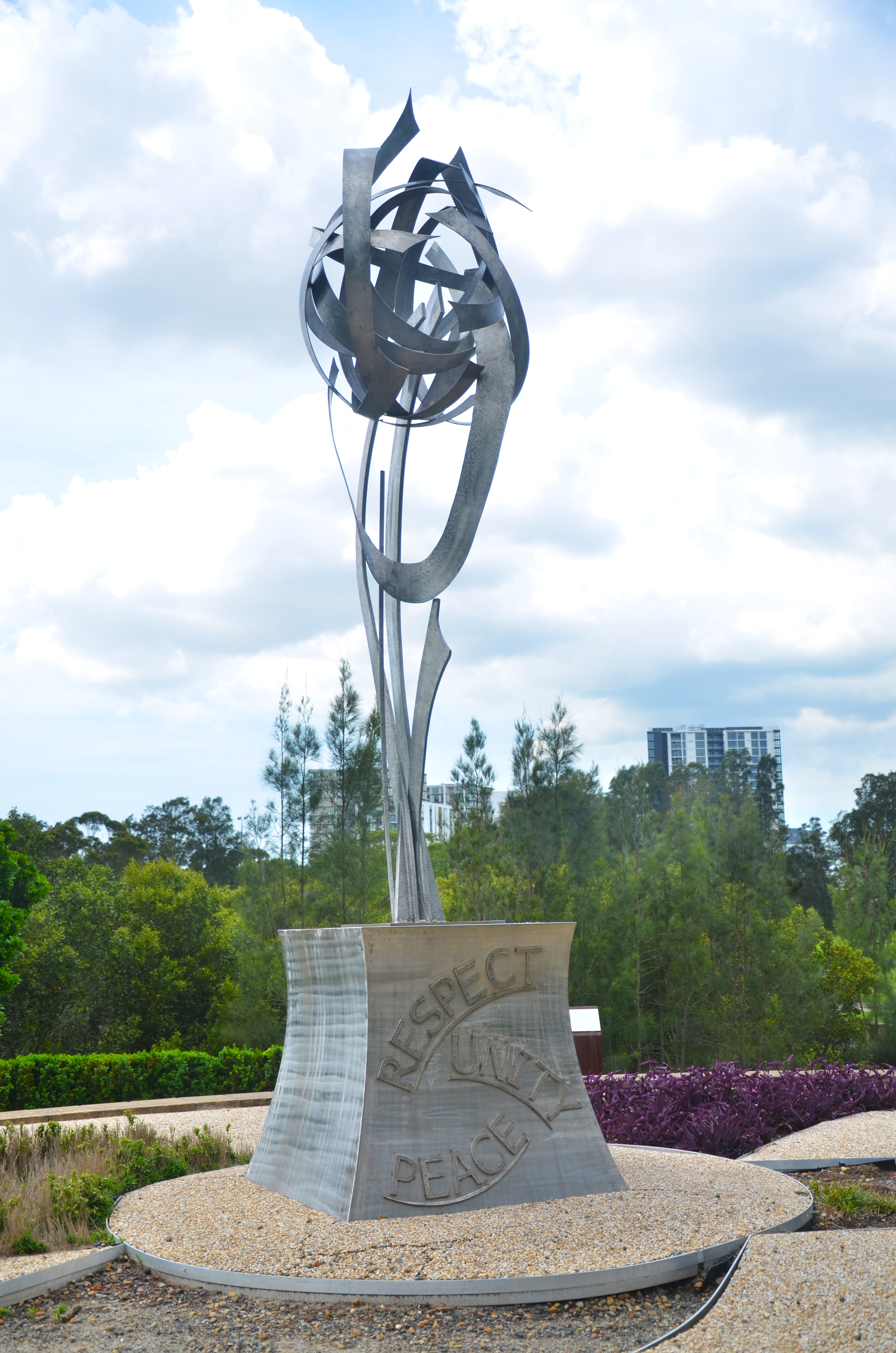
Statue of respect, unity & peace at Gought Whitlam Park 2018

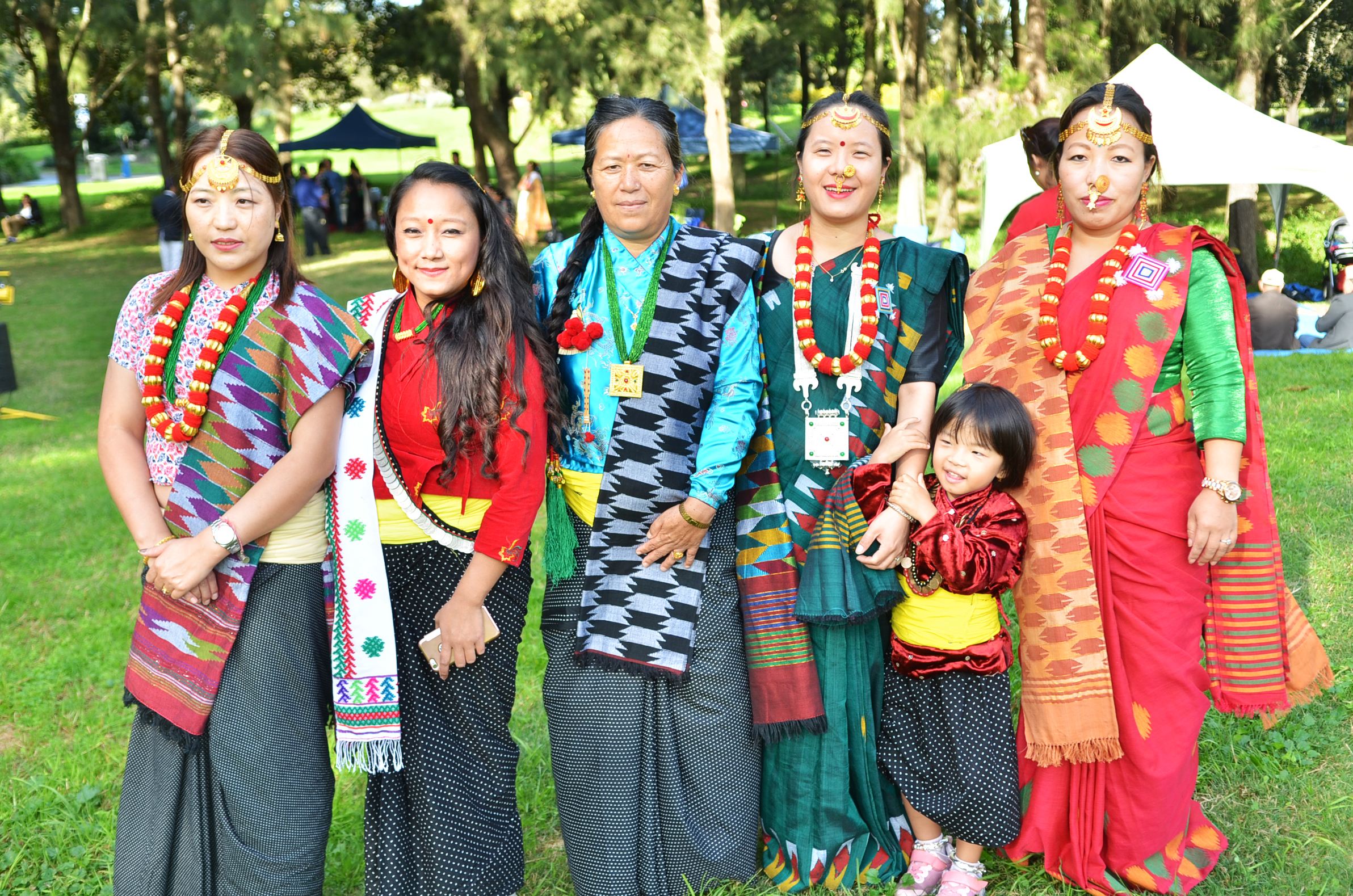
Women in traditional dress at Ubhauli Kirati festival 2017 at Gough Whitlam Park, Earlwood

== Demographics ==
Earlwood is a multicultural area, having a large proportion of Greek-Australians. Nearby Marrickville was a major centre of Sydney's Greek community in the 1950s and 1960s, but in the second half of the 20th century most of its Greek residents moved south and west into suburbs like Earlwood, Clemton Park, Bardwell Park, Kingsgrove and Bexley North (all of which have more than 15% of residents reporting Greek ancestry at the 2016 census), which offered larger family homes and blocks of land. 22.3% of the population of Earlwood reported Greek ancestry at the 2021 Census.

According to the 2021 census of Population, there were 18,053 residents in Earlwood. The most common reported ancestries were Greek 22.3%, Australian 16.9%, English 14.9%, Italian 9.0% and Lebanese 7.8%. 61.9% of people were born in Australia. The next most common countries of birth were Greece 7.4%, China 3.0%, Portugal 2.4%, Vietnam 2.4% and Lebanon 2.4%. 49.8% of people spoke only English at home. Other languages spoken at home included Greek 18.1%, Arabic 5.6%, Italian 3.4%, Vietnamese 3.2% and Portuguese 3.0%. The most common responses for religious affiliation were Catholic 29.0%, No Religion 24.4% and Orthodox 24.2%.

== Notable residents ==
The following notable people have lived in Earlwood:

- Josh Addo-Carr, rugby league player
- Jim Airey, motorcycle speedway rider
- Leigh Blackmore, horror writer and critic
- Grahame Bond, actor (The Aunty Jack Show)
- Alex Dimitriades, actor
- Blake Ferguson, former rugby league player
- Ken Gabb, former politician
- Courtney Houssos, politician
- Bob Howard, brother of John Howard, political scientist
- John Howard, former Prime Minister
- Lyall Howard, father of John Howard
- Murray Sayle, journalist

== Politics ==
Federal Government: Earlwood is in the Division of Barton in the Australian House of Representatives. Historically, the Division of Barton has been a bellwether electorate. It is currently held by the ALP.

State Government: Earlwood is in the Electoral district of Canterbury in the New South Wales Legislative Assembly.

Local Government: Earlwood is part of the Canterbury Ward of the City of Canterbury-Bankstown, which elects three councillors to the city council.

== Topography ==
The suburb of Earlwood stretches in the northeast from the tall escarpment on the south bank of the Cooks River at its junction with Wolli Creek, a locality called Undercliffe. It stretches west (upriver) along the southern bank of the Cooks River up to the junction of Cup and Saucer Creek, by which point the river bank becomes much flatter. Wolli Creek forms the boundary of the suburb to the south. The Airport & South Line runs along the valley of Wolli Creek in this area, just outside the boundary of Earlwood, and provides the nearest rail access for residents of the suburb. In the west, the local artery road Bexley Road forms the boundary between Earlwood and neighbouring Canterbury, Clemton Park and Kingsgrove.

== Region of Sydney ==
Although by most customary definitions Earlwood falls into the customary region of South Western Sydney or Canterbury-Bankstown, it sits at the far eastern end of that region. It is separated from Marrickville in the northeast by the Cooks River valley and parklands. Marrickville is part of the Inner West region, and so Earlwood is sometimes, especially in commercial contexts, identified as part of the Inner West region despite the geographical separation. Because Earlwood is also within the cadastral Parish of St George (used for land title purposes), it also falls within the St George region by the traditional definition.

Demographically, Earlwood is more similar to its neighbours in the west and south, in that it has a large proportion of residents of Greek heritage: Bardwell Park to the south (in the St George region) is also 18% Greek by ancestry, and Clemton Park to the west (in the Canterbury-Bankstown or South-Western Sydney region) is 19.8% Greek by ancestry. By contrast, Marrickville is only 6.6% Greek by ancestry, and has more residents born in Vietnam (6.0%) than Greece (4.2%).
