= Campsie railway station =

Railway station in Sydney, New South Wales, Australia

Campsie
- Platform, November 2026

General information
- Location: Beamish Street, Campsie; Australia
- Coordinates: 33°54′37″S 151°06′09″E
- Elevation: 32 metres (105 ft)
- Owner: Transport Asset Manager of New South Wales
- Operator: Sydney Trains (until 30 September 2024); Metro Trains Sydney (from 2026)
- Line: Metro North West & Bankstown Line
- Distance: 11.70 kilometres (7.27 mi) from Central
- Platforms: 4 (2 side, 1 island)
- Tracks: 4
- Connections: Bus

Construction
- Structure type: Ground
- Accessible: Yes

Other information
- Status: Staffed
- Station code: CMP
- Website: Transport for NSW

History
- Opened: 1 February 1895
- Closed: 30 September 2024
- Rebuilt: 30 October 2026

Passengers
- 2023: 3,488,340 (year); 9,557 (daily) (Sydney Trains, NSW TrainLink)

Services
Preceding station	Sydney Metro	Following station
Belmore towards Bankstown	M1 Metro North West & Bankstown Line	Canterbury towards Tallawong
Former services
Preceding station	Sydney Trains	Following station
Belmore towards Lidcombe or Liverpool	Bankstown Line (until 2024)	Canterbury towards City Circle
Location

Campsie railway station is a heritage-listed railway station on the Metro North West & Bankstown Line in the Sydney suburb of Campsie.

== History ==
Campsie station opened on 1 February 1895 when the Bankstown line opened from Sydenham to Belmore.

In 1915, the station was remodelled when the Metropolitan Goods line was built to the north of the existing lines. Platforms were provided that were used by railway workers' trains to Enfield South, Delec and Hope Street. These services ceased in 1996. These shorter platforms remain in situ, however with the Metropolitan Goods line not connected to the Sydney Trains network, are not used.

In 2001, a new booking office was opened on the footbridge.

In September 2002 a new concourse was complete including the addition of lifts.

The station was converted to Sydney Metro standards as part of Sydney Metro City & Southwest and closed on 30 September 2024 and reopened on 30 October 2026.

== Description ==
The station has two wide entrances from Beamish St, onto the concourse. Before the Opal ticketing system, the concourse had two large cash + card ticket machines, one card only machine and two ticket windows. All the former ticket machines were removed after paper tickets were phased out, replaced with two card only Opal topup machines. One of these machines can also issue single trip cards. The ticket windows are now permanently closed. Cash is not accepted for tickets or top up at this station, as there are several retailers (e.g. newsagents, Woolworths) nearby able to process Opal top ups.

The concourse is divided by a line of ticket gates of the older type, which originally made to process paper tickets, but now have Opal functionality added on. The station office and toilets are also located on the concourse. From the concourse, there is a lift and steps to each platform.

The left two tracks at Campsie are the Metropolitan Goods line. Just west of Campsie, they diverge from the Bankstown line and travel toward Enfield Yard. Platforms are provided for these lines, but they are not used and the platform for the Up Goods is not accessible to the public. The two platforms on the right are for the Bankstown line. There are crossovers east and west of the station, however these were not commissioned after being rebuilt in July 2021 and will likely stay out of use until the line is converted to metro operation in 2026.

Both platforms retain their old station buildings, but they are completely closed to the public. The buildings are mostly used as storerooms. Both platforms are also curved, meaning that the guard of a train on platform 2 needs to step off the train to see the whole train. The whole station is equipped with LCD screens and automated announcements showing train times.

== Platforms and services ==
Platform	Line	Stopping pattern	Notes
1	M1 Metro North West & Bankstown Line	services to Tallawong	
2	M1 Metro North West & Bankstown Line	services to Bankstown	

== Transport links ==
Transit Systems operates 10 bus routes via Campsie station, under contract to Transport for NSW:

- 410: Marsfield to Hurstville
- 412: to Martin Place via Earlwood, Dulwich Hill and Petersham
- 413: to Railway Square via Ashbury, Ashfield, Croydon Park, Lewisham & Annandale
- 415: to Chiswick via Burwood
- 420: Westfield Burwood to Mascot station via Sydney Airport.
- 445: to Balmain
- 473: to Rockdale via Earlwood and Arncliffe
- 487: Canterbury to Bankstown Central
- 490: Drummoyne to Hurstville
- 492: Drummoyne to Rockdale via Kingsgrove

U-Go Mobility operates one bus route from Campsie station, under contract to Transport for NSW:

- 942: to Riverwood

Campsie station is served by one NightRide route:

- N40: East Hills station to Town Hall station
