= Tivoli circuit =

Former Australian theatrical circuit

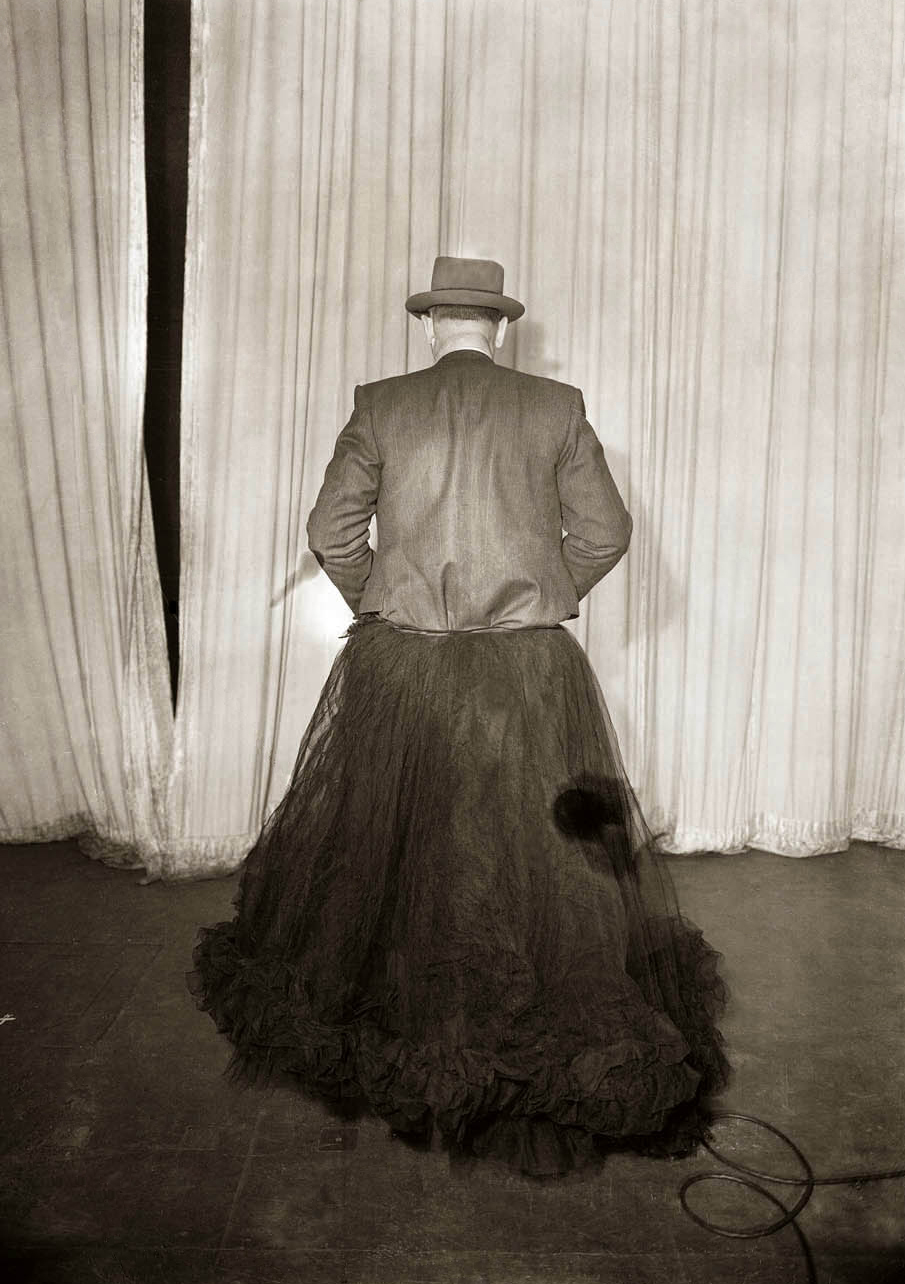
Back view of man (presumably a detective) in a tulle skirt behind a stage curtain. Found in an envelope marked 'Tivoli dressing room fire, 1945'.

The Tivoli Circuit was a successful and popular Australian vaudeville entertainment circuit featuring revue, opera, ballet, dance, singing, musical comedy, old time black and white minstrel and even Shakespeare which flourished from 1893 to the 1950s, and featured local and international performers from the United States and the United Kingdom.

The circuit suffered a catastrophic decline in popularity after the introduction of television in Australia in 1956, although embracing the new medium and feature live half hour broadcasts from Sydney. The last Tivoli show was staged in 1966 and the company briefly went into film exhibition in Melbourne. The Sydney building was leased out to various establishments until the building was demolished in 1969. The only original Tivoli theatre still standing is Her Majesty's Theatre, Adelaide.

== History ==
The circuit was established by English music hall baritone and comedian Harry Rickards in 1893, following the success of his "New Tivoli Minstrel and Grand Specialty Company" who performed at the old Opera House in Sydney in 1892. By 1909 Rickards had 532 people on the payroll.

The Circuit was taken over after Rickards' death in 1911 by a succession of managements, the first being Hugh D. Mclntosh, who in 1912 purchased the circuit for £100,000. After success with large-scale stage productions such as Chu Chin Chow he sold the Tivoli circuit to George Musgrove in 1921. It was subsequently acquired by J. C. Williamson Tivoli Vaudeville Pty Ltd in 1924, then by Mike Connors and Queenie Paul (in the Great Depression years), Musgrove Theatres, again in 1934 under Frank Neil and Wallace Parnell and, from 1944, David N. Martin, managing director of Tivoli Circuit of Australia.

From 1937 to 1943, Fred Parsons (after whom the Fred Parsons Award was named) worked as scriptwriter and stage director Tivoli Circuit, under Frank Neil.

The circuit acquired the former "Grand Opera House" at Sydney, which in 1932 was renamed the New Tivoli Theatre.

The Tivoli was the major outlet for variety theatre and vaudeville in Australia for over 70 years. The circuit grew to include Melbourne, New Tivoli Theatre, Adelaide (built in 1913, now Her Majesty's Theatre and the only original Tivoli theatre still standing), Brisbane and Perth in their tours by the turn of the century, promoting both local and international musical, variety and comedy acts. It featured a broad spectrum of vaudeville acts including dancers, acrobats, comedians and ventriloquists, and the Tivoli was famous for its scantily-clad chorus girls, who were colloquially known as "Tivoli tappers".

== Legacy ==
Graeme Murphy directed and choreographed a dance musical, Tivoli, in 2001, paying tribute to the Tivoli circuit and its role in twentieth-century Australian theatre, presented by Sydney Dance Company and The Australian Ballet.

== Performers ==
The Tivoli featured a "Who's Who" of showbiz and entertainment; notable performers include: (selected)

- Mike Connors and Queenie Paul (husband and wife showbiz couple, who were also one time owners and managers)
- George "Onkus" Wallace
- Ron Shand
- Johnny Lockwood
- Buster Fiddess
- Val Jellay

== See also ==
- Roy Rene
- Tivoli Party Time - 1957 Melbourne television series featuring Tivoli acts
- Music hall - the equivalent in the United Kingdom
- Vaudeville - the equivalent in the United States
