= Delec Locomotive Depot =

Former railway workshop in New South Wales, Australia

Delec Locomotive Depot was an Australian locomotive depot purpose built for the servicing of diesel and electric locomotives by the New South Wales Government Railways opening in 1958. Its name is a portmanteau of the locomotive types it serviced.

It was built on the eastern side of the main marshalling yards at Enfield as the principal Sydney depot to maintain new diesel and electric locomotives that began to enter service in New South Wales in the early 1950s. Delec station was built on the Flemington to Campsie Goods Line and served by workers trains.

With the arrival of the 82 and 90 locomotives in 1994 and their maintenance outsourced to Clyde Engineering coupled with National Rail making its own servicing arrangements and the demise of electric locomotives, Delec's work began to contract. It was included in the sale of FreightCorp to Pacific National in February 2002.

With Pacific National opening a smaller maintenance facility at Clyde and heavier maintenance transferred to Port Kembla, Delec closed in 2008 being demolished in 2009.
