= Garry Ord =

Australian radio and television presenter (1931–2019)

Garth Francis "Garry" Ord OAM (13 March 1931 – 14 December 2019) was an Australian radio and television presenter.

== Career ==
=== Radio and television ===
Ord is arguably best known for being the final of three hosts of the Australian Broadcasting Commission's long-running The Hospital Hour radio program, which began as The Hospital Half-Hour in 1939, originally hosted by notable vaudeville performer Mike Connors. Connors hosted the program until his death in 1949 when Russ Tyson took over.

When Tyson resigned from the ABC in 1966, Ord became the show's third and final host. Ord hosted the program from 1966 until the show was axed in 1975.

Before joining the ABC, Ord began his media career in the Gippsland region of Victoria where he worked at local radio station 3TR from 1955 until moving into television at GLV-10 in 1961.

Shortly after joining the ABC in Melbourne in 1963, Ord was chosen to take part in a year-long staff exchange program with the Japan Broadcasting Corporation. He returned to Melbourne in 1964, before being transferred to the ABC in Brisbane in 1965.

Ord's television work for the ABC included covering various elections and the visit to Australia by American president Lyndon B. Johnson.

=== The Savage Day comments ===
In 1972, Ord openly criticised a decision by ABC management to place a radio serial called The Savage Day in The Hospital Hour.

With The Savage Day based on a thriller by Jack Higgins dramatising The Troubles in Northern Ireland, Ord said he believed the violence and death contained in the serial to be inappropriate for The Hospital Hour as he believed his program to be warm, friendly and used as an escape from "cares and troubles" particularly for hospital patients that tuned in.

The following day, Ord offered an apology and said he was concerned some people may have thought his comments were critical of the ABC as a whole, when in fact he considered it to be a "warm and human" organisation.

=== Books ===
Like his predecessor, Ord also released several books featuring a compilation of material used in The Hospital Hour. These include:

- The ABC Hospital Hour Friendship Book (1971)
- The Second ABC Hospital Hour Friendship Book (1974)
- The Australian Friendship Book (1981)

== Honours ==
In 1989, Ord was recognised in the Queen's Birthday Honours list by being awarded with an OAM "for services as a radio and television broadcaster".
