= Tivoli Party Time =

- Genre: Variety
- Country of origin: Australia
- Original language: English

Production
- Running time: 30 minutes

Original release
- Network: HSV-7
- Release: July 1957 – October 1957

Tivoli Party Time was an Australian television variety series which aired on Melbourne station HSV-7 from July 1957 to October 1957. It represents an early example of Australian-produced television content.

Information is difficult to find for the half-hour series, except that it aired live and featured acts who performed at the now-defunct Tivoli Theatre in Melbourne. It was actually the rise of television variety series like Tivoli Party Time that is credited with the demise of the Tivoli circuit.

The 8 September 1957 episode featured Spanish dancers Christine and Moll, and Filipino singer Bobby Gonzales as guests.

Although the series was short-lived, variety series as a whole would become a major part of Australian television during the late-1950s and 1960s.

Although kinescope recording (an early method of recording live television) existed during the run of the series, it is not known if any of the episodes were recorded using the technology.
