= Sydney Freight Network =

Railway line in Sydney, New South Wales, Australia

- New South Wales Metropolitan Rail Area with Sydney Freight network highlighted in black.
Route map
Map of the Southern Sydney Freight Line (green) and the Metropolitan Goods Line (red and blue). The blue line is the Port Botany Freight Line, which is part of the Metropolitan Goods Line.

The Sydney Freight Network is a network of dedicated railway lines for freight in Sydney, linking the NSW rural and interstate rail network with Port Botany and Sydney's main freight yard at Enfield. Its primary components are the Southern Sydney Freight Line (SSFL) and the Metropolitan Goods railway line.

The Network has been managed by the Australian Rail Track Corporation (ARTC) since 2012. Prior to the completion of the SSFL, it was managed by RailCorp as the Metropolitan Freight Network.

== Route ==
=== Metropolitan Goods railway line ===
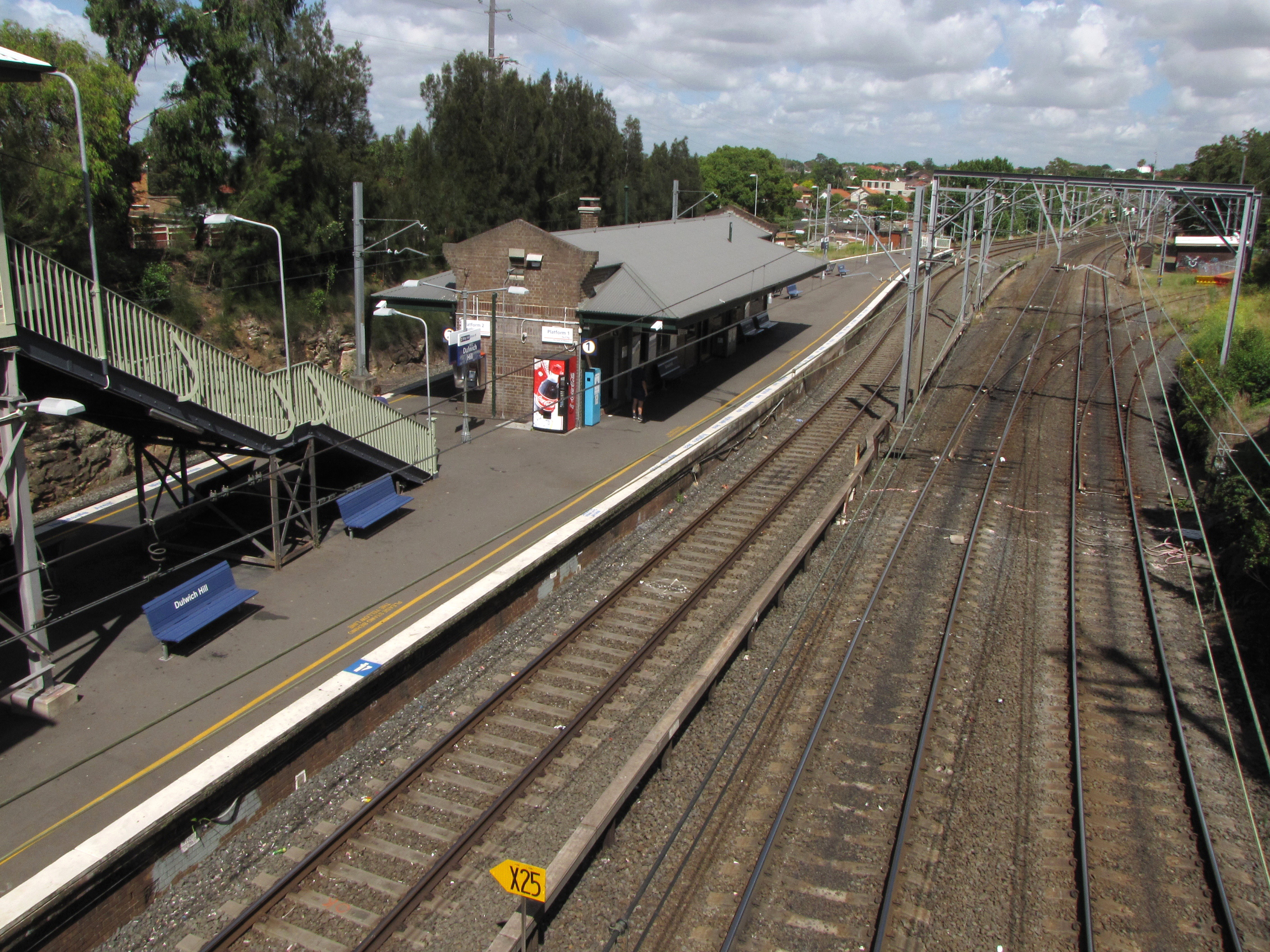
Dulwich Hill station in 2010, looking west with the Metropolitan Goods line to Enfield in the foreground, the former Rozelle branch diverging to the right

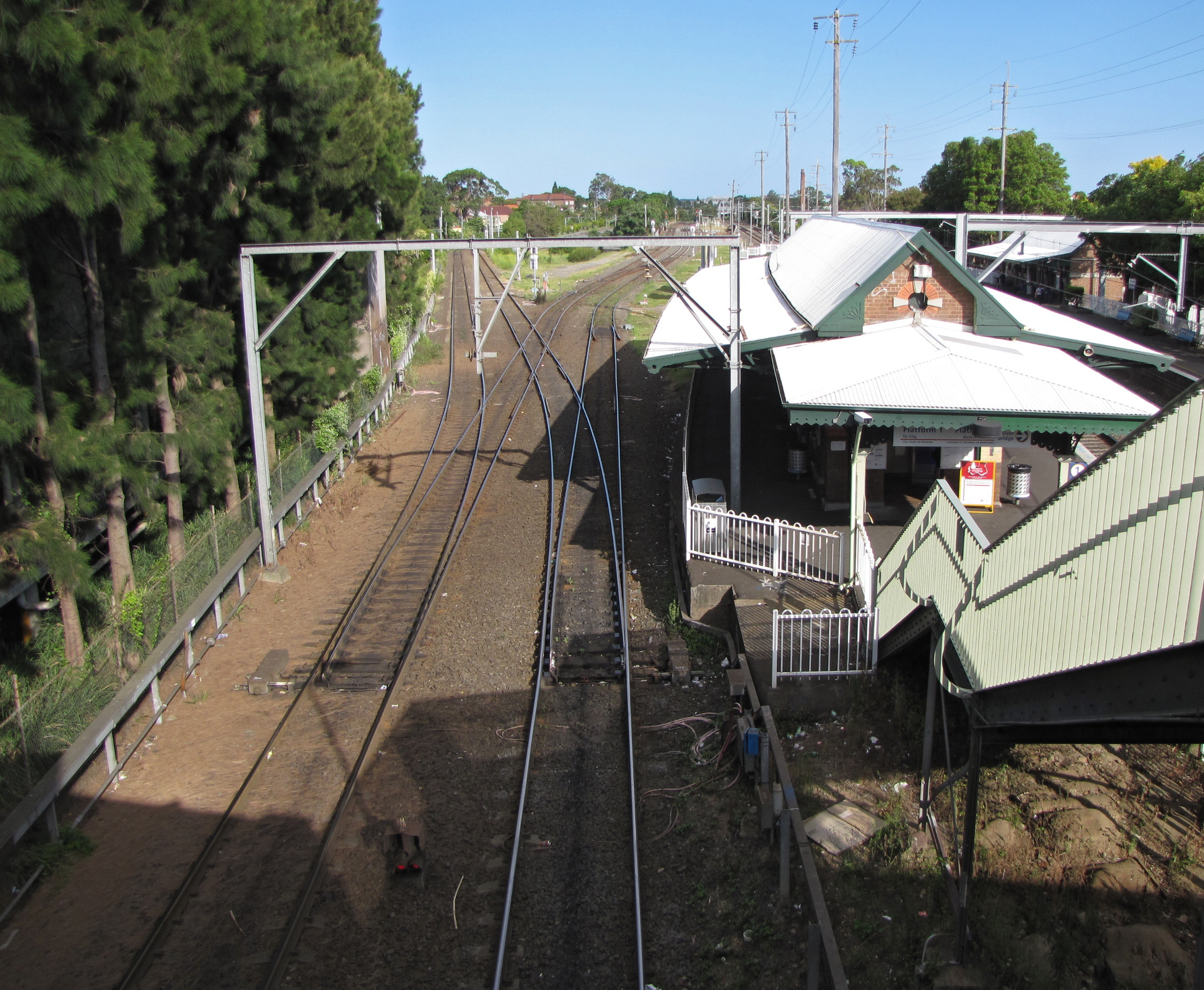
Marrickville station where the connection to the Illawarra line branches away to the left, passing beneath the line to Port Botany

The Metropolitan Goods railway line, also known as the Metro Goods Line, is a line from Sefton to Enfield and Port Botany. It contains the Botany Goods Line and previously contained the Rozelle–Darling Harbour railway line.

One arm of the network starts behind the Flemington Maintenance Depot while another starts at Sefton with both merging at Enfield. Services from the state's north and west approach via the former and from the south via the latter.

From Enfield, the line heads south to Campsie where it turns east and runs parallel to the Bankstown passenger line as far as Marrickville. From here, a connection to the Illawarra line provides a link to a sea terminal at Port Kembla, south of Sydney. From Marrickville, the line continues on its own alignment to the Cooks River and Port Botany container terminals. This section is named the Botany Goods Line or Botany Line.

There was previously a loop line that completed a circuitous route of the inner suburbs; this is the Rozelle Line. Diverging at Dulwich Hill, it headed north beneath the Main Suburban line at Lewisham to Lilyfield before heading east to Rozelle and Pyrmont, and then south under Railway Square through NSW's oldest tunnel to join the Main Suburban line outside Central. This line served the ports at Glebe Island (diverging via a spur from Lilyfield) and Darling Harbour.

The line had connections to allow suburban passenger services to operate on it including accessing the Canterbury Park Racecourse sidings on race days but these were out of use by the mid-1980s and have since been removed.

== History ==
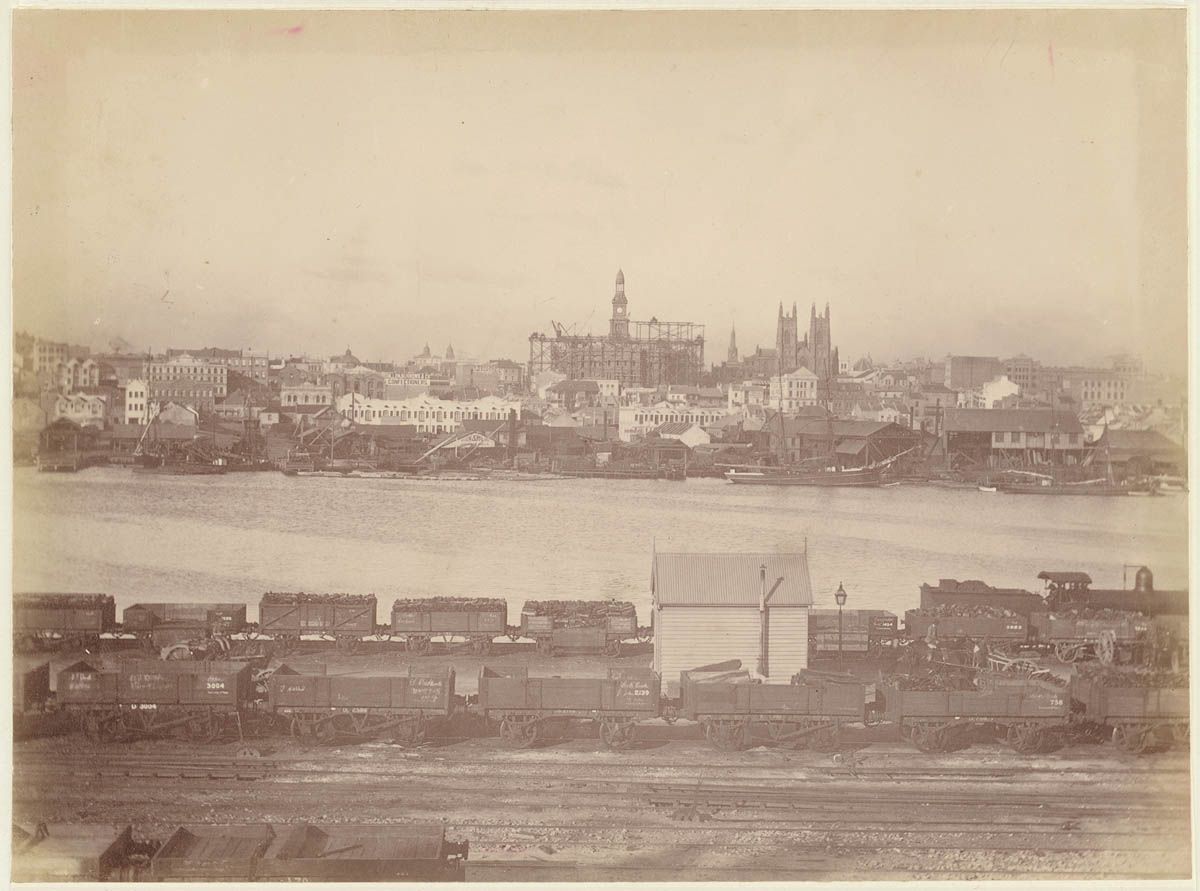
The Darling Harbour goods line sidings in the 1880s, looking towards the city

From the time when the Sydney Railway Company was formed in 1848, it had been the intention of the company to build a freight terminal at Darling Harbour. To this end, a railway line was constructed between the Sydney Railway Station (the predecessor to Central railway station) and Darling Harbour, which opened on 26 September 1855. Initially, freight consisted of spoil for the construction of the Main Suburban Line between Sydney and Parramatta, then for the carriage of departmental coke for steam engines, and a small amount of timber from 1860. Initial reports of the traffic on the line suggested that freight revenue amounted to only £20 a year, and there was only 60 tonnes of coke carriage a week.

Other problems beset the line in the 1860s. Darling Harbour had begun to silt up by 1863, and the 3d. charge per person, each way on the nearby Pyrmont Bridge (at that time privately owned) was a turnoff to traders looking to use the railway for the transport of their goods. Other factors combined to offset these problems: a plan to convey goods by horse tram to Circular Quay turned out to be a failure; traffic in hay, straw and chaff was transferred to the Darling Harbour yards in 1878; and by 1881, the main goods terminal in Sydney had become overcrowded, leading to directions that traffic for Sydney was to be directed to Darling Harbour. The Pyrmont Bridge was later purchased by the New South Wales Government for £48,600. By 1891, all outwards goods traffic was also being dispatched from Darling Harbour.

By 1908, goods traffic on the line to Darling Harbour and the neighbouring suburban lines had become excessive, with 592 wagons arriving each day and 512 being dispatched. It was decided to construct separate goods lines from Sefton to Darling Harbour via Enfield, Dulwich Hill and Rozelle, with extensions to Botany and the State Abattoirs at Homebush Bay. The initial scheme, approved by the Parliamentary Committee on Public Works, approved the initial line from Dulwich Hill to Darling Harbour. To avoid an opening rail bridge alongside the existing Glebe Island Bridge, a circuitous route was built around Rozelle Bay through the suburb of Pyrmont. The proposal, which included two tunnels under Pyrmont and Glebe, was approved on 23 November 1914, and the line opened on 23 January 1922.

On 14 October 1925, the line opened from Marrickville to Port Botany.

An additional Goods Yard was established at Cooks River in 1947. This yard connects with the Port Botany line to the east of the Princes Highway overbridge. From May 1982 until July 1995, a weighbridge existed on the westbound track between Canterbury and Campsie stations.

=== Electrification ===
With the exception of the Marrickville to Port Botany and Lilyfield to Central sections, the network was electrified in stages. The Dulwich Hill to Rozelle section was electrified in October 1967 while the Marrickville to Tempe section was completed in 1985. But with electric haulage of freight trains ceasing in the late 1990s, this infrastructure is no longer used and has been removed in parts. As of December 2018, the only remaining sections of overhead wires are a short section from the tunnel under the Bankstown line to Tempe, along the Down line from Dulwich Hill to Campsie and both tracks from Campsie to where the line separates from the Bankstown line.

=== The demise of the working harbour ===
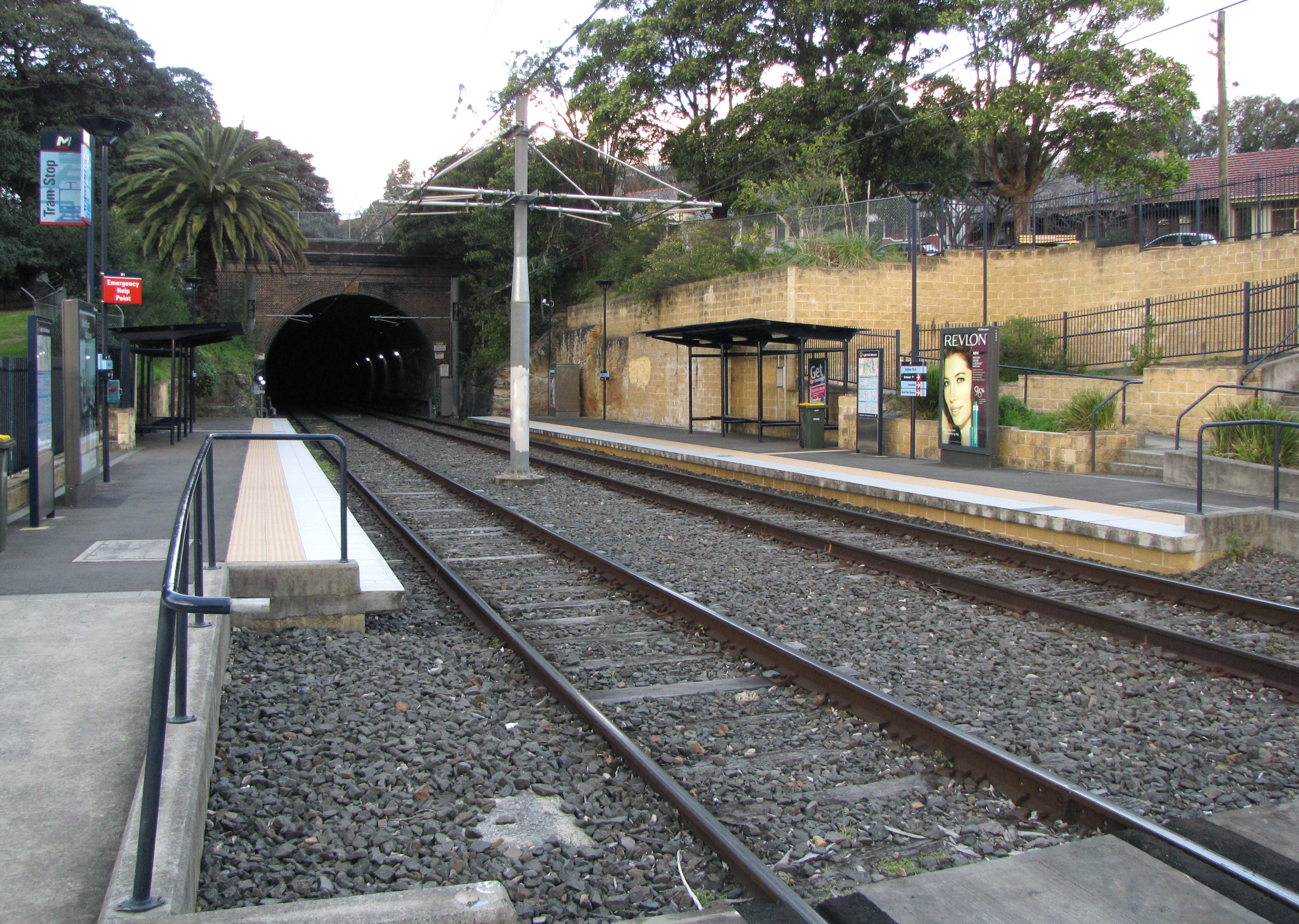
Jubilee Park light rail station, the portal for the tunnel under Glebe can be seen

The Darling Harbour branch experienced widespread use throughout the early 20th century. With the use of containers and the decentralisation of freight terminals in Sydney to places such as Chullora, Port Botany and Port Kembla, Darling Harbour traffic reduced considerably, with the yards closing in October 1984. In January 1996, the Lilyfield to Central section closed. Much of the trackbed was used for the light rail that opened to Wentworth Park in August 1997 and was extended to Lilyfield in August 2000.

A spur of the branch was retained from Central to connect the Powerhouse Museum to the network. A section of the spur fell into disrepair and was converted to a park and pedestrian pathway in August 2015.

In 1995, the freight only network was extended north with a dedicated bi-directional single freight line constructed from Flemington to Homebush where it joined a refurbished existing line to North Strathfield and Rhodes.

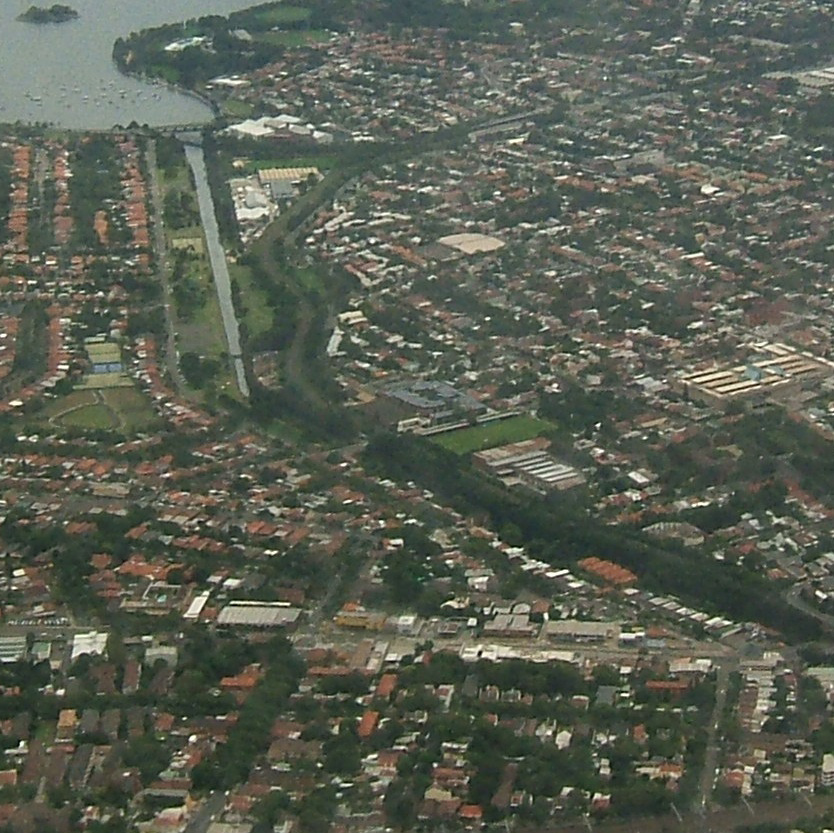
Aerial view of the Rozelle branch through Haberfield (to the left) and Leichhardt (to the right)

During the 1990s, the section between Dulwich Hill and Rozelle also saw a considerable decline in traffic after handling of bulk grain moved to Port Kembla, Enfield yard was remodelled and marshaling of trains consolidated there, and operations at the Glebe Island and White Bay ports wound down. Rozelle yard became overgrown but was used intermittently for the storage of disused railway wagons and passenger carriages. Eventually, the sole traffic was a service to deliver cereals to Mungo Scott's flour mill at Summer Hill. In 2009, the mill relocated to Maldon and all traffic on the line ceased.

In 2010, the NSW Government announced the Inner West Light Rail would be extended along the disused section from Lilyfield to Dulwich Hill. The extension opened on 27 March 2014.

=== ARTC era ===
In August 2004, the Australian Rail Track Corporation and RailCorp entered into an agreement for the ARTC to lease the Metropolitan Freight Network, specified as being the dedicated freight lines within the rail corridors:

- Sefton Park to Chullora
- Flemington South to Belmore
- Belmore to Marrickville (shared passenger and freight corridor – separate tracks)
- Marrickville to Port Botany and Dulwich Hill to Rozelle

In August 2012, RailCorp leased the Metropolitan Goods line from Port Botany to Enfield to the ARTC for 50 years.

In January 2013, the ARTC opened the Southern Sydney Freight Line; an extension to the dedicated freight network from the end of the Metropolitan Goods line at Sefton to Macarthur.

The loop between North Strathfield and Rhodes has been duplicated with an underpass as part of the Northern Sydney Freight Corridor works. The underpass opened in June 2015.

== Passenger stations ==
Until their cessation in 1996, railway workers' trains operated from Canterbury to Enfield South, Enfield Loco, Delec and Hope Street.

== Railway tours ==
Sydney Freight Network was used for a rail tour run by the Australian Railway Historical Society. During the tour, a CPH railmotor visited many parts of the network, including Campbelltown, Chullora Junction, and the Botany Line.

== In popular culture ==
The Rozelle branch was used in 1998 for filming of the television mini-series The Day of the Roses, and depicting Chicago in the film The Matrix.
