= Hope Street railway station =

Former railway station in Sydney, New South Wales, Australia

Hope Street

General information
- Operator: CityRail
- Line: Flemington–Campsie Goods Line
- Distance: 15.081 kilometres (9.371 mi) from Central
- Platforms: 1
- Tracks: 1

Other information
- Status: Closed

History
- Opened: 15 August 1927
- Closed: 1996

Hope Street railway station was a railway-employee only station located on the Flemington–Campsie Goods Line in Sydney.

== History ==
Hope Street opened on 15 August 1927. Railway workers including shunters, drivers, fitters, etc. from the various railway workshops between Delec and Enfield South used Hope Street station to get to and from work. Hope Street is named because of its locality to a side street off Cosgrove Road near the station. The station and Up Main were closed when the rebuilt Enfield Yard opened in 1996.

The former Enfield Loco Platform is located up whereas Delec Platform is down from the site.
