= Canterbury railway station, Sydney =

Railway station in Sydney, New South Wales, Australia

Canterbury
- Platform, November 2026

General information
- Location: Canterbury Road, Canterbury; Australia
- Coordinates: 33°54′43″S 151°07′06″E
- Elevation: 13 metres (43 ft)
- Owner: Transport Asset Manager of New South Wales
- Operator: Metro Trains Sydney (from 2026)
- Line: Metro North West & Bankstown Line
- Distance: 10.16 km (6.31 mi) from Central
- Platforms: 2 side
- Tracks: 4
- Connections: Bus

Construction
- Structure type: Ground
- Platform levels: 1
- Parking: Onstreet parking only
- Cycle facilities: Bike Locker available
- Accessible: Yes

Other information
- Status: Staffed
- Station code: CTB
- Website: Transport for NSW

History
- Opened: 1 February 1895
- Closed: 30 September 2024
- Rebuilt: 30 October 2026
- Electrified: 1926

Passengers
- 2023: 1,135,760 (year); 3,112 (daily) (Sydney Trains, NSW TrainLink)

Services
| Preceding station | Sydney Metro | Following station |
|---|---|---|
| Campsie towards Bankstown | M1 Metro North West & Bankstown Line | Hurlstone Park towards Tallawong |
Former services
| Preceding station | Sydney Trains | Following station |
|---|---|---|
| Campsie towards Lidcombe or Liverpool | Bankstown Line (until 2024) | Hurlstone Park towards City Circle |

New South Wales Heritage Register
- Official name: Canterbury Railway Station group
- Type: State heritage (complex / group)
- Designated: 2 April 1999
- Reference no.: 1109
- Type: Railway Platform / Station
- Category: Transport – Rail
- Builders: J. J. Scouller
Location
- Location within inner Sydney

Canterbury railway station is a heritage-listed railway station located on the Metro North West & Bankstown Line at Canterbury, New South Wales, Australia. The station was designed by New South Wales Government Railways and built from 1895 to 1915 by J. J. Scouller. It is also known as Canterbury Railway Station group. The property was added to the New South Wales State Heritage Register on 2 April 1999.

== History ==
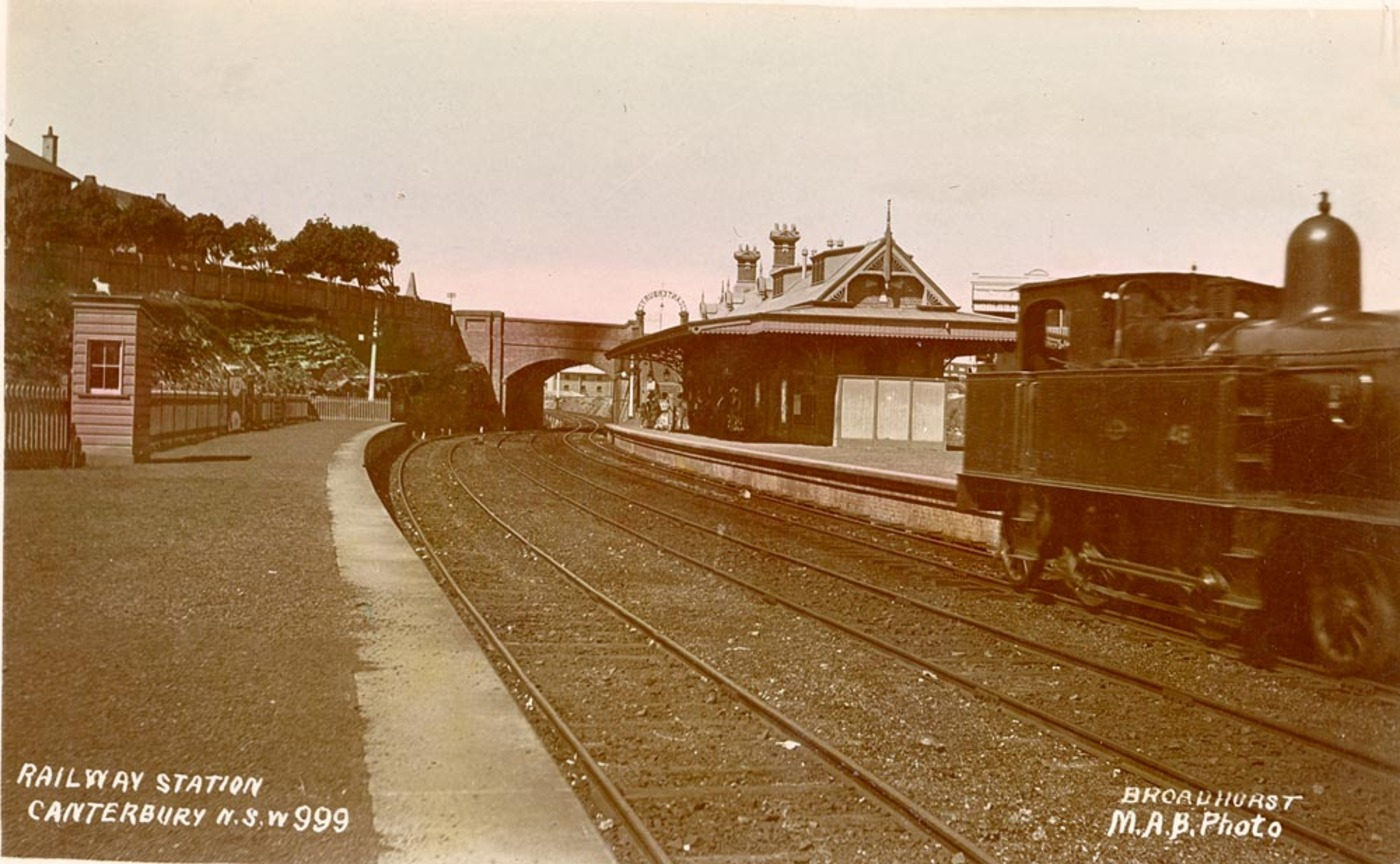
Canterbury railway station in the early 20th century

=== Bankstown line ===
Canterbury is located on the Bankstown railway line which was opened as far as Belmore on 1 February 1895 the same date on which the station was opened. The line had its origins in Railway Commissioner Goodchap's 1882 recommendation that an additional line was needed between Newtown and Liverpool to relieve traffic on the Southern Line and to encourage agriculture and suburban settlement. Lobbying by local interest groups and land speculators achieved Parliamentary approval by 1890 and construction commenced in 1892. The most important stations on the line, Belmore, Canterbury and Marrickville, were built with impressive near-identical brick buildings, the other intermediate stations (Campsie, Dulwich Hill and Hurlstone Park) receiving more modest timber buildings (later replaced), possibly reflecting economies of the depression of the 1890s. The depression suppressed the profitability of the line and the extension to Liverpool did not proceed. However, suburban development followed in the early twentieth century, particularly during the interwar period when many war service homes were built west of Canterbury. The line was extended to Bankstown in 1909 (and then to Regents Park in 1928, making it part of a loop line through Lidcombe), its justification by then being the servicing of suburban development.

Canterbury railway station was expanded in 1915 in conjunction with construction of the Metropolitan Goods line. To the north of the station, lie two tracks that are part of the Goods Line. The westbound line has a platform face that has been fenced off. A platform on the eastbound line was demolished in 1995. These were previously used for raceday specials when Canterbury Park Racecourse was operating. Several sidings were located just beyond the station for stabling raceday trains.

Canterbury signal box was commissioned on 13 December 1915 as part of the resignalling and track alterations of Canterbury station in preparation for the opening of the new Metropolitan Goods Line from Lidcombe via Enfield Marshalling Yards to Rozelle, in April 1916. The signal box was constructed with a mechanical interlocking lever frame using 68 of the 72 possible lever positions, which controlled the operation of signals and points in a set sequence.

The signal box controlled all train movements through Canterbury on both the Bankstown suburban line and Metropolitan Goods line. Through ancillary lever frames "B" and "C", the signal box controlled the storage sidings for the Canterbury Racecourse special trains and the shunting of the local goods sidings.

Two extensions have been added to the signal box. The western annex in 1937, and the eastern annex in 1968 to provide additional space to accommodate signalling relays, circuits and equipment. In 1994 a start was made on replacing the life expired signalling system and equipment on the Bankstown line and the Metropolitan Goods line. This resulted in the closure of Canterbury signal box on the weekend of 30–31 December 1996. After its closure it was sealed in its "as closed condition" by the Heritage Section of the State Rail Authority to preserve the building and its internal signalling equipment. All points (switches) at Canterbury have now been removed and signals are controlled from Sydenham Signalling Complex.

As part of the line's conversion to Sydney Metro in 2026, the station was upgraded and made accessible with the addition of lifts and tactile indicators in 2023. It closed on 30 September 2024 for the commence of works for the metro conversion and reopened on 30 October 2026.

== Platforms and services ==
| Platform | Line | Stopping pattern | Notes |
| 1 | M1 Metro North West & Bankstown Line | services to Tallawong | |
| 2 | M1 Metro North West & Bankstown Line | services to Bankstown | |

== Description ==
The complex comprises two Type 11 platform buildings: Platform 1, erected in 1895, and Platform 2, erected in 1915; an Overhead Booking Office and Concourse, erected in the late 1980s; and a Signal Box erected in 1915. Other structures include Platforms 1 and 2, both completed in 1895; canopies, erected in the late 1980s; an overbridge, erected c. 1917 and a footbridge, erected in 1915 and later modified.

=== Context ===
Canterbury railway station consists of one wayside (Platform 2) on the south and one island (Platform 1) on the north, with both original platform buildings remaining. The northern side of the island platform is not used for passenger services. The wayside platform is accessed from the footbridge via a ramp, while the island platform is accessed by stairs. Even though Platform 1 has a ramp, it is not wheelchair accessible due to the ramp gradient and the three steps at the top of the ramp. An overhead booking office accessed from the Canterbury Road overbridge on the east and from Broughton Street on the north was rebuilt in the late 1980s.

Platform Building – Platform 1 (1895)

External: Rectangular polychromatic face brick building with gabled roof and surrounding cantilevered awning clad in corrugated roof sheeting. The face brick is in stretcher bond, with dark brick walls and lighter salmon coloured bricks forming a dado, framing the upper half of the windows and doors and with a diamond pattern dentil course at the high level. The building is eight bays in length, with the bays defined by engaged brick piers which coincide with the awning brackets. Original chimneys with cement mouldings and terracotta flues remain but have been painted.

The cantilever awning is on filigreed steel brackets supported on decorative cement capped brick engaged piers and bolt fixings to the station building brick walls. The soffit lining is the underside of the corrugated steel roof fixed to intermediate exposed purlins. There is a decorative timber moulding at junction with brick wall. The canopy returns around the western end of the building but not the eastern or stair access end. The awning edges are finished with a decorative timber boarded valance.

The external walls rise from a projecting brick plinth (now painted) with a decorative two part cement dado moulding which frames the salmon brick dado and is continuous between door and window openings. Decorative cement window and door frames rise above the dado moulding, each with a decorative keystone.

The original window and door openings have segmental arches and the windows feature a decorative moulded cement sill. The original timber windows were double hung with a double paned lower sash and a multi-paned upper sash featuring coloured glass. Much of the original coloured window glass remains as well as the original fanlights above the door openings. The doors were timber panelled.

The end brick gables feature a louvre within a round brisk window frames in salmon coloured voussoir shaped bricks with four cement keystones.

Internal: The building comprises a booking hall entered by a set of double doors at the bottom of the stairs; a booking office; station masters room; general waiting room; ladies waiting room and ladies toilet, a lamp room and men's toilet. The internal usage has now changed, and the toilets have modern fitouts. All of these facilities are now closed to the public. Passengers are directed to use a public toilet just outside the station on Broughton St at the bus terminus.

Platform Building – Platform 2 (1915)

External: Rectangular face brick building with gabled corrugated steel roof and integral shallower sloped cantilevered awning. The face brick is in stretcher bond. The building is four bays in length, with the bays defined by engaged brick piers which coincide with the awning supports. The original chimney with cement mouldings and terracotta flue remains.

The cantilever awning is on standard double bowed steel brackets supported on decorative cement haunches and bolt fixings to the station building brick walls. The soffit lining is the underside of the corrugated steel roofing fixed to intermediate exposed purlins. There is a decorative timber moulding at junction with brick wall. Vertical timber boards form valances at each end of awning.

The external walls rise from a projecting brick plinth three/four courses high with a decorative dado moulding run in cement which is continuous between door and window openings. Decorative cement window and door frames rise above the dado moulding.

The original window openings feature a moulded cement sill with a scalloped fringe. The original timber windows were double hung with a single paned lower sash and a six paned upper sash featuring coloured glass, with glass louvres in the toilet windows. The original window glass as well as the upper glazing bars has been removed from all but one window. Original door openings featured fanlights matching the upper window sashes. All the original timber panelled doors have been removed.

Internal: The building comprises a general waiting room; ladies room and ladies toilets and men's toilets. The internal usage has now changed and the toilets have modern fitouts and finishes. The waiting room and ladies room have original ripple iron ceiling, ceiling rose and plaster wall finishes.

Overhead Booking Office (late 1980s)

The original timber clad overhead booking office has been demolished and replaced by a new steel framed metal hipped roof structure. This building is used as the station office, as well as housing a small shop.

Signal Box (1915)

External: Canterbury signal box is located beside the Bankstown suburban line, in the Canterbury Station precinct. It is a two-storey timber-framed structure clad in "checked and chamfered" weather boards. It has a hipped, galvanised corrugated iron roof with wide eaves on all sides. The first floor (or operating level) has wood framed, sliding windows on three sides with a blank rear wall. On the eastern end of the building there is a landing, incorporating an enclosed toilet. The landing extends past the front of the building over a public walkway to a flight of metal stairs. The ground floor incorporates the interlocking room and relay room. The interlocking room has four windows in the front wall. In the rear is the relay room, featuring four windows in the rear wall. The eastern extension is flat roofed and is constructed of precast concrete panels between exposed verticals simulating timber weatherboards. There is one door at the eastern end of this extension (2009).

Internal: The interior walls and ceiling of the first floor are lined with wall boards, and the timber floor is covered in linoleum. On the ground floor, the interlocking room is unlined, and the long and narrow lined relay room houses signalling relays which control the operation of signalling circuits.

Platforms (1895)

Platform 1 has an asphalt surface with its original brick face and a concrete edge. The northern or "goods" side of this platform is constructed in the same manner. Platform 2 also has its original brick face with a concrete edge.

Footbridge (1915)

Haunched beam design consists of tapered cantilevers bearing on platform trestles and brick piers on each side support shallow beams over the railway tracks. The footbridge has been modified at a later unknown date.

Overbridge (c. 1917)

The overbridge consists of steel girders supporting a jack arched brick and concrete deck. The girders span the Up and Down lines supported on concrete and brick abutment walls. The parapet walls are brick.

Canopies (late 1980)

New steel framed and metal roof clad canopies have been erected over the access stairs to the island platform and at the eastern end of the wayside station building, as well as the access ramp.

=== Condition ===
The platform buildings are generally in good condition. The overhead booking office is in good condition. The Signal Box exterior is in reasonably good condition with some peeling of paint. A fire caused some internal damage to the rear wall and ceiling of the operating level and there is evidence of past white ant activity. The platforms are generally in good condition. and in good condition are both the over bridge and the canopies. When the signal box was closed in 1996 the Heritage Section of former State Rail Authority had the building sealed in its final operating state. This action had the effect of maintaining the signal box in its as closed condition, preserving the mechanical interlocking lever frame and associated signalling equipment in a complete condition and it is therefore of high integrity. The footbridge retains its original haunched beam structure but has a new concrete floor, new balustrades and canopy cover. The access stairs to Platform 1 are modern. The overbridge retains all of its original steel beams and jack arches as well as the brick abutments, piers and parapet walls.

Platform Building – Platform 1

Externally, the station building retains most of the original detailing. Some windows have been modified by the insertion of fibreglass vandal-proof sheeting into the sashes, but a number of windows and fanlights retain the coloured glazing. Original roof vents have been removed, and the face brick chimneys painted. The male toilet modesty screen has been removed and three external doors have been replaced by flush doors. Internally, although the toilets have modern fixtures, a substantial amount of the original finishes remain. This includes plaster wall finishes, plaster ceilings and cornices, ceiling roses, the ticket window framing in the booking hall, benches and cupboards in the booking office.

Platform Building – Platform 2

Externally the station building retains most of the original detailing. Some windows have been modified by the insertion of fibreglass vandal-proof sheeting into the sashes, but a number of windows retain the coloured glazing, especially on the rear side. Original roof vents have been removed, and the face brick chimneys painted. The male toilet modesty screen has been removed and the external door has been replaced by a flush door. Internally, although the toilets have modern fixtures, a substantial amount of the original finishes remain. This includes plaster wall finishes, plaster ceilings, cornices, and ceiling roses. The female toilet retains the early partitions, but with new fixtures. The original mantelpiece remains in the waiting room but the fireplace is gone.

=== Modifications and dates ===
The station has been modified since its establishment in 1895 as follows:

- 1895 – Water tanks erected on eastern end of platform
- 1906 – Platforms lengthened
- 1915 – New building on Platform 3; signal box built
- 1916 – Goods line laid through station
- 1926 – Railway electrified
- 1927 – Track realigned, the Down Bankstown track alongside a new Down side platform; the Up Bankstown track alongside the old Up island platform; the Down Goods track replacing the middle storage siding and the Up Goods track replacing the racecourse siding; No 1 to No 7 car sidings at the racecourse opened and all were electrified
- 1937 – Western annex added to signal box and constructed of timber matching the main building
- 1968 – Eastern annex was added to signal box in precast concrete components
- Late 1980s – New overhead booking office
- 1996 – Signal Box closed
- n.d. – As the timber yard to the south has been in existence for at least three decades the goods yard and goods shed between Charles Street and the station is believed to have been demolished for sometime

== Transport links ==
Transit Systems operates five bus routes via Canterbury station, under contract to Transport for NSW:

- Departing from Broughton St Terminus:
  - 428: Canterbury to Martin Place
  - 428X: Canterbury to Martin Place (limited stop, peak hour only)
  - 487: Canterbury to Bankstown Central
- Departing from Canterbury Road stop:
  - 445: Campsie to Balmain
  - 491: Five Dock to Hurstville
- Canterbury station is served by one NightRide route:
  - N40: East Hills station to Town Hall station

== Heritage listing ==
As at 18 November 2010, Canterbury Railway Station possesses historical significance as it is a station on the Sydenham to Bankstown Line which was constructed to relieve congestion on the Main South Line as well as to encourage suburban development and the growth of agriculture in the late 19th and early 20th century. The main platform building represents the period of transition from the boom time of the 1880s to the standardisation of NSW railway building design from the 1890s onwards.

Canterbury Railway Station is significant at the state level as the Platform 1 Building demonstrates the high level of aesthetic design of the pre-1900 standard railway buildings, which included the use of polychromatic brickwork, decorative dentil coursing, ornate awning brackets and carved bargeboards. This platform building is relatively intact and is representative of a small group of such ornate platform buildings including Marrickville and Belmore on the Bankstown Line.

The Canterbury signal box is of historical significance as it is representative of the development of railway signalling technology in the first decades of the 20th century. As it was intact internally it is capable of providing information about the workings of a signal box of this era.

Canterbury railway station was listed on the New South Wales State Heritage Register on 2 April 1999 having satisfied the following criteria.

The place is important in demonstrating the course, or pattern, of cultural or natural history in New South Wales.

Canterbury Railway Station has historical significance as it is one of the railway stations on the Sydenham to Bankstown Line built to relieve the crowding on the Main Southern Line and encourage agriculture and suburban growth in the late 1800s and early 20th century. The brick building on Platform 1 represents that period which marked the transition from the boom period of the 1880s to the standardisation of NSW Railways building design of the 1890s and onwards. The signal box is of historical significance because it represents railway signalling technology in use at the time of its construction in 1915.

The place is important in demonstrating aesthetic characteristics and/or a high degree of creative or technical achievement in New South Wales.

The platform building on Platform 1 at Canterbury station has state aesthetic and technical significance because it exemplifies the particular design and style of brick island buildings erected by the NSW Railways prior to 1900 which possessed high qualities of aesthetic features such as polychromatic brickwork, dentilled brick cornices and cement mouldings which distinguish it from other platform building types.

Canterbury signal box is technically significant as a structure purpose designed and built to house a large mechanical interlocking lever frame and its associated signalling equipment and being in "as working" condition is well able to demonstrate the features of a signal box of this era.

The place has a strong or special association with a particular community or cultural group in New South Wales for social, cultural or spiritual reasons.

The place has the potential to contribute to the local community's sense of place and can provide a connection to the local community's history.

The place has potential to yield information that will contribute to an understanding of the cultural or natural history of New South Wales.

At the time of its closure the signal box was fully operational and has been retained in that state, which allows the opportunity to observe early 1900s railway signalling technology in its original working environment.

The place possesses uncommon, rare or endangered aspects of the cultural or natural history of New South Wales.

The signal box building design is rare within the metropolitan area, though other examples exist in regional locations.

The place is important in demonstrating the principal characteristics of a class of cultural or natural places/environments in New South Wales.

The building on Platform 1 is representative of the high architectural quality of a pre-1900 standard station building design. It's styling reflected the importance of the station at that time, the other important stations on the Bankstown line with the same design being Marrickville and Belmore. The building on Platform 2 is also representative of a standard design of railway building commonly utilised by the railways during the 1910/20s.

The signal box is representative of a large elevated mechanical interlocking railway signal box.

== See also ==
- List of Sydney Trains railway stations
- Public transport in Sydney
