= Enfield Loco railway station =

Former railway station in Sydney, New South Wales, Australia

Enfield Loco

General information
- Location: Australia
- Operator: CityRail
- Line: Flemington–Campsie Goods Line
- Distance: 14.526 kilometres (9.026 mi) from Central
- Platforms: 1
- Tracks: 1

Other information
- Status: Closed

History
- Opened: 1924
- Closed: 1996

Enfield Loco Platform was a railway station on the Flemington–Campsie Goods Line in Sydney, New South Wales, Australia. It opened in 1924 and was decommissioned in 1996, along with several other platforms on the line. The Enfield Intermodal Logistics Centre now exists on the site of Enfield Loco.

== Neighbouring stations ==
The former Enfield South Platform is located up whereas Hope Street Platform was down from the site.
