= Russ Tyson =

Australian radio announcer and TV presenter

William Russell Tyson (20 April 1920 - 11 September 2014) was an Australian radio announcer and television presenter.

== Career ==
=== Radio ===
Tyson was arguably best known for his radio work, particularly with ABC Radio Brisbane where he commenced as a cadet announcer in 1939. He subsequently became known for presenting a national breakfast program and the popular Hospital Half-Hour program.

Tyson was the second of three announcers who presented The Hospital Half-Hour, taking over from the show's original host, Mike Connors, after Connors died in 1949. Tyson had previously filled in for Connors during his ill health.

Following disagreements regarding the direction of the breakfast program, Tyson resigned from the ABC in 1966.

Tyson was replaced on The Hospital Half-Hour by Garry Ord, who hosted the program until it was axed in 1975.

After leaving the ABC, Tyson worked for commercial station 4KQ until his retirement in 1976.

=== Television ===
Tyson was the first person to appear on ABC Television in Queensland, when Brisbane station ABQ commenced transmission on 2 November 1959. Among the television programs he hosted were Anything Goes and On Camera.

== Books ==
Throughout his career, Tyson also released a number books. These include:

- What is a -? : a collection of listeners' contributions read by Russ Tyson in the Hospital Half-Hour of the ABC (1960)
- Philosopher's Note Book (1961)
- Philosopher's Scrap Book (1963)
- Russ Tyson's Australian Christmas Book (1965)
- Russ Tyson's Philosophy Corner(1968)
- Russ Tyson's New Philosophy (1970)
- The Best of Russ Tyson (1973)

== Later years and death ==
Tyson attended the ABC's 75th birthday celebrations in 2007. In 2012, he was a guest at the official opening of the ABC's new Brisbane studio complex at South Bank.

Tyson died at the age of 94 on 11 September 2014.
