= Enfield South railway station =

Former railway station in Sydney, Australia

Enfield South

General information
- Location: Australia
- Operator: CityRail
- Line: Flemington-Campsie Goods Line
- Distance: 14.462 kilometres (8.986 mi) from Central
- Platforms: 1
- Tracks: 1

Other information
- Status: Closed

History
- Opened: July 1957
- Closed: 1996

Enfield South Platform was a railway station on the Flemington-Campsie Goods Line in Sydney, New South Wales, Australia. It was used by workers at the railway's Enfield Tarpaulin Factory, and by signallers at the Enfield South signal box. It was decommissioned in 1996.

A 2009 report to NSW Ports determined the station site contained several artefacts constituting "state significance". The Enfield Intermodal Logistics Centre now exists on the site of Enfield South. Only remnants of the station remained.

== Neighbouring stations ==
Campsie station on the Bankstown railway line is located up, whereas the former Enfield Loco Platform is located down from Enfield South.
