= Delec Platform railway station =

Former railway station in Sydney, New South Wales, Australia

Delec
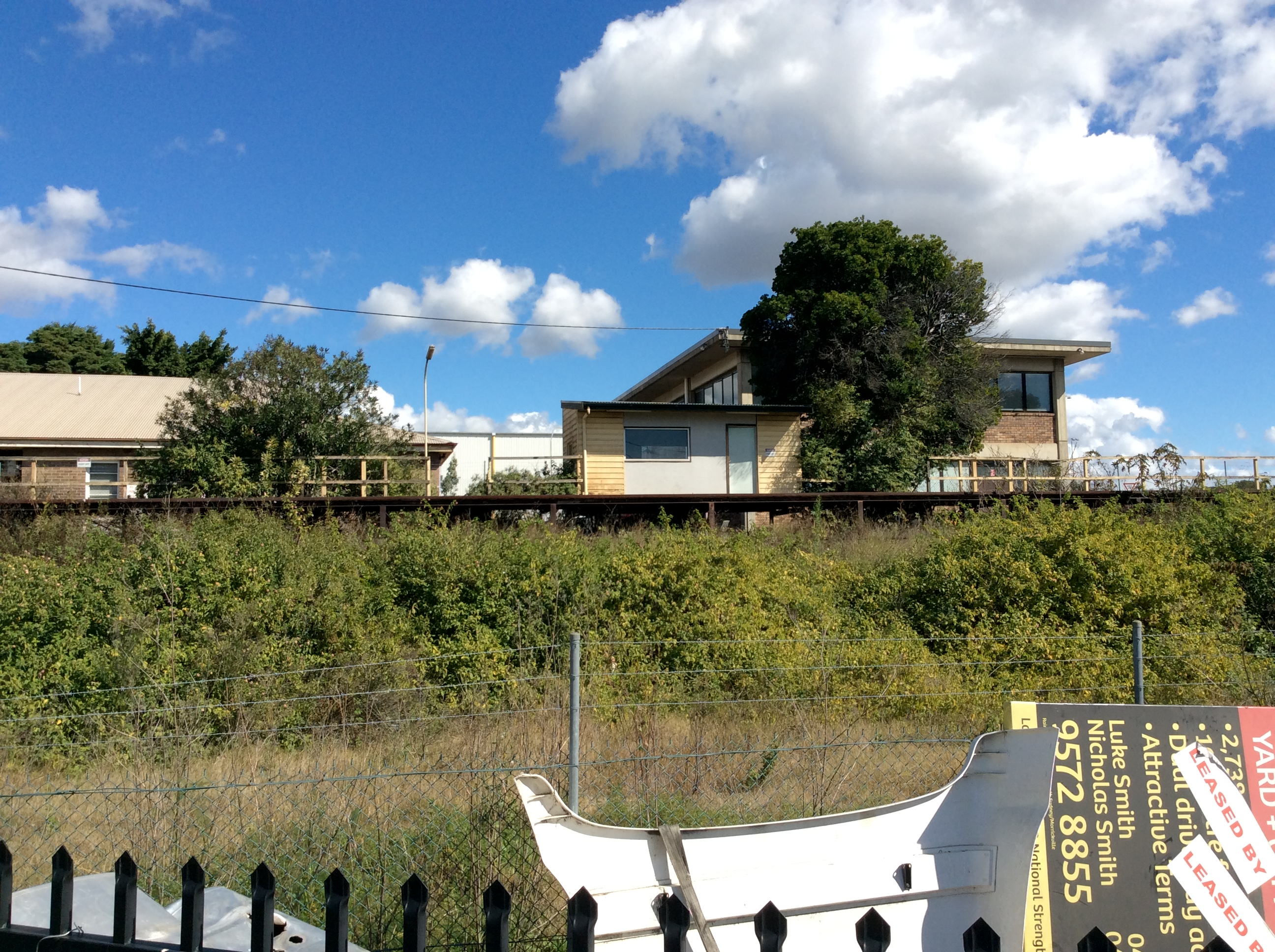

General information
- Location: Australia
- Operator: CityRail
- Line: Flemington-Campsie Goods Line
- Distance: 15.9 kilometres (9.9 mi) from Central
- Platforms: 1
- Tracks: 1

Other information
- Status: Closed

History
- Opened: July 1957
- Closed: 1996

Delec platform is an unused railway employee only platform located on the eastern side of Enfield Yard, on the Campsie-Flemington Goods Line in Sydney, Australia. Prior to Enfield Yard being remodelled in 1996, Delec was on the Up Main Line.

Both the New Up and Down main lines now run on the western side of Enfield Yard. The Station and Up Main closed in 1996 with the line now a shunting neck for Weston Flour Mill.

The platform served the adjacent Delec Locomotive Depot. This facility closed in August 2008.

== Neighbouring stations ==
The former Hope Street Platform was located up from Delec.
