= Mike Connors (vaudevillian) =

Australian radio presenter (1891–1949)

- Born: Michael Aloysius Connors; 1891; New York, United States
- Died: 16 January 1949 (aged 57); Sydney. Australia
- Occupations: Radio presenter, vaudevillian
- Spouse: Queenie Paul

Michael Aloysius Connors (1891 – 16 January 1949) was an American-born Australian vaudevillian and radio presenter.

== Biography ==
He was born in New York City and came to Australia in 1916 on a six-month stage contract as part of a vaudeville act, contracted by Benjamin Fuller.

After arriving in Australia, Connors met Queenie Paul whom he co-starred with in a revue.

Connors and Paul married in Newcastle on 17 November 1917, and the couple subsequently became known for their collaborative stage work.

After gaining financial backing in 1931, Connors and Paul established Con-Paul Theatres. In 1932, Con-Paul Theatres took over the lease of the Grand Opera House in Sydney and renamed it the New Tivoli Theatre.

The couple had three children together, Celestine, Colleen and Paul. Colleen Connors died at the age of five in December 1933 from meningitis.

In 1938, Connors began working in radio at the ABC, hosting a national breakfast program and The Hospital Half-Hour. Connors became seriously ill in 1948 from what was reported to be a blood clot. During his illness, he received many messages of support including one from Australian Prime Minister Ben Chifley. He returned to radio in December 1948, only to again fall ill several weeks later with his condition worsening.

Mike Connors died at the age of 57 on 16 January 1949. Fellow entertainers Roy Rene, Jack Davey, Harry Pringle, George Wallace, Jim Gussey and Reg Quartley served as pallbearers at Connors' funeral. Radio announcer Russ Tyson, who was already filling in for Connors during his ill health, replaced Connors on his radio programs.

Connors' widow, Queenie Paul commenced working nine months after the death of her husband.
