= Dulwich Hill =

- Suburb
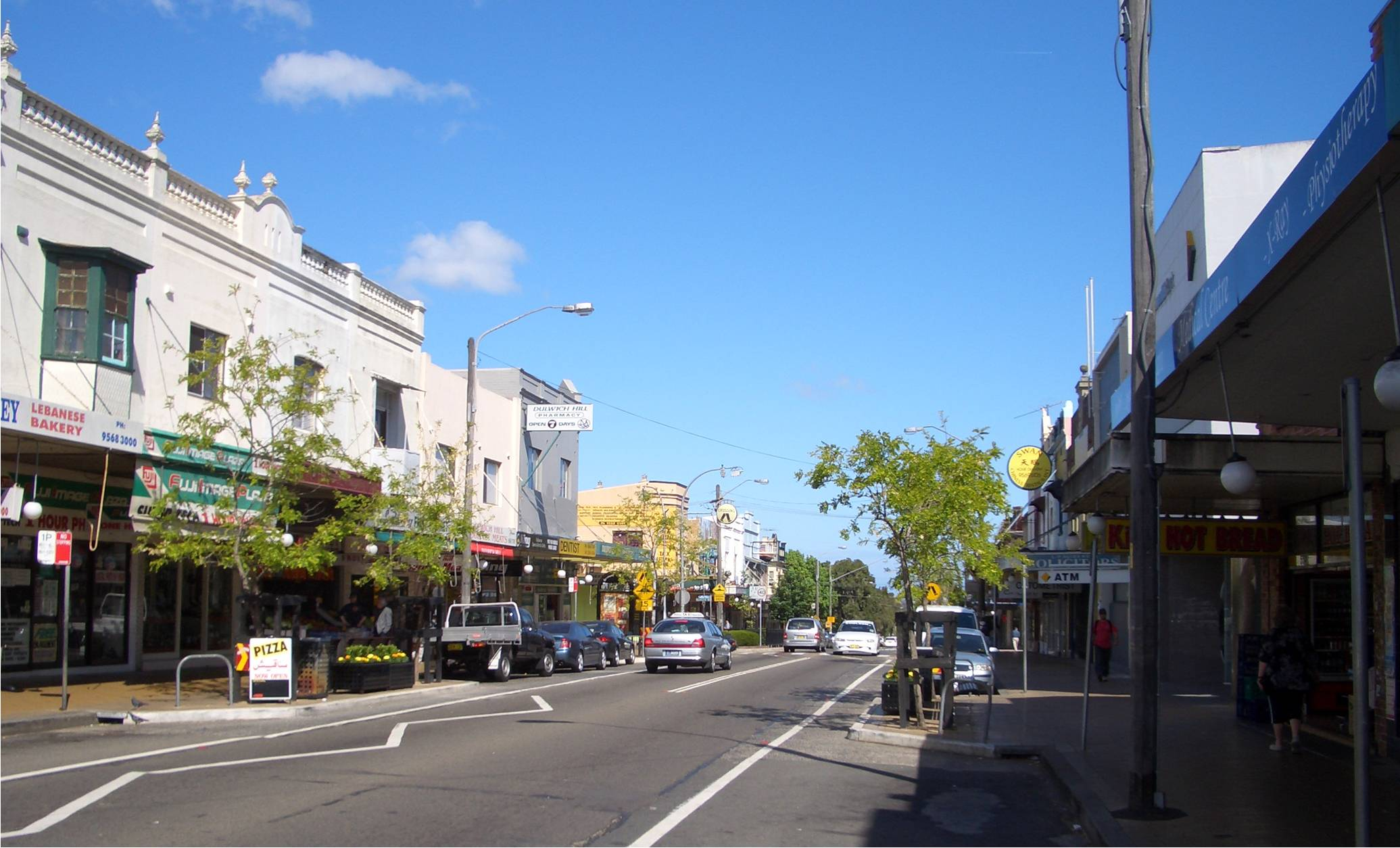

- Interactive map of Dulwich Hill
- Coordinates: 33°54′30″S 151°08′30″E
- Country: Australia
- State: New South Wales
- City: Sydney
- LGA: Inner West Council
- Location: 7.5 km (4.7 mi) inner-west of Sydney CBD
- Established: 1892

Government
  - State electorate: Summer Hill
  - Federal division: Grayndler

Area
  - Total: 2.12 km^{2} (0.82 sq mi)
- Elevation: 42 m (138 ft)

Population
  - Total: 14,046 (2021 census)
  - Density: 6,625/km^{2} (17,160/sq mi)
- Postcode: 2203
Suburbs around Dulwich Hill
Summer Hill	Lewisham	Petersham
Hurlstone Park	Dulwich Hill	Marrickville
Earlwood	Earlwood	Marrickville South

Dulwich Hill is a suburb in the Inner West of Sydney, in the state of New South Wales, Australia. It is 7.5 kilometres south-west of the Sydney central business district, in the local government area of Inner West Council. Dulwich Hill stretches south to the shore of the Cooks River.

== History ==
The suburb takes its name from the area of Dulwich in London. The name Dulwich Hill appears in Sands Directory of 1892. It had been known by several different names prior to this. Following European settlement, it was called Petersham Hill. It later took the name Wardell's Bush, a reference to Dr Robert Wardell, one of the area's early landowners. Other names the area was given were South Petersham and Fern Hill.

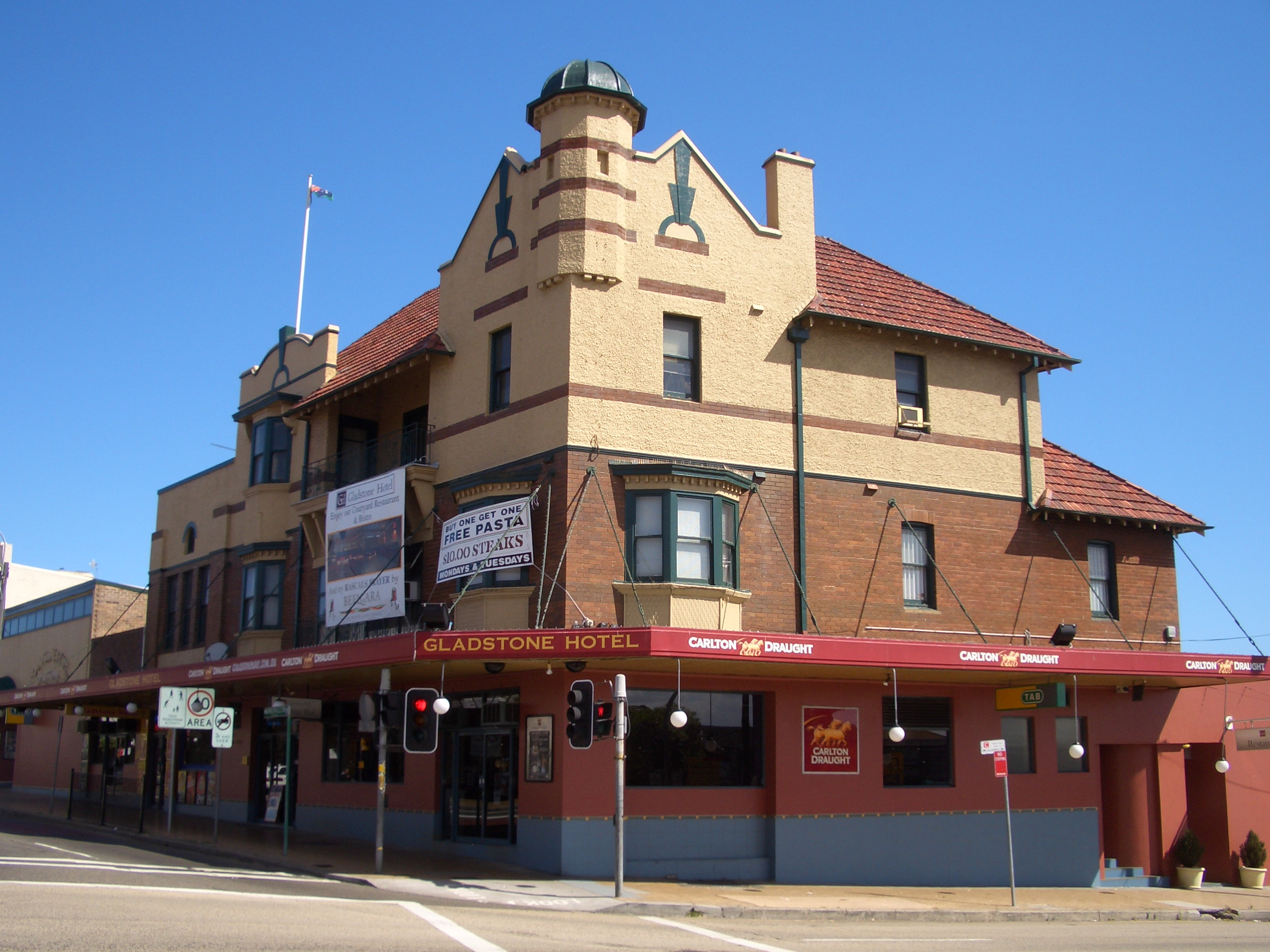
Gladstone Hotel, Dulwich Hill

The area became part of Sydney's expanding tram network in 1889 and, like many suburbs in the Inner West, experienced rapid growth in the early twentieth century. As a consequence, the suburb has a large number of examples of Australian Federation architecture. It also features examples of Edwardian, Gothic and Italianate architecture. The tramway ran up until 1957.

Listed on the Register of the National Estate is the former public school in Seaview Street, which now operates as the Dulwich Hill High School of Visual Arts and Design. The building was designed by W.E.Kemp in the Romanesque style and built circa 1892. Situated in the same street is the former location of the Dulwich Hill Library, a converted cottage in the Victorian Gothic style.

== Commercial area ==
Dulwich Hill features two shopping areas, a small number of shops on Wardell Road near Dulwich Hill railway station and the main shopping area around the northern end of Marrickville Road and its intersection with New Canterbury Road. The Marrickville Road shopping area centred on the former tram line (now replaced by buses), and continues onto New Canterbury Road. Cafés and restaurants have become popular as the suburb becomes gentrified. Marrickville Council upgraded the shopping strip in the early 2000s, enhancing the look and character of the area. Dulwich Hill has a library, the Emanuel Tsardoulias Community Library (a branch of Inner West Libraries) and a post office, but was never chartered a town hall or police station (the nearest is Marrickville Local Area Command).

== Education ==
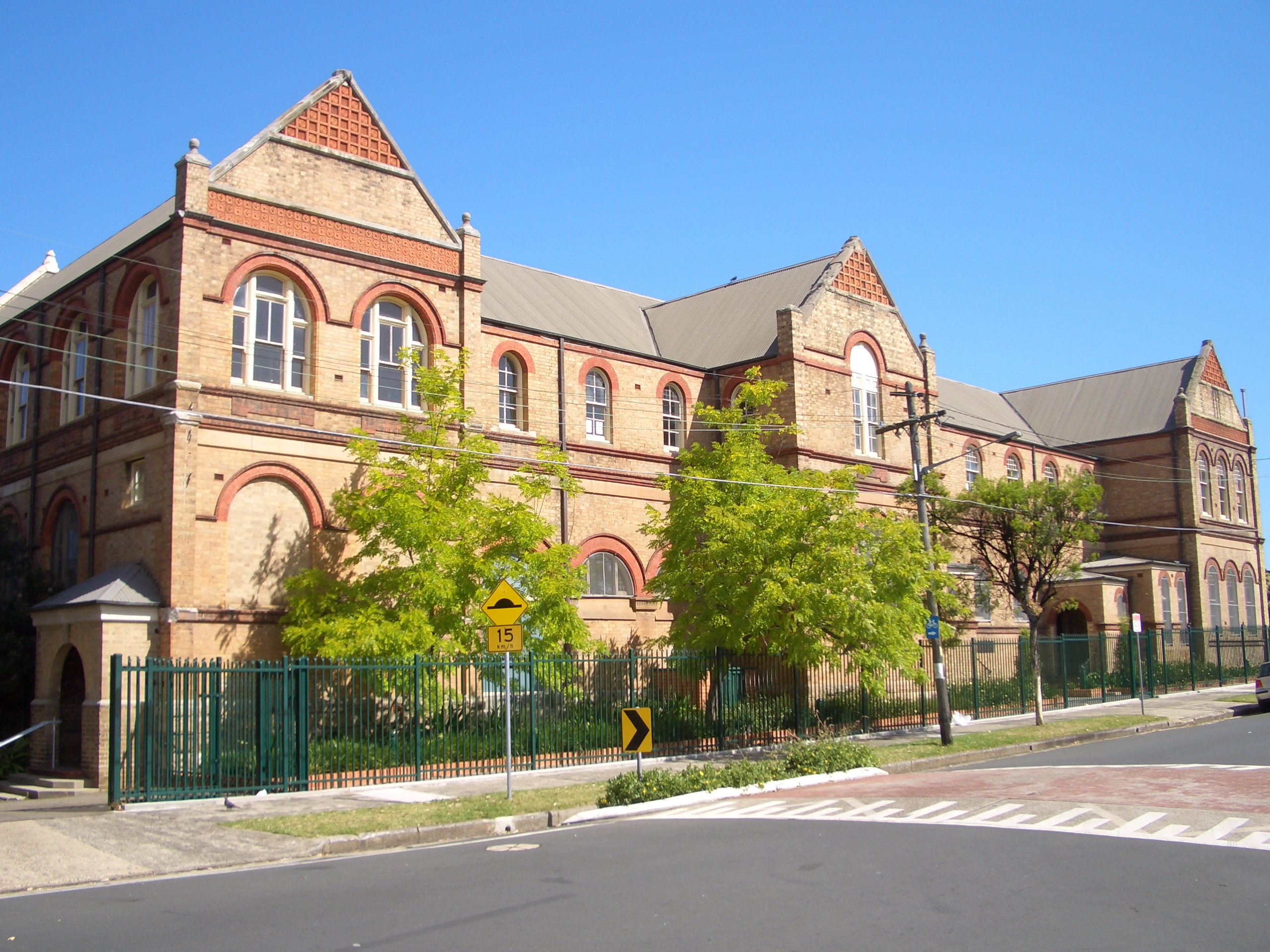
Dulwich High School of Visual Arts and Design

Dulwich Hill contains three primary schools: Dulwich Hill Public School in Kintore Street, St Maroun's College in Wardell Road and St Paul of the Cross, a Catholic school in New Canterbury Road, as well as one secondary school, Dulwich High School of Visual Arts & Design in Seaview Street. Dulwich High School was the first Visual Arts School in Australia.

Notable graduates of the high school include former Parramatta rugby league coach Terry Fearnley, tennis player Phil Dent and opera singer Yvonne Minton, while former rugby league referee Jack Danzey taught there.

== Transport ==
=== Tram history ===
Until the late 1950s, when the local tramway system was closed, electric trams ran to Dulwich Hill and the Cooks River from Circular Quay. The line to Dulwich Hill branched from the Cooks River line at Newtown, turning off King Street into Enmore Road, travelling through Marrickville and Dulwich Hill, via Victoria and Marrickville Roads. A tram tuning loop was provided at the Canterbury Road terminus.

=== Modern transport ===
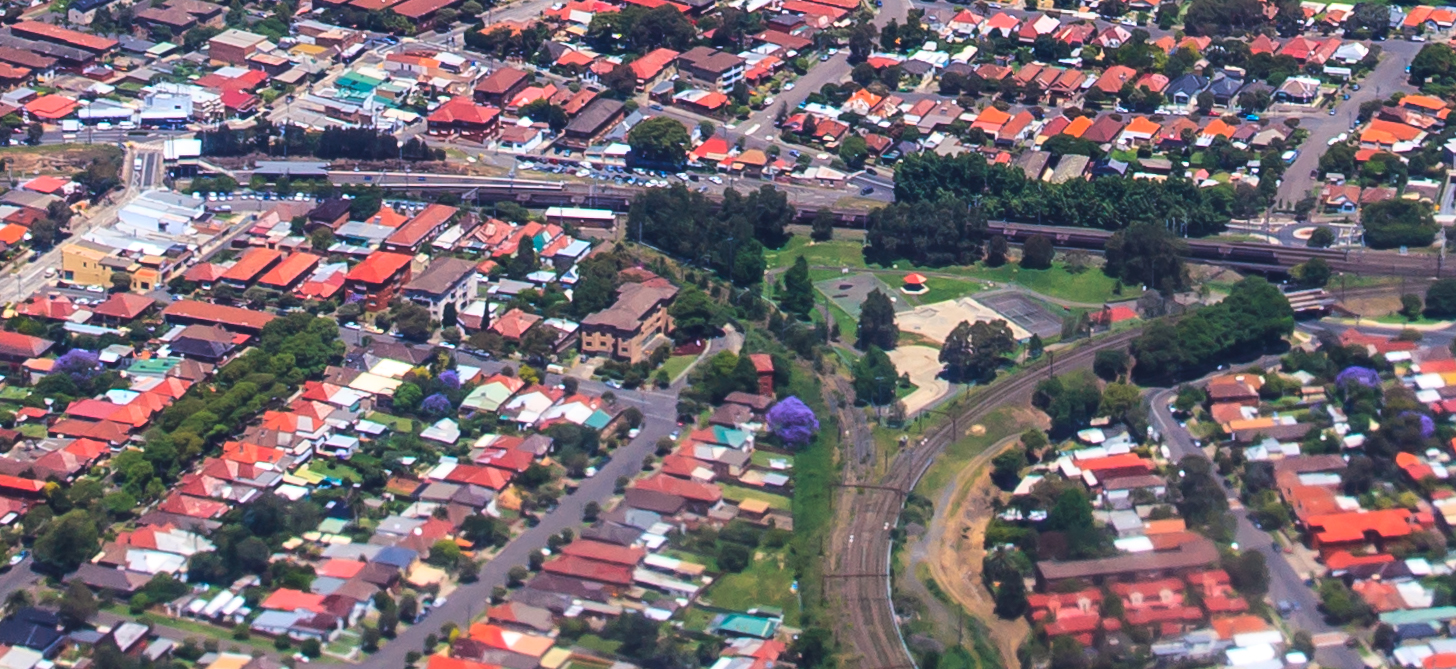
The Wardell Road Junction in 2009. This is now where the heavy rail and light rail lines meet. Dulwich Hill station can be seen top left. The overgrown tracks curving towards the station are now used by the light rail, which opened in 2014. The tracks curving in the other direction became disused when the freight services that had used this line ceased operating.

Modern public transport to the area comprises one railway station, four light rail stops and several bus routes.

Dulwich Hill railway station is located on Wardell Road, in the southern part of the suburb. Since 30 September 2024, it has been serviced by light rail and bus services only, pending conversion of the Bankstown railway line to Sydney Metro standards. Once these works are complete, Dulwich Hill will gain Metro North West & Bankstown Line services to the Sydney CBD, replacing the previous Sydney Trains service.

The Inner West Light Rail starts at Dulwich Hill railway station and includes three other stations in the suburb: Dulwich Grove (between New Canterbury Road and Hercules Street), Arlington (adjacent to Johnson Park near Constitution Road) and Waratah Mills (near Davis Street). Light rail services continue to the Sydney CBD, though via a more indirect route than the Bankstown railway line.

The 426, 428 and 412 routes provide bus connections between Dulwich Hill and the Sydney CBD. The 426 is the suburb's main bus route, starting at the corner of Marrickville and New Canterbury Roads and running along Marrickville Road towards Marrickville. The 428 service runs from Canterbury station along New Canterbury Road towards Petersham. Both routes merge at Enmore and proceed to the city via King Street, Newtown. The 412 runs from Campsie to the city. It comes up Wardell Road, passing Dulwich Hill railway station, before running along the south side of the railway and proceeding up Livingstone Road towards Marrickville and Petersham. In the CBD, all routes proceed up Elizabeth Street and terminate at Martin Place.

Other routes serving the suburb are the 445, 418 and 425. The 445 routes run from Campsie station to Balmain via Leichhardt, following the same route as the 428 through Dulwich Hill. The 418 between Bondi Junction and Burwood via Ashfield follows the same route as 426 between Marrickville and Dulwich Hill shops, before swinging on to New Canterbury Road, and then south to Hurlstone Park Station. The 425 follows the same route as the 426 to Marrickville, before heading to Tempe. It only operates during daytime hours on weekdays and Saturdays. All routes are operated by Transit Systems.

== Demographics ==
According to the 2021 census there were 14,046 people in Dulwich Hill. 63.0% of people were born in Australia. The most common other countries of birth were England 3.5%, Greece 2.7%, Vietnam 1.9%, New Zealand 1.8% and Lebanon 1.5%. 67.4% of people only spoke English at home. Other languages spoken at home included Greek 5.0%, Arabic 3.2%, Vietnamese 2.4%, Portuguese 1.9% and Spanish 1.8%. The most common responses for religion were No Religion 47.4%, Catholic 20.8%, Eastern Orthodox 6.9%, Not stated 5.8% and Anglican 4.7%.

Of occupied private dwellings in Dulwich Hill, 57.0% were flat or apartments, 28.8% were separate houses, 10.8% were semi-detached and 3.1% were other dwellings.

== Notable people ==
- Leisel Jones, Olympic swimmer
- Queenie Paul, vaudeville entertainer
- Joe Hildebrand-Journalist
- William Shakespeare, singer

== Governance ==
Dulwich Hill is primarily located in the federal electoral division of Grayndler, currently held by Anthony Albanese, of the Australian Labor Party (ALP), who was last re-elected in the 2007 General Election and has been named as the leader of the Labor party after its defeat in the election. The seat of Grayndler has been held continuously by the ALP since it was proclaimed in 1949. The section of Dulwich Hill south of the railway line is in the federal electoral division of Barton held by Linda Burney, of the Australian Labor Party (ALP), the first Aboriginal woman elected to the House of Reprentatives.

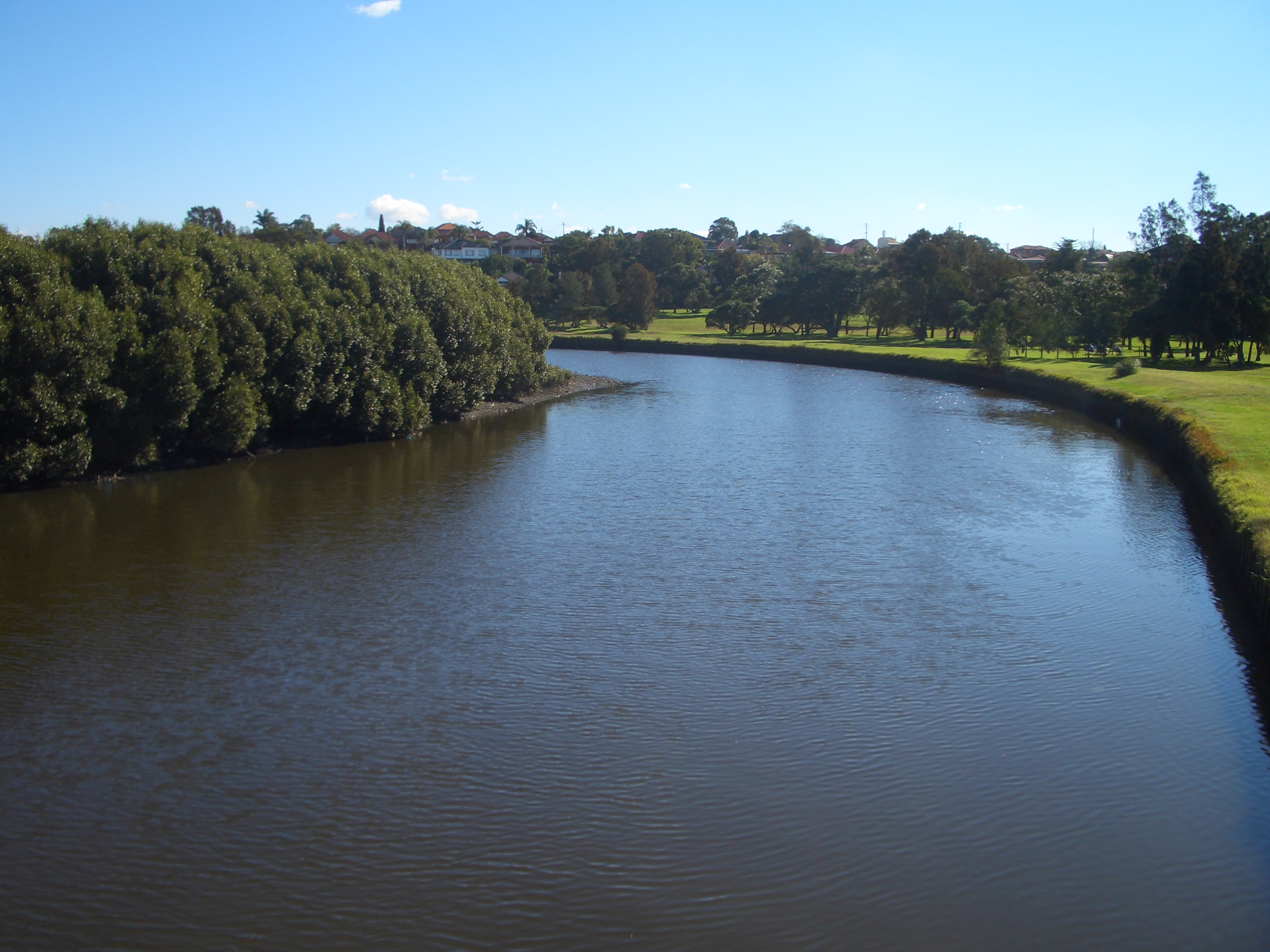
Cooks River

At the state level, Dulwich Hill is located in the electoral district of Summer Hill, which has been held by Labor's Jo Haylen since its creation at the 2015 election.

At the local level, Dulwich Hill is part of the Inner West Council, established in 2015. Prior to 2015, it was part of Marrickville Council, one of three councils that were amalgamated to form Inner West Council.

== Sport and recreation ==
Arlington Recreation Ground in Williams Parade is home to the Dulwich Hill FC soccer club, which plays in the NSW Super League, the second tier of senior soccer in Sydney, and also the Stanmore Hawks soccer club which plays in the NSW State League Division One, the third tier.

== Residential ==
A number of residential subdivisions in Dulwich Hill occurred in the early 20th century, and include well preserved Federation and Interwar era houses. These include, for example the Abelgeldie Estate in the northwest as well as the area around Hoskins Park, which are protected as heritage conservation areas. The former freight line, now light rail line, runs north–south through Dulwich Hill, and is the centre of an area formerly of industrial use, now mostly converted to medium density residential flats.

== Churches ==
The area is served by several religious organisations, including Anglican, Catholic, Greek Orthodox and Salvation Army churches.

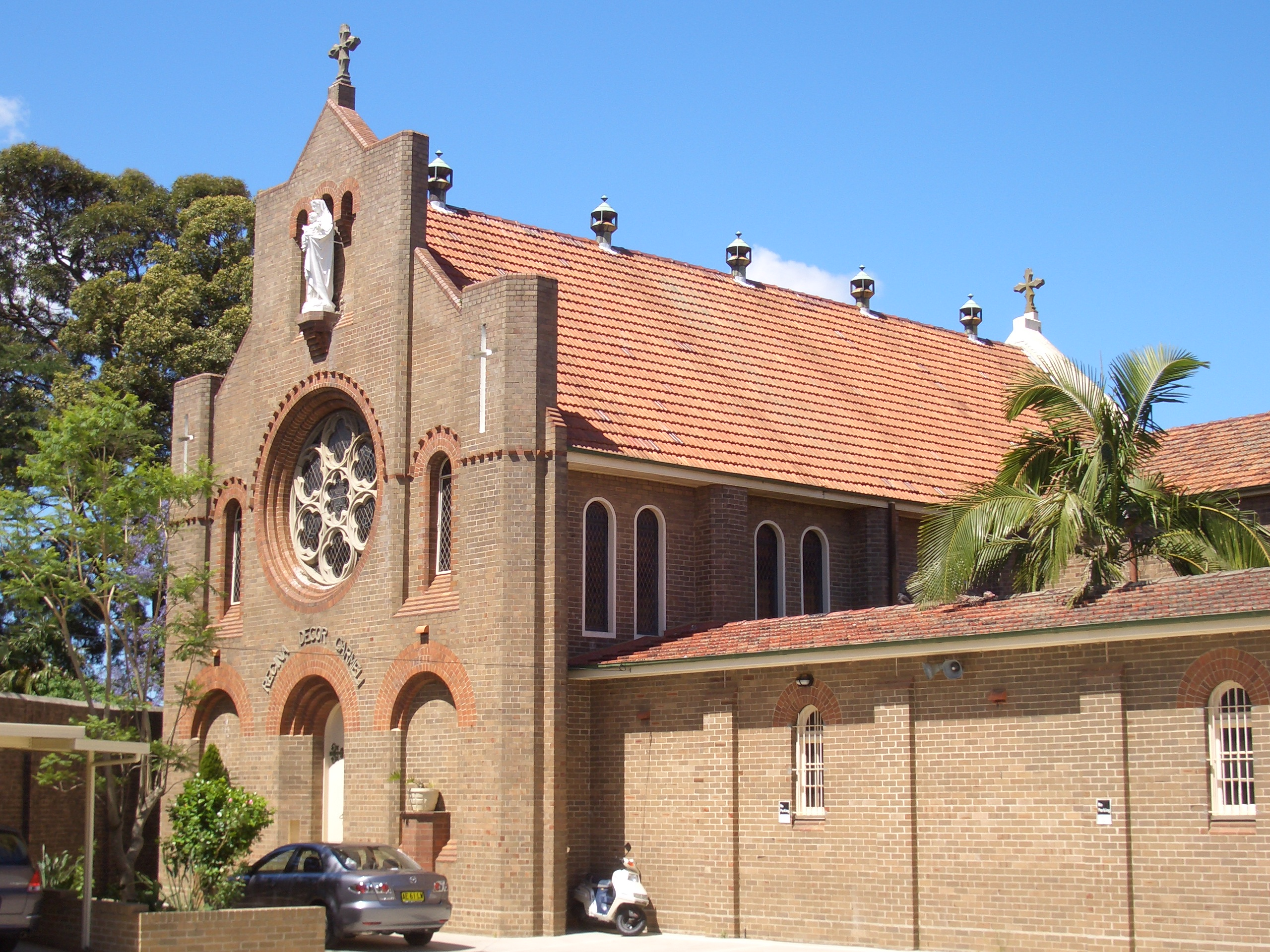
St Marouns Catholic Monastery

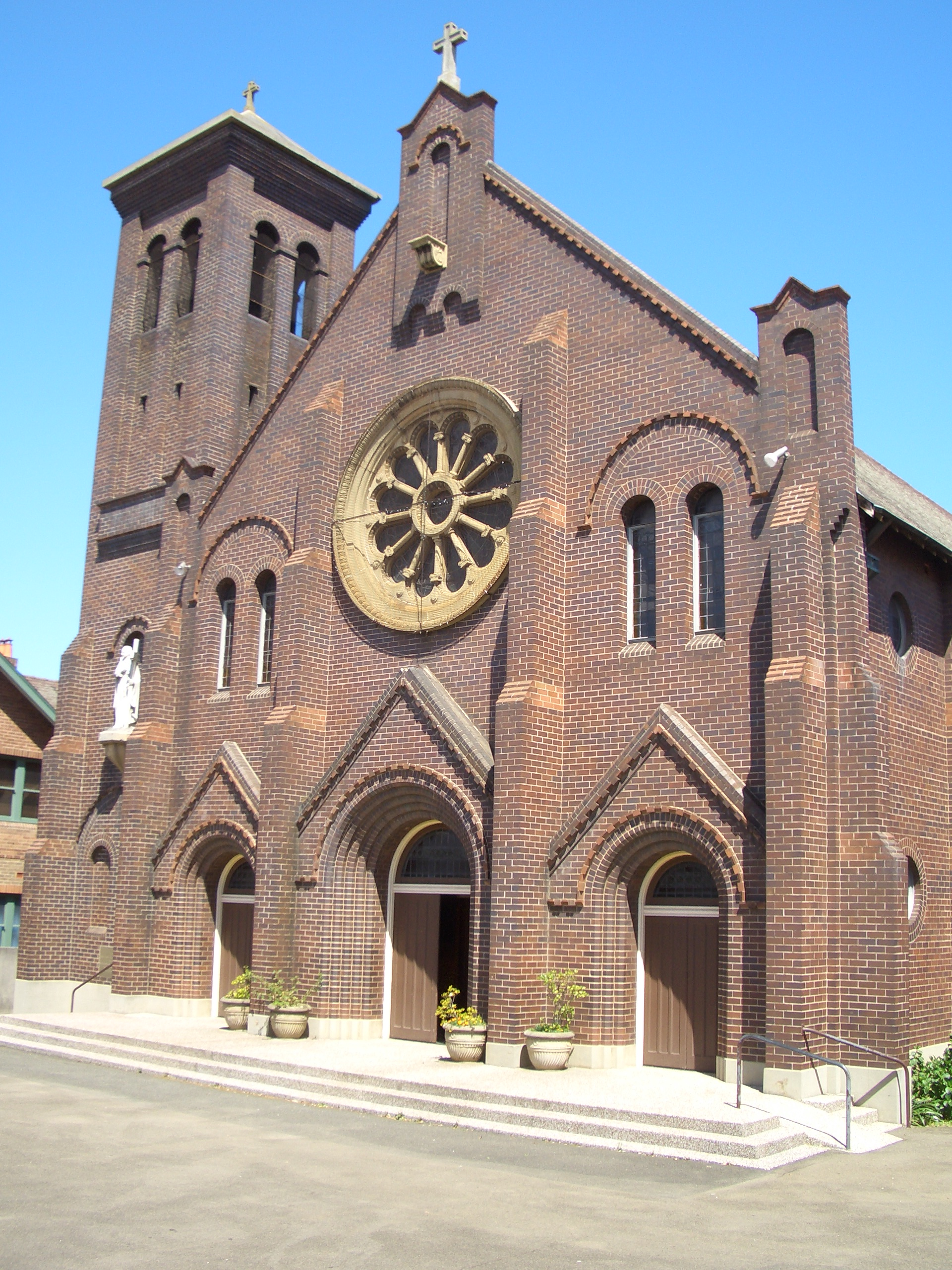
St Paul of the Cross Catholic Church
