= Queenie Paul =

Australian vaudeville entertainer

Queenie Paul OAM
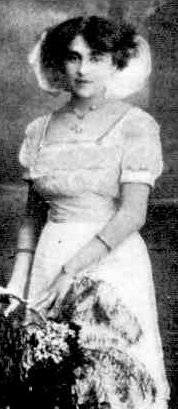
- Queenie Paul, 1911
- Born: Eveline Pauline Paul; 30 December 1893; Pyrmont, New South Wales, Australia
- Died: 31 July 1982 (aged 88); Dulwich Hill, New South Wales
- Occupations: Vaudevillian, theatre producer
- Years active: 1908-1982
- Known for: Establishing Con-Paul Theatres
- Spouse: Mike Connors
- Family: Anthony Field (great nephew)

Eveline Pauline "Queenie" Paul (30 December 1893 – 31 July 1982) was an Australian performer in vaudeville shows (singer and dancer) and a theatre producer, active in the industry for some 75 years from 1908 until the early 1980s. She was particularly known for her associations with the companies of J. C. Williamson and Sir Benjamin Fuller.

== Early life ==
Eveline Pauline Paul was born in Pyrmont, New South Wales , the daughter of Frederick William Paul and Antoinette Schuller Paul. Her father was born in Germany; her mother was French. Her nickname came from being the first girl in the family after four sons; she was "the little queen" from a young age.

== Career ==
Queenie Paul was on stage with J. C. Williamson as a chorus girl by age 15. In her early 20s she was the principal boy in a production of a pantomime, The Bunyip. In 1917 she co-starred with an American actor at the National Theatre; she and Mike Connors were soon wed, and worked in shows together for most of the next twelve years. Their "Con-Paul Theatre" company opened in 1931, with them headlining a variety show. In 1932, she was "ballet mistress and star" at the Sydney Theatre Royal.

In November 1933 Connors and Paul returned to the Tivoli Theatre in Melbourne to run its productions, and Paul introduced a new troupe of dancers, the "Sunkist Ballet". Billed as her "Sunkist Beauty Ballet", the dancers went with the company of 40 from the Melbourne Tivoli when it played a season in Launceston in 1934. The Connors took a touring company to New Zealand in the mid-1930s.

From 1938 Connors worked mainly in radio, while Paul kept producing stage shows. In October 1938 "Queenie Paul's Sunkist Ballet" featured in the vaudeville unit Mad About Dancing, staged between film screenings at the Regent Theatre in Sydney. In January 1940 a Connors and Paul pantomime at the Plaza Theatre included a "Miniature Sunkist Beauty Ballet". Paul's chorus lines were well known, and she trained the dancers herself as ballet mistress. In 1953 she took her "Sunkissed Girls" to Singapore to stage live entertainment for Shaw cinemas (Shaw Organisation). The following year she produced the revue Thanks for the Memory in Sydney for the entrepreneur Harry Wren, with George Wallace and Jim Gerald in the lead roles.

== Honours ==
Paul's stylish wardrobe was often remarked upon and reported about. Later in life, she continued performing in variety shows, and she was a regular guest on television talk shows. In 1977 she was the guest of honor on an episode of This Is Your Life. In 1982, she was awarded an Order of Australia medal (OAM).

== Personal life ==
Paul married her co-star Mike Connors in 1917. They had three children, Celestine, Colleen, and Paul; Colleen died in 1933. Paul was widowed when Connors died in 1949. She married again in 1960, to Walter John Harding, an accountant. Her great-nephews were Anthony Field of The Cockroaches and The Wiggles, and John Field and Paul Field, also of The Cockroaches. Queenie Paul died in July 1982, just two days after her last performance, at the age of 88 years, in her home in Dulwich Hill. Her papers are archived in the Performing Arts Collection at Arts Centre Melbourne.
