= Travellers Rest Inn =

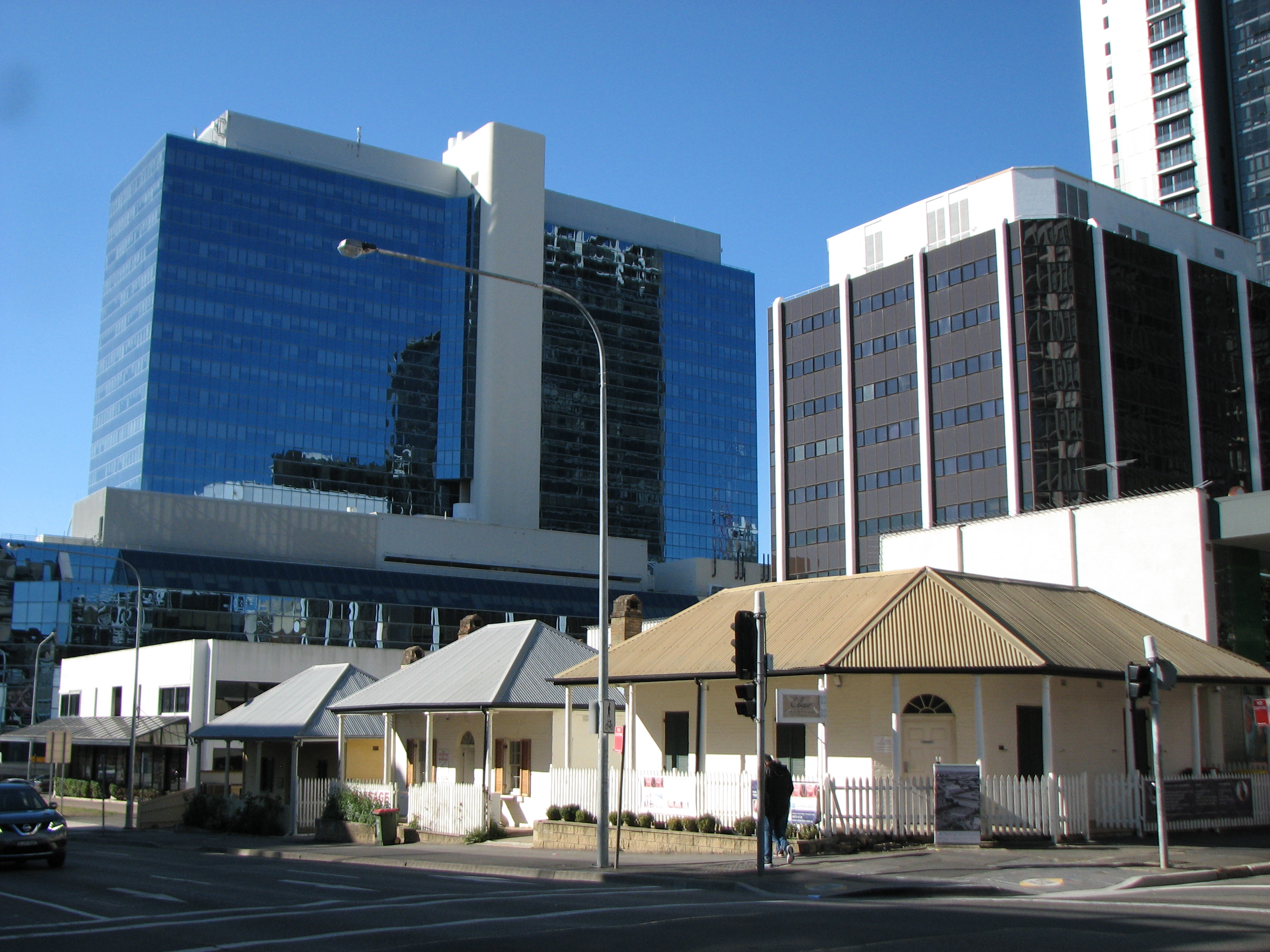
- Travellers Rest Inn Group consists of the three buildings in the right foreground. The buildings stand in stark contrast to the modern towers in the background.

- Location within Sydney Location within Australia
- 33°48′54″S 150°59′59″E
- Location: 12, 14, 16 O'Connell Street, Parramatta, City of Parramatta, New South Wales, Australia

New South Wales Heritage Register
- Official name: Travellers Rest Inn Group
- Type: State heritage (complex / group)
- Designated: 2 April 1999
- Reference no.: 748
- Type: Inn/Tavern
- Category: Commercial

Travellers Rest Inn is a heritage-listed former inn and residences and now offices at 12, 14 and 16 O'Connell Street, Parramatta, City of Parramatta, New South Wales, Australia. It was added to the New South Wales State Heritage Register on 2 April 1999.

== History ==
The Travellers Rest Inn Group consists of three properties, two cottages at Nos 12 and 14 and the Travellers Inn at No 16.

The 1823 map of Parramatta indicates that this land was occupied in 1823 by Patrick Kirk (Hunter/O'Connell Streets) and Samuel Larkin (O'Connell/Macquarie Streets). Only Kirk's portion showed a building.

An 1831 map of Parramatta shows more clearly a building on Kirk's corner and indistinct shading indicating a building with a well on Larkin's corner. The area between, that is, directly facing O'Connell Street had been portioned off and was occupied by W. H. Bennett.

The 1844 map of Parramatta shows buildings on Kirk's corner and along O'Connell street which seem to correspond with the location of the existing buildings. There was also a building on the corner of O'Connell and Macquarie Streets, set further back from the street frontage.

Land ownership is confused in Parramatta because of the absence of survey and clear legal occupation of most of the land until the 1840s. This was inpart clarified by the issue of 21 year leases in 1823. These leases could be converted to grants by the lessee or sold and converted by a subsequent lessee. In the case of the O'Connell Street land, Kirk obtained a lease for his corner portion, then transferred the lease to William H. Bennett, who converted it to a grant. Larkin did not obtain a lease to the corner of O'Connell and Macquarie Streets but a grant was subsequently issued to William H. Bennett. Bennett thus had title to the entire frontage of O'Connell Street between Hunter and Macquarie Streets, probably in fact by 1830 with legal titles for various allotments issued from the mid-1830s-1840s.

An investigation of the Rate Books indicates that by the 1860s, after Bennett's death, three of the cottages were owned by John Champley Rutter in 1865, 1869, 1872 and 1875. Dr Robert Champley Rutter was one of Parramatta's more colourful medical practitioners. He died in 1882 after more than 50 years as a surgeon in Parramatta.

The Sands Directories for the 1880s and 1890s shows a constantly changing list of probable tenants - dressmaker, contractor, stonemason, plasterer, photographer, baker, gardener and blacksmith.

In the 1898 Sands Directory it is noted that the corner of O'Connell and Hunter Streets was then used for the Travellers Rest, with D. Watsford as manager. Next to the Travellers Rest was The Wardley Home run by Miss Mary Brown.

The introduction of the aged pension to NSW in 1901 reduced the role of the Benevolent Society and the Travellers Rest was closed as a hostel. In 1902 the service was reduced to only operating in the Winter months. It is also thought that the cottage adjacent to the inn was used to accommodate widows and was later let to one of the charity workers. This service ceased in 1910. Two elderly women continued to occupy the inn, and it was generally assumed by neighbours that they owned the property. However, on the death of one lady in 1955 it was discovered that the property was still owned by the Benevolent Society.

In 1955 the property was bought by Kevin Orchard who used it until the mid-1980s as display storage and offices combined with a 1960s two storey commercial facing Hunter Street and sharing the site. The house was damaged by fire in 1986. In 1988 the house at No 14 O'Connell Street had been occupied by Mrs Reece since 1943 and was previously owned by her parents.

== Description ==
This is an Old Colonial Georgian group of single storey corner inn and two cottages of brick on a stone base. Hipped iron roofs cover original shingles to Nos 12 & 14, and there is a modern corrugated roof to No 16. Original brick chimneys are extant on No 14.

This building also has its original verandah and front two rooms under a hip roof to O'Connell Street and two rooms behind, under a skillion. The verandah is included under the hip and has a flat ceiling. Existing in the verandah space is a fibro accretion, of unknown date, assembled so as to enclose a portion of the verandah and the simple timber posts typical of the style in that portion.

== Heritage listing ==
House group which makes a notable contribution to townscape due to similarities in age, design, use and materials. This group of cottages is the most intact and earliest group of cottages in all of Parramatta. Their site also possesses potential to contribute to an understanding early urban development in Parramatta

The group is typical of the Georgian style, rare in Australia and existing only in the very early colonies of NSW and Tasmania. It is representative of the many inns that were its contemporaries in the region and physically representative of others now lost.

Travellers Rest Inn was listed on the New South Wales State Heritage Register on 2 April 1999 having satisfied the following criteria.

The place is important in demonstrating the course, or pattern, of cultural or natural history in New South Wales.

This item historically significant.

The place possesses uncommon, rare or endangered aspects of the cultural or natural history of New South Wales.

This item is rare.

The place is important in demonstrating the principal characteristics of a class of cultural or natural places/environments in New South Wales.

This item is representative.
