= Brislington, Parramatta =

Brislington
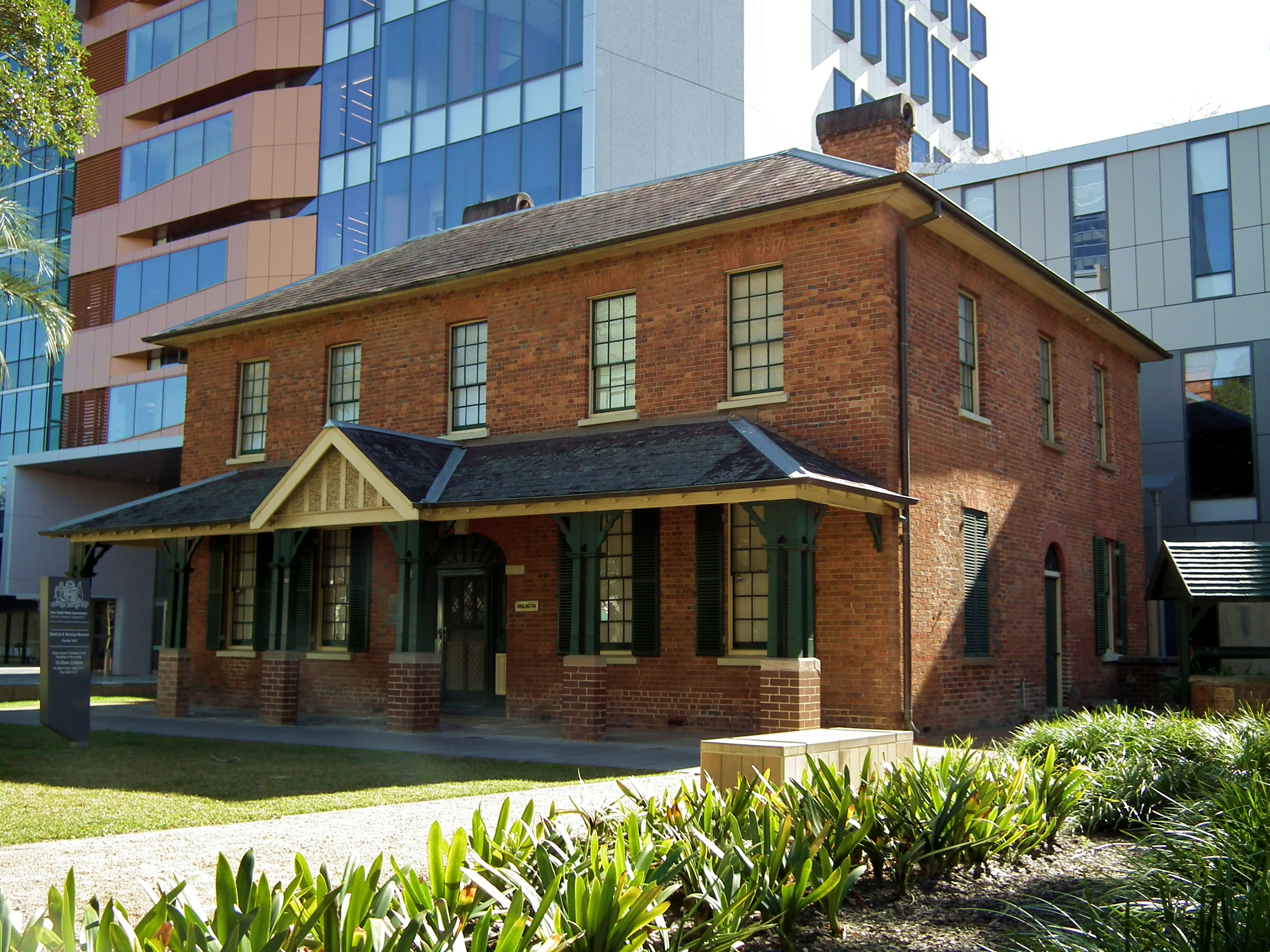

- Location within Sydney Location within Australia
- 33.8130°S 151.0021°E
- Location: 10 George Street, Parramatta, Sydney, New South Wales, Australia

History
- Built: 1819–1821

Site notes
- Owner: NSW Department of Health

New South Wales Heritage Register
- Official name: Parramatta District Hospital – Brislington and Landscape; Brislington & Landscape – Parramatta District Hospital
- Type: state heritage (complex / group)
- Designated: 2 April 1999
- Reference no.: 59
- Type: Hospital
- Category: Health Services
- Builders: John Hodge

Brislington is a heritage-listed former residence, inn, doctor's surgery, nurses' home and now museum at 10 George Street, Parramatta, Sydney, New South Wales, Australia. It was built from 1819 to 1821 by John Hodge. Incorporated into the former Parramatta District Hospital for many years, it now serves as the Brislington Medical and Nursing Museum. The property is owned by the New South Wales Department of Health. It was added to the New South Wales State Heritage Register on 2 April 1999.

== History ==
Brislington was built in 1819-21 for emancipist trader and publican, John Hodges, and probably used as the "Anchor & Hope" Inn. It was later occupied by Sir George Wigram Allen from 1840s to 1857. Local history claims that Hodges won a thousand pounds in a card game at the nearby Woolpack Inn - the 8 of diamonds being his winning card It is believed that to commemorate his luck, he had the convict bricklayers work the diamond pattern into the back wall of the building.

Then set on an acre and a quarter of ground, the building was "large and commodious", with four rooms on each floor, a variety of outhouses consisting of kitchen and pantry, a large cellar, two servants' bedrooms, a four stall stable and a coach house and possessing one of the first wells in Parramatta town. Hodges was found guilty of stealing a large stone from the Government Quarry to build his kitchen fireplace, his conviction leading to the forced sale advertisement in the Sydney Gazette on 14 April 1825.

In 1857 the title passed to Dr Walter Brown, the first of three generations of Doctors Brown, establishing a long association with the medical profession. Brown named the house Brislington after his home town in Bristol, England, commencing 95 years and three generations of the family's practise of medicine on this site (until 1952). Walter Brown died in 1896, his wife Sigismunda in 1903, both being buried in St. John's cemetery, Parramatta. The Port Jackson fig tree (Ficus rubiginosa) at the front gate was already large in 1857 when Brown bought the property.

From 1949, it became a part of Parramatta Hospital and was used as a nurses' home.

In the 1970s, it was proposed to demolish Brislington, as it was no longer needed for accommodation with the changing role of Parramatta Hospital and opening of Westmead Hospital meaning that Parramatta ceased to provide acute surgical care. The demolition proposal was not proceeded with. In 1983, both Parramatta and Westmead Hospitals established an Archives Committee to preserve their history, and began operating Brislington as a nursing/hospital museum, housing a medical and nursing display for public viewing.

== Description ==
Brislington is a large two storey Old Colonial Georgian free standing house in red brick, laid in Flemish bond, built between 1819 and 1821. The ground floor verandahs are a later addition. The roof, now slated, is hipped. The front garden, screened by a large Port Jackson fig tree, provides an appropriate setting.

The verandah and entrance porch has brick column bases with timber columns and bracketing with a slate roof.

A small (remnant) garden survives, with large pre 1857 Port Jackson fig (Ficus rubiginosa) on George Street, jelly palm (Butia capitata) near the south-western corner of the house, and more recent cottage plantings in beds edging lawn.

The cellar entry is on the rear of eastern (north–south axis) wing of house.

The garden contains two foundation stone tablets both relocated from the former "Cottage Hospital" designed by John Sulman, of Sulman & Power Architects, New South Wales Government Architect.

One stone tablet dates from 1 May 1901, commemorating The Hon. John See, NSW Premier's opening of a wing of the hospital.

The other stone tablet dates from 4 June 1896, commemorating Viscount Hampden, State Governor's opening the cottage hospital.

=== Modifications and dates ===
Built 1819-21 and set on an acre and a quarter of ground

c. 1910 ground floor verandahs added, with stumpy brick pier posts, twin timber posts, heavy timber brackets, and gabled entrance bay.

Two storey eastern bay is another addition. Some internal alterations made.

1930s?/40s? Front verandah added to (southern elevation) house, facing George Street.

1949 resumed by Parramatta District Hospital for health related uses (nursing home from 1949).

1970s?/redevelopment of the adjacent Parramatta District Hospital with a new Accident & Emergency wing directly north of Hambledon, three stories tall.

1982 restoration by Parramatta Hospitals, Parramatta City Council and NSW Heritage Council involved demolition of two rear wings (one two storey to the east, one one storey to the west) on the recommendation of National Trust.

== Heritage listing ==
Brislington is the oldest extant example of the archetypal early colonial two-storey townhouse privately built in mainland Australia. It has been associated with the medical profession since 1851 having been a doctors residence and practice and associations with the Parramatta District Hospital. This represents an extensive relationship with the community of Parramatta over an unparalleled period of time.

Association with notable people. Evidence of the major role of colonial and state government in Parramatta. Site possesses potential to contribute to an understanding early urban development in Parramatta.

Contains one of the first five wells dug (by colonists) in Australia, one of originally three on the property.

The Port Jackson fig tree (Ficus rubiginosa) which predates 1857, still growing in the remnant front garden is probably the oldest tree on the Parramatta Hospital site. Its geographic location relates directly to the formal symmetry of the house's façade.

Brislington was listed on the New South Wales State Heritage Register on 2 April 1999 having satisfied the following criteria.

The place is important in demonstrating the course, or pattern, of cultural or natural history in New South Wales.

Brislington is the oldest extant domestic structure within the town of Parramatta being built in 1821. It is a building of the Macquarie period.

The site's incorporation of a well, known as one of the first to be sunk in Parramatta and an extremely rare extant example of a house and well in an urban setting.

The place has a strong or special association with a person, or group of persons, of importance of cultural or natural history of New South Wales's history.

The association of the building with John Hodges, an early "character" of New South Wales, providing a link with the early colonial township of Parramatta.

The association of the building and site with the Brown family, from whom the name "Brislington" is derived and who occupied the home as a residence for over ninety years.

The association with of the building with nineteenth century identities such as George Wigram Allen and Alfred George Lloyd.

The site has been associated with the Parramatta District Hospital since c.1850.

The place is important in demonstrating aesthetic characteristics and/or a high degree of creative or technical achievement in New South Wales.

The building retains elements of its original fabric including sash windows, doors, fanlight, elements of the stair, cellar details and chimneys.

The building substantially retains its exterior fabric. The date of the building makes the bricks and flagstones extremely rare especially in a in-situ domestic urban setting.

The building incorporates an unusual decorative feature on its north-east exterior wall in the form of burnt bricks in a diamond design.

The original design of the building incorporates the unusual feature (in early colonial buildings) of two fronts.

The building possesses an Edwardian period front verandah, albeit reduced, and entrance door.

The place has potential to yield information that will contribute to an understanding of the cultural or natural history of New South Wales.

The site has been continuously occupied since the earliest days of European occupation in Australia. Thesite can potentially hold information pertaining to his period. The site has had the present dwelling on it since 1821. The iste therefore may have archaeological potential in revealing aspects about earlier configurations of the house and land and aspects of the garden.

The place possesses uncommon, rare or endangered aspects of the cultural or natural history of New South Wales.

This item is rare. It is the oldest existing building in Parramatta.
