= Murphy House, Parramatta =

Murphy House
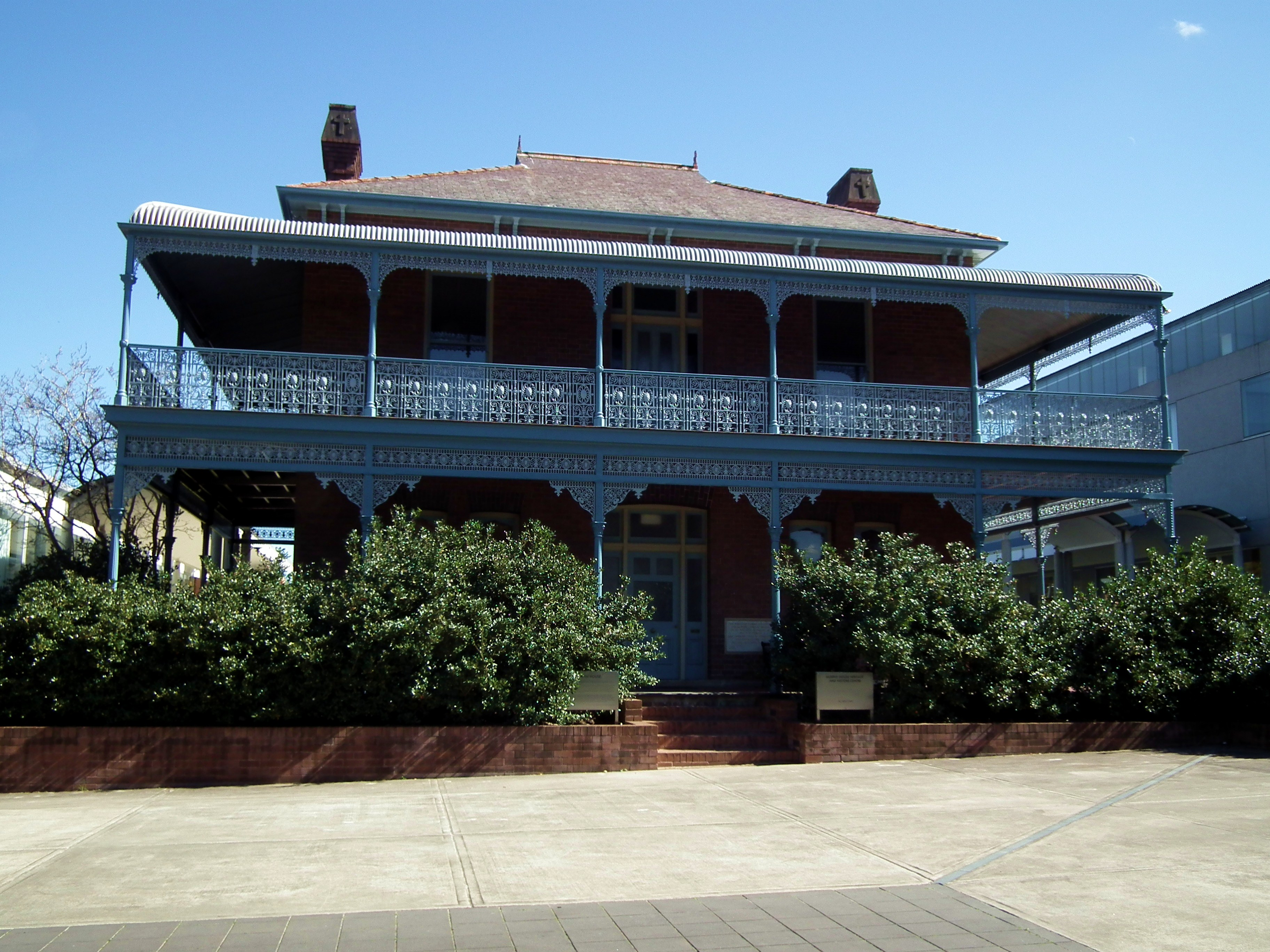

- Location within Sydney Location within Australia
- 33°48′33″S 151°00′12″E
- Location: 1 Marist Place, Parramatta, City of Parramatta, New South Wales, Australia

History
- Built: 1904–

Site notes
- Architect: James Whitmore Hill
- Owner: Trustees of the Roman Catholic Church

New South Wales Heritage Register
- Official name: Murphys House; St Patricks Cathedral Presbytery; Murphy House
- Type: state heritage (complex / group)
- Designated: 2 April 1999
- Reference no.: 238
- Type: Churchyard
- Category: Religion
- Builders: A.E. Gould

Murphy House is a heritage-listed former residence at 1 Marist Place, Parramatta, City of Parramatta, New South Wales, Australia. It was designed by James Whitmore Hill and built from 1904 by A. E. Gould. It is also known as St Patrick's Cathedral Presbytery and Murphy's House. It was added to the New South Wales State Heritage Register on 2 April 1999.

== History ==
It was built in 1904 as the presbytery for St Patrick's Cathedral, opening on 27 November that year. It was built at a cost of £1000. It replaced an earlier presbytery that was in poor condition and had been derided as "insanitary", and which had been blamed for the death of the parish priest from typhoid earlier that year. The new presbytery was dedicated to the late priest, Rev. Father P. B. Murphy. It subsequently became known as Murphy House.

It continues to be used for church purposes.

== Heritage listing ==
Murphy House was listed on the New South Wales State Heritage Register on 2 April 1999.

== See also ==
- Australian residential architectural styles
