= Parramatta =

- City
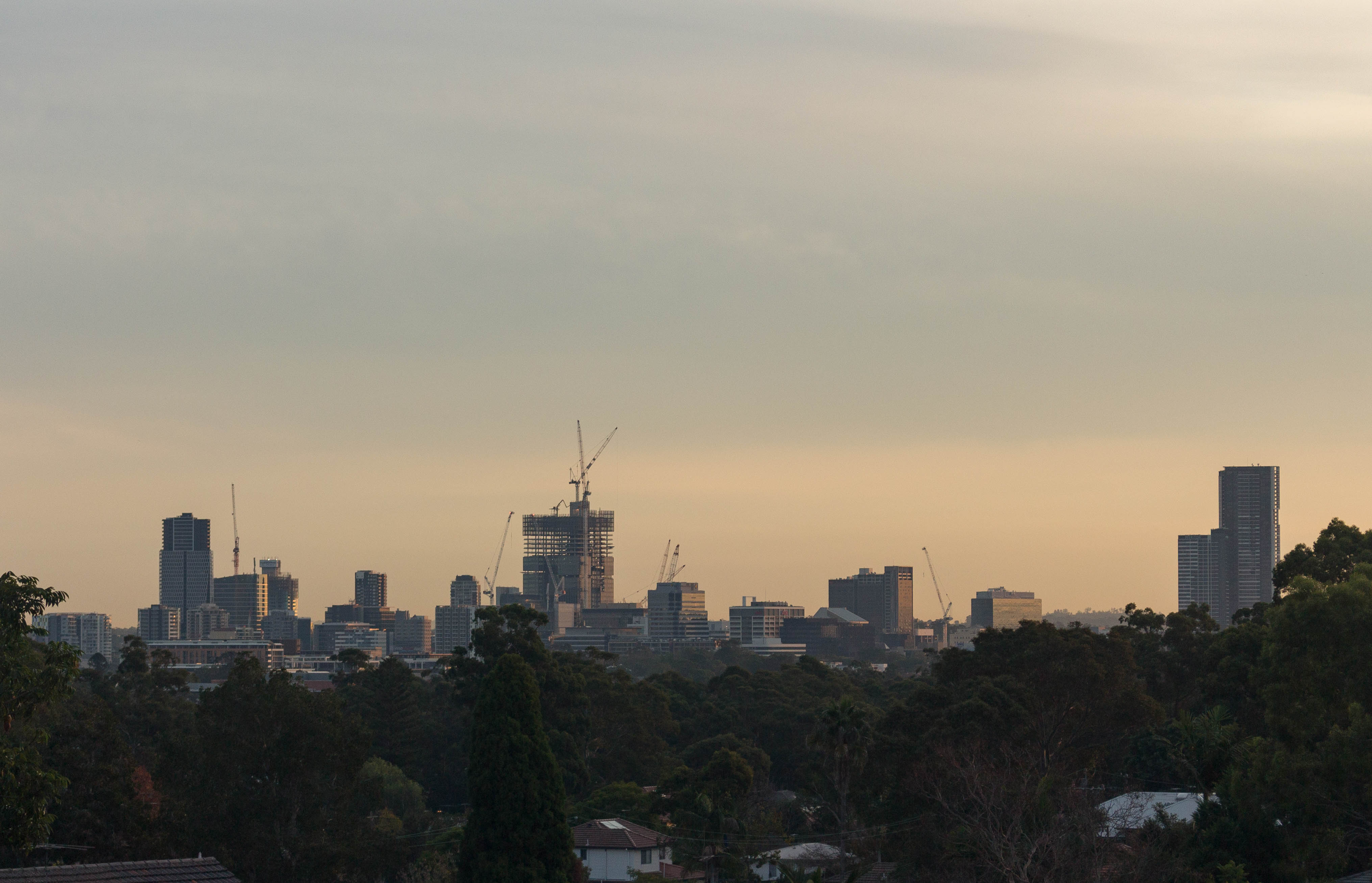
- Parramatta skyline in 2019

- Interactive map of Parramatta
- Coordinates: 33°48′53″S 151°0′6″E
- Country: Australia
- State: New South Wales
- Region: Greater Western Sydney Metropolitan area
- City: Sydney
- LGA: City of Parramatta
- Location: 24 km (15 mi) west of Sydney CBD (Central Sydney)
- Established: 1788

Government
  - State electorates: Parramatta; Baulkham Hills; Granville
  - Federal division: Parramatta

Area
  - Total: 5.3 km^{2} (2.0 sq mi)
- Elevation: 18 m (59 ft)

Population
  - Total: 30,211 (2021 census)
  - Density: 5,700/km^{2} (14,760/sq mi)
- Postcode: 2150
- County: Cumberland
- Parish: St John
Localities around Parramatta
Northmead	North Parramatta	Oatlands
Westmead	Parramatta	Dundas Rydalmere
Merrylands Holroyd	Harris Park	Camellia Rosehill

Parramatta (/ˌpærəˈmætə/; Dharuk: Burramatta) is a city and major commercial centre in Greater Western Sydney. It is located approximately 24 kilometres (15 mi) west of the Sydney central business district on the banks of the Parramatta River. It is commonly regarded as the second CBD of metropolitan Sydney.

Parramatta is the municipal seat of the City of Parramatta local government area and is often regarded as one of the primary centres of the Greater Sydney metropolitan region, along with the Sydney CBD, Penrith, Campbelltown, and Liverpool. It has a long history as a second administrative centre in the metropolitan region, being host to a number of government departments, as well as state and federal courts.

Founded as a British settlement in 1788 (the same year as Sydney), it is the oldest inland European settlement in Australia and serves as the economic centre of Greater Western Sydney. Since 2000, state government agencies such as the New South Wales Police Force and Sydney Water have relocated to Parramatta from Central Sydney. The 151st meridian east runs directly through the suburb.

== History ==
=== Aboriginal ===
Radiocarbon dating suggests human activity occurred in Parramatta from around 30,000 years ago. The Dharug people who lived in the area before European settlement regarded the area as rich in food from the river and forests. They named the area Baramada or Burramatta ('Parramatta') which means Eel ("Burra") Place ("matta"), with the resident Indigenous people being called the Burramattagal. Similar Darug words include Cabramatta (Grub place) and Wianamatta (Mother place). Other references are derived from the words of captain Watkin Tench, a white British man with a poor understanding of the Darug language, and are incorrect. To this day many eels and other sea creatures are attracted to nutrients that are concentrated where the saltwater of Port Jackson meets the freshwater of the Parramatta River. The Parramatta Eels rugby league club chose their symbol as a result of this phenomenon.

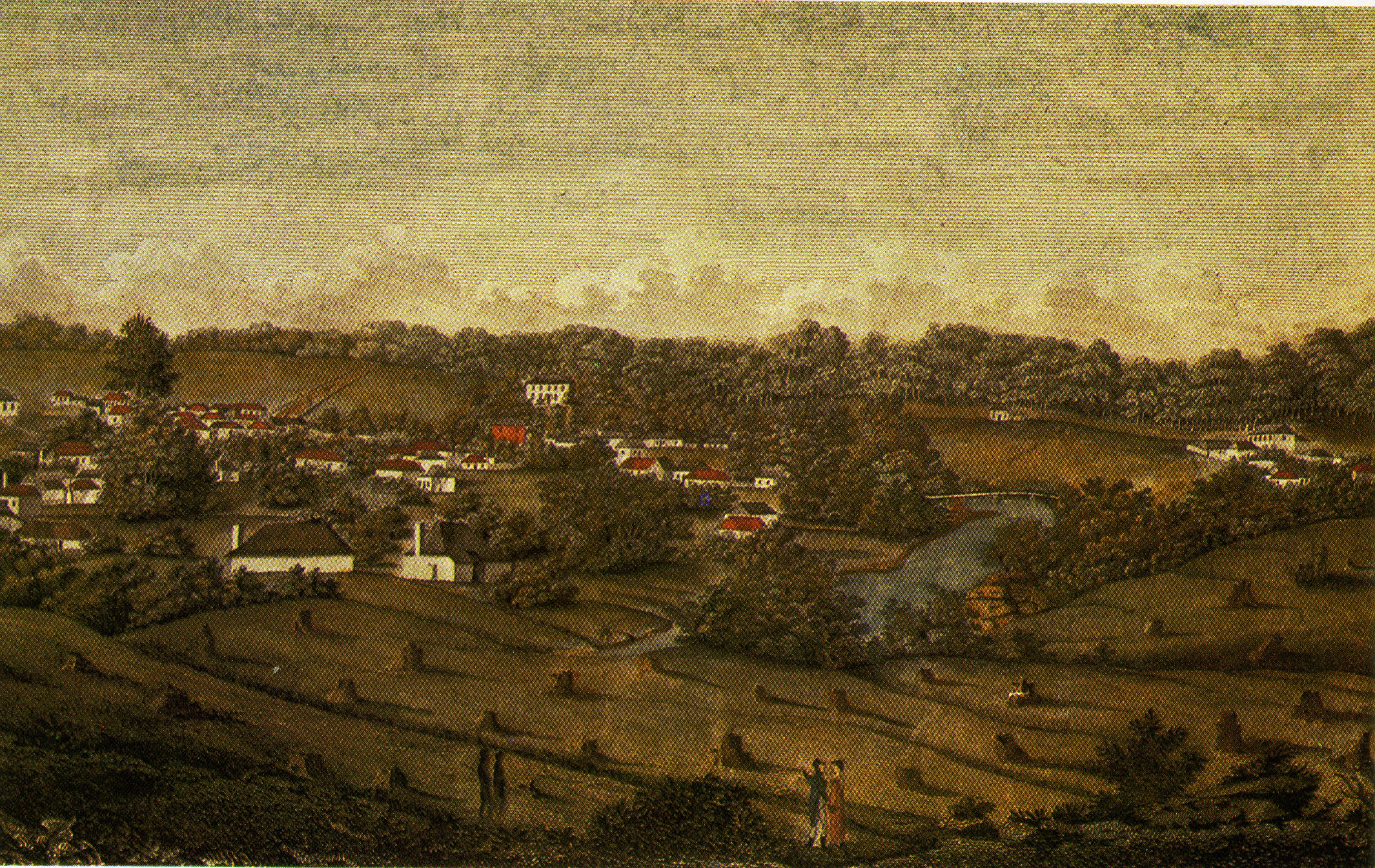
View of Parramatta in 1812

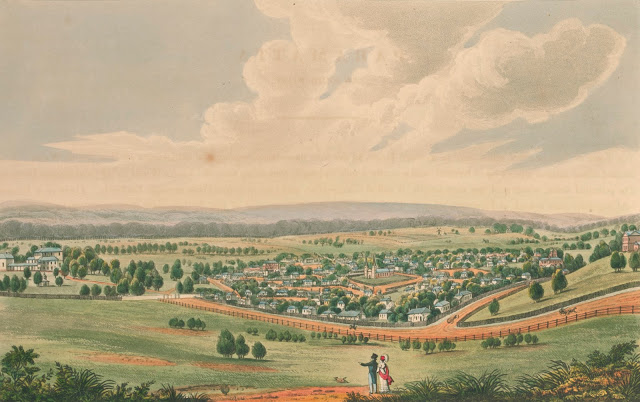
Parramatta from May's Hill by Joseph Lycett (c. 1824)

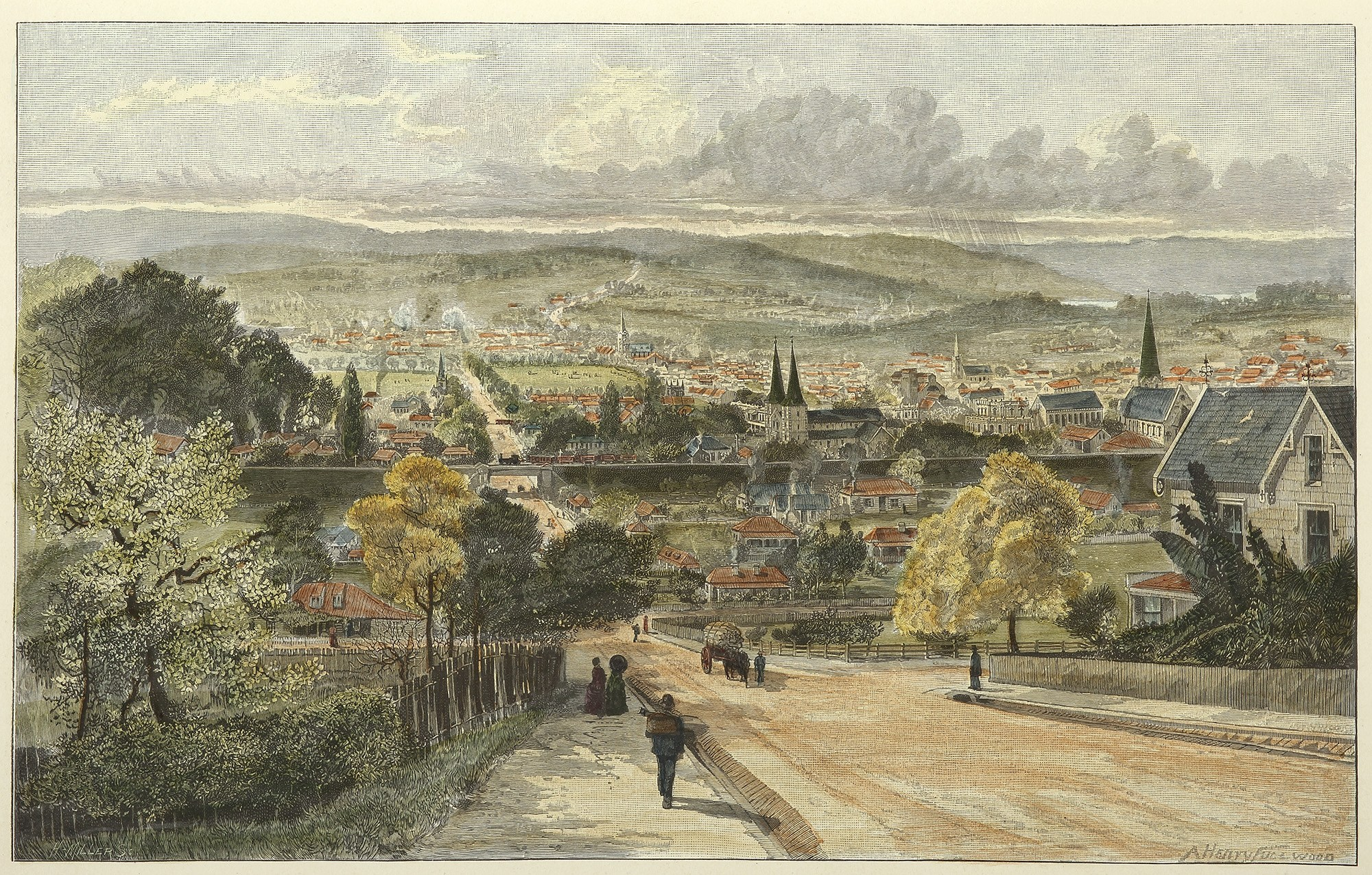
Parramatta in 1886

=== British colonisation ===
Parramatta was established by the British in 1788, the same year as Sydney. As such, Parramatta is the second oldest city in Australia, being only 10 months younger than Sydney. The British colonists, who had arrived in January 1788 on the First Fleet at Sydney Cove, had only enough food to support themselves for a short time and the soil around Sydney Cove proved too poor to grow the amount of food that 1,000 convicts, soldiers and administrators needed to survive. During 1788, Governor Arthur Phillip had reconnoitred several places before choosing Parramatta as the most likely place for a successful large farm. Parramatta was the furthest navigable point inland on the Parramatta River (i.e. furthest from the thin, sandy coastal soil) and also the point at which the river became freshwater and therefore useful for farming.

On Sunday 2 November 1788, governor Phillip took a detachment of marines along with a surveyor and, in boats, made his way upriver to a location that he called The Crescent, a defensible hill curved round a river bend, now in Parramatta Park. The Burramattagal were rapidly displaced with notable residents Maugoran, Boorong and Baludarri being forced from their lands.

As a settlement developed, governor Phillip gave it the name "Rose Hill" after British politician George Rose. On 4 June 1791 Phillip changed the name of the township to Parramatta, approximating the term used by the local Aboriginal people. A neighbouring suburb acquired the name "Rose Hill", which today is spelt "Rosehill".

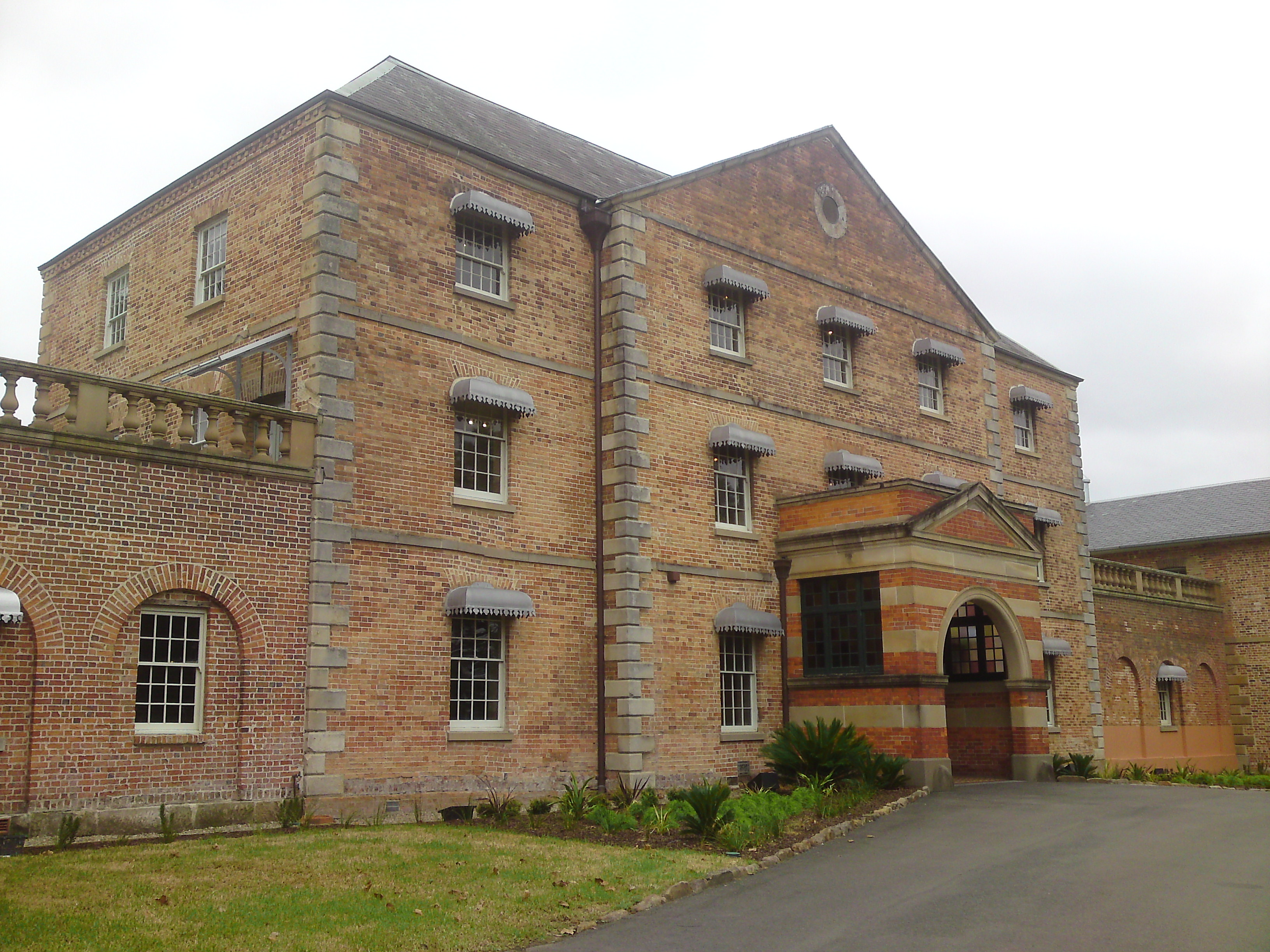
The former Female Orphan School was one of the first schools in the area.

In an attempt to deal with the food crisis, Phillip in 1789 granted a convict named James Ruse the land of Experiment Farm at Parramatta on the condition that he develop a viable agriculture. There, Ruse became the first European to successfully grow grain in Australia. The Parramatta area was also the site of the pioneering of the Australian wool industry by John Macarthur's Elizabeth Farm in the 1790s. Philip Gidley King's account of his visit to Parramatta on 9 April 1790 is one of the earliest descriptions of the area. Walking four miles with Governor Phillip to Prospect, he saw undulating grassland interspersed with magnificent trees and a great number of kangaroos and emus.

The Battle of Parramatta, a major battle of the Australian frontier wars, occurred in March 1797 where Eora leader Pemulwuy led a group of Bidjigal warriors, estimated to be at least 100, in an attack on the town of Parramatta. The local garrison withdrew to their barracks and Pemulwuy held the town until he was eventually shot and wounded. A year later, a government farm at Toongabbie was attacked by Pemulwuy, who challenged the New South Wales Corps to a fight.

Governor Arthur Phillip built a small house for himself on the hill of The Crescent. In 1799 this was replaced by a larger residence which was substantially improved by governor Lachlan Macquarie from 1815 to 1818 and has survived to the present day, making it the oldest surviving Government House anywhere in Australia. It was used as a retreat by governors until the 1850s, with governor Thomas Brisbane making it his principal home for a short period in the 1820s.

In 1803, another famous incident occurred in Parramatta, involving a convicted criminal named Joseph Samuel, originally from England. Samuel was convicted of murder and sentenced to death by hanging, but the rope broke. In the second attempt, the noose slipped off his neck. In the third attempt, the new rope broke. Governor Philip Gidley King was summoned and pardoned Samuel, as the incident appeared to him to be divine intervention.

In 1814, Macquarie opened a school for Aboriginal children at Parramatta as part of a policy of improving relations between Aboriginal and European communities. This school was later relocated to "Black Town".

In 1821-22, Parramatta Observatory was established by the Governor of New South Wales, Sir Thomas Brisbane. It was the first permanent astronomical observatory in Australia for cataloguing southern stars. It closed in 1847 and only the stone piers of its transit telescope remain.

=== Post-federation ===
Parramatta was gazetted as a city on 19 November 1976, and later, a suburb on 10 June 1994.

On 20 December 2024, the first stage of the Parramatta Light Rail was completed.

== Climate ==
Parramatta has a humid subtropical climate (Köppen climate classification: Cfa) with mild to cool, somewhat short winters and warm to usually hot summers, alongside moderate rainfall spread throughout the year.

Summer maximum temperatures are quite variable, often reaching above 35 °C (95 °F), on average 13.1 days in the summer season, and sometimes remaining in the low 20s, especially after a cold front or a sea breeze, such as the southerly buster. Northwesterlies can occasionally bring hot winds from the desert that can raise temperatures higher than 40 °C (104 °F) mostly from November to February, and sometimes above 44 °C (111 °F) in January severe heatwaves. The record highest temperature (since 1967) was 47.0 °C (116.6 °F) on 4 January 2020. Parramatta is warmer than Sydney CBD in the summer due to the urban heat island effect and its inland location. In extreme cases though, it can be 5–10 °C (9–18 °F) warmer than Sydney, especially when sea breezes do not penetrate inland on hot summer and spring days. For example, on 28 November 2009, the city reached 29.3 °C (84.7 °F), while Parramatta reached 39.0 °C (102.2 °F), almost 10 °C (18 °F) higher. In the summer, Parramatta, among other places in western Sydney, can often be the hottest place in the world because of the Blue Mountains trapping hot air in the region, in addition to the UHI effect.

Rainfall is slightly higher during the first three months of the year because the anticlockwise-rotating subtropical high is to the south of the country, thereby allowing moist easterlies from the Tasman Sea to penetrate the city. The second half of the year tends to be drier (late winter/spring) since the subtropical high is to the north of the city, thus permitting dry westerlies from the interior to dominate. Drier winters are also owed to its position on the leeward side of the Great Dividing Range, which block westerly cold fronts (that are more common in late winter) and thus would become foehn winds, whereby allowing decent amount of sunny days and relatively low precipitation in that period. Thunderstorms are common in the months from early spring to early autumn, occasionally quite severe thunderstorms can occur. Snow is virtually unknown, having been recorded only in 1836 and 1896. Parrammatta gets 106.6 days of clear skies annually.

Depending on the wind direction, summer weather may be humid or dry, though the humidity is mostly in the comfortable range, with the late summer/autumn period having a higher average humidity than late winter/early spring.

Climate data for Parramatta North (1991–2020 averages, 1967–present extremes)
Month	Jan	Feb	Mar	Apr	May	Jun	Jul	Aug	Sep	Oct	Nov	Dec	Year
Record high °C (°F)	47.0 (116.6)	44.5 (112.1)	40.5 (104.9)	37.0 (98.6)	29.2 (84.6)	25.5 (77.9)	26.8 (80.2)	30.6 (87.1)	36.5 (97.7)	40.1 (104.2)	42.7 (108.9)	44.0 (111.2)	47.0 (116.6)
Mean maximum °C (°F)	40.1 (104.2)	37.5 (99.5)	33.9 (93.0)	30.3 (86.5)	26.2 (79.2)	22.3 (72.1)	22.7 (72.9)	25.7 (78.3)	30.8 (87.4)	34.3 (93.7)	36.6 (97.9)	37.6 (99.7)	41.6 (106.9)
Mean daily maximum °C (°F)	29.1 (84.4)	28.3 (82.9)	26.5 (79.7)	23.9 (75.0)	20.9 (69.6)	18.2 (64.8)	17.8 (64.0)	19.5 (67.1)	22.3 (72.1)	24.5 (76.1)	25.8 (78.4)	27.7 (81.9)	23.7 (74.7)
Mean daily minimum °C (°F)	17.9 (64.2)	17.7 (63.9)	15.9 (60.6)	12.6 (54.7)	9.6 (49.3)	7.5 (45.5)	6.3 (43.3)	6.9 (44.4)	9.4 (48.9)	12.0 (53.6)	14.3 (57.7)	16.4 (61.5)	12.2 (54.0)
Mean minimum °C (°F)	12.9 (55.2)	12.7 (54.9)	10.9 (51.6)	7.8 (46.0)	4.5 (40.1)	2.9 (37.2)	1.7 (35.1)	2.4 (36.3)	4.5 (40.1)	6.5 (43.7)	8.6 (47.5)	10.9 (51.6)	1.2 (34.2)
Record low °C (°F)	10.1 (50.2)	9.2 (48.6)	6.8 (44.2)	4.0 (39.2)	1.4 (34.5)	0.8 (33.4)	−1.0 (30.2)	0.7 (33.3)	0.7 (33.3)	3.6 (38.5)	4.0 (39.2)	7.7 (45.9)	−1.0 (30.2)
Average precipitation mm (inches)	89.9 (3.54)	130.3 (5.13)	99.1 (3.90)	78.3 (3.08)	61.3 (2.41)	99.0 (3.90)	48.0 (1.89)	47.4 (1.87)	48.5 (1.91)	61.3 (2.41)	82.0 (3.23)	78.5 (3.09)	923.6 (36.36)
Average precipitation days (≥ 1 mm)	8.6	9.0	9.9	7.0	6.3	7.9	6.0	4.8	5.7	7.0	8.7	8.3	89.2
Average afternoon relative humidity (%)	56	59	58	56	59	58	55	45	46	50	54	55	54
Average dew point °C (°F)	16.2 (61.2)	16.8 (62.2)	15.5 (59.9)	12.7 (54.9)	9.9 (49.8)	7.6 (45.7)	5.6 (42.1)	5.5 (41.9)	7.7 (45.9)	9.9 (49.8)	12.3 (54.1)	14.3 (57.7)	11.2 (52.2)
Source: Bureau of Meteorology

== Commercial area ==
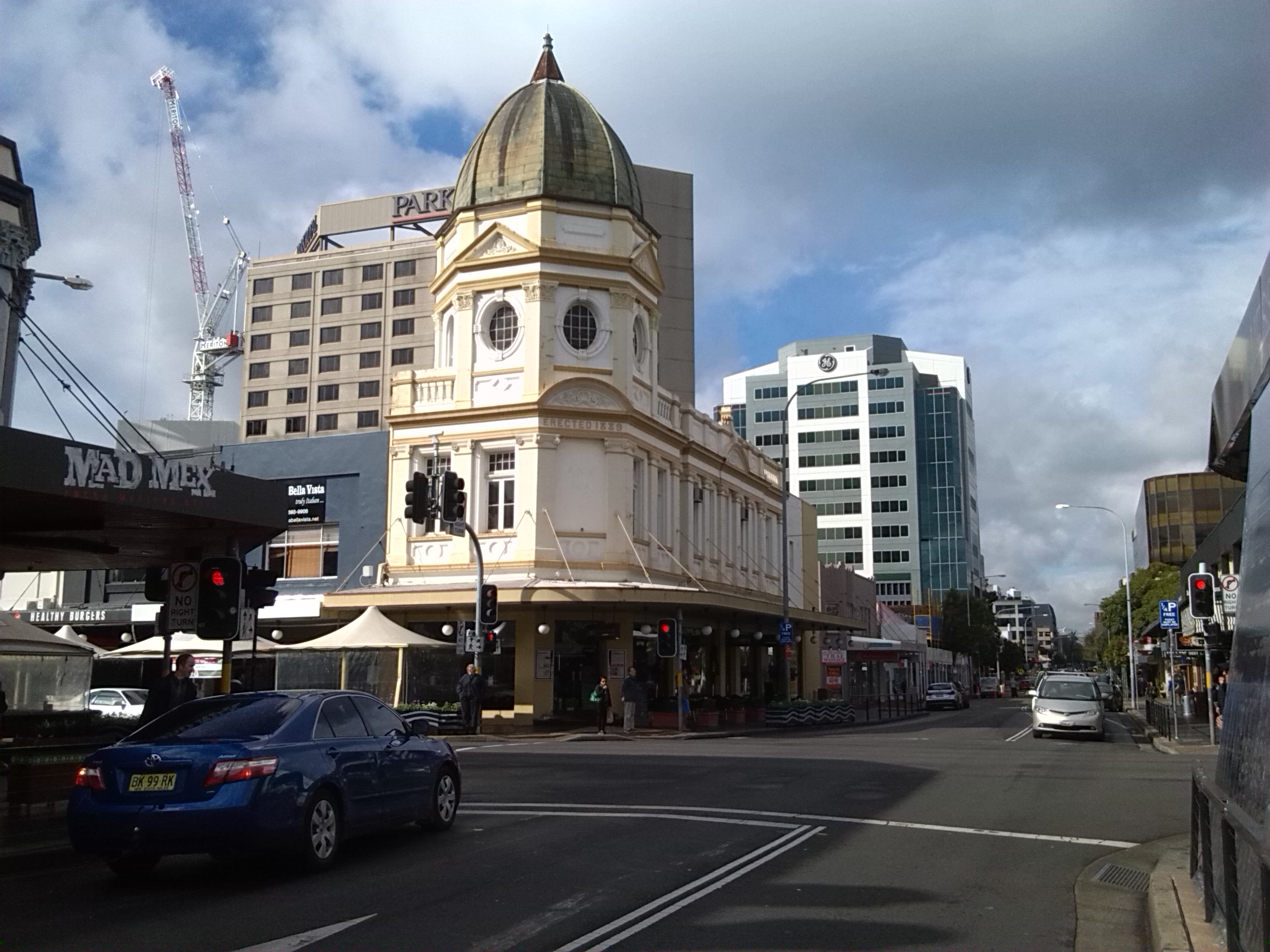
Church Street

Church Street is home to many shops and restaurants. The northern end of Church Street, close to Lennox Bridge, features al fresco dining with a diverse range of cuisines. Immediately south of the CBD Church Street is known across Sydney as 'Auto Alley' for the many car dealerships lining both sides of the street as far as the M4 Motorway.

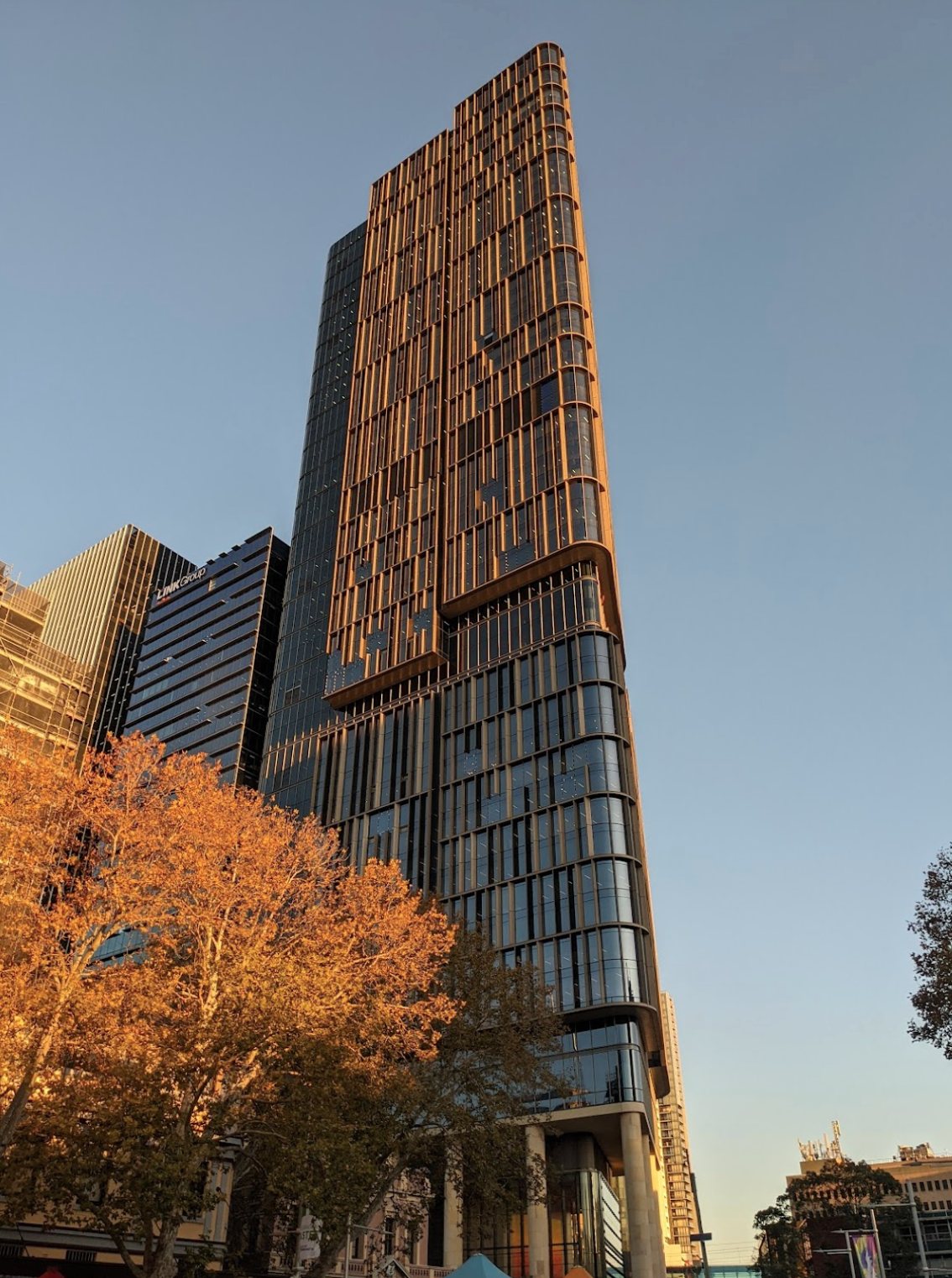
6 & 8 Parramatta Square, Parramatta's tallest building

Since 2000, Parramatta has seen the consolidation of its role as a government centre, with the relocation of agencies such as the New South Wales Police Force Headquarters and the Sydney Water Corporation from Sydney CBD. At the same time, major construction work occurred around the railway station with the expansion of Westfield Shoppingtown and the creation of a new transport interchange. The western part of the Parramatta CBD is known as the Parramatta Justice Precinct and houses the corporate headquarters of the Department of Communities and Justice. Other legal offices include the Children's Court of New South Wales and the Sydney West Trial Courts, Legal Aid Commission of NSW, Office of Trustee and Guardian (formerly the Office of the Protective Commissioner), NSW Registry of Births, Deaths and Marriages, and the Office of the Director of Public Prosecutions. Nearby on Marsden Street is the Parramatta Courthouse and the Drug Court of New South Wales. The Garfield Barwick Commonwealth Law Courts Building (named in honour of Sir Garfield Barwick), houses courts of the Federal Magistrates Court and the Family Court of Australia. The NSW Government has also announced plans to secure up to 45,000 m^{2} of new A-grade leased office space in Parramatta to relocate a further 4,000 workers from the Sydney CBD.

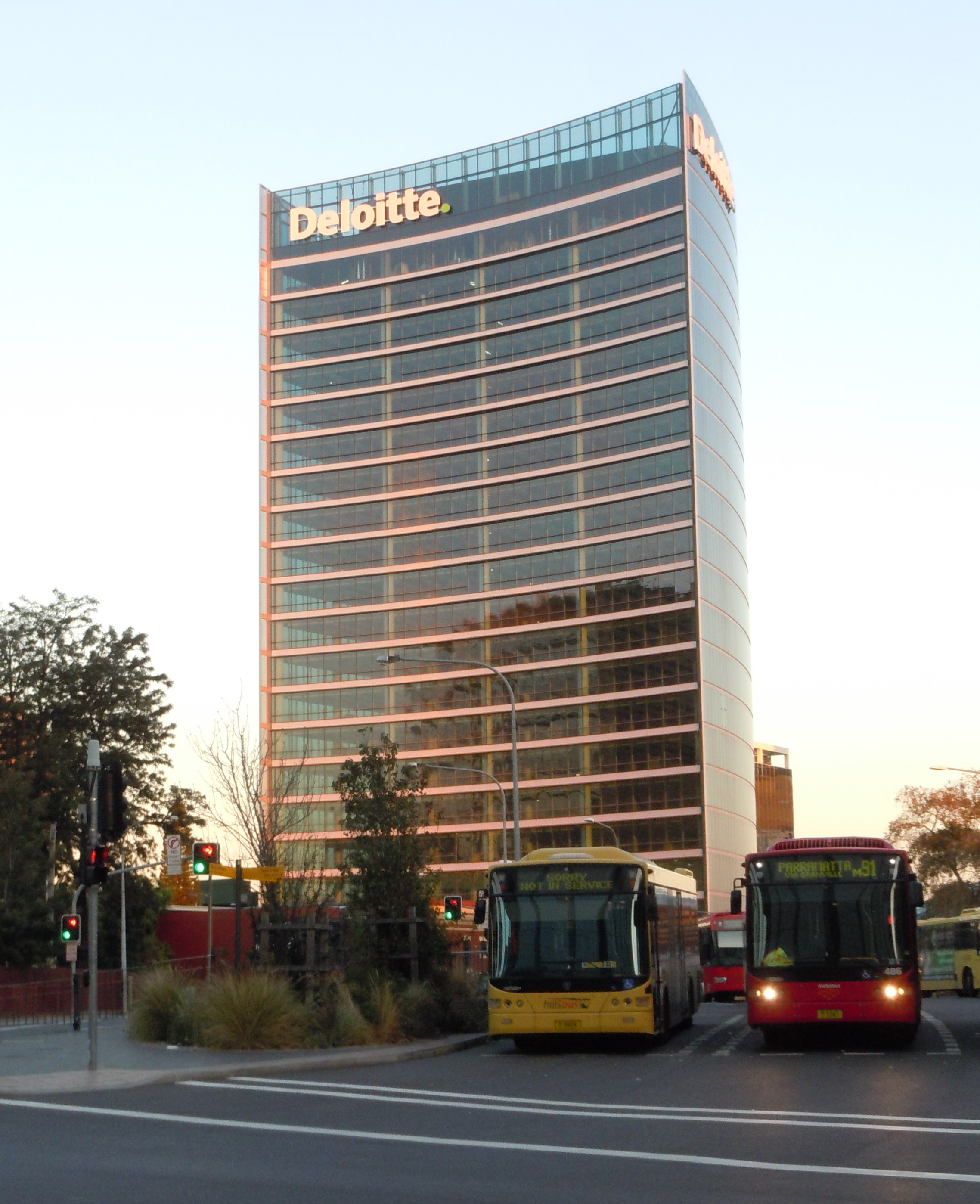
Eclipse Tower

Parramatta Square (previously known as Civic Place) is a civic precinct located in the heart of the city, adjacent to Parramatta Town Hall. The Parramatta Square construction works included a redevelopment of the Parramatta Civic Centre, construction of a new culture and arts centre, and the construction of a new plaza. The designs of the first two projects, a 65-storey residential skyscraper and an office building were announced on 20 July 2012. Concerns from CASA about infringements into controlled airspace from the height of the residential tower resulted in 8 Parramatta Square being turned into a 55-story commercial building, rather than the originally proposed 65-storey residential tower. Parramatta Square became home to 3,000 National Australia Bank employees, relocated from the Sydney CBD. Other notable commercial tenants who have established a presence at Parramatta Square include Westpac, Endeavour Energy, KPMG and Deloitte.

Centenary Square, formerly known as Centenary Plaza, was created in 1975 when the then Parramatta City Council closed a section of the main street to traffic to create a pedestrian plaza. It features an 1888 Centennial Memorial Fountain and adjoins the 1883 Parramatta Town Hall and St John's Cathedral.

A hospital known as The Colonial Hospital was established in Parramatta in 1818. This then became Parramatta District Hospital. Jeffery House was built in the 1940s. With the construction of the nearby Westmead Hospital complex public hospital services in Parramatta were reduced but after refurbishment Jeffery House again provides clinical health services. Nearby, Brislington House has had a long history with health services. It is the oldest colonial building in Parramatta, dating to 1821. It became a doctors residence before being incorporated into the Parramatta Hospital in 1949.

Parramatta is a major business and commercial centre, and home to Westfield Parramatta, the tenth largest shopping centre in Australia. Parramatta is also the major transport hub for Western Sydney, servicing trains and buses, as well as having a ferry wharf and future light rail and metro services. Major upgrades have occurred around Parramatta railway station with the creation of a new transport interchange, and the ongoing development of the Parramatta Square local government precinct.

Improved transport to Parramatta and moving government offices enabled the area to become dubbed as Sydney's 'second CBD'. Looking back in 2026, Jess Miller stated the planning controls changed to allow a "huge" amount of uplift, and that it made housing more affordable.

== Places of worship ==
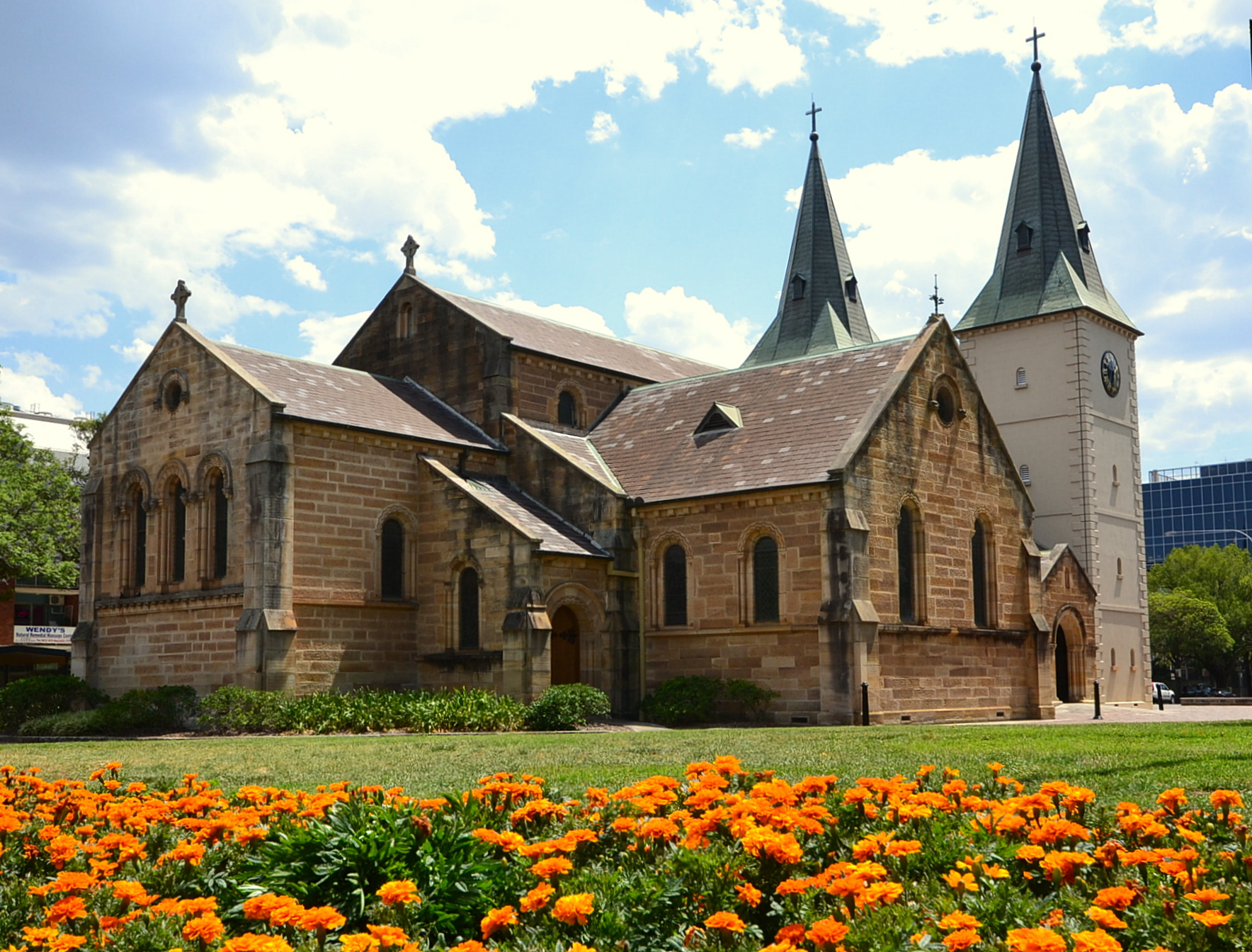
St John's Cathedral was completed in 1802

Church Street takes its name from St John's Cathedral (Anglican), which was built in 1802 and is the oldest church in Parramatta. While the present building is not the first on the site, the towers were built during the time of Governor Macquarie, and were based on those of the church at Reculver, England, at the suggestion of his wife, Elizabeth. The historic St John's Cemetery is located nearby on O'Connell Street.

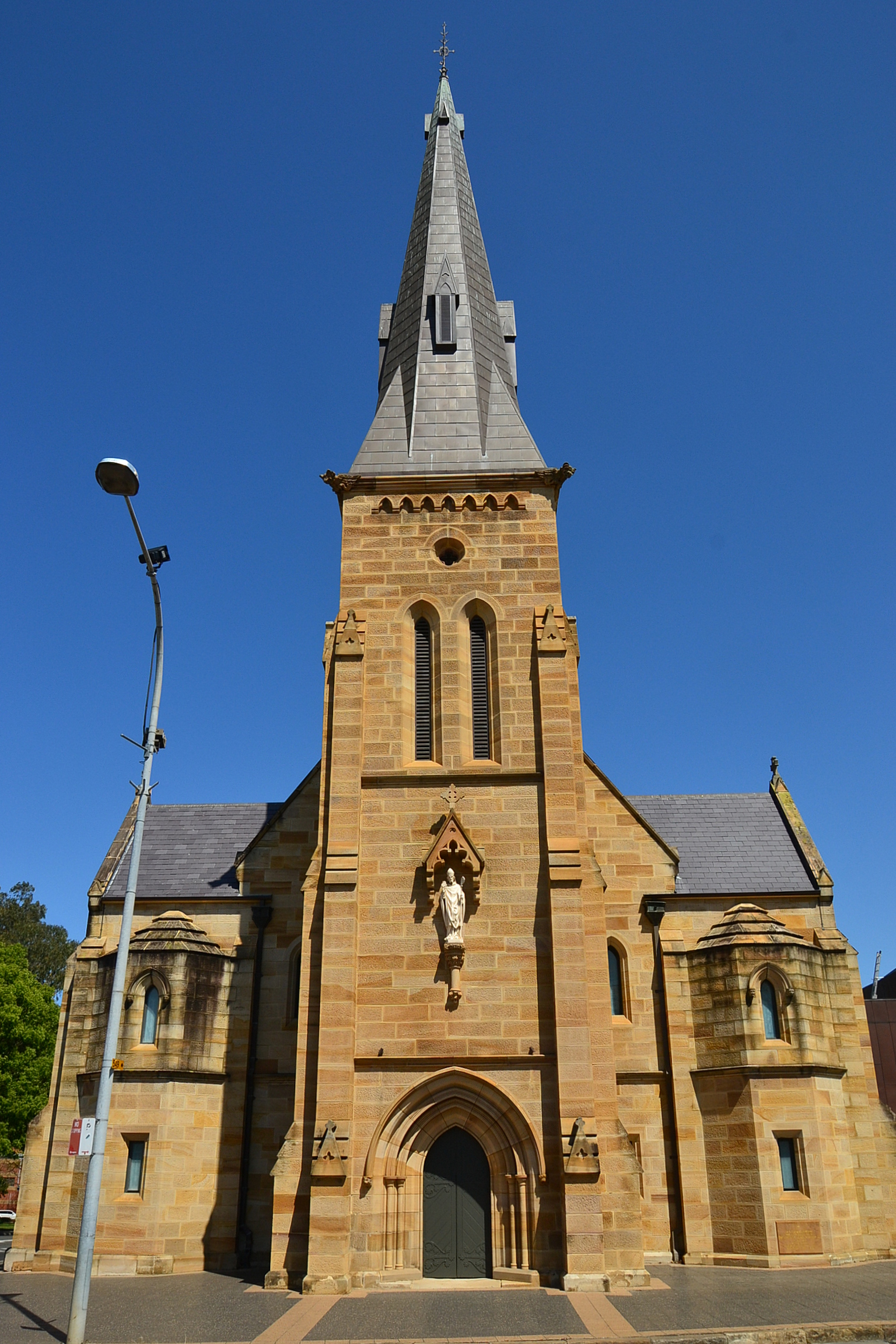
St Patrick's Cathedral

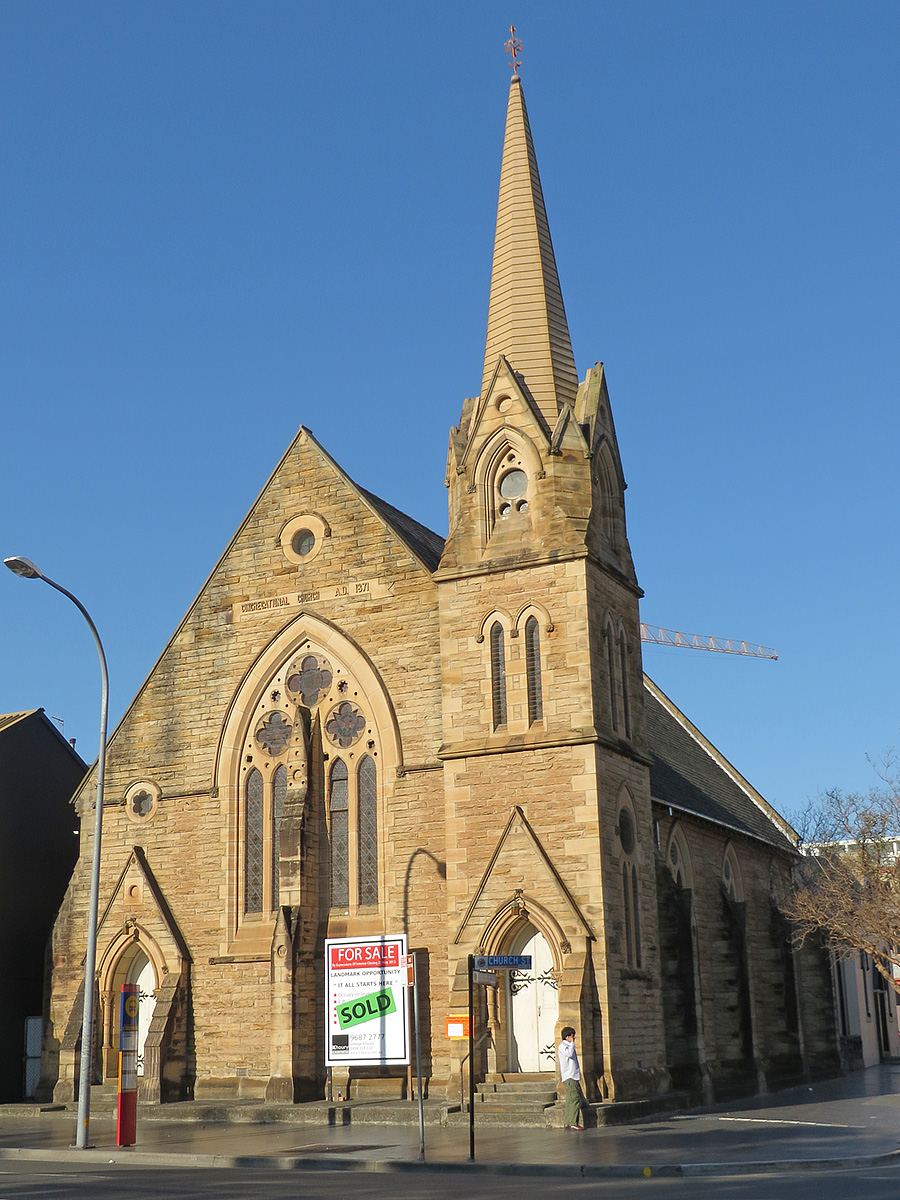
Congregational Church (1871)

St Patrick's Cathedral (Roman Catholic) is one of the oldest Catholic churches in Australia. Construction commenced in 1836, but it wasn't officially complete until 1837. In 1854 a new church was commissioned, although the tower was not completed until 1880, with the spire following in 1883. It was built on the site to meet the needs of a growing congregation. It was destroyed by fire in 1996, with only the stone walls remaining.

On 29 November 2003, the new St Patrick's Cathedral was dedicated. The historic St Patrick's Cemetery is located in North Parramatta. The Uniting Church is represented by Leigh Memorial Church. Parramatta Salvation Army is one of the oldest active Salvation Army Corps in Australia. Parramatta is also home to the Parramatta and Districts Synagogue, which services the Jewish community of western Sydney.

The Greek Orthodox Parish and Community of St Ioannis (St John The Frontrunner) Greek Orthodox Church was established in Parramatta in May 1960 under the ecumenical jurisdiction of the Greek Orthodox Archdiocese of Australia to serve the predominantly emigrating Greek population of Greater Western Sydney. Originally, the liturgies were held in the hall of St John's Ambulance Brigade in Harris Park until the completion of the church in December 1966 located in Hassall Street Parramatta. The parish sold this property in 2014 and is now located at the corner of George and Purchase Streets. The Parish Community of St Ioannis continues to serve over 5,000 Greek parishioners.

A Buddhist temple is located in Cowper Street, Parramatta. Parramatta's Mosque is in an apartment building on Marsden Street, Parramatta. The district is served by BAPS Swaminarayan Hindu temple located on Eleanor St, Rosehill, and a Murugan Hindu temple in Mays Hill, off Great Western Highway.

== Parks ==
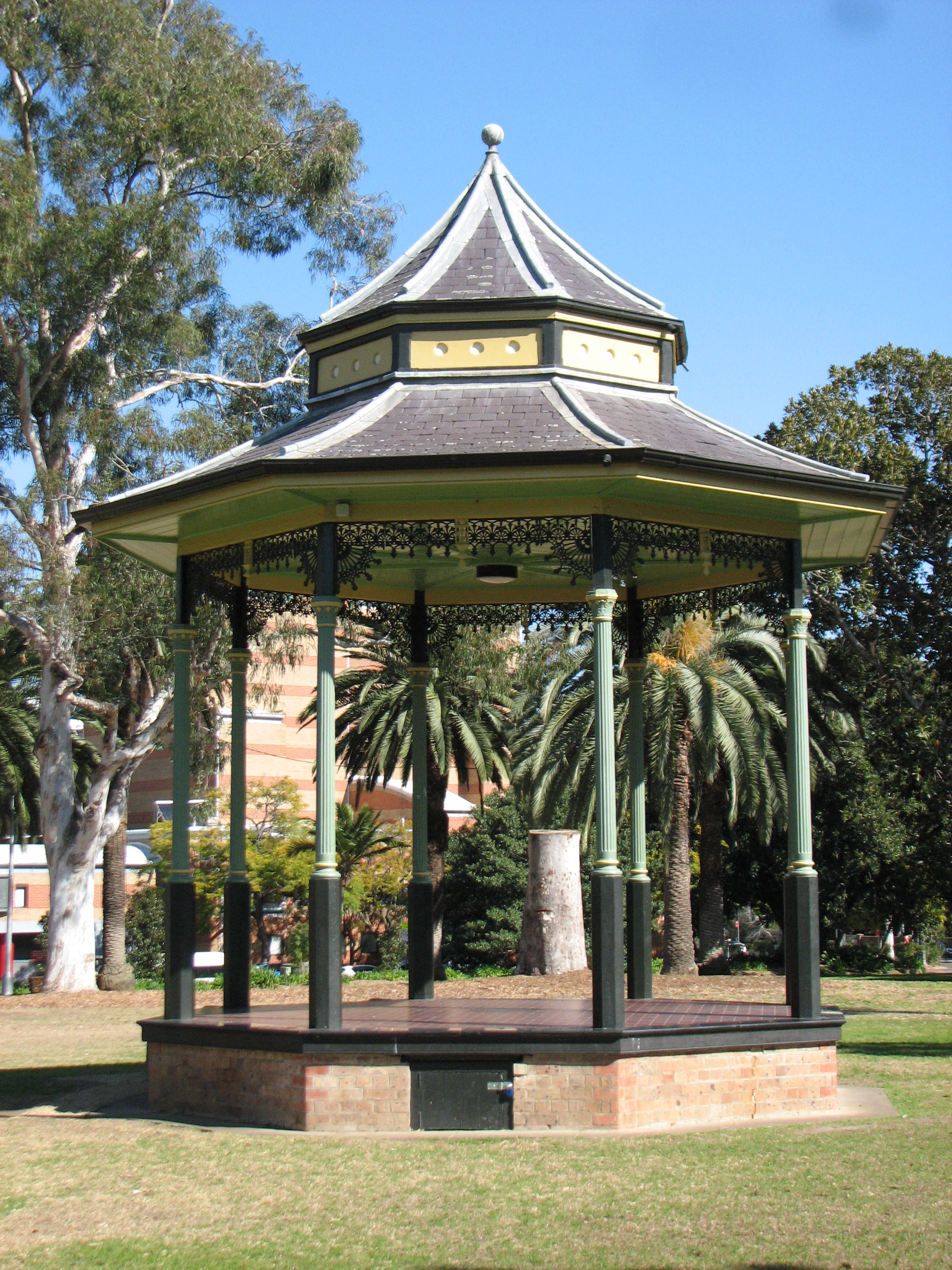
Victorian Gazebo at the Prince Alfred Square

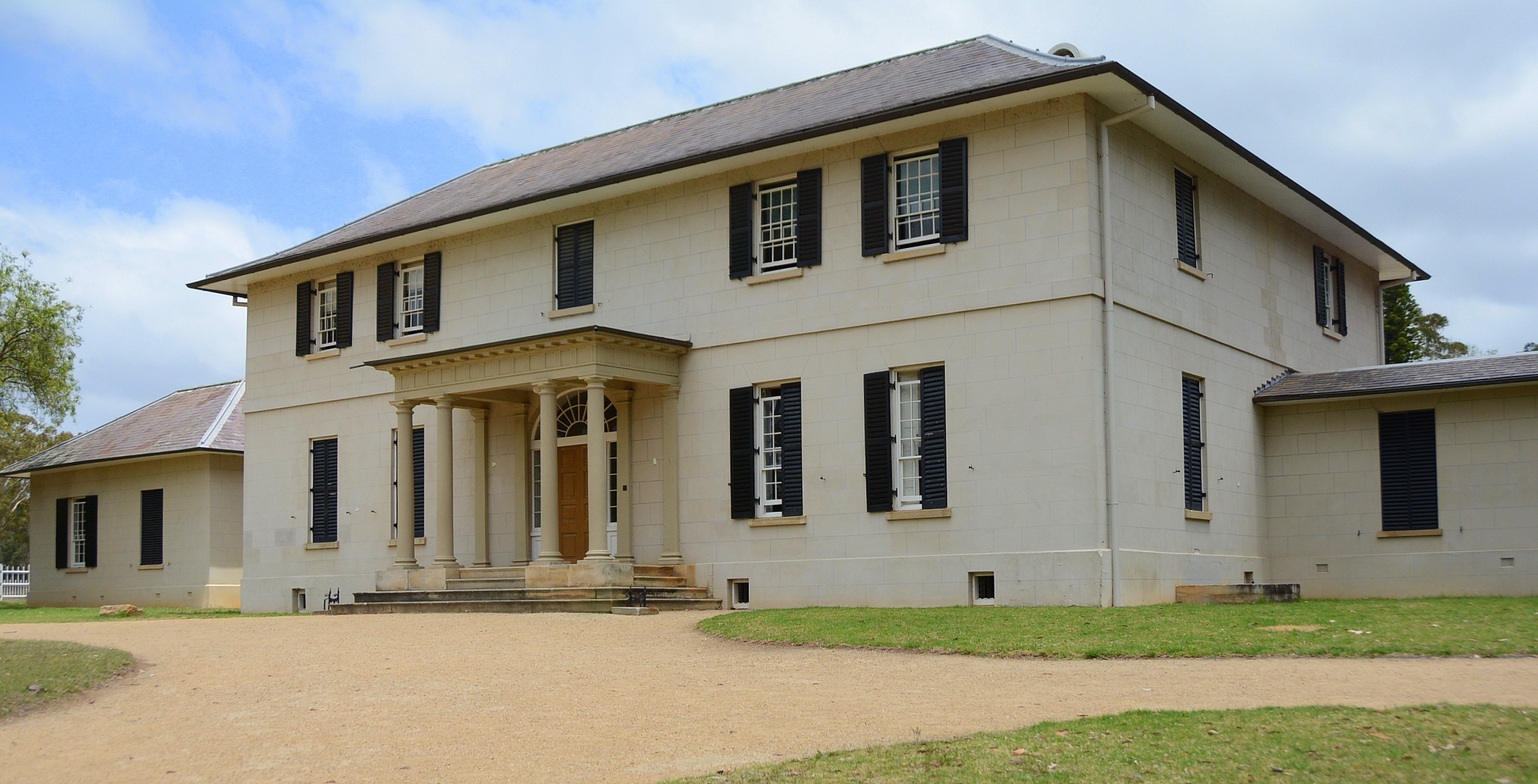
The Old Government House is a major site of significance in Parramatta Park.

Parramatta Park is a large park adjacent to Western Sydney Stadium that is a popular venue for walking, jogging and bike riding. It was formerly the Governor's Domain, being land set aside for the Governor to supply his farming needs, until it was gazetted as a public park in 1858. As the Governor's Domain, the grounds were considerably larger than the current 85 hectare Parramatta Park, extending from Parramatta Road in the south as evident by a small gatehouse adjacent to Parramatta High School. For a time Parramatta Park housed a zoo until 1951 when the animals were transferred to Taronga Zoo.

Parramatta is known as the 'River City' as the Parramatta River flows through the Parramatta CBD. Its foreshore features a playground, seating, picnic tables and pathways that are increasingly popular with residents, visitors and CBD workers.

Prince Alfred Square is a Victorian era park located within the CBD on the northern side of the Parramatta River. It is one of the oldest public parks in New South Wales with trees dating from c. 1869. Prior to being a public park, it was the site of Parramatta's second gaol from 1804 until 1841 and the first female factory in Australia between 1804 and 1821.

== Transport ==
In contrast to the high level of car dependency throughout Sydney, a greater proportion of Parramatta's workers travelled to work on public transport (45.2%) than by car (36.2%) in 2016.

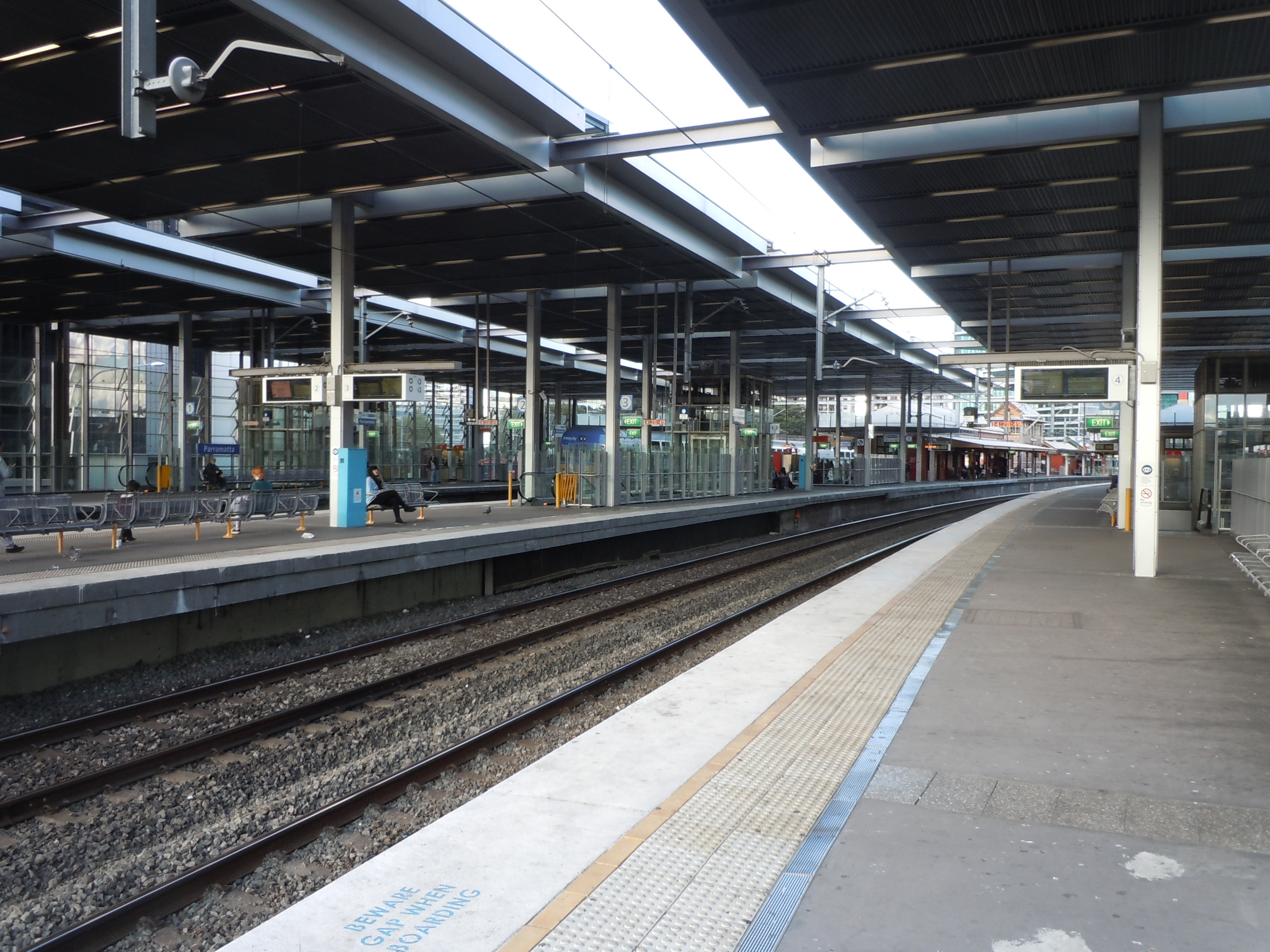
Parramatta railway station

=== Rail ===
==== Heavy rail ====
Parramatta railway station is served by Sydney Trains' T5 Cumberland Line, T2 Leppington & Inner West Line and T1 North Shore & Western Line train services. NSW TrainLink operates intercity services on the Blue Mountains Line as well as services to rural New South Wales. The station was originally opened in 1855, located in what is now Granville, and known as Parramatta Junction. The station was moved to its current location and opened on 4 July 1860, five years after the first railway line in Sydney was opened, running from Sydney to Parramatta Junction. It was upgraded in the 2000s, with work beginning in late 2003 and the new interchange opening on 19 February 2006.

==== Light rail ====
The light rail Westmead & Carlingford Line runs from Westmead to Carlingford via the Parramatta city centre. A future branch will run to Sydney Olympic Park.

==== Metro ====
The under construction Sydney Metro West will be a metro line run between the Sydney central business district and Westmead. Announced in 2016, the line is set to open in 2032 with a station in Parramatta.

=== Bus ===
Parramatta is also serviced by a major bus interchange located on the south eastern side of the railway station. The interchange is served by buses utilising the North-West T-way to Rouse Hill and the Liverpool–Parramatta T-way to Liverpool.

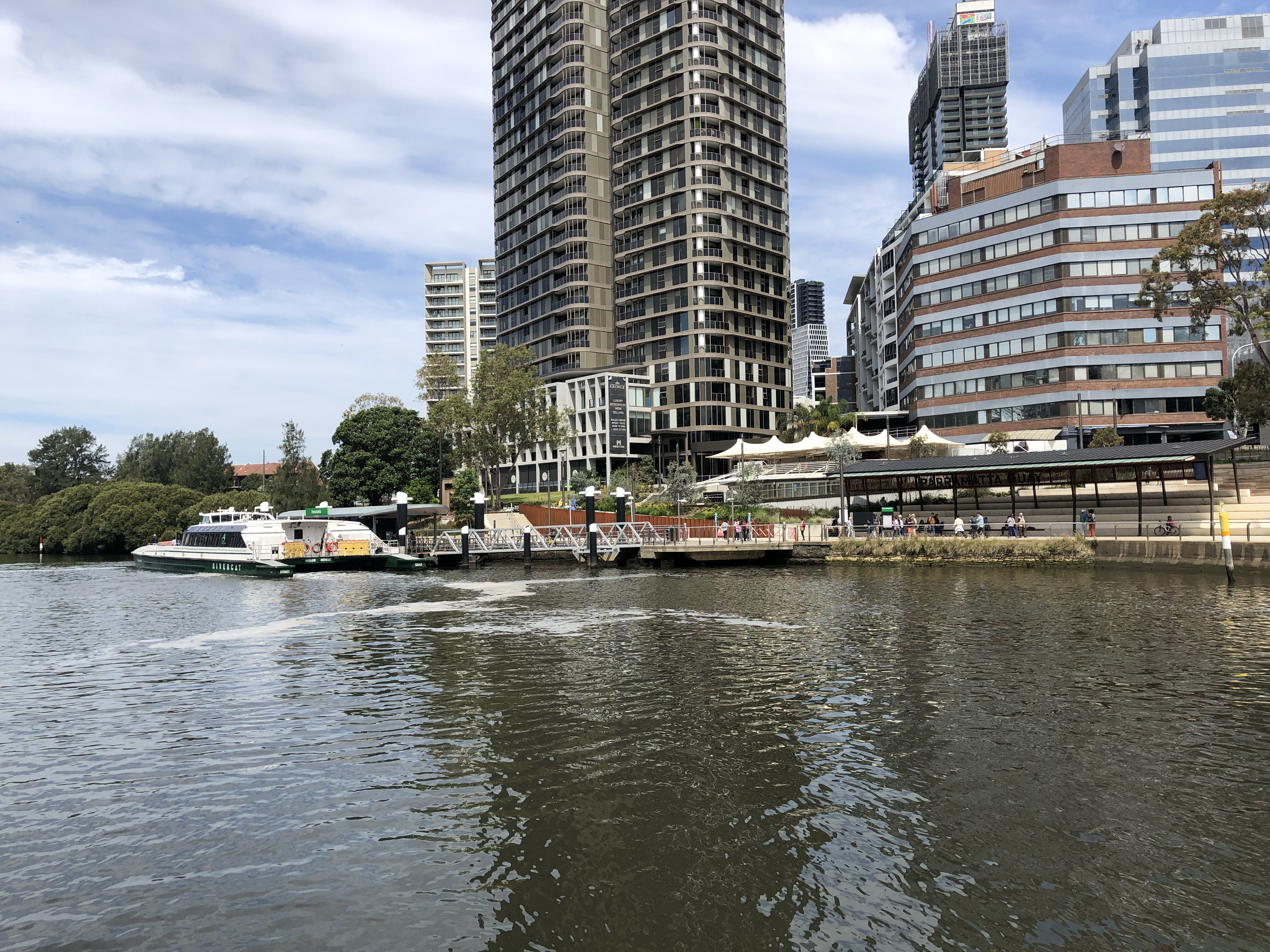
Parramatta ferry wharf

=== Ferry ===
The Parramatta ferry wharf is at the Charles Street Weir, which divides the tidal saltwater from the freshwater of the upper river, on the eastern boundary of the Central Business District. The wharf is the westernmost destination of Sydney Ferries' Parramatta River ferry services.

=== Road ===
Parramatta Road has always been an important thoroughfare for Sydney from its earliest days. From Parramatta the major western road for the state is the Great Western Highway. The M4 Western Motorway, running parallel to the Great Western Highway has taken much of the traffic away from these roads, with entrance and exit ramps close to Parramatta.

James Ruse Drive serves as a partial ring-road circling around the eastern part of Parramatta to join with the Cumberland Highway to the north west of the city.

The main north-south route through Parramatta is Church Street. To the north it becomes Windsor Road, and to the south it becomes Woodville Road.

== Demographics ==
Historical population
Year	Pop.	±%
2001	17,982	—
2006	18,448	+2.6%
2011	19,745	+7.0%
2016	25,798	+30.7%
2021	30,211	+17.1%

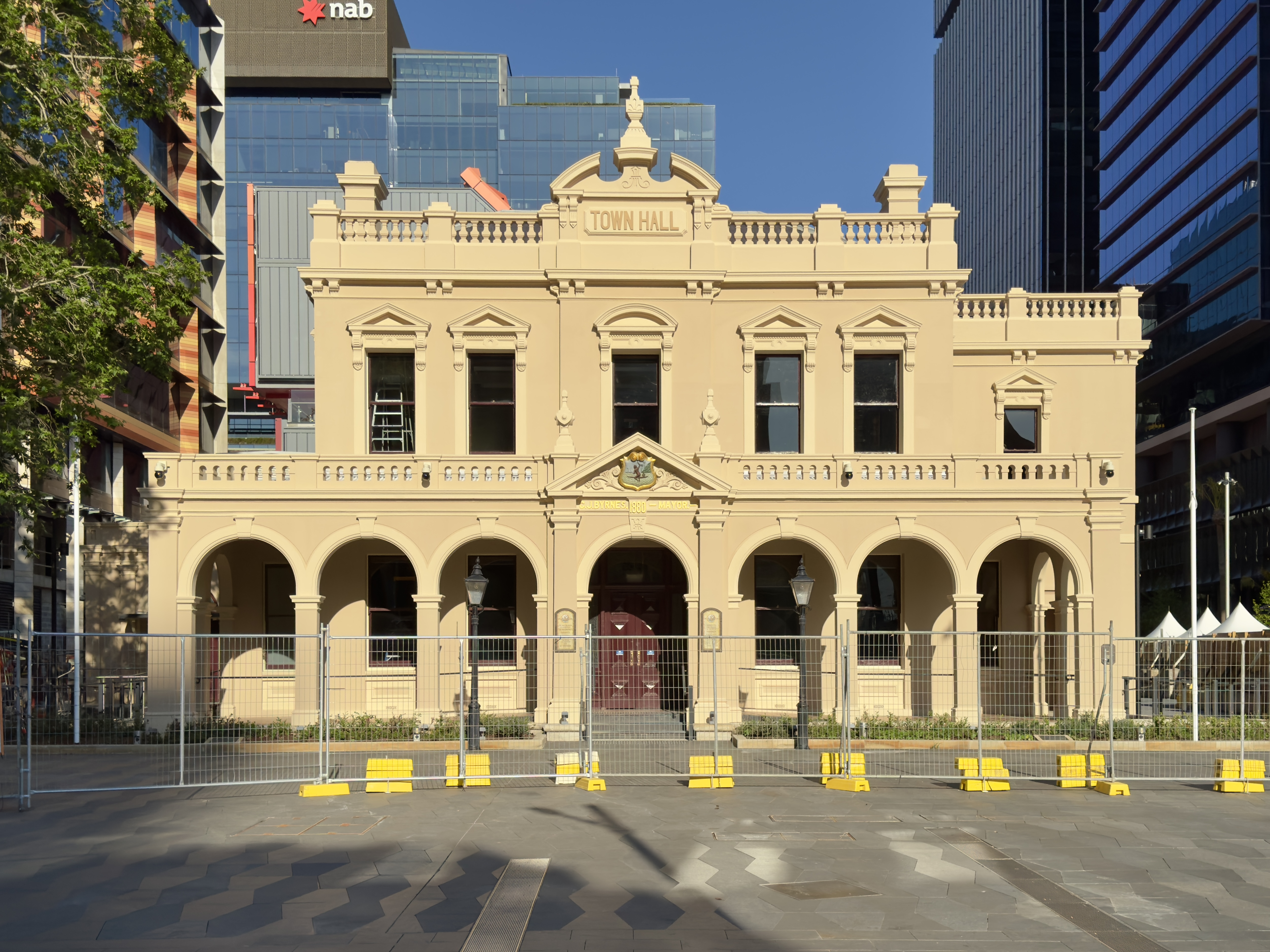
Parramatta Town Hall in 2023

According to the 2021 census conducted by the Australian Bureau of Statistics, the suburb of Parramatta had a population of 30,211. Of these:

Ethnic diversity
The most common country of birth in Parramatta is India representing 30.9% of the population, outnumbering Australian born residents at 24.8%. The next most common are China 8.9%, Nepal 5.5%, Philippines 2.5% and Iran 1.3%. However, only 6.8% identify their ancestry as Australian; the other common self-identified ancestries were Indian 27.3%, Chinese 15.3%, English 8.5% and Nepali 5.5%. About one quarter (24.4%) of people spoke English at home; other languages spoken at home included Hindi 10.4%, Mandarin 8.8%, Nepali 5.3%, Tamil 5.0% and Telugu 4.3%.

Religion
This question is optional in the census. Of the people who answered it, the most common response was Hinduism 33.6%; the next most common responses were no religion at 21.6%, Catholic at 12.1%, not stated at 7.7% and Islam at 7.5%.

Age distribution
Parramatta has an over-representation of young adults when compared to the country as a whole. Parramatta residents' median age was 32 years, compared to the national median of 38. Children aged under 15 years made up 16.3% of the population (national average is 18.2%) and people aged 65 years and over made up 6.6% of the population (national average is 17.2%).

Income
The average weekly household income was $2,092, compared to the national average of $1,746.

Housing
The majority of dwellings in Parramatta (85.6%) were flats, units or apartments; 7.7% were separate houses, and 5.7% were semi-detached (mostly townhouses). The average household size was 2.4 people.

=== Notable residents ===
- Keith Agget (1931–2017), rugby league player
- Bernie Banton (1946–2007), builder and social justice campaigner
- Richie Benaud (1930–2015), cricketer and commentator
- Allan Cunningham (1791–1839), explorer and botanist
- Greg Dyer (born 1959), cricketer
- Gerry Hazlitt (1888–1915), cricketer
- Paul Hogan (born 1939), comedian and actor
- Harry Hopman (1906–1985), tennis player
- David Lennox (1788–1873), colonial bridge builder
- John Lewin (1770–1819), first professional artist in New South Wales
- Bruce Mann (1926–2007), rugby league player
- George McIver (1859–1945), science fiction writer
- Rev. Samuel Marsden (1765–1838), known as the "flogging parson"
- Mary Cover Hassall (1799–1825), Methodist missionary to Tonga Island
- Dowell Philip O'Reilly (1865–1923), poet and politician
- Todd Payten (born 1979), rugby league player and coach
- "Jock" Ross (born 1943), outlaw biker
- Nora Kate Weston (1880–1965), artisan
- J. C. Wharton (1853–1929), editor of Parramatta Times (defunct) and a local historian

== Education ==
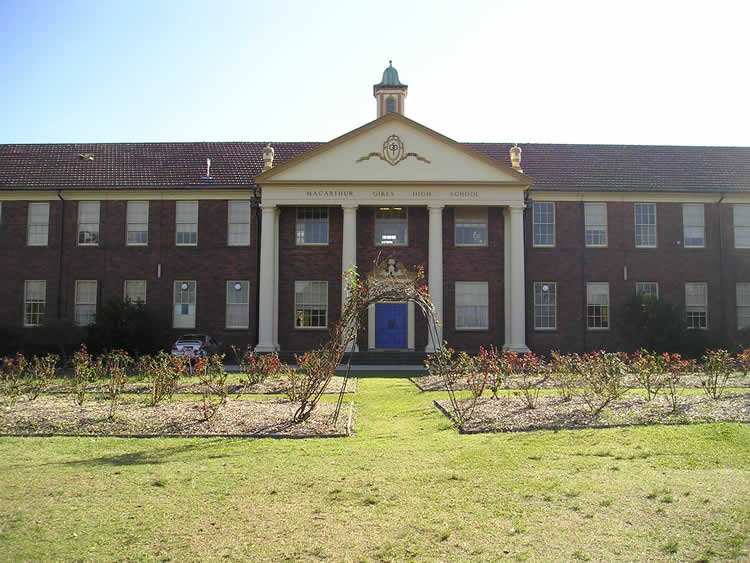
Macarthur Girls High School

Parramatta is home to several primary and secondary schools. Arthur Phillip High School was established in 1960 in its own right, in buildings which had been used continuously as a school since 1875 is the oldest continuously operating public school in Parramatta. Parramatta High School was the first coeducational school in the Sydney metropolitan area established in 1913. Our Lady of Mercy College is one of the oldest Catholic schools in Australia. Macarthur Girls High School is successor to an earlier school 'Parramatta Commercial and Household Arts School'. Others schools include Parramatta Public School, Parramatta East Public School, Parramatta West Public School, and St Patrick's Primary Parramatta.

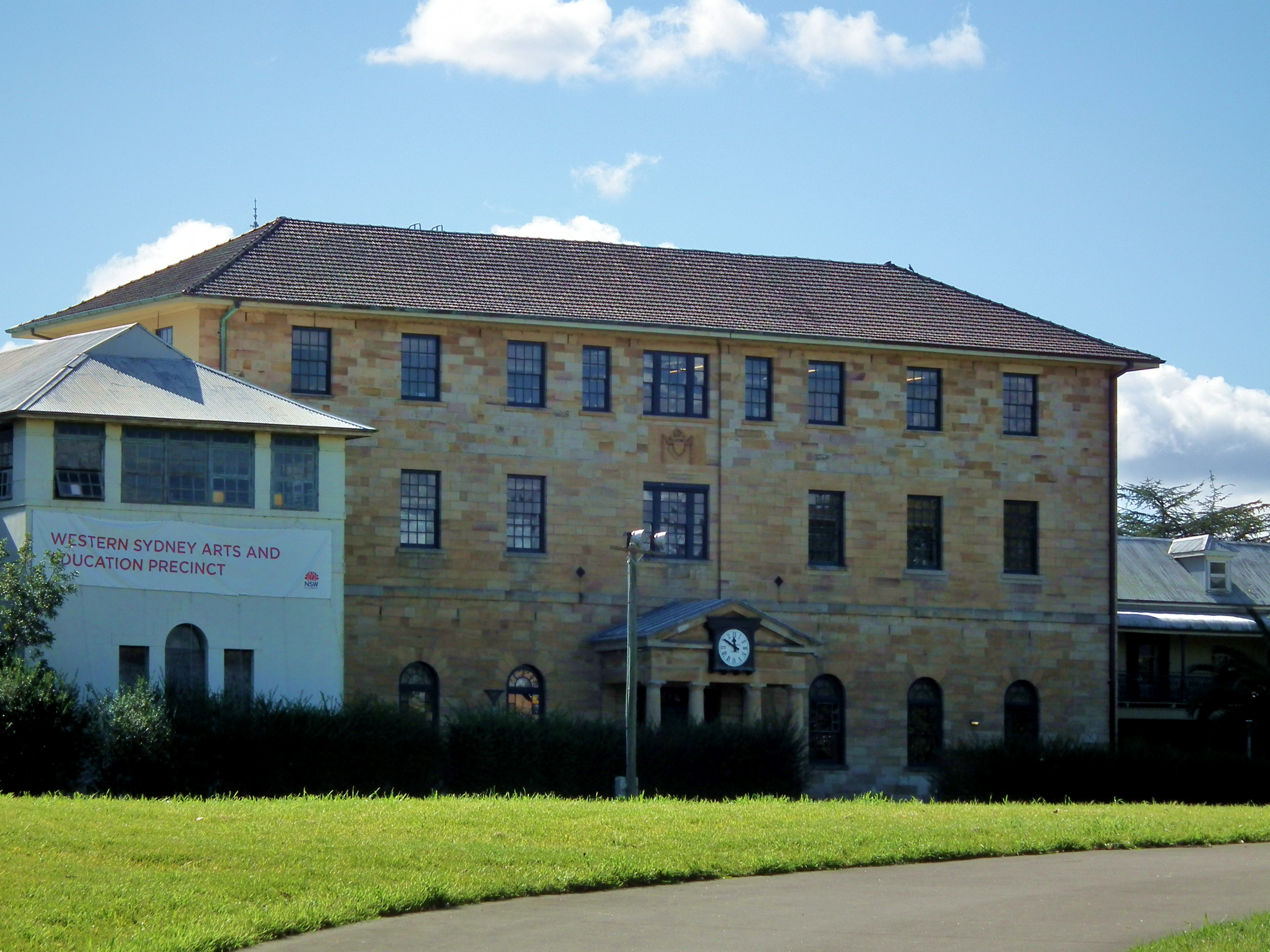
Old King's School

Several tertiary education facilities are also located within Parramatta. A University of New England study centre and two Western Sydney University campuses are situated in Parramatta. The Western Sydney University Parramatta Campus consists of two sites: Parramatta South (the primary site) which occupies the site of the historic Female Orphan School and Parramatta North (the secondary site) which includes the adjacent Western Sydney University Village Parramatta (formerly UWS Village Parramatta) an on campus student village accommodation. Whereby, the flagship Parramatta City Campus Precinct consists of two buildings: the Engineering Innovation Hub located at 6 Hassall Street and the Peter Shergold Building located at 1 Parramatta Square (169 Macquarie Street). Alphacrucis University College is a Christian liberal arts college with a campus in Parramatta located at 30 Cowper Street. The University of Sydney has also announced that it intends to establish a new campus in Parramatta.

== Media ==
The Parramatta Advertiser is the local newspaper serving Parramatta and surrounding suburbs.

On 16 March 2020, the Australian Broadcasting Corporation opened a new western Sydney newsroom in Horwood Place at Parramatta incorporating space for 12 staff and news production equipment with the capacity to broadcast live radio programs. According to the ABC, the opening formed part of its strategic goal to improve its presence in outer metropolitan areas. Additionally, the ABC announced on 16 June 2021 its intention to relocate approximately 300 employees to Parramatta, which is part of a five-year plan which aims to have 75% of its content makers based away from the network's Ultimo headquarters by 2025.

In 2024, the ABC set up a new studio in Parramatta Square with Mornings on ABC Radio Sydney being the first program to broadcast from the new location. In 2025, they moved bulletins on the ABC News channel to be broadcast from the new location with an official opening by the prime minister Anthony Albanese.

In 2025, The Sydney Morning Herald announced the establishment of a Parramatta bureau to provide enhanced coverage of the western Sydney area.

== Culture and sport ==
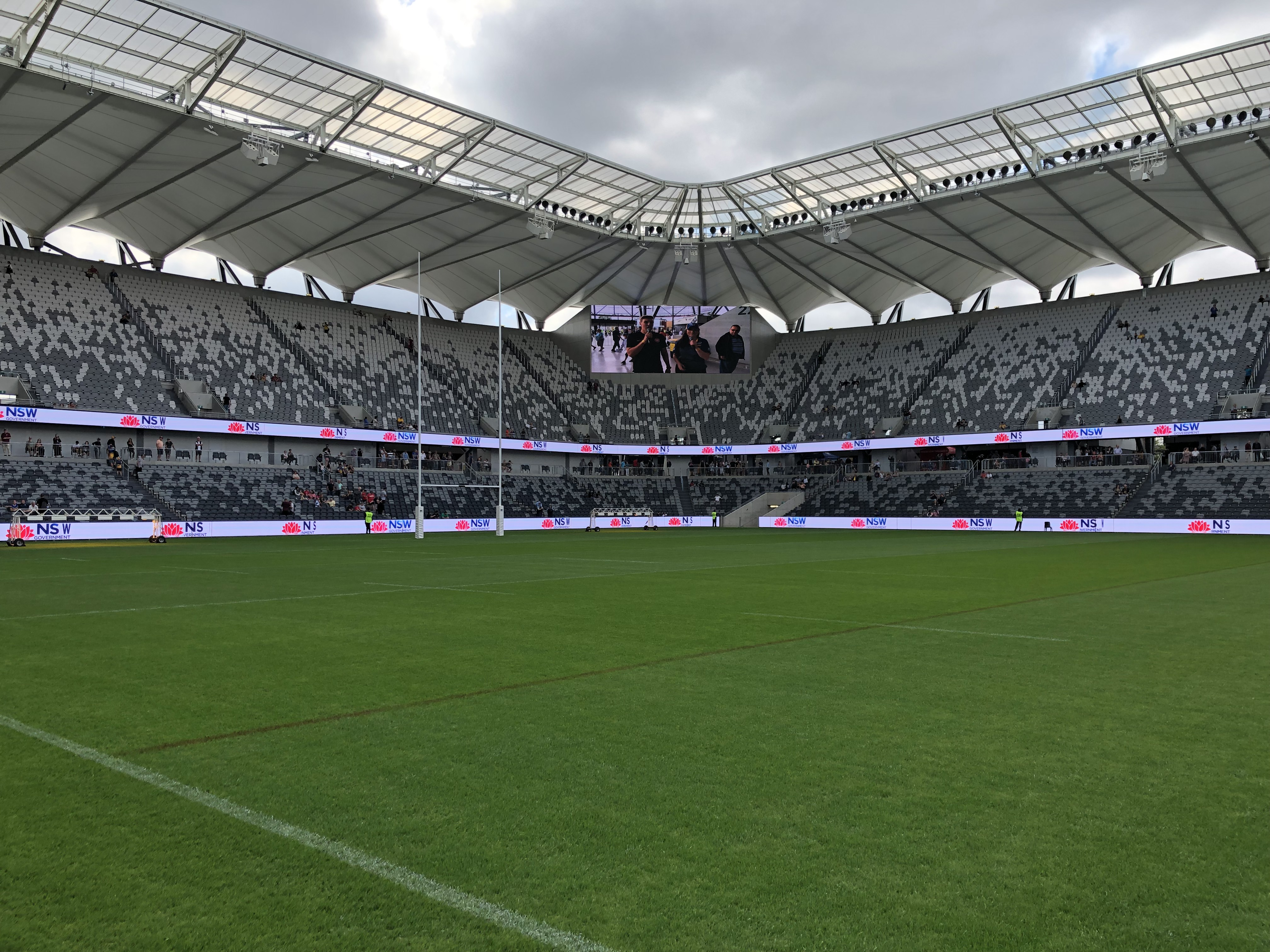
CommBank Stadium

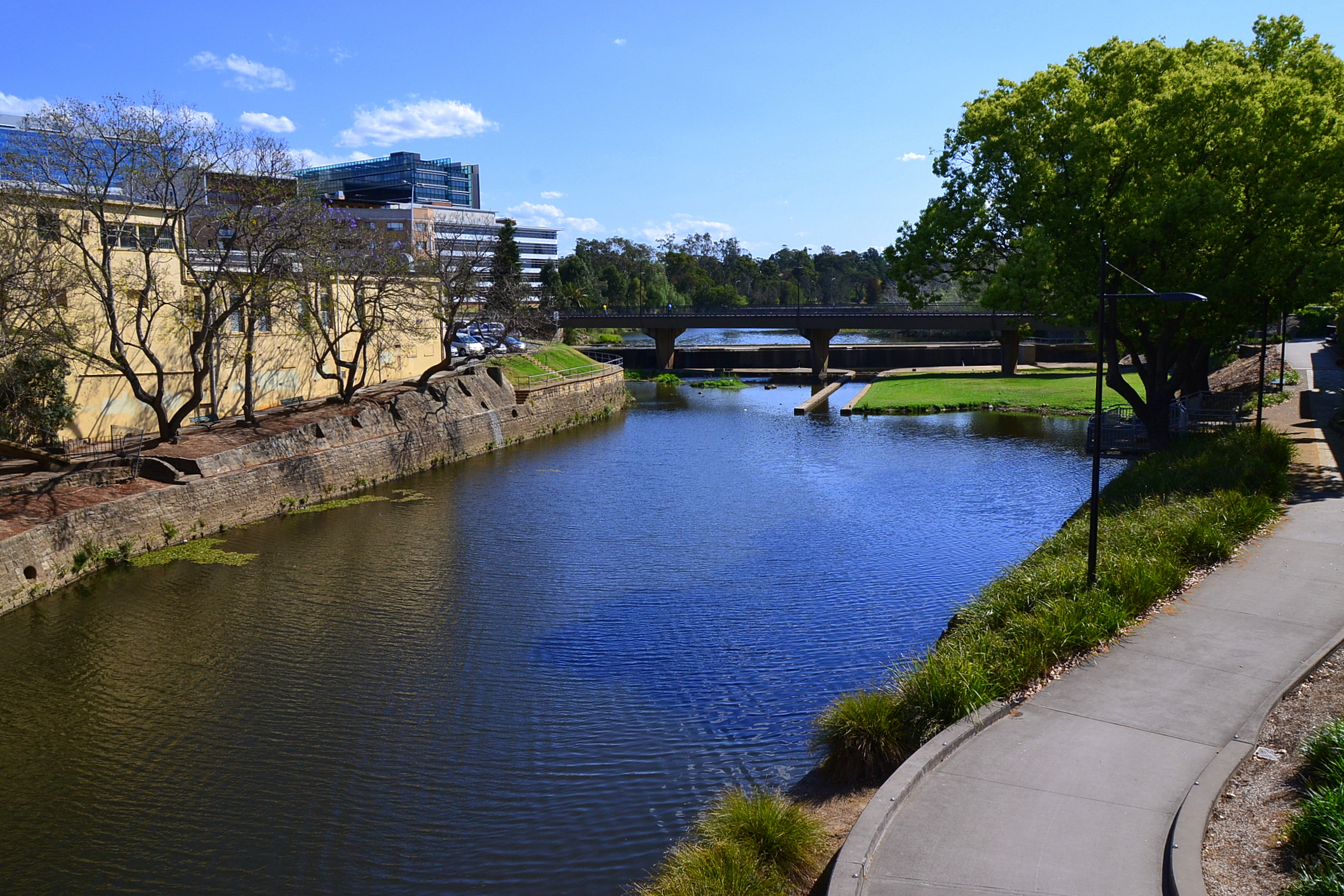
Various events are held on the Parramatta River.

As the centre of the City of Parramatta, as well as the centre and second largest business district of Sydney, Parramatta hosts many festivals and events. Riverside Theatres is a performing arts centre located on the northern bank of Parramatta River. The city hosts the following events:

- January – Sydney Festival and Australia Day
- February – Lunar New Year
- April – Anzac Day
- July – Winterlight and Burramatta Day (NAIDOC Week)
- October – Parramasala and Parramatta Lanes
- November – Loy Krathong, Christmas in Parramatta and Foundation Day
- December – New Year's Eve

Parramatta Park contains Old Government House and thus Parramatta was once the capital of the colony of New South Wales until governors returned to residing in Sydney in 1846. Another feature is the natural amphitheatre located on one of the bends of the river, named by Governor Philip as "the Crescent", which is used to stage concerts. It is home to the Dairy Cottage, built from 1798 to 1805, originally a single-room cottage and is one of the earliest surviving cottages in Australia.

The remains of governor Brisbane's private astronomical observatory, constructed in 1822, are visible. Astronomers who worked at the observatory, discovering thousands of new stars and deep sky objects, include James Dunlop and Carl Rümker. In 1822, the architect S. L. Harris designed the Bath House for Governor Brisbane and built it in 1823. Water was pumped to the building through lead pipes from the river. In 1886, it was converted into a pavilion.

=== Cultural events ===
- The Rosehill Race Course holds various race meets throughout the year, including: Derby Day, Golden Rose Day, and Rosehill Gardens Race Day.
- The Parramatta Farmers Markets occurs every Friday, and has local produce.

=== Sporting teams ===
Parramatta is the home of several professional sports teams. These teams include the Parramatta Eels of the National Rugby League and Western Sydney Wanderers of the A-League. Both teams formerly played matches at Parramatta Stadium that has since been demolished, and replaced with the 30,000-seat Western Sydney Stadium. Parramatta Stadium was also home to the now dissolved Sydney Wave of the former Australian Baseball League and Parramatta Power of the former National Soccer League. The newly built Bankwest Stadium opened its gates for the community on 14 April 2019 with free entry for all fans. Located on O'Connell Street, the stadium is in proximity of the Parramatta CBD.

== Entertainment ==
Duran Duran's "Union of the Snake" music video with Russell Mulcahy was filmed in 1983 at Parramatta using 35mm film.

The 2013 superhero film The Wolverine used the intersection of George Street and Smith Street as a filming location to depict Tokyo, Japan.

== Heritage listings ==
Parramatta has a number of heritage-listed sites, including:

- 1 and 3 Barrack Lane: Warders Cottages
- 39 Campbell Street: Lennox House
- 195 Church Street: St John's Cathedral
- 349–351 (adj) Church Street: Lennox Bridge
- 353 Church Street: Prince Alfred Square
- 541 Church Street: Oddfellows Arms Inn
- Fleet Street: Parramatta Female Factory and Institutions Precinct
- 10 George Street: Brislington
- 65–69 George Street: Roxy Theatre
- 85 George Street: Perth House
- 88–92 George Street: 88–92 George Street
- 182 George Street: Harrisford
- Great Western railway: Parramatta railway station
- Horwood Place: Redcoats Mess House
- Linden House, 2 Smith Street: New South Wales Lancers Memorial Museum Collection
- 1 Marist Place: Murphy House
- 45 Macquarie Street: Parramatta Archaeological Site
- Marsden Street: Parramatta Hospital Archaeological Site
- 8 Melville Street: Macarthur House
- O'Connell Street: Old King's School
- O'Connell Street: Old Government House
- 1 O'Connell Street: St John's Anglican Cemetery
- 12, 14, 16 O'Connell Street: Travellers Rest Inn
- 25 O'Connell Street: Avondale
- 40–42 O'Connell Street: Roseneath Cottage
- Corner O'Connell Street and Dunlop Street, North Parramatta: Parramatta Correctional Centre
- 54 Sorrell Street: Endrim
- 43a Thomas Street: Broughton House

== See also ==
- List of tallest buildings in Parramatta
- Parramatta cloth – Tweed cloth of the early 1800s from Parramatta, Australia
- Story Factory – Australian not-for-profit organisation
