= Redcoats Mess House =

- Location within Sydney Location within Australia
- 33°48′49″S 151°00′19″E
- Location: 2 Horwood Place, Parramatta, City of Parramatta, New South Wales, Australia

History
- Built: c. 1930s

New South Wales Heritage Register
- Official name: Redcoats Mess House
- Type: State heritage (complex / group)
- Designated: 2 April 1999
- Reference no.: 218
- Type: Staff Accommodation
- Category: Law Enforcement

Redcoats Mess House is a heritage-listed former military mess and now commercial building at 2 Horwood Place, Parramatta, City of Parramatta, New South Wales, Australia. It was added to the New South Wales State Heritage Register on 2 April 1999.

== History ==
The Redcoats Mess House was built in the mid-1830s as a mess hall and catering establishment for military officers stationed in the Parramatta district. It is now used for commercial purposes.

== Description ==
The Redcoats Mess House is a two-storey gabled building with a rectangular plan running north–south. It has painted Flemish bond brickwork with iron roof. The southern portion is slightly higher than the rest of the building. It has small paned sash windows.

== Heritage listing ==
Evidence of the major role of colonial and state government in Parramatta. Site possesses potential to contribute to an understanding early urban development in Parramatta.

Redcoats Mess House was listed on the New South Wales State Heritage Register on 2 April 1999 having satisfied the following criteria.

The place is important in demonstrating the course, or pattern, of cultural or natural history in New South Wales.

This item historically significant.

The place has potential to yield information that will contribute to an understanding of the cultural or natural history of New South Wales.

This item is technically or scientifically significant.
