= Warders Cottages, Parramatta =

Warders Cottages
- Location within Sydney Location within Australia
- 33.8151°S 151.0071°E
- Location: 1 and 3 Barrack Lane, Parramatta, City of Parramatta, Sydney, New South Wales, Australia

New South Wales Heritage Register
- Official name: Warders Cottages
- Type: state heritage (built)
- Designated: 2 April 1999
- Reference no.: 709
- Type: Cottage
- Category: Residential buildings (private)

The Warders Cottages are adjoining heritage-listed cottages at 1 and 3 Barrack Lane, Parramatta, City of Parramatta, Sydney, New South Wales, Australia. They were added to the New South Wales State Heritage Register on 2 April 1999.

== History ==
The cottages were constructed between 1842 and 1844. It has been suggested that they were built as working class housing, as a speculative venture by merchant John Solomon. A renovation during the mid-twentieth century nearly doubled the available space in the cottages. They were classified by the National Trust of Australia in 1975. The cottages were abandoned during the 1980s, but were subsequently fully renovated as commercial premises.

Although the site is generally known as the Warders Cottages, it was not built along with the adjoining convict-era barracks and lumber yard. It has been suggested that the association with the adjacent barracks was "a product of the twentieth century" for which there was no evidence.

A three-storey office building was built closely adjoining the cottages in the late 1980s, which proceeded although the Heritage Council had found that it would have a material effect on the site.

== Heritage listing ==
The Warders Cottages were first granted protection from demolition on heritage grounds in 1979, were made subject to an interim conservation order in 1986 and a permanent conservation order in 1989. They were listed on the New South Wales State Heritage Register on 2 April 1999.

== See also ==
- Australian residential architectural styles
