= 88–92 George Street, Parramatta =

88–92 George Street
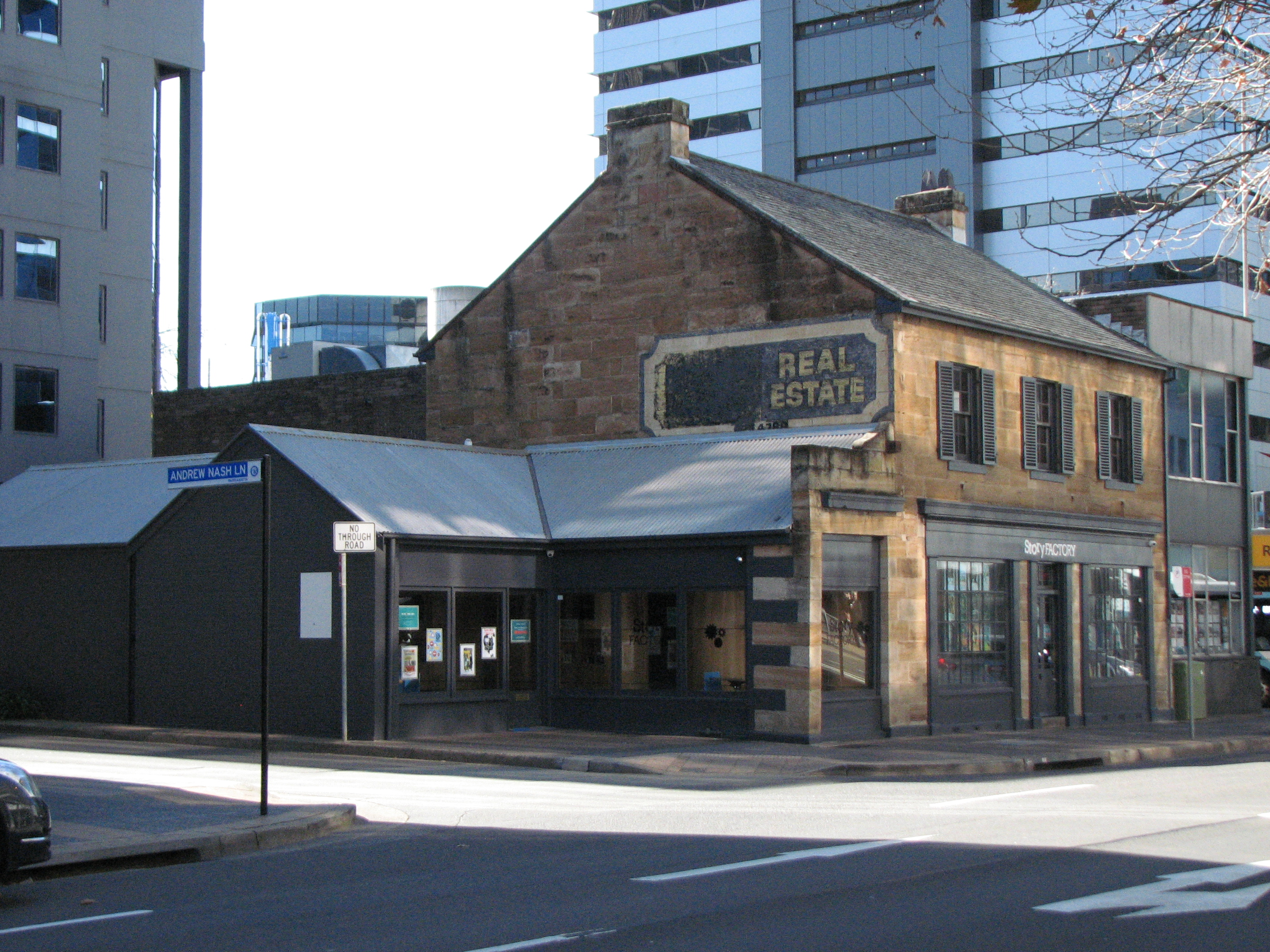
- 88–92 George Street, Parramatta, New South Wales

- Location within Sydney Location within Australia
- 33°48′50″S 151°00′22″E
- Location: 88–92 George Street, Parramatta, City of Parramatta, New South Wales, Australia

History
- Built: 1835–1840

New South Wales Heritage Register
- Official name: Shop and office; Townhouse; de Brole Plater Confectionary Shop
- Type: State heritage (built)
- Designated: 2 April 1999
- Reference no.: 278
- Type: Shop
- Category: Retail and Wholesale

88–92 George Street is a heritage-listed former shop and residence and now commercial premises in Parramatta, a city within the Greater Sydney metropolitan area in New South Wales, Australia. It was built from 1835 to 1840. It is also known as de Brole Plater Confectionery Shop. It was added to the New South Wales State Heritage Register on 2 April 1999.

== History ==
Occupied during 1840s and 1850s by Count Lucien de Broel Plater; later a confectionery shop conducted by the Count's family.

Following notification under section 132 of the Heritage Act to partially demolish the building an Interim Heritage Order was placed over the site on 18 December 1981.

A Permanent Conservation Order was placed over the site on 2 December 1983.

On 14 October 1982 Heritage Council approved an application to renovate/restore the building.

It was transferred to the State Heritage Register on 2 April 1999.

The building has been expertly restored with fine joinery to the shopfronts and period interiors and signage. Sympathetically designed extensions have been added at the side and rear of the early building.

In 2018, 88 George Street was leased to the Story Factory as new Western Sydney premises and although planning issues delayed their intended refurbishment and opening, the new workshop area opened on 20 October 2018.

== Description ==
This shop building was built as a house in the late 1830s. It is a simple two-storey Georgian style building constructed in stone with a slate roof and was originally one of a pair of townhouses. Simple twelve light windows remain on the upper level. Ground floor windows have been substantially altered and a door has been added.

The rear service yard (car park now) contains a rare young (perhaps 20 years old) tree, a dragon or dragon's blood tree (Dracaena draco) from the Canary Islands. This, while seen in colonial gardens and botanic gardens, is rarely seen in private gardens.

== Heritage listing ==
An example of stone buildings that characterised the townscape of nineteenth century Parramatta, and are now rare. Site possesses potential to contribute to an understanding early urban development in Parramatta.

88–92 George Street was listed on the New South Wales State Heritage Register on 2 April 1999 having satisfied the following criteria.

The place is important in demonstrating the course, or pattern, of cultural or natural history in New South Wales.

This item historically significant.

The place possesses uncommon, rare or endangered aspects of the cultural or natural history of New South Wales.

This item is rare.
