= Oddfellows Arms Inn =

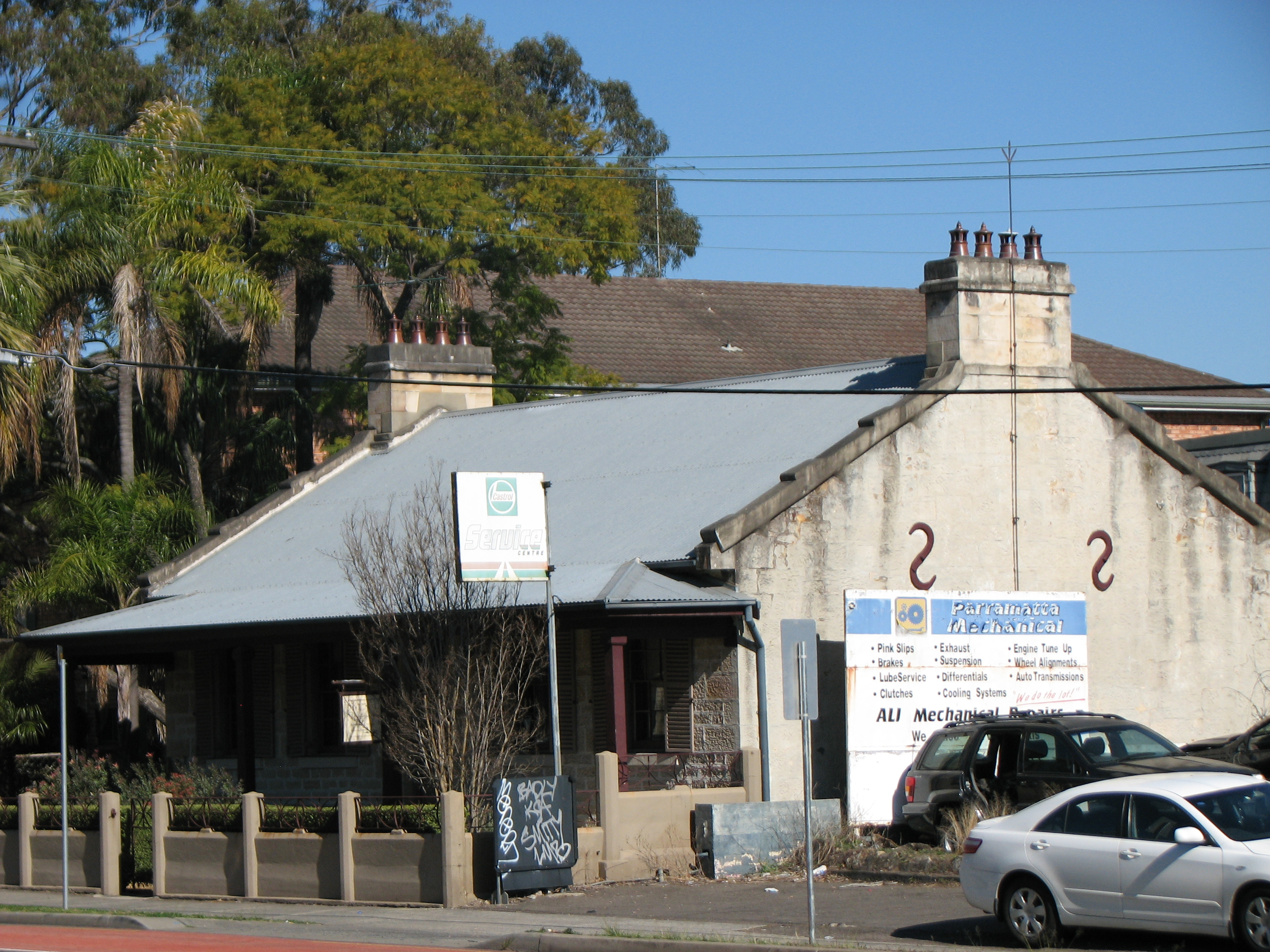
- Oddfellows Arms Inn, 541 Church Street, Parramatta, New South Wales

- Location within Sydney Location within Australia
- 33.7994°S 151.0032°E
- Location: 541 Church Street, Parramatta, Sydney, New South Wales, Australia

History
- Built: 1842

Site notes
- Owner: Savage Superannuation Fund

New South Wales Heritage Register
- Official name: Oddfellows Arms Inn; Fairview House
- Type: state heritage (built)
- Designated: 2 April 1999
- Reference no.: 276
- Type: Inn/Tavern
- Category: Commercial
- Builders: unknown

Oddfellows Arms Inn is a heritage-listed former residence, inn and boarding house at 541 Church Street, Parramatta, Sydney, New South Wales, Australia. It was built from 1842. It is also known as Fairview House. It was added to the New South Wales State Heritage Register on 2 April 1999.

== History ==
Parramatta was the first European settlement outside Sydney and was established in 1788. Initially known as the Crescent settlement, Parramatta was originally laid out as the town of Rose Hill in 1790. Called Parramatta when Governor Phillip used a corruption of an Aboriginal name on the second of June 1791. Formed primarily to disperse the colonies inadequate food procedure by cultivating forms in the surrounding district it became known as an agricultural town by 1789. Of these, the convict operated farm that covered the areas of Parramatta and Toongabbie was the most prominent, with free grant holders circling outward.

Settlement clusters included Prospect to the West, the Ponds to the North East, and the Northern Boundary. The Northern Boundary was considered closer to civilization due to its proximity to the town of Parramatta, and was proclaimed a district in 1802. Church Street linked the Northern District to the town via a bridge. Governor Macquarie restructured the town in 1810 by adding new streets and realigning the old. The road to Windsor made the use of Church Street more frequent as it became the land route to Windsor Road, replacing George Stre]] as the major through fare of the district.

Governor Macquarie, in a bid to improve the tone of Parramatta, offered to convert leases into a grants for any blocks with substantial brick or stone buildings worth a thousand pounds or more. Town leases were made available from the 1790s, but most were with verbal permission. Although it is north of the river, the site of the Odd Fellow Arms is within the town boundaries marked by the Macquarie tollgates. West of Windsor road and away from the town's centre, its position suggests that it was one of the inferior allotments permitted to the lower classes. The urban land north of the river was rendered more desirable in the late 1820s by the scarcity of more central allotments.

A part of the later stage of this Northern development, the Odd Fellows Arms was built on one of the land releases issued after 1823. The land was a town lease to Patrick Darcy, promised by Governor Brisbane and confirmed by Darling. Possession changed several times over the next few years until James MacRoberts purchased the property, although without any proof of purchase a chain of possession had to be established in the court of claims. Having settled this, MacRoberts was issued with the deed on 27 July 1842 for Allotment 44 in Section 26 of Parramatta, his land was bounded on the South East by a Samuel Hills allotment. MacRoberts received his first publican's license on 31 March 1843; the address on the license was given as Church Street Parramatta. MacRoberts' link to the Odd Fellows cannot be established and no reason for his choice of name can be determined. Despite being an isolated part of town, the Odd Fellows Arms would have profited from Parramatta Gaol built a block away and there would have been regular passing trade from the orchards to the markets in town, as well as those passing northwards through Parramatta - all of which would have allowed the Inn to survive in its isolated location.

Even in 1841, where more than half of the buildings were made of timber, the Odd Fellows Arms was of superior quality, constructed of stone and well finished, it seems to have been purpose built as an inn. With a cottage like exterior, the Odd Fellows Arms was more elegant than many of the competing pubs outside of Parramatta, and was close enough to the river for patrons to catch a steamer to Sydney. Official records of the Inn's license do not place exactly when it went out of business, but it was still going in 1851 when the gold rush to Bathurst boosted Parramatta's economy, but it probably closed around 1855 when the railway was built in the opposite end of town, stimulating development and leading traffic away from the Odd Fellows Arms.

MacRoberts eventually went bankrupt in 1860 and sold the Inn to a Benjamin Lee. At some stage in its history the Inn was renamed the Fruit Growers Hotel, as indicated by faded signs on the building, although it is not clear when this occurred. Lee senior and junior leased the building until 1879 when it was put up for auction, with no mention of being a hotel. The auction does not seem to have gone through as the property was sold from Lee's estate in 1884 to surgeon William Poulton Lee as a residence. The land had previously been subdivided, but Lee's purchase brought the parcels back together and he renamed the property Fairview House.

Fairview House achieved the status of a gentleman's villa surrounded by residences and businesses. On William Lee's death the property passed into the hands of Benjamin Lee, who leased it to Harriet Atkins. Atkins operated a boarding house until 1907 when it was sold to florist Johannes Christian Johannsen and renamed Johannsen Court. For the remaining years the property acquired different owners and was largely used as a private residency, or rented out to tenants.

== Description ==
The Odd Fellows Arms Inn is a two-storey Victorian Georgian sandstone structure facing directly onto Church Street Parramatta. From the front the Odd Fellows Arms Inn presents to be of single storey appearance with a lower ground level accessible from the rear.

The eastern front yard measures 4.50 by 18 metres (15 by 59 ft) in area, and its eastern boundary is defined by the old front wall of the former hotel. The front area also consists of garden beds and a verandah with two steps that runs parallel with the front wall of the building. The front wall of the building consists of dressed sandstone blocks bonded with shell lime and cement mortar, which suggests it is the original wall while the verandah and steps suggest they were built during the first half of the twentieth century. The sandstone walls are in generally good condition, although the lower western (rear) walls have experienced some deterioration.

The roof of terracotta tiles with matching chimney pots are a recent modification. The roof line has been altered at the rear with the addition of unsympathetic dormer windows. The front verandah of the building is made of concrete columns.

The interior of the building consists of two stories and an attic area. Most of the rooms found within the Odd Fellows Arms experienced various alterations of varying degrees over the approximate one hundred and fifty years of its life span, with the attic and ground floor surviving with next to no alteration. No significant alteration to the building has been undertaken from its construction, its configuration and character of the original building is still evident.

== Heritage listing ==
The building originally known as the "Odd Fellows Arms", 541 Church Street, Parramatta, is a rare example of a mid-nineteenth century inn and dwelling. Its State significance lies in the condition and integrity of the Inn. The study of this building and its grounds contribute to an understanding or early urban development in Parramatta. The changing uses of the building demonstrates the commercial role Parramatta in the nineteenth century. This building and its historical functions demonstrate the early network that linked Sydney with the rural outposts, such as Windsor and Toongabbie.

Oddfellows Arms Inn was listed on the New South Wales State Heritage Register on 2 April 1999 having satisfied the following criteria.

The place is important in demonstrating the course, or pattern, of cultural or natural history in New South Wales.

The Odd Fellows Inn is of State significance as a reflection of the function of Parramatta as a major regional centre as well as being part of the pattern of development along Church Street beyond the town centre.

The place possesses uncommon, rare or endangered aspects of the cultural or natural history of New South Wales.

The Odd Fellows Inn is of State significance as a rare pre-1850s commercial building, particularly given its condition and integrity.

The place is important in demonstrating the principal characteristics of a class of cultural or natural places/environments in New South Wales.

The Odd Fellows Inn is of State significance for the buildings integrity and condition. Apart from some minor alterations the original proportions and openings have been retained.
