= Perth House =

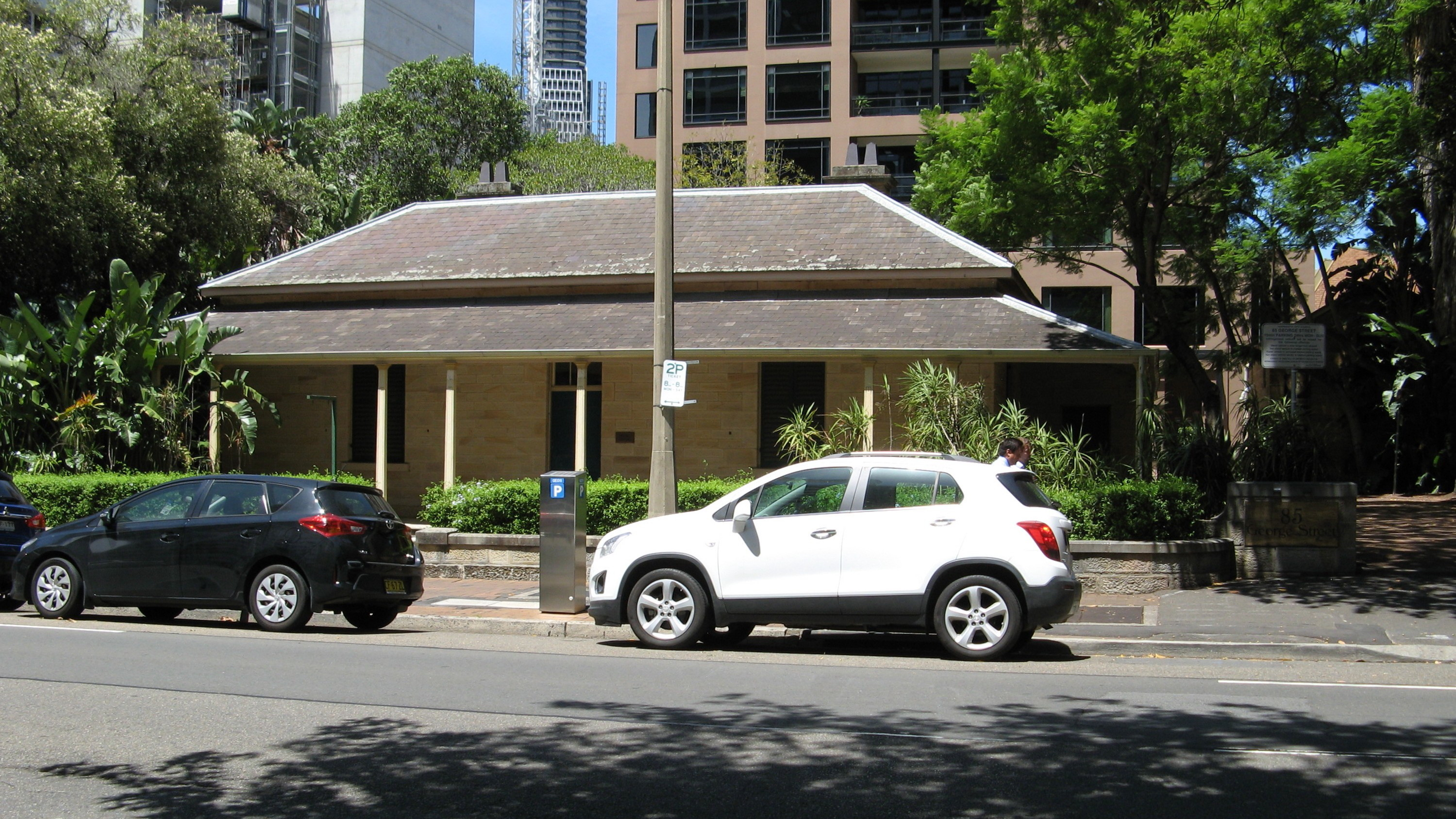

- Location within Sydney Location within Australia
- 33.8150°S 151.0077°E
- Location: 85 George Street, Parramatta, Sydney, New South Wales, Australia

History
- Built: 1841

Site notes
- Architect: James Houison

New South Wales Heritage Register
- Official name: Perth House and Stables
- Type: state heritage (complex / group)
- Designated: 2 April 1999
- Reference no.: 155
- Type: House
- Category: Residential buildings (private)
- Builders: James Houison

Perth House is a heritage-listed former residence and school for girls at 85 George Street, Parramatta, Sydney, New South Wales, Australia. It was designed by James Houison and built in 1841. It was added to the New South Wales State Heritage Register on 2 April 1999.

== History ==
Perth House, stables and carriageway were built in 1841 by James Houison for George Oakes, a landholder of the Parramatta district and member of the Parliament of New South Wales. The architect of the house was James Houison, who designed many houses in Parramatta. The original cottage garden around the house, stables and carriage way was likely to have been planted between 1844 and 1846, including the Moreton Bay fig (Ficus macrophylla) which survives today.

A photo in 1880 shows Perth House was used as a girls' school at that time.

The building was for sale in September 2016, advertised as being suitable for uses including hospitality, professional services and childcare.

== Description ==
Perth House is a single-storey Colonial/Victorian Georgian residence with a hipped roof to a central block with encircling verandahs. Constructed of coursed and dressed sandstone blocks with quoins 2 courses deep. The spacing of the Doric moulded square timber verandah pots is unusual. The verandah is paved with stone. Small paned sash windows and a 6 panelled door with fanlight. Generous grounds and plantings. Cedar joinery. Two storied stone out-building at the rear. Archaeological Site: AZP Cross Reference: PC 71

To the west of the house and north of the stables near the footpath on George Street is a large mature Moreton Bay fig (Ficus macrophylla), thought to date from c. 1844-6, in the time of Oakes. This tree is most probably a remnant of the original cottage garden of Perth House.

West of the house is the carriageway, leading to the stone out-building (former stables) behind (south of) the house.

The property was in good physical condition as at 27 October 2006.

== Heritage listing ==
Perth House and Stables is of State significance as it demonstrates c. 1850 aspirations with regard to taste and lifestyle on a domestic level. It demonstrates a high degree of creative excellence and is a fine example of medium sized domestic architecture. It has strong associations with important figures such as George Oakes and James Houison.

Perth House and Stables was listed on the New South Wales State Heritage Register on 2 April 1999 having satisfied the following criteria.

The place is important in demonstrating the course, or pattern, of cultural or natural history in New South Wales.

Perth House and Stables reflects the changing circumstance of Parramatta through the gradual attrition of the land holding. The relatively small accommodation of the house caused its occasional enlargement to the south, firstly by enclosure of the south west verandah area. Division into flats and offices in the 20th century reflected the increasing commercialisation of central Parramatta, with key residential areas on its fringe.

The place has a strong or special association with a person, or group of persons, of importance of cultural or natural history of New South Wales's history.

Perth House was apparently built for pastoralist George Oakes, son of a former missionary, who became first Member of the Legislative Assembly for Parramatta as well as a lengthy involvement in local municipal politics. Perth House is also associated with James Houison, who arrived in the colony as a steerage passenger, quickly established himself as an astute builder and urban land speculator and later became known as an architect/builder of recognised talent as well as an important figure in municipal politics.

The site has further significance due to its association with the Superintendent of Government Buildings at Parramatta who resided on the site - adjacent to the lumber yard - at an earlier date.

The place is important in demonstrating aesthetic characteristics and/or a high degree of creative or technical achievement in New South Wales.

This item is aesthetically significant.

The place has potential to yield information that will contribute to an understanding of the cultural or natural history of New South Wales.

This item is technically or scientifically significant.

The place possesses uncommon, rare or endangered aspects of the cultural or natural history of New South Wales.

Perth House and Stables has a considerable degree of unity in its materials, form and scale and is a rare reminder of the harmonious and generally low scale architectural character once in Parramatta.

The place is important in demonstrating the principal characteristics of a class of cultural or natural places/environments in New South Wales.

Perth House and Stables is an important and typical example of a c. 1850 house designed by the fashionable Parramatta architect of the day, James Houison.

== See also ==
- Australian residential architectural styles
