= Juvenile court =

Court to try minors for legal offenses

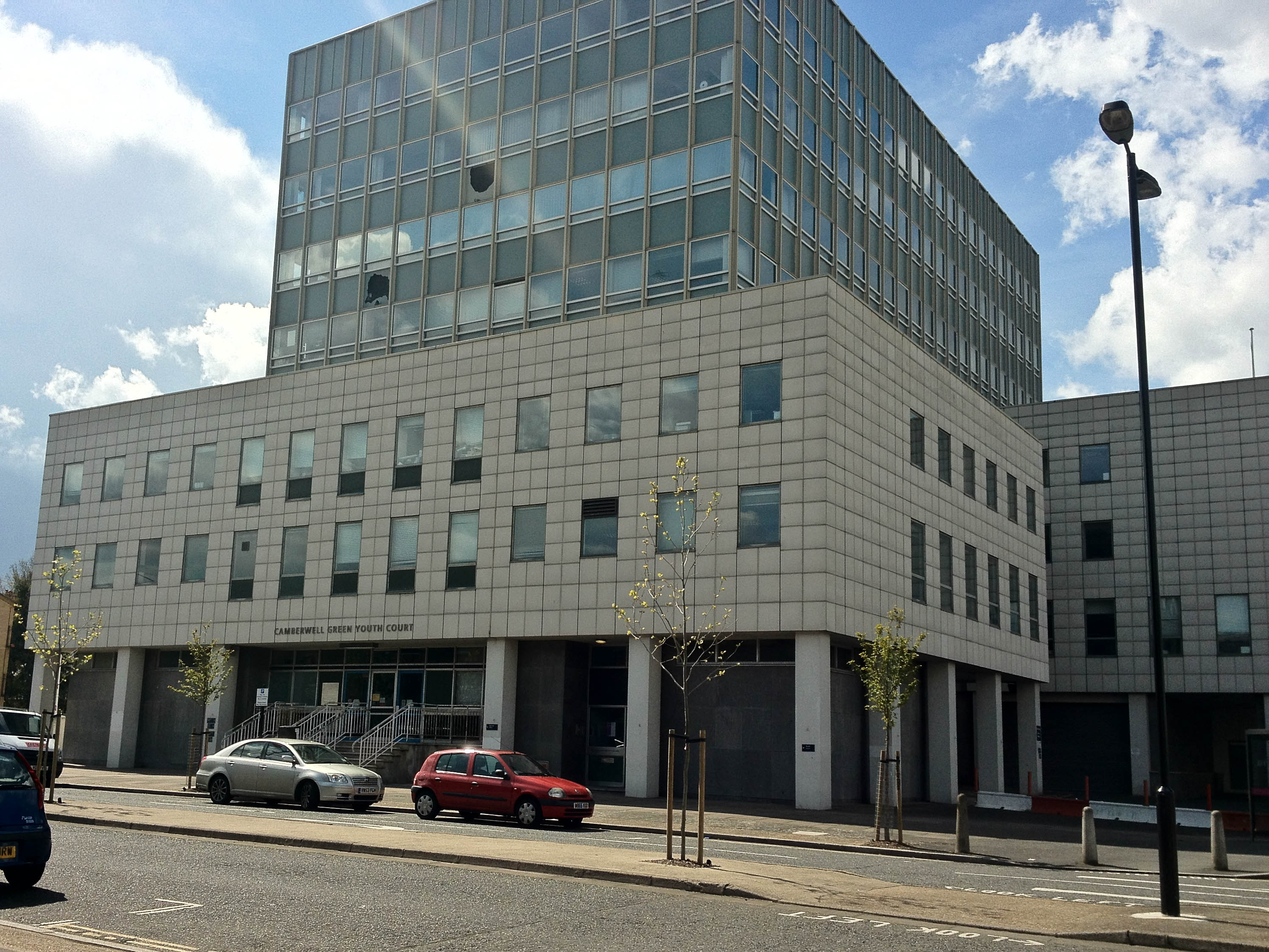
Youth Court Building in Camberwell

Juvenile court, also known as young offender's court or children's court, is a tribunal having special authority to pass judgements for crimes committed by children who have not attained the age of majority. In most modern legal systems, children who commit a crime are treated differently from legal adults who have committed the same offense. Juveniles have a lack of capacity for understanding their criminal acts, meaning they also have diminished criminal responsibility compared to their adult counterparts. In some states like California and Georgia, juvenile courts also have jurisdiction over dependency proceedings which involve determining whether a child has been abused or neglected by their parent or legal guardian and needs state intervention to protect them from further harm.

Industrialized countries differ in whether juveniles should be charged as adults for serious crimes or considered separately. Since the 1970s, minors have been increasingly tried as adults in response to "increases in violent juvenile crime". Young offenders may still not be charged as adults. Serious offenses, such as murder or rape, can be prosecuted through adult court in England. However, as of 2007, no United States data reported any exact numbers of juvenile offenders prosecuted as adults. In contrast, countries such as Australia and Japan are in the early stages of developing and implementing youth-focused justice initiatives positive youth justice as a deferment from adult court.

Globally, the United Nations has encouraged nations to reform their systems to fit with a model in which "entire society [must] ensure the harmonious development of adolescence" despite the delinquent behavior that may be causing issues. The hope was to create a more "child-friendly justice". Despite all the changes made by the United Nations, the rules in practice are less clear cut. Changes in a broad context cause issues of implementation locally, and international crimes committed by youth are causing additional questions regarding the benefit of separate proceedings for juveniles.

Issues of juvenile justice have gained global prominence in various cultural contexts. As globalization has progressed in recent centuries, questions about justice, particularly concerning the protection of children's rights within juvenile courts, have come to the forefront. Global policies on this matter have garnered wider acceptance, and there has been a general cultural shift towards treating child offenders in accordance with this trend.

== Models ==
Juvenile court, a specialized division within the judicial system, is tasked with adjudicating cases involving underage defendants who face charges ranging from criminal offenses to neglect, or are deemed to be beyond parental control. Typically, these defendants are under the age of 18, although the legal threshold for adulthood varies by jurisdiction.

Juvenile court operates distinctively from adult courts, lacking jurisdiction over cases where minors face charges as adults. While the proceedings within juvenile court may not always adhere to an adversarial format, minors are afforded the right to legal representation by counsel. Additionally, parental figures, social workers, and probation officers may play integral roles in the proceedings, aiming to achieve positive outcomes and prevent recidivism.

However, in cases involving serious or repeated offenses, juvenile offenders may face incarceration, potentially leading to transfer to a state correctional facility upon reaching legal adulthood. In situations where parental neglect or inability to control the minor is evident, the court may explore placement in foster care, assuming guardianship over the child.

Juvenile court is multifaceted, addressing both delinquency—pertaining to criminal acts committed by minors—and dependency, encompassing scenarios where non-parental guardianship is required for the minor's welfare.

=== Restorative justice model ===
In the realm of juvenile justice, two predominant models are typically considered: restorative justice and criminal justice. In the United States, there is an observable shift towards embracing a more restorative approach, particularly concerning juvenile offenders. Canada has long embraced a restorative model and continues to enhance its practices aimed at integrating youthful offenders into society, with a focus on preventing recidivism and fostering their positive contribution to communities. Similarly, Austria has launched initiatives to implement victim-offender mediation programs, geared towards a restorative form of justice. New Zealand has undergone significant systemic restructuring, drawing from the long-standing practices of its indigenous Māori population. Their approach emphasizes family-centric solutions aimed at reducing youth incarceration rates. Globally, there is a growing trend of leveraging traditional values to positively influence juvenile court systems.

== International human rights tribunals ==
In the realm of international law, the prosecution of children for crimes against the state stands as a contentious and multifaceted issue, particularly concerning child soldiers. A proposed remedy to this complex dilemma involves the establishment of specialized juvenile courts aimed at adjudicating cases involving minors accused of international crimes. Notably, in regions like Sierra Leone, there exists a strong societal demand for holding perpetrators fully accountable, regardless of their age or social circumstances.

When juveniles are referred to these specialized courts, they receive treatment imbued with a heightened sense of respect, alongside a concerted effort towards rehabilitation and reintegration, acknowledging the early age at which many child soldiers are coerced into conflict. The Secretary General has characterized the utilization of such tribunals as presenting a "moral dilemma".

Child soldiers often find themselves embroiled in armed conflict due to pervasive structural or systemic threats in their environments. Nevertheless, they bear responsibility for perpetrating numerous violent and egregious acts. This dual role as both victims of oppressive regimes and perpetrators of atrocities presents a formidable challenge that the United Nations has endeavored to address, not only within Sierra Leone but also in other afflicted nations globally.

== United States ==
Although the rules governing juvenile court vary significantly from state to state, the broad goal of U.S. juvenile courts is to provide a remedial or rehabilitative alternative to the adult criminal justice system. Although not always met, the ideal is to put a juvenile offender on the correct path to be a law-abiding adult. The first juvenile court case in the United States took place in Illinois on July 3, 1899, when Judge Richard S. Tuthill presided over a case in which a mother accused her eleven-year-old son of larceny; his determination was that the child should be sent to live with a grandmother rather than be committed to a penal institution.

=== Jurisdiction ===
Rules for jurisdiction of a juvenile court depend upon the state. In most states, juvenile court jurisdiction continues through the age of eighteen, but in some states it may end at age seventeen or younger. Some states, such as Arizona, have recently adopted extended jurisdiction policies, where jurisdiction remains under the authority of the presiding juvenile court system through the adjudicated delinquent juvenile's nineteenth year of age. At times, a juvenile offender who is initially charged in juvenile court will be waived to adult court, meaning that the offender may be tried and sentenced in the same manner as an adult. "Once an adult, always an adult" provisions state that juveniles who are convicted of a crime in adult court will thereafter always be tried in adult court, regardless of the seriousness of the offense.

==== Age of responsibility ====
There is no uniform national age from which a child is accountable in the juvenile court system; this varies between states.

- In 44 states, the maximum age for juvenile court jurisdiction is age seventeen
- In five states (Georgia, Michigan, Missouri, Texas and Wisconsin) the maximum age for juvenile court jurisdiction is age sixteen
- One state, North Carolina, has a maximum age for juvenile court jurisdiction of age fifteen

States vary in relation to the age at which a child may be subject to juvenile court proceedings for delinquent behavior. Most states do not specify a minimum age as a matter of law. Of states that set a minimum age, for status offenses:

- Massachusetts and North Carolina set a minimum age of six
- Connecticut and Mississippi set a minimum age of seven
- Arizona sets a minimum age of eight.

And for delinquency:

- North Carolina sets a minimum age of six.
- Connecticut, New York, and Maryland set a minimum age of seven
- Arkansas, Colorado, Kansas, Louisiana, Pennsylvania, South Dakota, Texas, Vermont and Wisconsin set a minimum age of ten
- California sets a minimum age of 12 except for murder or rape, which for there is no minimum age

==== Waiver to adult court ====
All states have laws that allow, and at times require, young offenders to be prosecuted or sentenced as adults for more serious offenses.

In Kent v. United States (1966), the United States Supreme Court held that a juvenile must be afforded due process rights, specifically that a waiver of jurisdiction from a juvenile court to a district court must be voluntary and knowing. The U.S. Supreme Court held, in the case of In re Gault (1967), that children accused in a juvenile delinquency proceeding have the rights to due process, counsel, and against self-incrimination, essentially the Miranda rights. Writing for the majority, Associate Justice Abe Fortas wrote, "Under our Constitution, the condition of being a boy does not justify a kangaroo court." However, most juvenile proceedings are held without a jury as McKeiver v. Pennsylvania (1971) decided that minors do not have the same rights in this regard as adults.

==== Other cases ====
In some jurisdictions, in addition to delinquent cases, juvenile court hears cases involving child custody, child support, and visitation as well as cases where children are alleged to be abused or neglected.

=== Court procedure ===
Procedures in juvenile court, for juveniles charged with delinquent acts (acts that would be crimes if committed by adults) or status offenses (offenses that can only be committed by minors, such as running away from home, curfew violations and truancy) are typically less formal than proceedings in adult courts. Proceedings may be closed to the public, and a juvenile offender's name may be kept out of the public record.

==== Avoiding formal charges ====
In an American juvenile court, it is possible to avoid placing formal charges. Factors that may affect a court's treatment of a juvenile offender and the disposition of the case include:

1. The severity of the offense. A serious crime is more likely to result in the filing of a petition than a less severe crime.
2. The minor's age. Petitions are more likely to be filed in cases involving older children.
3. The minor's past record. Formal charges are more likely when a minor has been previously involved with juvenile court.
4. The strength of the evidence that the minor committed a crime. Stronger evidence leads to a greater likelihood of formal charges.
5. The minor's sex. Formal charges are more likely to be filed against boys than against girls.
6. The minor's social history. Petitions are more likely to be filed when children have a history of problems at home or school.
7. The parent's or guardian's apparent ability to control the minor. The greater the lack of parental control, the more likely the intake officer is to file a petition.

Along with these seven, four "unofficial" factors can sway an official:

1. The minor's attitude. Formal proceedings are less likely to occur when a child shows remorse for committing a crime.
2. The minor's appearance. If the young person is polite, dressed well, and neatly groomed, then the intake personnel are more likely to handle the case informally.
3. Whether the minor has family or community support. The more support the young person has, the more likely the intake officer is to deal with the case informally.
4. Whether the minor has an attorney. Disposing of a case informally may be less likely when a child has a lawyer.

In Connecticut, a referral can be made to a non-court associated committee referred to as a Juvenile Review Board (JRB). These committees can present a resolution that does not result in a juvenile criminal record. However, there are qualifying circumstances for a case to be accepted for review, such as the type of offense (often must be minor in nature) and prior court involvement (many JRBs only accept first-time offenses).

==== Sentencing ====
Juvenile court sentences may range from:

- informal supervision, through which a court informally monitors a minor and dismisses a pending charge if the minor stays out of trouble
- formal supervision, similar to adult probation, under which a juvenile meets with and is supervised by a juvenile probation officer
- incarceration, usually in a juvenile detention facility

==== Mandatory minimum sentencing ====
Mandatory minimum sentences found their way into the juvenile justice system in the late 1970s out of concern that some juveniles were committing very serious criminal offenses. Mandatory minimum sentences might be imposed in juvenile court for some very serious crimes, such as homicide, and apply to juveniles in the same manner as adults if the juvenile is waived to adult court. The U.S. Supreme Court has ruled that the use of mandatory life sentences without the possibility of parole for juvenile offenders is unconstitutional.

== China ==
As part of China's ongoing legal reforms aimed at aiding juvenile offenders in reintegrating into society more effectively and swiftly, juvenile courts have been established with an emphasis on education. A distinctive feature of these juvenile courts is that trials often take the form of roundtable meetings, reducing the number of irrelevant personnel involved in the proceedings. This aims to alleviate the psychological burden of guilt on juvenile offenders and facilitate their smoother and quicker reintegration into society.

=== Jurisdiction ===
Within the 23 provinces of China, except for cases involving homicide, offenses committed by individuals under the age of 16, or children (if there are no individuals over the age of 16 charged in the case), are adjudicated by juvenile courts. Juvenile courts also have the authority to issue supervision and protection orders for individuals aged 18 or younger.

As of the end of 2022, a total of 2,181 juvenile courts have been established nationwide.

==== Courts Establishment ====
The intermediate people's courts and grassroots people's courts in China may establish juvenile criminal trial divisions.

In areas where the conditions are not yet in place, juvenile criminal cases may be heard by a collegial panel within the criminal trial divisions or handled by designated personnel.

The higher people's courts may establish collegial panels for juvenile criminal cases within the criminal trial divisions.

==== Jurisdiction ====
1. Cases where the defendant was under the age of 18 at the time of the alleged crime and under the age of 20 at the time of filing;
2. Cases where the defendant was under the age of 18 at the time of the alleged crime, under the age of 20 at the time of filing, and charged as the principal offender or co-principal in a joint crime;
3. Whether other joint crime cases involving juvenile defendants or other criminal cases involving minors are to be tried by juvenile courts shall be determined by the President of the People's Court based on the actual situation of juvenile court work.
4. Cases of crimes committed by students who were under the age of twenty-two at the time of filing.

== Reform ==
In his 1997 book No Matter How Loud I Shout, which delves into the Los Angeles Juvenile Courts, Edward Humes made a case for radical reform within juvenile court systems. He contended that the current system often fails to effectively rehabilitate many young offenders, instead sending them to adult court prematurely or neglecting them altogether without adequate counseling, support, or accountability. Statistics show that while 57% of first-time juvenile offenders never reoffend, 27% commit one or two more crimes, and 16% commit four or more offenses.

Critics in the United States argue against maintaining a separate court system for youths and juvenile delinquents. They argue that societal perceptions of youth and adolescence are evolving, necessitating corresponding changes in the legal system. Childhood today differs significantly from historical norms, prompting some to question the necessity of a distinct juvenile court system and age deferment policies.

Globally, the United Nations has spearheaded reforms in juvenile courts and juvenile justice. Measures have been introduced to safeguard children's rights, particularly regarding punishment guidelines. There has been a shift towards less punitive approaches, with the UN General Assembly proposing measures to protect children and young people from harsh or degrading punishment. However, many Western countries have faced criticism for failing to implement these policies effectively or differentiate between youth and adult offenders in legal proceedings or sentencing.

The United Nations advocates for less severe punishment for youths and emphasizes community-based support programs over punitive measures. In the mid-20th century, the UN promoted "informalism", advocating for diversion and alternatives to formal criminal proceedings for minors, making the justice system more child-friendly. More recently, the restorative justice model has gained traction as a more effective means of processing and reintegrating youth offenders into society. However, challenges in implementing restorative justice arise from cultural differences and the model's applicability across diverse social contexts.

Critics caution against the global adoption of juvenile court reforms, highlighting the limitations of applying uniform solutions to diverse social contexts. For instance, the experiences of Moroccan youth and other ethnic minorities or migrant groups in the Netherlands illustrate the challenges of addressing local social problems through generic, broad-spectrum solutions. Juvenile courts in the Netherlands, for example, emphasize rehabilitation but often exhibit punitive tendencies in practice, exacerbating biases and exclusion for minority groups. This disparity underscores the need for nuanced consideration when implementing global practices in local communities, as globalization of youth justice may inadvertently perpetuate international scapegoating and complicate identity issues.

== See also ==
- Age of criminal responsibility
- Borstal
- Children's Court Clinic, New South Wales, Australia
- Children's Court of New South Wales, Australia
- Children's Court of Queensland, Australia
- Children's Court of Victoria, Australia
- Children's Court of Western Australia
- Gender responsive approach for girls in the juvenile justice system
- Ghanaian juvenile justice system
- Girl's court
- The Juvenile Court in Hong Kong
- Minor (law)
- Teen court, aka youth court or peer court
- Youth Court of New Zealand
- Youth Koori Court (Australia)
- Youth justice (disambiguation)
