= Juvenile justice (disambiguation) =

Juvenile justice usually refers to a system that uses juvenile courts, also known as youth courts or children's courts. It may also refer to:

- Juvenile Justice (TV series), a 2022 South Korean TV series
- New South Wales Department of Juvenile Justice, a former government department in New South Wales, Australia
- The punishment of young people in youth detention centers, also known as juvenile detention
- Juvenile detention in the Northern Territory

== See also ==
- Age of criminal responsibility
- Children's Court Clinic, New South Wales, Australia
- Children's Court of New South Wales, Australia
- Children's Court of Queensland, Australia
- Children's Court of Victoria, Australia
- Children's Court of Western Australia
- Juvenile court
- Juvenile delinquency
- Juvenile Justice (Care and Protection of Children) Act, 2000 (India)
- Juvenile Justice (Care and Protection of Children) Act, 2015 (India), replaced the 2000 Act
- Minor (law)
- Teen court, aka youth court or peer court
- Young offender
- Youth Court of New Zealand
- Youth justice (disambiguation)
- Youth Koori Court
