= Juniper Hall, Paddington =

Building in Sydney, Australia

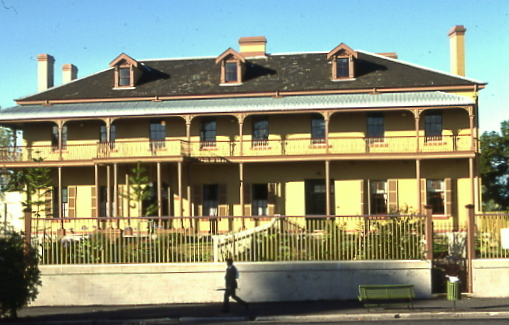
- Juniper Hall, in Paddington, Sydney

- Location within inner Sydney
- Alternative names: Ormond House

General information
- Architectural style: Victorian Georgian
- Location: 1 Ormond Street, Paddington, Sydney, New South Wales, Australia
- Coordinates: 33°53′05″S 151°13′36″E
- Completed: 1824–1825
- Renovated: 1988

Design and construction
- Developer: Robert Cooper

Renovating team
- Architect: Clive Lucas
- Renovating firm: Clive Lucas Stapleton and Partners

Website
- www.juniperhall.com.au

New South Wales Heritage Register
- Official name: Juniper Hall; Ormond House
- Type: State heritage (built)
- Criteria: a., c., d., e., f.
- Designated: 2 April 1999
- Reference no.: 00268
- Type: House
- Category: Residential buildings (private)
- Builders: Robert Cooper

Juniper Hall, also known as Ormond House, is a heritage-listed former residence and children's home and now retail building and exhibition venue located at 1 Ormond Street, Paddington, Sydney, New South Wales, Australia. It was built from 1824 to 1825 by Robert Cooper. The two-storey Old Colonial Georgian house was added to the New South Wales State Heritage Register on 2 April 1999 and is listed on the (now defunct) Register of the National Estate

Juniper Hall was originally the home of Robert Cooper, a gin distiller. He reportedly designed the house himself and had it built circa 1825, including a cellar and attic in the structure. Unlike most Georgian homes, it features an upstairs balcony, which looks out onto Oxford Street. As time went by, Juniper Hall became hidden behind a row of commercial buildings on Oxford Street. A restoration project was undertaken by the National Trust of Australia in which the commercial buildings were demolished so Juniper Hall could be seen clearly, and it was fully restored by Clive Lucas Stapleton and Partners in 1988.

The house is currently being used for the annual Doug Moran National Portrait Prize exhibition, a rotating calendar of exhibitions by portrait and photographic artists.

== History ==
=== The suburb ===
Paddington, which took its name from the London borough, lies in what were once paddocks adjacent to Victoria Barracks. It was the first of the early Sydney suburbs that was not self-sufficient - its inhabitants, unlike those of Balmain or Newtown, where work was available in local industries, had to go away each day to their places of employment. Development of the Eastern Suburbs (Edgecliff, Double Bay, Point Piper and Woollahra) surrounded this area with wealthy people's homes so this small hilly suburb lost all hope of harbour views.

The area developed after a road was constructed to link up with a pilot station that was to be built at Watsons Bay on South Head Road. John Palmer, the settlement's commissary, refused to allow people to cross his land grant at Woolloomooloo, so the road had to follow a roundabout way through Paddington to bypass his 40 hectares (100 acres). Only a handful of workers lived in the area, and it was not until 1838, when it was decided to build a new military barracks in Paddington, that life came to the area. From 1848 when Victoria Barracks had been opened (designed by Lt.-Col.George Barney) and homes for the soldiers and their families had been erected, Paddington began to assume a real identity. The barracks site land was sandy - in fact a huge sandhill was located on the western side of the Greens Road area, and the foundation trenches had to be dug very deep, to locate firm stone for the foundations. Stone was mostly quarried in the area: the stonemasons were free settlers who had worked on erection of the Customs House at what was then Semi-Circular Quay. Once the soldiers and their families moved here, shopkeepers followed. Builders moved into the area and put up 3,800 houses between 1860 and 1890. These terraces give today's Paddington its air of individuality. The first school in the area was opened in the Presbyterian manse in Oxford Street, built in 1845.

Today few of the area's original working class residents remain, as the suburb's proximity to the city has made it popular with business and professional people who prefer inner-city living in this historic area. The shopping centre, concentrated on the north side of Oxford Street, has also changed from one serving local needs to one of cafes, speciality shops and boutiques...Much of this is related to the changing population and the Village Bazaar, or Paddington Markets. The bazaar, which has operated since the mid 1970s, draws visitors from all over the city and has contributed to Paddington's development as one of Sydney's favourite tourist spots, along with Bondi Beach and The Rocks.

=== Juniper Hall ===
==== Robert Cooper ====
It is hard to imagine that in 1822 the mansion Juniper Hall, on the eastern side of Oxford Street opposite the Paddington Reservoir and Paddington Town Hall and Paddington Post Office stood alone, without the many neighbours it has today. Set in a flagged garden, it had attic windows that gave panoramic views to Rushcutters Bay and Botany Bay. Juniper Hall was built for Robert Cooper, (distiller and emancipist merchant), who with partners James Underwood and Francis Ewen Forbes, received 40 hectares (100 acres) from Governor Brisbane in c. 1818, covering the whole of north Paddington, and they agreed to erect three mansions and a distillery there. As part of their agreement, the three partners agreed to each take three acres for the erection of their own homes. A distillery was built at the foot of Cascade Street near Taylor Square and Cooper bought out his partners, and only Juniper Hall was erected. The Coopers were part of the social scene of their day and entertained many notables of that time.

Emancipist Robert Cooper (1776–1857) had lived a varied life as a gin-distiller, architect, builder, cedar cutter and wealthy London publican. He was transported in NSW in 1813 and granted a conditional pardon in 1818, by when he was eager to put down roots in the infant settlement, having joined in partnership with Underwood and Forbes, two fellow emancipists. Together with his third wife Sarah May, he built a house big enough to cope with 14 children (reputed to have increased to 20 by the time he died). He built the large two-storey house on a large block elevated 61 metres (200 ft) above Sydney Harbour and Botany Bay. In June 1824 Cooper claimed that he was "at present building" Juniper Hall and there is evidence of his subsequent occupation of the place by April 1829. Cooper is said to have promised his third wife Sarah would have "the finest house in all the colony". No architect is known to be associated with the project but Cooper was himself a part-time builder and perfectly capable of producing the comparatively simple design and erecting it with the help of specialist tradesmen.

He built a two-storey Victorian Georgian building with a basement. Four large rooms occupied each floor, while the basement contained the kitchen. To the rear were a coach house, stables and servants' quarters. The position on the top of the ridge line meant it had views across Sydney Harbour to the north and to Botany Bay to the south. He named his new home Juniper Hall, after the juniper berry used in gin's distillation, and recalling Juniper Street, the location of his former distillery in London. Cooper by this time needed a large dwelling, having 14 children from his first two marriages (both wives having died), with another 14 children to come from his union with Sarah. During the 1830s Cooper is likely to have made fashionable improvements to what had rapidly become an old-fashioned house.

Cooper left Australia in 1831 with his wife and children for England and let the house to John Kinchela, an Irish lawyer who had arrived in June 1831 to take up the post of Attorney-General in the colony, recommended by his Irish patron, the Marquis of Ormonde. Kinchela renamed the house "Ormonde Hall" in honour of his patron. Kinchela himself stayed at Ormonde House only until 1838, when the returned Cooper family moved back in. The "e" was dropped shortly after and to this day the adjacent street is named Ormond Street.

Cooper during the 1840s made an attempt to enter politics, standing for the first partially elected New South Wales Legislative Council in 1843. Despite building up to forty houses for his workers to make them eligible to vote, he failed disastrously, coming last on the ballot. Cooper blamed a sustained campaign against him in the conservative press, who had scrutinised his convict past and colourful career before the courts. In 1849, having over-speculated during that decade, he was declared bankrupt and forced to leave his house once more, mortgaging Ormond House in July 1848 for A£1,900.

==== Ormond House, private school for girls and other charitable uses ====
After the Coopers left the house was renamed "Ormond House" to dissociate itself from the gin image and passed through many hands. Its uses included a private school for girls. In May 1852 Ormond House and land was leased to A. H. H. Stephen and James Comrie. Stephen was the Founding Secretary of the recently formed Society for the Relief of Destitute Children. Up to 130 children called Ormond House home during this time. In 1858 the Society removed the Asylum to the buildings designed for it by Edmund Blacket at Randwick. Ormond House was occupied from 1858 to 1884 by a number of lessees or tenants. Robert Cooper died in 1857 and in 1858 Sarah Cooper moved back into the house. Before she died in 1863, she refurbished the house, possibly with a view to selling it. On her death it passed to her trustees, who in turn leased it to a variety of charitable and educational organisations, including the NSW Institution for the Deaf and Dumb (1868–72), a ladies' college (1873–79) and the Children's Relief Board (1884–85). From available photographs it is evident that the layout of Juniper Hall's garden was altered in various minor ways between 1870 and 1920.

In the early 1880s the NSW Government adopted a new policy on poor and destitute children which favoured boarding those in Government care with selected foster parents. This meant that a central metropolitan "home" was needed where such children could be placed pending the selection of a foster home. To this end (a renamed) "Ormond House" was leased in the first half of 1884 as a "receiving house" and office for the State Children's Relief Board. The following year the government purchased the property for A£5,800 and it was to remain in Government ownership for forty years. During 1891 and 1892 substantial additions were carried out with a large addition to the eastern end. The extension was built in a similar style to the original, and used as the probation office for the Metropolitan Shelter for Children and the Children's Court, a role it maintained until 1911. This was NSW's first Children's Court.

==== Potential redevelopment and subsequent protection and conservation ====
In 1921 Joe Gardiner, the shoe manufacturer, purchased the property for demolition and redevelopment as flats and shops. There was such a public outcry that he changed his mind and turned the house into flats and built a row of six shops in (completely displacing) its front garden facing Oxford Street. Following Gardiner's bankruptcy the property was acquired by a Melbourne firm, Avrom Investments.

At the end of World War II, an Avrom employee, Elizabeth Randall, was despatched to Sydney as a local manager. Two residents in the building interested her in its history and being a tough campaigner, she defended it successfully against the ravages of The Landlord and Tenant Act, termites, the elements, the Sydney City Council and Avrom. The defence against the last named threat was only achieved by a policy of improvement and rental increases which made Juniper Hall (as she renamed it) a paying proposition; a process which caused some distress to old established and theoretically protected tenants. Community groups such as the Paddington Society tirelessly campaigned for the conservation of Juniper Hall. In 1981 an Interim Conservation Order was placed over the property. A detailed report on the history of the house and garden was prepared by James Kerr.

A development proposal for the property prepared by Wills Denoon was considered by a new owner, Opera House Investments Pty Ltd but on 21 April 1982 ownership was transferred jointly to Manawar Pty Ltd and Golenat Pty Ltd. A development proposal on behalf of the new owners was proposed to convert the building to strata title. In 1983 a Permanent Conservation Order was placed over the property. In 1984 the State Government gave $750,000 on a dollar for dollar basis to the National Trust towards the purchase and restoration of Juniper Hall. A Trust restoration project demolished the row of shops facing Oxford Street. Following Kerr's recommendations the property was conserved under the direction of Clive Lucas Stapleton & Partners architects. The works were completed in the Bicentennary Year 1988, incorporating reception rooms, offices, gallery space, major Australian Children's Museum, a National Trust (NSW) Gift Shop and public refreshment rooms. This was one of thirteen historic properties included in "A Gift to the Nation", sponsored solely by AMATIL Ltd.

==== Gardens ====
Juniper Hall's front garden was reinstated, aiming to present its approximate appearance c. 1900. This work took place by National Trust of Australia (NSW) Garden Committee volunteers under the direction of Clive Lucas Stapleton & Partners, with research on the original layout and plant material and advice provided by James Broadbent and Michael Lehany, over the summer of 1987–8 in time for the January 1988 Australian Bicentenary celebrations. Photographs taken from the period of "Ormond House" gave the most reliable evidence of the form and extent of the garden, along with important clues remaining in the surviving fragment of original ground along the front of the facade verandah (vestiges of old bitumen and brick-edged rails to the residence's front door). The photographs showed that the western section of the garden was relatively plain and functional, presumably as having been used as the children's and public entrance. The eastern section, used by the Superintendent, was maintained and planted to a higher standard. These differences in treatment have been followed in the layout and planting schemes recreated in 1987.

Plants chosen were based on identification from photographs (where possible) and those known from plant nursery catalogues to have been sold by nurseries during that period, with a few substitutions: Moreton Bay fig in the original location in the front of the eastern garden was thought unwise in a smaller, more urban lot and setting, due to its huge scale. This was substituted with Magnolia grandiflora, which has a similar dark, large leaf and the advantage of large white scented flowers. Similarly yuccas (Spanish bayonets/Adam's needle) were thought unwise in grounds expected to be used and accessed by large numbers of people. These were substituted for Kaffir lilies (Clivia sp.). The front grounds were divided in two (in accordance with photographic evidence) by a painted picket fence, as they were when the property was a children's refuge. It was decided to recreate the western garden as a public garden planted to the Victorian taste. This has a path leading directly from one front gate to a front door, flanked by flower beds on either side. Popular plants of the period such as Agapanthus, foxgloves, chrysanthemums, Shasta daisy, field poppies, Dianthus (pinks), Verbena, Kaffir lilies and sage (Salvia) were randomly planted here. Where evidence indicated, the original species was reinstated in the same place (e.g. a pair of Norfolk Island pines (Araucaria heterophylla), Kaffir lilies and Agapanthus clumps either side of the central paths. A buffalo grass lawn was laid between central and perimeter garden beds. These latter were planted with flowering shrubs such as oleanders, Cape plumbago, sky flower (Duranta repens), Indian hawthorn (Rhaphiolepis), gardenias, jasmine, mock orange (Choisya ternata) and Abelia, well as a flower border containing old-fashioned annuals of the period.

The former superintendent's garden on the eastern side was recreated with the roundel reinstated in its centre. Paths led from the presumed front gate, around this circular bed, to end at the residence's front door. The rounded was edged with English box and filled with ubiquitous periwinkle (Vinca) as indicated in photographs. Within were planted several shrubs, typical of the era such as lavender, Camellia, Murraya, Michelia figo, Rothmannia amoena and yesterday-today and tomorrow (Brunfelsia). A large bank of Hydrangea macrophylla was planted along the front verandahs and a mixed shrubbery of Cape plumbago, jasmine and shell ginger plants were planted to screen the eastern boundary.

==== National Trust of Australia ownership ====
Juniper Hall from this time on was owned by the National Trust of Australia (NSW), which determined that the Garden Committee under the leadership of Annie Ross, were ideally placed to reinstate the garden. Its members worked tirelessly to raise over $100,000 to finance the cost of this project. The perimeter fence was rebuilt, using iron pickets instead of the earlier corrugated iron capped fence - this was a political decision to enable greater views into the property and encourage potential purchase of the front garden by Woollahra Municipal Council for use as public open space (this latter hope did not eventuate). A great quantity of old building rubble was dug out (dozens of cubic meters) and removed from the site. Dozens of cubic meters of non-saline soil were imported from Canberra (to avoid damage to the house's foundations). The Garden Committee completed the garden reinstatement work within a two-week period before 26/1/1988, working eight to ten members to a shift, in fierce January heat.

Maintenance of the garden was taken over by the Juniper Hall Committee, formed in 1989. It too raised funds, some of which were used to maintain the garden. The greatest source of plants was from donations, helping the recreated garden regain its variety and richness, subject to species being suitable for the period chosen. The grounds at the rear were economically adapted by the Garden Committee from what remained of the old residential flat gardens to form good functional outdoor spaces. Parking demanded by Council was accommodated in the gravelled service area. Since the garden has been maintained by volunteers (all trained horticulturists) and a paid gardener. Some of the fencing shown in early photographs that kept the children out of both gardens has not yet been reinstated. Juniper Hall was identified by the Properties Task Force as suitable for sale of a 99-year lease that would ensure that the property remains in Trust ownership. A conservation management plan to protect and enhance its heritage value was revised.

==== Moran family ownership ====
The property was put on the real estate market in 2012 and sold for $4.551m to the Moran family. The family plan to restore it and propose it will be the home of the Moran prizes, sponsored and administered by the Moran Arts Foundation Ltd. Additionally the original four rooms on the ground floor will be used for portrait and photographic exhibitions, with access by the general public on most days of the year. The first floor and attics are proposed to be converted into a private residence for family members.

The family have a long history of restoring historic properties, including Redleaf in Wahroonga, Blandford in Leura, Swifts in Darling Point, Studley Park in Camden and Moran House in Bridge Street, Sydney. The Morans are direct descendants of Robert and Sarah Cooper, through the matriarch Greta Moran, to the original builders and owners of Juniper Hall. Consequently, the Moran family has a genuine concern for the conservation of Juniper Hall to restore it to its former magnificence. 'The Moran family is delighted to be in a position to continue its involvement with the ongoing preservation and conversation of some of Australia's most iconic properties', said Peter Moran. The Moran family have restored the ground level as an exhibition space. Peter Moran, CEO of the Moran Arts Foundation, which houses its collection and the Moran Prizes exhibition, incorporating the Doug Moran Prize, Australia's richest art competition, at Juniper Hall.

== Description ==
=== Siting ===
The position of Juniper Hall on top of the Oxford Street ridge line means it has wide views across Sydney Harbour to the north and to Botany Bay to the south.

=== Juniper Hall garden ===
During the later 1980s the row of shops facing Oxford Street were demolished and Juniper Hall and its front garden were restored and reinstated (respectively).

The National Trust of Australia (NSW) determined that its Garden Committee under the leadership of Annie Ross, were ideally placed to reinstate the garden. Its members worked tirelessly to raise over $100,000 to finance the cost of this project. The perimeter fence was rebuilt, using iron pickets instead of the earlier corrugated iron capped fence - this was a political decision to enable greater views into the property and encourage potential purchase of the front garden by Woollahra Municipal Council for use as public open space (this latter hope did not eventuate). A great quantity of old building rubble was dug out (dozens of cubic meters) and removed from the site. Dozens of cubic meters of non-saline soil were imported from Canberra (to avoid damage to the house's foundations). The Garden Committee completed the garden reinstatement work within a two-week period before 26/1/1988, working eight to ten members to a shift, in fierce January heat.

The garden reinstatement work aiming to present the garden to its approximate appearance c.1900 took place under the direction of Clive Lucas Stapleton & Partners, with research on the original layout and plant material and advice provided by James Broadbent and Michael Lehany, over the summer of 1987–8 in time for the January 1988 Australian Bicentenary celebrations.

Photographs taken from the period of "Ormond House" gave the most reliable evidence of the form and extent of the garden, along with important clues remaining in the surviving fragment of original ground along the front of the facade verandah (vestiges of old bitumen and brick-edged rails to the residence's front door). The photographs showed that the western section of the garden was relatively plain and functional, presumably as having been used as the children's and public entrance. The eastern section, used by the Superintendent, was maintained and planted to a higher standard. These differences in treatment have been followed in the layout and planting schemes recreated in 1987.

Plants chosen were based on identification from photographs (where possible) and those known from plant nursery catalogues to have been sold by nurseries during that period, with a few substitutions: Moreton Bay fig (Ficus macrophylla) in the original location in fhe front of the eastern garden was thought unwise in a smaller, more urban lot and setting, due to its huge scale. This was substituted with a bull bay/southern/evergreen magnolia (M.grandiflora), which has a similar dark, large leaf and the advantage of large white scented flowers. Similarly yuccas (Spanish bayonets/Adam's needle) were thought unwise in grounds expected to be used and accessed by large numbers of people. These were substituted for Kaffir lilies (Clivia sp.).

The front grounds were divided in two (in accordance with photographic evidence) by a painted picket fence, as they were when the property was a children's refuge.

It was decided to recreate the western garden as a public garden planted to the Victorian taste. This has a path leading directly from one front gate to a front door, flanked by flower beds on either side. Popular plants of the period such as Nile or African lilies (Agapanthus praecox ssp. orientalis), foxgloves (Digitalis purpurea), chrysanthemums, shasta daisies (Argyranthemum maximum), field poppies (Papaver sp.), pinks (Dianthus sp./cv.), Verbena, Kaffir lilies ('Clivia miniata') and sage (Salvia sp./cv.) were randomly planted here. Where evidence indicated, the original species was reinstated in the same place (e.g. a pair of Norfolk Island pines (Araucaria heterophylla) as feature trees beside the main path on the lawn, Kaffir lilies and agapanthus clumps either side of the central paths. A buffalo grass lawn was laid between central and perimeter garden beds. The perimeter garden beds were planted with flowering shrubs such as oleanders, Cape plumbago (P.capensis), sky flower (Duranta repens), Indian hawthorn (Raphiolepis sp.), gardenias, jasmine, mock orange (Choisya ternata) and Abelia, well as a flower border containing old-fashioned annuals of the period. A hedge of cypresses was later added along the Ormond Street fence to screen this side of the garden and enclose the space.

The former superintendent's garden on the eastern side was recreated with the roundel reinstated in its centre. Paths led from the presumed front gate, around this circular bed, to end at the residence's front door.

The rounded bed was edged with English box (Buxus sempervirens) and filled with ubiquitous periwinkle (Vinca major) as indicated in photographs. Within it were planted several shrubs, typical of the era such as lavender, Camellia japonica cv., sweet box (Murraya paniculata), Port wine magnolia (Michelia figo), oleander (Nerium oleander cv.), Cape plumbago, Rothmannia amoena and yesterday-today and tomorrow (Brunfelsia sp.). A large bank of Hydrangea macrophylla was planted along the front verandahs and a mixed shrubbery of Cape plumbago, jasmine and shell ginger plants were planted to screen the eastern boundary. A more recent perimeter plantings are an Illawarra plum / plum or brown pine (Podocarpus elatus) and a Chinese tallow tree (Sapium sebiferum). Also growing here are some roses, oleander, a southern/evergreen magnolia/bull bay tree, sweet box and a Himalayan yellow jasmine (Jasminium mesnyi), the latter both on the eastern boundary and a bush along Oxford Street east of the main entry path.

Maintenance of the garden was taken over by the Juniper Hall Committee, formed in 1989. It too raised funds, some of which were used to maintain the garden. The greatest source of plants was from donations, helping the recreated garden regain its variety and richness, subject to species being suitable for the period chosen.

The grounds at the rear were economically adapted by the Garden Committee from what remained of the old residential flat gardens to form good functional outdoor spaces. Parking demanded by Council was accommodated in the gravelled service area. Since the garden has been maintained by volunteers (all trained horticulturists) and a paid gardener. Some of the fencing shown in early photographs that kept the children out of both gardens has not yet been reinstated.

=== House ===
A substantial two-storey Georgian house. It is typical of its period, lacking the elegance of John Verge's design, but following the fashion of its day, in that it has a double front door in the centre flanked by two large windows on each side. The front door and windows are unaltered and the window shutters are still in position. The front door has a fanlight in the simple Georgian position. Cedar bannisters are of simple, pleasing design, leading right up to the attic floor. Much of the original woodwork has been painted. The house is built on a sandstone ridge, and has an extensive cellar and kitchen below. The original house remains clear of later Victorian extensions sympathetic to the original design. (Heritage Office notes).

Built to his design, it had 8 rooms, a water closet, large cellar, veranda and balcony in addition to stables, kitchen, laundry and servant's quarters. It features a double front door in the centre flanked by two large windows on each side. The fanlight above the door is of grand proportions and the fluted columns an elegant reminder of the Georgian style so favoured by early colonists. Walls are of simple stuccoed brick standing on a base of local sandstone. Small-paned windows are flanked by shutters and the simple but elegant portico remains.

=== Condition ===
As at 28 February 2000, the physical condition is good. The building is substantially intact.

=== Modifications and dates ===
The following modifications were made to Juniper Hall:

- c. 1818 100-acre (40 ha) estate granted (in joint title)
- c. 1824 house completed
- 1830s "fashionable improvements" to house
- 1852–58 Children's home and court established
- 1921 erection of a row of six shops along Oxford Street boundary, destroying front garden. Conversion into flats
- 1980s demolition of row of shops from 1920s
- 1987–88 garden and grounds reinstated using early photographs, records and research. Restoration of the house for diverse (since) uses: antique shop, offices, residence above.

== Heritage listing ==
As at 14 October 2010, Juniper Hall is an early house (c. 1824–25) on a substantial scale made rare among surviving residences for having been built by an emancipist (Robert Cooper). Most of the fabric including joinery has survived substantially intact from the first half of the century and demonstrates the impact the new fashions of the 1830s had on earlier houses as well as contemporary domestic economy. It has been an early focal point in Paddington and has considerable townscape significance. On several occasions since 1921 local esteem has been a factor in preventing its demolition and redevelopment.

Juniper Hall, Paddington was listed on the New South Wales State Heritage Register on 2 April 1999 having satisfied the following criteria.

The place is important in demonstrating the course, or pattern, of cultural or natural history in New South Wales.

Juniper Hall is an early colonial house (c. 1823–1826), on a substantial scale, and is the earliest extant domestic building east of the city. It is probably Australia's oldest surviving suburban villa (i.e. residence "in the round," with at least two fronts and basement offices). It is a major physical manifestation of the life and aspirations of Robert Cooper. The building had an institutional role for a significant period, and has important associations with the history and development of child welfare facilities in Sydney. It has important associations with the Attorney general, John Kinchela.

The place is important in demonstrating aesthetic characteristics and/or a high degree of creative or technical achievement in New South Wales.

most of the fabric, including joinery has survived substantially intact from the first half of the nineteenth century, and demonstrates the impact the new fashions of the mid 1840s had on earlier houses. It retains its suburban site since the subdivision of 1877. It is a geographical landmark, and a focal point in the Paddington townscape, which predates the subdivision of the suburb for terrace houses. Together with the nearby Town Hall and Post office, Juniper Ha;; forms an important suburban civic precinct. Additions made to the building in the late nineteenth century respect the original house. These additions are substantial, sympathetic and intact.

The place has strong or special association with a particular community or cultural group in New South Wales for social, cultural or spiritual reasons.

It has achieved social significance in the twentieth century, when local esteem has been an important factor in preventing its demolition and redevelopment.

The place has potential to yield information that will contribute to an understanding of the cultural or natural history of New South Wales.

It contains interiors with interpretation potential to display aspects of the history of the building and its occupants.

The place possesses uncommon, rare or endangered aspects of the cultural or natural history of New South Wales.

It is rare among surviving residences of the period, having been built by an emancipist.

== See also ==
- Australian residential architectural styles
- Paddington Reservoir
- Paddington Town Hall
- Paddington Post Office
