= Robert Cooper (Australian businessman) =

Australian businessman (1777–1857)

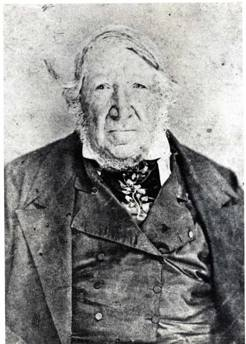
Portrait of Australian businessman, Robert Cooper c.1855

Robert Cooper (1777–1857) was an Australian businessman in the early Colonial era of Sydney, responsible for the construction of many notable buildings and commercial ventures.

Cooper was born in London on 15 May 1777 to fishmonger Francis and Frances (née Pilkinton) Cooper, and ran two public houses in London, the White Swan on Ratcliffe Highway in the docklands and another in Piccadilly. In October 1812 he was convicted of smuggling and receiving stolen goods and was sentenced to penal transportation for fourteen years to New South Wales arriving on the Earl Spencer in October 1813. He received a conditional pardon in 1818.

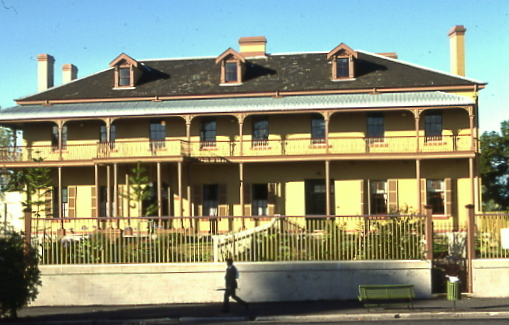
Juniper Hall

In Sydney he was a prolific businessman. Around 1819, he opened a shop in George Street opposite the Town Hall and was running trading ventures to Van Diemans Land in a small ship he bought. He also obtained an Auctioneer's licence and opened a distillery and brewery. Other ventures included milling flour and bread, cedar cutting, production of gunpowder, and weaving of cloth.

By 1830 he was one of the most wealthy men in Sydney becoming one of the principal shareholders in the Bank of New South Wales. He also owned large tracts of land in Paddington, Chippendale, Leichardt and Waterloo, Sydney. He stood as a candidate for Sydney in the New South Wales Legislative Council at the first elections in 1843, but ran last.

He established Willeroo Station on the shore of Lake George, outside of Canberra Australia, and built Juniper Hall in Paddington at the time the largest house in the Colony of New South Wales. He also commissioned Paddington Town Hall and founded Sydney Grammar School.

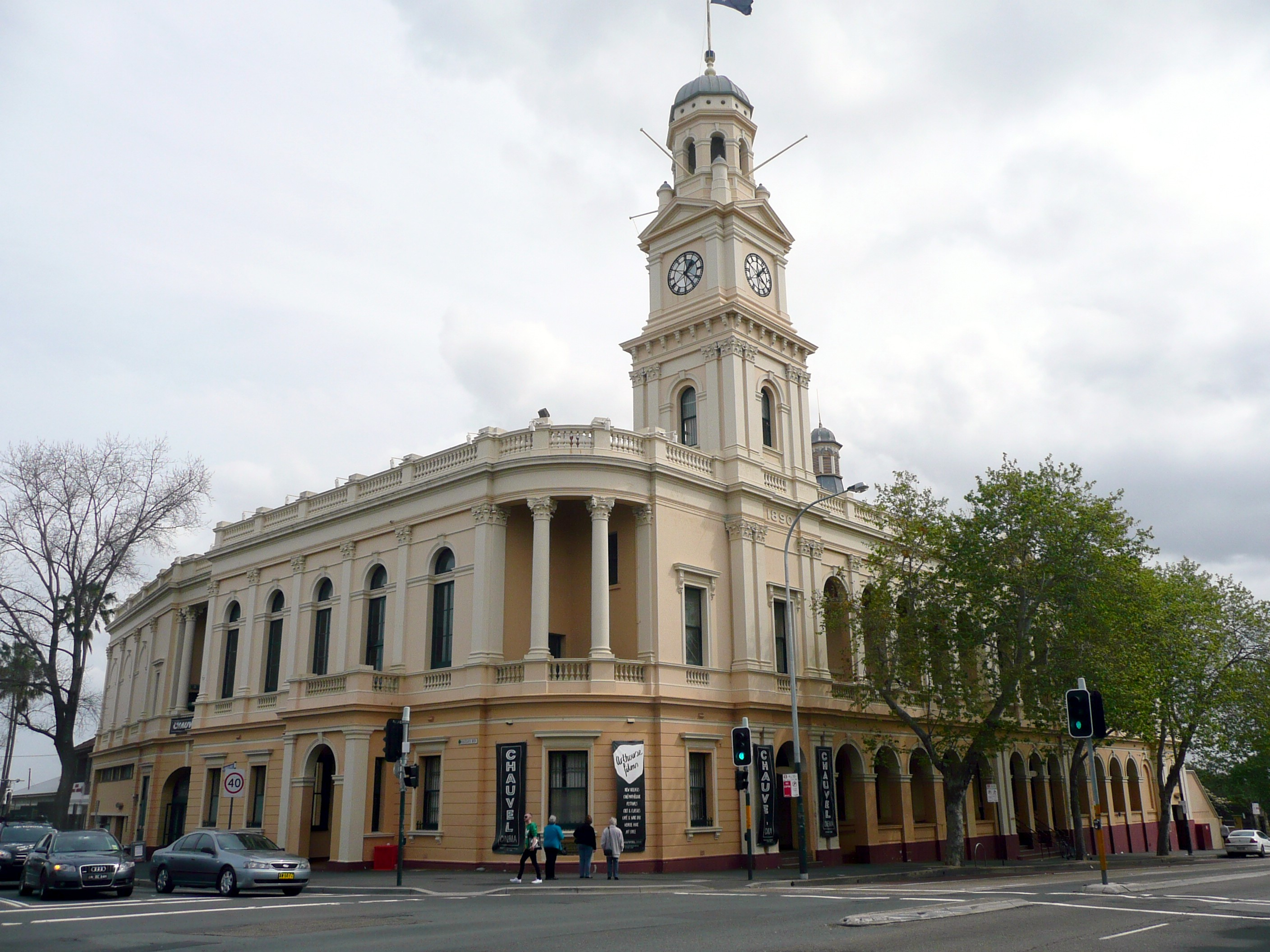
Paddington Town Hall

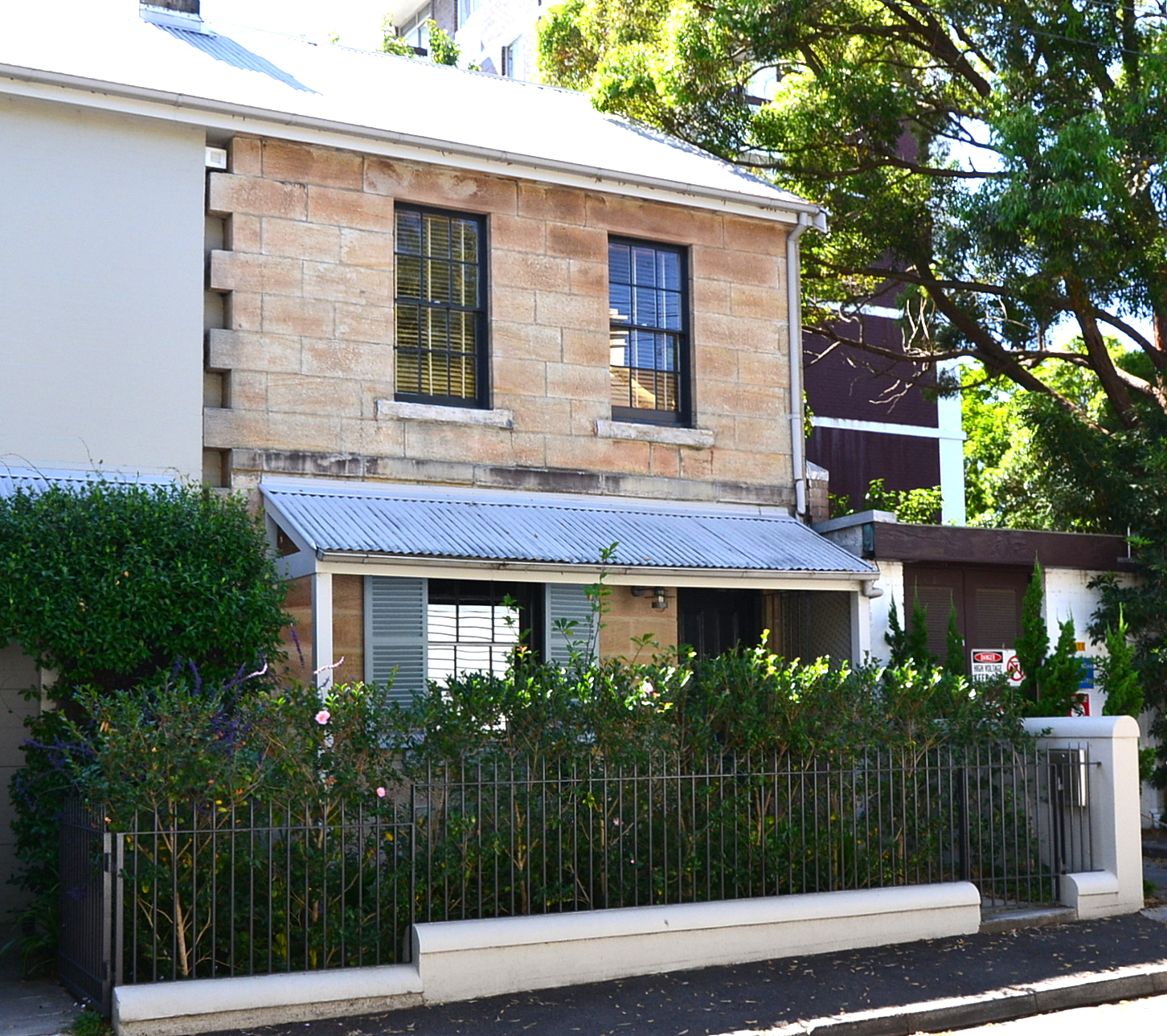
Underwood Street Paddington

== Family life ==
Cooper was known affectionately as 'Robert the Large'. He had three wives. Cooper's first wife died in 1818 in England soon after his conviction, his second wife, Elizabeth Kelley, died in childbirth 1821 in January 1822 he married a third time to Sarah May, from the Hawkesbury River district. Altogether he had some twenty-eight children. His son Frederick Augustus (1834-1908), became a barrister and served as a member of both the New South Wales and Queensland legislatures, another Robert Cooper was Mayor of Ulladulla in 1896. His grandson was Sir Pope Alexander Cooper, Attorney General of Queensland and also Chief Judge of the Supreme Court of Queensland.

Cooper died at Paddington on 25 May 1857, aged 80, and his wife Sarah died on 6 November 1863.
