= Neal Hazel =

Neal Hazel is a British criminologist and social policy analyst who is best known for his research on youth justice and on family support. He is Professor of Criminology and Criminal Justice at the University of Salford and is the former Her Majesty's Deputy Chief Inspector of Probation for England and Wales.

== Academic and research career ==
Hazel completed his undergraduate degree, MSc in Applied Social Research and PhD in Social Policy at the University of Stirling. After his doctorate, he was Research Fellow and Senior Research Fellow at the Policy Research Bureau, London. He joined the University of Salford in 2003 as a Lecturer and then Senior Lecturer in Criminology, and now holds a Personal chair in the School of Health and Society. He was the inaugural Director of both the Institute for Public Policy (2013–14) and the Centre for Social Research (2010–14) at the University of Salford. He has directed more than 25 funded research projects, including several national evaluations of criminal justice interventions.

=== Family research ===
Hazel published the first national study of the impact of poverty and disadvantage on parenting in Britain. Reported in the book Parenting in Poor Environments (2002, with Deborah Ghate), the study of coping and support for families living in poverty was described by Bob Holman in the British Journal of Social Work as "an important study which lifts the curtain on if and how poor parents cope in deprived areas". Community Care stated that its "crucial findings" formed "an emphatic message to practitioners" to ensure more evidence-based support.

He also conducted the United Kingdom's first national study of parental discipline. Its findings led to a national campaign by the NSPCC in 2005 against the physical punishment of children.

Hazel's book on Engaging Fathers in Preventive Services (2000, with Debrorah Ghate and Catherine Shaw) introduced the concept of “gender differentiated” parenting support. The research challenged existing feminised family services by showing the importance of catering to the particular needs and experiences of men in order to engage them. This approach has since been adopted as a standard requirement of family services by policy makers in Great Britain.

=== Criminal justice research ===
Hazel conducted the first study of young offenders' views of their experiences throughout the criminal justice system in England. He also produced the official government evaluation of the main youth custodial sentence in England and Wales (the Detention and Training Order) and several evaluations of government schemes for resettlement (reentry) after prison. His 2001 article revealing common patterns behind the rise and fall of types of youth custodial institutions (with Ann Hagell) is listed by Youth Justice (journal) as both one of its most cited and most read articles.

Hazel's cross-national analysis of youth justice systems (2008) is used as the basis of international comparisons in Ministry of Justice official youth justice statistics. It was also used and credited in the 2013 documentary film, Kids for Cash.

His framework and five principles for effective reentry support for juvenile offenders (2017) were described by the Youth Justice Minister as "a gold standard for resettlement planning". They have since been adopted by the Ministry of Justice, HM Prison and Probation Service and Youth Justice Board as a common policy approach to reform youth detention across England and Wales, called Constructive Resettlement. His other publications from the same research programme (Beyond Youth Custody) with Nacro include a report revealing psychological suffering by young people after release from custody (2015), a new model for how to address the specific needs of girls and young women leaving prison (2014), and guidance on ensuring better engagement from young offenders (2013).

== Public appointments ==
In 2013, Hazel was appointed as an advisor to the HM Inspectorate of Probation (HMIP) for inspection of services across England and Wales for youth reentry after detention.

From 2014 to 2015, he served in the newly created role of Her Majesty's Deputy Chief Inspector of Probation for England and Wales, responsible for strategy at HMIP. During his time at HMIP, he designed a method of inspecting criminal justice agencies that focused on evaluating whether and how services were impacting on offenders, rather than the previous practice of auditing services' processes. He also introduced the strategic aim for HMIP to improve the wellbeing of children at risk of reoffending, and a peer review system to check the quality of inspection reports.

In January 2018, he was appointed by the Secretary of State for Justice to sit on the Youth Justice Board (YJB), responsible for overseeing the youth justice system in England and Wales. He was previously a member of the YJB's Expert Advisory Board for developing government policy on youth reentry after detention.

== Selected publications ==
- Engaging Fathers in Preventive Services (2000) (with Deborah Ghate and Catherine Shaw) York, YPS. ISBN 1902633490
- Parenting in Poor Environments: Stress, Support and Coping (2002) (with Deborah Ghate) London, Jessica Kingsley. ISBN 184310069X
- Cross-national Comparison of Youth Justice Systems (2008) London, Youth Justice Board
- Young People's Stress After Release from Custody (2015) (with Tim Bateman) London, Nacro
- The Resettlement of Girls and Young Women (2014) (with Tim Bateman) London, Nacro
- Engaging Young People in Resettlement (2013) (with Tim Bateman) London, Nacro
- Resettlement of Young People Leaving Custody: Lessons from the Literature (2013) (with Tim Bateman and Sam Wright) London, Nacro
- "Now all I care about is my future": Supporting the shift (2017) (with Pippa Goodfellow, Mark Liddle, Tim Bateman and John Pitts) London, Nacro
