= Ghanaian juvenile justice system =

The Ghanaian flag

The Ghanaian juvenile justice system encompasses the processes to handle minors who are in conflict with the law or who are in need of care and protection. The formal Ghanaian juvenile justice system was created under colonial rule and has evolved greatly since the early 1900s. Three stark changes for the system are throughout the colonial period, the beginnings of independence and the 1960 Criminal Procedure Code (Act 30), and the newest Juvenile Justice Act (Act 653) (JJA).

The justice system first emerged in colonial Ghana between 1906 and 1911. Though the system was very small and only detected over 1,000 juveniles in conflict with the law by the 1950s, the institutions created by the colonists were used by independent Ghana. Dr Stacey Hynd argued that the colonial juvenile justice system used juvenile delinquent treatment facilities to reform the youth into being better colonial subjects. Ghana underwent their next major reform after the Ghana Independence Act 1957. They created the 1960 Criminal Procedure Code. This code was then used as the principal legislation to dealing with delinquent youth. These issues were dealt with only by the Juvenile Court whose main goal was to determine the guilt of any juvenile that was brought to it. This system was then reformed again by the Juvenile Justice Act of 2003 (JJA). JJA attempted to reform the previous code by injecting principles of welfare, and international standards that uphold human rights and restorative justice.

== History and Background ==
=== Child justice in pre-colonial Ghana ===
The justice system in pre-colonial was not separated from the adult system. Unlike colonial and post-colonial Ghana, crime was not defined by the breaking of laws. There was no formal system, in pre-colonial Ghana crime was defined as sins against ones community, tribe, or family. Adults and children who committed sins were often treated in the same way. The village chief and his council of elders were the main social controllers of pre-colonial Ghana, ultimately determining how to handle issues of crime. These issues were also handled by the accused's extended family and peers.

=== Juvenile in conflict with the law in colonial Ghana ===
The British began occupying Ghana, what they called the Gold Coast, in 1821. The formal talkings of how to deal with juvenile delinquency under colonial ruled Ghana, emerged between 1906 and 1911. In this time period nearly 30–70 juveniles were put in detention facilities each year. Governor Guggisberg based this emerging detention model on the English model. The early forms of the detention of juveniles were quickly overwhelmed with increasing numbers of juvenile delinquents. Out of this was formed the formal juvenile justice system in the Gold Coast, created in 1928. This was the first time juveniles who broke the Gold Coast law were separated from adults who committed crimes, in all of Ghana's history. Judges had the power to send juvenile boys to the Boys' School at Ada, which was supervised by the Salvation Army. This school was charged with caring and treating juvenile delinquents. Under this system, a juvenile was defined as a person under the age of 16. The British set up a number of juvenile justice institutions. After the Boys' School at Ada was established in 1929 it was renamed and moved three times between 1936 and 1947. The supervision of the school was transferred from the Salvation Army to the Department of Education, which was newly formed in 1945. In 1945 the first industrial school was also established to deal with juveniles between the ages of 16 and 21. The industrial school was tasked with dealing with juveniles who required more serious corrective training. The colonial powers began to more rapidly expand the juvenile justice system. Some viewed this to be a display of the strength of colonial discipline, arguably attempting to show the British's commitment to welfare and reform. They established a second Boys Industrial School in Tamale, an Industrial School for Girls in Accra and other remand and probation homes. These institutions were continued to use as a foundation for post-colonial independent Ghana's juvenile justice system. The nature of the delinquents crimes in Ghana shifted. In the beginnings of the formation nearly 80% of juvenile delinquents in the Gold Coast were charged with theft. However, by the 1950s many of the delinquents were a part of youth sub-cultures and urban gangs. In addition, the detection of juvenile justice delinquents dramatically increased over the years, jumping from about 200 to 300 per year in the 1920s–1930s to over 1,000 per year in the mid-1950s.

Hynd argued that under the colonial state Juveniles were seen as threats, they represented an unknown future, and a loss of control. Hynd argues that the British colonial power used the treatment and care of juvenile delinquents to socially reform the youth into being colonial subjects. She stated, the colonists attempted to reform the delinquents through both the body and the mind. This included physical discipline, as well as labor and education. She also stated it was geared towards reforming the juvenile delinquents into being economically productive and morally abiding citizens.

=== Criminal Procedure Code (Act 30) of 1960, Juvenile Justice in Independent Ghana ===
The Criminal Procedure Code (Act 30) reformed the previous juvenile justice systems implemented by the British. The Criminal Procedure Act raised the age of juveniles from 16 to 17. The code gave the juvenile court exclusive control over the cases and decisions involving juveniles. The structure of the court involved an appointed Chief Justice of the court and included a panel of three people, the magistrate, and two lay magistrates. The court was tasked with ruling if the juvenile is guilty. Court hearings were private and not open to the public. The code also allowed the juveniles who were accused a lawyer. The court dealt with juveniles delinquents through two overarching methods, non-institutional and institutional ways. Non-institutional ways included supervision by a probation officer, committal to the care of a relative or other fit person, payment of fines, damages or costs, or payment of fines by parents or guardians deemed to have contributed to the commission of a crime by the juvenile. The institutional options included industrial schools, probation homes, remand homes, or the Borstal Institute. Girls had many fewer institutional options available to them. The Code also empowered the Juvenile Court with not only seeing juveniles who broke the law, but overseeing cases of juveniles in need of care and protection. Those in need of care and protection have not committed any crimes or broken any rules of the code rather were placed into the juvenile justice system out of pure necessity. This ultimately caused those in need of care to be treated very similarly to those who committed a crime.

The 1960 Criminal Code was adapted to conform to the current fourth republican constitution of Ghana established in 1992.

==== Problems with the Criminal Procedure Code (Act 30) of 1960 ====
Many argued that the Code lacked adequate resources to carry out the processes the code laid out. For example, one mandate of the code was that officers must make contact with parents/guardians when a juvenile is arrested. Though the code mandated this, Drs Baerg and Hoffman noted that in reality it was difficult to execute. Due to a lack of a formal address system, it was not easily accessible to contact parents/guardians. Issues such as this, ultimately led to officers persuading juveniles to inflate their age so they could get around the more complicated rules of the juvenile justice system, such as contacting parents. In addition, though the code outlines the necessity for legal representation these researchers observed that most juveniles did not have.

== Juvenile Justice Act of (2003) – JJA ==
The Code underwent another wave of reformation under the JJA. The objective of the JJA was to protect children's rights and to meet international standards and norms. This was the first major in juvenile justice policy since the Criminal Procedure Act. The JJA defines a juvenile offender in Ghana as someone between the ages of 12 and 18 who commits a crime. The court can then impose a sentence of one month and upwards or with a fine. The JJA aimed to reform the system to be more on the basis of welfare, international standards of human rights, and restorative justice.

A juvenile first makes contact with the system through an arrest. One can be arrested with or without a warrant. Both public officials and private people can arrest juveniles. A private person can arrest a juvenile when a crime is committed in that private persons presence. The private person can arrest the juvenile, but then must hand over the juvenile to the authorities. The JJA emphasizes the importance on releasing juveniles through bail unless the juvenile is of serious danger to the community. The importance of bail is also emphasized through international law and customs. The juvenile will then go through the juvenile court. The juvenile court is responsible with the jurisdiction of all juvenile cases except if the juvenile is charged with an adult. A juvenile is charged as an adult if they are charged with an offense that would grant the death penalty, or when a juvenile court is not constituted for an area. The JJA maintained sentencing in both an institutional and non-institutional way. There is a juvenile court in all 10 regions of Ghana. Under the JJA in the court there is supposed to be a judge, a court clerk, a social worker or a probation officer, a police officer, the parent or guardian, a two-member panel and depending on the case a witness. The police acts as the prosecutor in the juvenile court and does not dress in uniform. Similarly the judge or magistrate does not wear a robe as they would in the adult court. The two-member panel serves as advisory to the judge. The court proceedings are only allowed to be watched by those directly involved in the case. The JJA continued previous methods of using both institutional and non-institutional ways to deal with juveniles. These sentencings include "conditional or unconditional discharge, discharge upon making an undertaking probation, committal to the care of a relative or fit person, payment of fines, damages or costs by juvenile or parents and detention." The JJA prohibits imprisonment and the death penalty of juveniles. In terms of detention centers there are both junior and senior correctional centres. Junior correctional centres are generally used for those under 18 and senior correctional centres are used for those between 18 and 21. Although as stated earlier some juveniles are treated as adults depending on the seriousness of their crime, these juveniles could be detained in a senior centre. Once the juvenile goes through court they will receive a sentence. The lengths of sentences vary according to age and seriousness of offence. Unlike the Code in 1960 which sent juveniles to detentions for three years or longer. Juveniles below 16 cannot be held for more than three months. After the juveniles sentences are complete they can be granted parole and will be placed under supervision by a probation officer.

=== The Child Panel (CP) ===
The JJA attempted to reform some of the issues the Code of 1960 posed by establishing the Child Panel. They created the CP to introduce alternative measures. The CP was created to deal with juveniles in need of care and protection. It was tasked with dealing with the rights of children, parental responsibilities, and minor criminal matters where the offence is not aggravated. The CP hearing is entitled the welfare tribunal. They are quasi-judicial bodies. It is made up of lay members, the child's parents or guardian, a social worker and the child. The Child Panel includes the chairman of the social services sub-committee, a member of a women's organization, a representative of the traditional council, a district worker, a member of the justice and security sub-committee and other citizens in the community who are believed to be of high moral character. The CP focuses on restorative justice using victim–offender mediation (VOM) and victim–offender reconciliation mediation (VORM).

== Challenges with implementation of the JJA ==
Though the JJA made many reforms to the juvenile justice system, some argue that it continues to fail to implement these reforms. Part of the challenges of implementation are due to a lack of resources and funding. For example, probation officers are supposed to follow up with a child on probation. But in one study performed by Dr. Beatrice Adumea Kumi, probation officers state that they do not have enough resources to trace the parents or relatives of the juvenile. Probation officers in this study reported that they often have to use their own funds to properly follow up with a juvenile on probation. In addition the same report stated that officers had a lack of proper training. For example, there is a law in the JJA that states that juveniles should not remain in custody for more than 48 hours after arrest. In a case study performed by Dr. Stephanie Hoffman and Corrine Baerg, many police officers did not even know this law. Another study performed by Dr. Robert K. Ameh, analyzed the status of the JJA and focused on the Juvenile Justice System in Accra. Their findings suggest that the JJA is not meeting the United Nations Standard Minimum Rules for the Administration of Juvenile Justice or the JJA's standards. For example, Section 7.1 of this UN standard says that juveniles have a right to the presumption of innocence, a right to counsel, a right to the presence of a parent or guardian among many others. The study done in Accra noted that most juveniles did not have parents or guardians present or legal representation. The study noted that parents were only notified after the juvenile had been arrested. In addition, both the JJA and UN standard says that parents or guardians must be immediately informed of a juveniles arrest or contact with the juvenile justice system. In reality the researchers observed that the police rarely do this. They also observe that bail is rarely granted despite UN standards outlined in Section 10.2 and the laws of the JJA. In addition, though they identified a lack of organization in the court noting that dockets were often missing or wrong. The study also pointed out that though the JJA outlined non-institutional and institutional ways to deal with juveniles in conflict with the law, but most were put in detention. Many of the crimes the juveniles were accused of were non-violent, yet they were still put in detention facilities. The UN rules, which Ghana signed into also states that untried detainees should be separated from convicted juveniles. Though this often does not happen in Ghana, researchers noted that girls who are convicted and awaiting trial often live together in the Girl's Remand Home and Correctional Centre. In addition, though the Juvenile Justice System is supposed to use probation for juveniles, it was observed that probation is rarely used due to logistical inabilities, such as funding, or lack of personnel to enforce.

There are also many challenges to the Child Panels. Similarly there is an issue of funding. Many members of the child panel are not paid the allowances they are supposed to be paid. This results in some CP members resigning as they cannot fund the costs associated with being on the CP. In addition, in some areas there is no child panel and so the juvenile justice system fills all the duties that the CP would fill. For example, in a study done by Drs Robert Ame, Lilian Ayete-Nyampong and Dzifa Ami Gakpleazi, there was no knowledge that CPS existed in some areas such as the Western Region of Ghana. They also noted that the Accra Metropolitan Assembly (AMA) Child Panel in the Greater Accra Region has not met since 2010. These authors cited that although the Child Panel has great intent to be restorative, it cannot properly execute.

== Proposed reforms ==
One major reform some propose is to put more funding into the administration of juvenile justice system. This would solve issues such as lawyer accessibility and the training of staff. Another proposed reform to help fix recidivism is to have a child psychologist in juvenile justice institutions. A proposed reform could be to work more closely with Ghana Education Services to provide better education to juveniles. In addition many critique the lack of inclusion of juveniles parents. Juveniles often have to go back to homes from which they have become disconnected. Including parents could help alleviate this burden on the children. Another proposed reform is to include community service in the juvenile justice system. One study suggests that community service is effective in helping to reduce recidivism. The JJA does not currently make provision for community service, unlike many other nations.

== Lack of data ==
Ghana's official police records are not comprehensive and fail to record all cases. There is also a lack of delinquency research. Therefore, it is difficult to truly assess the prevalence and the causes of juvenile delinquency.
