= Youth justice =

Youth justice may refer to:

- Youth Justice (journal)
- Youth justice in England and Wales
- Youth justice in New Zealand

== See also ==
- Age of criminal responsibility
- Juvenile justice (disambiguation)
- Minor (law)
- Youth detention center
