= Parramatta Justice Precinct =

Justice services in western Sydney

Coordinates: 33.812439°S 151.001685°E

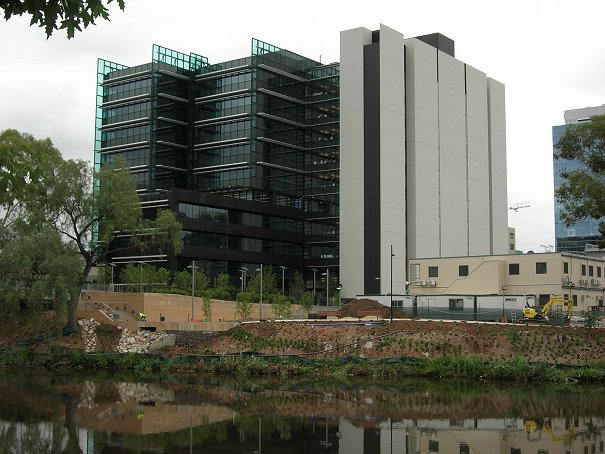
The Parramatta Justice Precinct (under construction), pictured in 2008.

The Parramatta Justice Precinct (PJP) is located in the western part of the Parramatta (/ˌpærəˈmætə/) central business district. The precinct houses the corporate headquarters of the Department of Communities and Justice, the Children's Court of New South Wales, the Sydney West Trial Courts, Legal Aid Commission of NSW, Office of Trustee and Guardian (formerly the Office of the Protective Commissioner), NSW Registry of Births, Deaths and Marriages and Office of the Director of Public Prosecutions. Nearby on Marsden Street is the Parramatta Courthouse and a courthouse where the specialist Drug Court of New South Wales sits. The Garfield Barwick Commonwealth Law Courts Building (named in honor of Sir Garfield Barwick), houses courts of the Federal Magistrates Court of Australia and the Family Court of Australia. The Parramatta Justice Precinct provides, in addition to judicial and administrative functions, community service health- and welfare-related needs.

== History ==
=== Parramatta Courthouse ===
The first Parramatta courthouse was opened by Governor Arthur Phillip in 1791 and was closed and demolished in 1826 due to the poor condition of the building. Thereafter, the Parramatta district used a rented building for judicial activities.

The second Parramatta courthouse, located at the corner of Church Street and George Street, was designed by Mortimer Lewis, built in 1837 by Houlson and Payten, and extended in 1853. It was in use between 1837 and 1891. Following its disestablishment, some of the original courthouse's columns were used to form the Boer War Memorial in Parramatta Park; the remainder of the courthouse is now the Courthouse Wall.

The third Parramatta courthouse, located at the corner of George Street and Marsden Street, was opened in 1896. In the 1940s, a new courthouse and offices were added; but, it was still inadequate and a new courthouse was required. Notably, this courthouse bore the royal coat of arms of the United Kingdom.

The fourth Parramatta courthouse, located across the road from the fifth and current Parramatta courthouse, was opened on 8 November 1974, by Governor Sir Roden Cutler. The courthouse remained in operation from 1974 till 2008.

The Parramatta Courthouse, the fifth and current courthouse opened in Parramatta, is a courthouse complex located within the Parramatta Justice Precinct. The complex includes a Children's Court and a trial court with nine courtrooms for criminal trials.

=== Parramatta Justice Precinct ===
The area on which the current Parramatta Justice Precinct is located was the site for health services since 1790, including the Colonial Hospital, founded in 1818.

In August 2005, the Parramatta Justice Precinct project was conceived and the contract, for AUD 300 million, for the design and construction project was won by Brookfeld Multiplex. The Precinct's offices are highly energy efficient and are rated 5-star Green Star developments and 5-star Australian Building Greenhouse Rating.

== In Media ==
The precinct was featured prominently in the ABC television drama series Crownies, broadcast during 2011, and the subsequent spin-off series, Janet King, broadcast between 2014 and 2016.
