= Positive youth justice =

In social work, the Positive Youth Justice (PYJ) model is an approach to working with children and young people in conflict with the law that focuses on encouraging positive behaviours and outcomes.

Differing PYJ programs have been used in the United Kingdom and the United States.

== Description ==
PYJ is both reactionary and progressive. It is reactionary against contemporary risk-based models of youth justice that stigmatize and exclude children by prioritizing the prevention of negative behaviors and outcomes (e.g. offending, re-offending, re-conviction, substance use, antisocial behaviour) that allegedly result from exposure to risk factors. This approach portrays children as passive, helpless, risky and dangerous unless adults intervene in their lives using risk-focused responses.

PYJ is progressive through its focus on promoting positive behaviors and outcomes for children (e.g. access to their universal rights, access to and engagement with support services, opportunities and guidance, educational attainment, employment and training). PYJ seeks to normalize offending behavior by children and to respond through promotional, child-friendly, diversionary and inclusionary interventions.

== United Kingdom ==
The successful application of the PYJ model in England and Wales has been illustrated by the 'Children First, Offenders Second' approach, a form of PYJ advocating the systemic use of child-friendly and child-appropriate responses grounded in positive prevention, diversion, evidence-based partnership working, children's participation and engagement, legitimacy and Responsibilising responsibilising adults to ensure positive outcomes for children. This body of work has been the primary research output of Professor Kevin Haines and Professor Stephen Case.

== United States ==
In the United States, a form of PYJ is supported by researchers at the John Jay College of Criminal Justice in New York City. The U.S. model is an effort to blend the science of adolescent development with the practice principles of positive youth development to design interventions for justice-involved youth. The PYJ model encourages youth justice systems to focus on protective factors as well as risk factors, strengths as well as problems, positive outcomes as well as negative outcomes, and generally to focus on facilitating successful transitions to adulthood for young people. As promulgated in the U.S., the PYJ model is designed to facilitate youths' acquisition of two key assets (learning/doing and attaching/belonging) in six separate life domains (work, education, relationships, community, health, and creativity).

There are important differences between PYJ in the USA and in England and Wales.
