= Barbara Holborow =

Australian magistrate

Barbara Holborow OAM
- Holborow in 2000
- Born: Barbara Anne Edmonds; 29 June 1930; Sydney, Australia
- Died: 23 May 2012 (aged 81); Croydon Park, New South Wales, Australia

Barbara Anne Holborow OAM (née Edmonds, 29 June 1930 – 23 May 2012) was an Australian magistrate in the New South Wales Children's Court.

== Biography ==
Holborow was born on 29 June 1930 to William Edmonds, a painter and decorator, and Elsie (née ) Dunlop, aged 45 at the time of Holborow's birth, as the only surviving child of the family, two sons having predeceased her. As a child she very much enjoyed playing the piano, later saying it was her "best friend". She was diagnosed with type 1 diabetes at age thirteen. She married John Holborow, who was then an insurance agent, in 1953, and worked as a secretary in his office; the couple had a son, who died shortly after birth due to complications related to Holborow's diabetes, and a daughter. The couple separated shortly after their daughter's birth.

Shortly after the separation, she began working as a secretary for a solicitor in the area, at first part-time and gradually full-time. While working and raising her daughter, she completed her high school certificate at Burwood Evening School and then completed a degree at Sydney Law School, becoming a lawyer around 1970 at the age of 40. After graduating she began her own practice, working on the side as a runner (scout) for a bookmaker until her practice was established. She was appointed as a magistrate in the New South Wales Children's Court around 1982; she later recalled that due to the rarity of her having been appointed from outside the government system, her new colleagues went on strike to protest her appointment. She was nicknamed "the children's champion" during her time in court and worked for a number of issues throughout her legal career. These included a separate jail for first-time offenders aged 18 to 25 (now known as the Parklea Correctional Centre and changed in scope), a "care court" (established in 1992 in Campsie and merged back into the children's court in 2006), and free legal aid for children, established in 1973. During her law career she fostered several neglected children she had represented; she felt most attached to two Indigenous children, one of whom became her adopted son and another, a girl, lived with her for eight or nine years.

Holborow retired from the children's court in 1994 after 12 years. She continued to be active in children's advocacy until her death, publishing three books, appearing on the current affairs program 60 Minutes, and writing a regular column in the magazine That's Life!. She died due to lung cancer on 23 May 2012 in her Croydon Park home at the age of 81.

== Recognition ==
Holborow received a Medal of the Order of Australia at the 2002 Australia Day Honours "for service to the community as a magistrate and through organisations promoting the welfare and rights of children". In 2012 she was named New South Wales Senior Australian of the Year. She appeared on the TV series This Is Your Life in 1999. Barbara Holborow Park in her home suburb of Croydon Park is named in her honour.

== Works ==
- Holborow, Barbara (March 2009) [first published 1997]. Neville, Cliff; Fife-Yeomans, Janet (eds.). Those Tracks on My Face (2nd ed.). Fremantle, Western Australia: Vivid Publishing. ISBN 9780980597233.
- Holborow, Barbara (1999). Webb, Nola; Neville, Cliff (eds.). Barbara Holborow's Kids : loving for life. Milsons Point, New South Wales: Random House. ISBN 9780091839376.
- Holborow, Barbara (2003). The good, the bad and the inevitable. Sydney: Random House. ISBN 9781740511902.
