= Children (Care and Protection) Act 1987 =

The Children (Care and Protection) Act 1987 was legislation in New South Wales that dealt with the guardianship and care of children. It was repealed by section 3 of the Children and Young Persons Legislation (Repeal and Amendment) Act 1998 and replaced with the Children and Young Persons (Care and Protection) Act 1998.
