= Paddington Post Office =

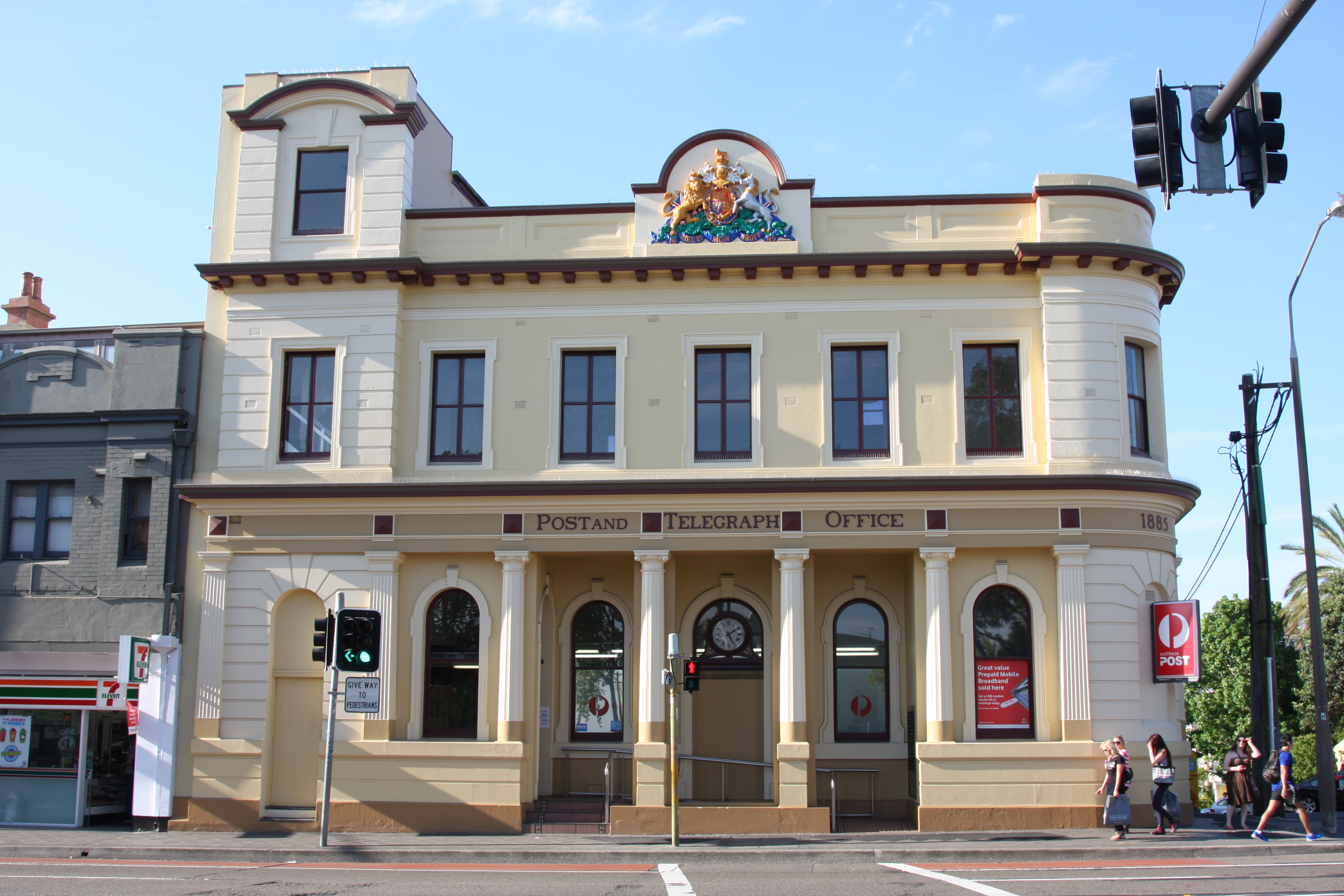
- The post office viewed from Oxford Street in 2011

- Location within inner Sydney

General information
- Status: Completed
- Type: Post office
- Architectural style: Victorian Italianate; Victorian Free Classical
- Location: 246 Oxford Street, Paddington, Sydney, Australia
- Coordinates: 33°53′05″S 151°13′35″E
- Completed: 1885
- Opened: 26 December 1885
- Cost: A£2,235; plus A£40 for the exterior clock
- Owner: Australia Post

Technical details
- Material: Stuccoed masonry, timber joinery
- Floor count: 2

Design and construction
- Architects: James Barnet; Walter Liberty Vernon
- Architecture firm: New South Wales Government Architect
- Main contractor: William Farley

Commonwealth Heritage List
- Type: Historic
- Criteria: a., d., e., g.
- Designated: 8 November 2011
- Reference no.: 105300

New South Wales Heritage Register
- Official name: Paddington Post Office
- Type: State heritage (built)
- Criteria: a., c., d., e., f., g.
- Designated: 22 December 2000
- Reference no.: 01418
- Type: Post Office
- Category: Postal and Telecommunications
- Builders: Original building by William Farley

The Paddington Post Office (postcode: 2021) is a heritage-listed post office located at 246 Oxford Street in Paddington, a suburb of Sydney, Australia. The post office is owned and operated by Australia Post. The building was also a former telephone exchange. It was designed by the New South Wales Colonial Architect's Office under James Barnet and later Walter Liberty Vernon, and was built by William Farley. The building was added to the Commonwealth Heritage List, the New South Wales State Heritage Register on 22 December 2000, and the (now defunct) Register of the National Estate.

== History ==
=== Paddington ===
This suburb, which took its name from the London borough, lies in what were once paddocks adjacent to Victoria Barracks. It was the first of the early Sydney suburbs that was not self-sufficient – its inhabitants, unlike those of Balmain or Newtown, where work was available in local industries, had to go away each day to their places of employment. Development of the Eastern Suburbs (Edgecliff, Double Bay, Point Piper and Woollahra) surrounded this area with wealthy people's homes so this small hilly suburb lost all hope of harbour views.

The area developed after a road was constructed to link up with a pilot station that was to be built at Watson's Bay (South Head Road). John Palmer, the settlement's commissary, refused to allow people to cross his land grant ('Woolloomooloo'), so the road had to follow a roundabout way through Paddington to bypass his 40 hectares (100 acres). Only a handful of workers lived in the area, and it was not until 1838, when it was decided to build a new military barracks in Paddington, that life came to the area.

From 1848 when Victoria Barracks had been opened (designed by Lt.-Col.George Barney) and homes for the soldiers and their families had been erected, Paddington began to assume a real identity...The (barracks site) land was sandy – in fact a huge sandhill was located on the western side of the Greens Road area, and the foundation trenches had to be dug very deep, to locate firm stone for the foundations. Stone was mostly quarried in the area: the stonemasons were free settlers who had worked on erection of the Customs House at what was then Semi-Circular Quay.

Once the soldiers and their families moved here, shopkeepers followed. Builders moved into the area and put up 3,800 houses between 1860 and 1890. These terraces give today's Paddington its air of individuality. The first school in the area was opened in the Presbyterian manse in Oxford Street, built in 1845.

It is hard to imagine that in 1822 the mansion Juniper Hall (the opposite southern corner of Oxford Street from the Reservoir site) stood alone, without the many neighbours it has today. Set in a flagged garden, it had attic windows that gave panoramic views to Rushcutters Bay and Botany Bay. Juniper Hall was built for Robert Cooper, distiller and emancipist merchant, who with partners James Underwood and Francis Ewen Forbes, had received 100 acres from Governor Brisbane in c.1818, covering the whole of north Paddington, and they agreed to erect 3 mansions and a distillery there. A distillery was built at the foot of Cascade Street near Taylor Square and Cooper bought out his partners, and only Juniper Hall was erected...The Coopers were part of the social scene of their day and entertained many notables of that time. After they left the house it was renamed Ormond House to dissociate itself from the gin image and passed through many hands, gradually becoming smothered by the building of small shops in front of the house. Latterly it has been restored by the National Trust and has had a variety of uses.

Today few of the area's original working class residents remain, as the suburb's proximity to the city has made it popular with business and professional people who prefer inner-city living in this historic area. The shopping centre, concentrated on the north side of Oxford Street, has also changed from one serving local needs to one of cafes, speciality shops and boutiques...Much of this is related to the changing population and the Village Bazaar, or Paddington Markets. The bazaar, which has operated since the mid 1970s, draws visitors from all over the city and has contributed to Paddington's development as one of Sydney's favourite tourist spots, along with Bondi Beach and The Rocks.

=== Postal services ===
The first official postal service in Australia was established in April 1809, when Sydney merchant Isaac Nichols was appointed as the first Postmaster in the colony of NSW. Prior to this, mail had been distributed directly by the captain of the ship on which the mail arrived; however, this system was neither reliable nor secure. In 1825 the colonial administration was empowered to establish a Postmaster General's Department, which had previously been administered from Britain.

In 1828 the first post offices outside of Sydney were established, with offices in Bathurst, Campbelltown, Parramatta, Liverpool, Newcastle, Penrith and Windsor. By 1839 there were forty post offices in the colony, with more opening as settlement spread. The advance of postal services was further increased as the railway network began to be established throughout NSW from the 1860s. Also, in 1863, the Postmaster General WH Christie noted that accommodation facilities for postmasters in some post offices was quite limited, and stated that it was a matter of importance that "post masters should reside and sleep under the same roof as the office".

The first post office in Paddington was established on 1 July 1851, while the first recorded postmaster, Richard Westaway, was appointed on 22 July 1857. In 1859 a letter carrier was appointed, with deliveries being made from the Sydney GPO on horseback each morning. In 1860 the Municipality of Woollahra was incorporated. The growth of the municipality led to petitioning for the construction of a post office from as early as 1860; with the inaugural Post and Telegraph Office operating out of rented premises. The current site on the corner of Oxford and Ormond Streets was secured on 27 February 1882; and plans drawn up during 1884 under the supervision of the New South Wales Colonial Architect James Barnet in the Victorian Italianate style and was officially opened on 26 December 1885. The building has been in continual operation as a post office since that time. The predominantly two-storey building is constructed of ashlar and smooth rendered bricks, with a three-storey stair tower and upper floor to the western end of the southern facade. It has a series of stepped skillion, modern sheet steel roofs that sit behind a stepped parapet wall that runs around the Oxford and Ormond Street facades. The building was used as a post and telegraph office and a residence for the postmaster.

The appointment of James Barnet as Acting Colonial Architect in 1862 coincided with a considerable increase in funding to the public works program. Between 1865 and 1890 the Colonial Architects Office was responsible for the building and maintenance of 169 post offices and telegraph offices in NSW. The post offices constructed during this period were designed in a variety of architectural styles, as Barnet argued that the local parliamentary representatives always preferred "different patterns".

The construction of new post offices continued throughout the Depression years under the leadership of Walter Liberty Vernon, who retained office from 1890 to 1911. While twenty-seven post offices were built between 1892 and 1895, funding to the Government Architect's Office was cut from 1893 to 1895, causing Vernon to postpone a number of projects. Repairs to the building were undertaken during 1890–91 and a telephone exchange was added in 1911-13. Vernon is also attributed in having designed the building, however, given the timeframe, it is likely that his contribution related to minor additions and alterations in the Victorian Free Classical style.

Following Federation in 1901, the Commonwealth Government took over responsibility for post, telegraph and telephone offices, with the Department of Home Affairs Works Division being made responsible for post office construction. In 1916 construction was transferred to the Department of Works and Railways, with the Department of the Interior responsible during World War II.

On 22 December 1975 the Postmaster General's Department was abolished and replaced by the Post and Telecommunications Department, with Telecom and Australia Post being created. In 1989, the Australian Postal Corporation Act established Australia Post as a self-funding entity, which heralded a new direction in property management, including a move towards smaller, shop-front style post offices away from the larger more traditional buildings.

For much of its history, the post office has been responsible for a wide variety of community services including mail distribution, as agencies for the Commonwealth Savings Bank, electoral enrolments, and the provision of telegraph and telephone services. The town post office served as a focal point for the community, most often built in a prominent position in the center of town close to other public buildings, creating a nucleus of civic buildings and community pride.

== Description ==
Paddington Post Office is a predominantly two-storey ashlar and smooth rendered brick building in the Victorian Italianate Style, with a three-storey stair tower and upper floor to the western end of the southern facade. It has a series of stepped skillion, modern sheet steel roofs that sit behind a stepped parapet wall that runs around the Oxford and Ormond Street facades. There are no chimneys visible on the roof.

Several additions appear to have been made to the original building, including the early two-storey former residence section, possibly original, fronting Ormond Street, and the c. 1979 single-storey extension to the north at the centre, housing the current loading dock and delivery area/mail room. Changes appear to have been extensive to the interior of the building, particularly to the first-floor mail sorting room, which is currently open plan showing evidence of wall fabric removal and infill of openings.

There is a ground floor colonnade to the southern facade with brown glazed tiled floor, cream painted original mini-orb iron soffit, ovolo cornice, exposed beams and heavy masonry elements including attached fluted columns and a rendered balustrade to the eastern of the three open bays. There is a brown tiled recessed side porch containing the post boxes enclosed by a lockable, grey painted wrought iron palisade fence and gate.

The colour scheme of the exterior is currently apricot painted render with cream painted opening surrounds, columns and pilasters. There is a large British Coat of Arms located to the centre of the Oxford Street facade parapet, resting upon a continuous dentilled entablature with dark trims. A separate, plain entablature with dark trim highlights the parapet of the two-storey Ormond Street addition. A continuous entablature with dark trim is also located at the first floor level to the southern original section of the building. The ashlar rendered ground floor facade features classical detailing with a heavy rendered masonry base. The addition to Ormond Street is smooth rendered, with little decoration.

Fenestration of Paddington Post Office is uniform and largely symmetrical to the southern facade. It has square four-pane windows to the first floor, a single upper and lower pane sash window to the second-floor tower and first-floor curved corner, and arched, single upper and lower pane sash windows to the ground-floor front section. Openings to the Ormond Street addition are symmetrical about the centre ground-floor doors, comprising single upper and lower pane squared windows to the first floor with projecting rendered sills, and squared windows and porch openings to the ground floor. The ground-floor interior comprises three main areas, including the large retail area to the southern side, mail room/delivery area behind to the north and staff facilities, consisting of individual offices to the north and west and a tiled modern bathroom to the northeastern corner.

Ceilings to the ground floor include plasterboard with a coved cornice to the mail room and offices and plaster to the stairwell and retail area, with moulded plaster cornices and an arch and ceiling rose to the stairwell entry. Air conditioning vents are located to the ceiling of the retail area, there is exposed ducting to the mail room and there are attached and suspended banks of fluorescent lights to the ground floor spaces. Flooring consists of carpeted and sheet vinyl.

Skirting is simple and largely non-original to this level, whereas some original architrave fabric is retained to the early doorways. The majority of internal doors to the ground floor have been removed, with two original four panel doors retained to the Postal Manager's office to the north and adjacent to the storage beneath the stair. The remaining doors are modern flush and modern security doors to the exterior. The entry from Ormond Street is recessed and has a fanlight and sidelights surrounding the door. Walls to the ground floor are a combination of grey painted rendered brick and recent, c. 1980s-90s fibre cement sheet partition walls enclosing the retail area. Fireplaces have been bricked in, and what appears to have been a former fireplace to the southern wall of the post boxes area has been infilled by post boxes.

The ground-floor stair hall to the eastern side has sheet vinyl flooring and treads with black edge strips. There is grey painted early timber panelling below the stair and the stair itself comprises a polished curved timber rail surmounting turned balusters and a turned bottom post. The first floor of Paddington Post Office contains the mail sorting and contractors spaces, lunchroom and staff facilities. The flooring is mainly sheet vinyl, however some carpeting is present in the large southern mail room and there is tiling to the modern bathrooms. The first-floor ceilings are mainly mini-orb, painted cream, with large circular perforated vents and an ovolo mould cornice. This is excepting the plasterboard ceilings with a coved cornice to the modern bathrooms and hall, flush plaster to the main stairwell and the small areas of pressed metal to the two small eastern storerooms with narrow coved cornices. Air conditioning ducting and vents are exposed to the first-floor ceilings, with some vents in walls. Lighting comprises single and banks of fluorescent lights.

Architraves appear to be largely original to original openings, especially to the southern section of the building. Skirting is plain, with some quad mould strip used and original remnants to the small store rooms, hall and main stairwell. There are some internal doors missing to the first floor, with modern doors to other openings. Later windows are to the rear facade and there is an original window retained to the internal western wall of the mail sorting and delivery space. Walls are grey painted rendered brick and asbestos cement or fibre cement sheet wall additions to the eastern side and hallway. Some original wall fabric has been removed, particularly from the western wall of the southern mail sorting and delivery space and from the western mail delivery/transfer room. The lunch room appears to retain the only evidence of a possible fireplace to the first floor.

There is a second stairwell to the southwestern corner tower section of the building, accessing the second floor. It has white painted square timber posts with turned tops, square balusters and straight rail. Treads are timber with some vinyl flooring and edge strips. Walls to this space have peeling paint and minor cracking and this area is currently used as a small office. The second-floor level comprises three rooms, and is currently used for storage. It has cream painted mini-orb ceilings with a coved cornice. There is no air conditioning ducting to this level and it is lit by single fluorescent tubes and a pendant light to the stairwell. Architraves to the second floor are simple and appear early and the skirting is plain.

Some doors have been removed and fanlights retained, with one four-panel door remaining at the top of the stair. The two northern end windows have been boarded over, as is the northernmost window of the middle store room and the upper sash of the top window to the stairwell. Walls to the second floor have large amounts of peeling paint and some cracking evident and there is a section of vertical timber boarding to the eastern wall of the southernmost room, below some multi-pane internal windows.

Signage to Paddington Post Office incorporates the "Post and Telegraph Office" lettering to the Oxford Street facade below the first-floor level entablature and "1885" to the curved corner section at the same level. Below the date, attached to the blind arched window, is a large, standard Australia Post sign. Paddington Post Office makes a valuable contribution to the civic presence of Oxford Street, complemented by and in harmony with the elaborate Town Hall to the south and Juniper Hall to the east. It is situated within a predominantly two to three-storey busy commercial/retail streetscape and dominates the adjoining early shopfronts to the west.

The only outbuilding to Paddington Post Office is the c. 1979 detached cycle shed located to the northwestern corner of the site in the concreted rear yard, and there is a projecting brick dock to the western boundary. Vegetation is limited to shared trees of the northern adjacent terrace house and yard, none actually being located within the site boundaries. There is also a small park opposite the building on Oxford Street, and the front gardens of Juniper Hall opposite on Ormond Street. There are standard street signs located at the front and sides of the building, along with modern street light pole and telephone pole to the eastern side.

=== Condition ===
As at 3 August 2000, Paddington Post Office appears to be in generally good condition. There is some archaeological potential for the site. While there have been a series of additions and alterations to Paddington Post Office, and the original form of the building is still apparent in remnant fabric, much of the remaining original interior fabric on the ground floor has been altered. The exterior is in very good condition and appears intact. The Post Office retains the features which make it culturally significant, including architectural details such as the classical front porch with fluted columns, central pediment, and parapeted roof, and its overall form, corner position and style.

=== Modifications and dates ===
The original building was completed in 1885 as a post and telegraph office, possibly comprising only the southern section of the building, with the Ormond Street section probably an early addition, if not original. Repairs were undertaken during 1890-91. It is not clear exactly what these entailed. The 1909 plans show that the "Switch Room" is located on the first floor. It is presumed that this room accommodated the Telephone Exchange when it was installed c. 1911-13.

After this time, it appears that many different changes occurred, including the removal of a first-floor balcony to the Ormond Street addition and the relocation of the posting boxes from the centre arched porch window to the eastern porch end. Further additions were made in 1979, which comprised the single-storey ground-floor mail room infill of part of the courtyard with mail "chute" to the first floor, the addition of the first-floor modern staff amenities and the rear cycle shed. By this time it is evident that the residence in the Ormond Street section had been converted to use by the Post Office and the northernmost addition of a kitchen, laundry and servants room had been demolished to create the current laneway. Rear stairs and walkways servicing all levels have been removed and the post boxes' recessed porch created with the removal of windows. The southwestern corner stair was also extensively modified, currently only servicing the first to second floors. There is a c. 1990s standard Australia Post fitout to the retail area and grey colour scheme.

=== Further information ===
Some notable features of the building include the classically designed arch over the base of the ground floor main stair, and the original or early timber and etched glass entry doors to the retail area in very good condition. There is an original or early clock located over the centre window of the southern facade porch and a later mail "chute", now disused, retained in the ceiling of the ground-floor mail room. An intrusive element to Paddington Post Office is the exposed air conditioning ducting to some ground and first-floor interior spaces. Evidence of earlier uses of the site, particularly within the open concreted space to the north of the building. Paddington Post Office appears to be in generally good condition, excepting the poor condition of some interior finishes, including peeling paint and minor cracking to the first and second floor, and general wear and tear to all floors. There is some archaeological potential of the site regarding former structures and evidence of earlier uses of the site, particularly within the open concreted space to the north of the building.

== Heritage listings ==
On 22 December 2000 the post office building was listed on the New South Wales State Heritage Register with the following statement of significance:

Paddington Post Office is significant at a State level for its historical associations, strong aesthetic qualities and social value.

Paddington Post Office is associated with the early development of the area, as it is linked with the original postal services established in 1851. Paddington Post Office is historically significant because it is associated with the development of communications services in the Paddington area during the late nineteenth century, as the rapidly growing population required improved services. Paddington Post Office reflects the building boom of the late Victorian period in Paddington. The building is also associated with the pattern of subdivision and development of the Paddington area.

Paddington Post Office is also historically significant because it is associated with the NSW Colonial Architect’s Office under James Barnet, which designed and maintained a number of post offices across NSW between 1865 and 1890. The building is part of an important group of works by James Barnet’s Office in the Victorian Italianate Style, of which Barnet was a key practitioner.

Paddington Post Office is aesthetically significant because it is a distinctive example of the Victorian Italianate style, with strong visual appeal. It is located on a prominent corner site and makes a significant contribution to the streetscape of the Paddington civic precinct, and, along with the Town Hall, defines Paddington as a Victorian period suburb.

Paddington Post Office is also considered to be significant to the community of Paddington’s sense of place.

— Statement of significance, New South Wales State Heritage Register.

On 8 November 2011, the building was added to the Australian Commonwealth Heritage List with the following statement of significance:

Typologically, Paddington Post Office of 1885 is relatively intact externally, notwithstanding a programme of changes over the years. Internally it is heavily altered in parts, but elsewhere internally it is fairly intact. Overall, the building retains an ability to demonstrate aspects of its original function and layout, with the former residence component to Ormond Street being particularly readable in the context of the site. Architecturally and stylistically, elements of note include the tower base in the west bay (without the tower) fronting Oxford Street; the unusually complex composition of the Oxford Street frontage for a medium sized suburban post office; the open-bed pediment ‘driven’ by an extruded voussoir below the intended tower layers which was unusual at this time, being more associated with 1900s Baroque revivalism as seen at Ipswich in Queensland; and the elevated entrance in a three-bay recessed arcade (loggia) fronted by four columns in antis, flanked by a rusticated ground floor wall framed with pilasters. Compositionally, the west (tower) bay is successfully balanced by the curving bay at the opposite end, with the two elements connected by the first floor bracketed cornice and superimposed parapet that runs across the building and round the corner into the two-bay Ormond Street frontage. The former quarters to the rear on Ormond Street, believed to be contemporary with the main post office building has a divergent character, plainer façade and is at a substantially different scale and grain from the public component of the post office. This is an unusual treatment and also rare in Barnet’s work to have this degree of elevational variance in a single building. Paddington Post Office is an important contributor to the Victorian character of Paddington and this area of Oxford Street. The building is also aesthetically interesting on a number of levels – it is considered to be one of James Barnet’s more eclectic designs, bringing a series of his other genres together and introducing some oddities. The attached quarters read as quite a different building; the frontage to Oxford Street is centred but technically asymmetrical. Other unusual details include the widely spaced dentil brackets and the spur entablatures suggested in the ground floor frieze. The base performs a rare variety of roles, changing from a base into a stair screen across the loggia and a rusticated pedestal-fragment at the main entrance. The rounded and rusticated cornering is also distinctive in this suburban context. The curtilage includes the title block/allotment of the property. The significant components of Paddington Post Office include the 1885 postal building and former quarters. The loading dock, delivery area and bicycle shed to the rear are not significant. While the pair of historic two-storey terrace dwellings with cantilevered balconies (located to the north of the post office) appear to be on title, these have not been investigated in details and no assessment of their significance is made.

— Statement of significance, Commonwealth Heritage List.

== See also ==
- Australian non-residential architectural styles
- List of post offices in New South Wales
