= James Comrie (politician) =

Australian politician and philanthropist

James Comrie 1816-1902 was an Australian politician and philanthropist.

James Comrie was born in Edinburgh, Scotland in May 1816 and arrived in Sydney in June 1843 and worked as a general merchant at Moore's Wharf, Millers Point. In October 1847 he married Sophia Russell the wealthy widow of Phillip Russell. His primary interests were the Christian Faith and books. It was his chief hobby to buy books and give them away which led him to be dubbed a 'literary philanthropist'. He was a pastoralist who owned extensive land in partnership with Jeremiah Rundle. From 1856 to 1861 he was a member of the New South Wales Legislative Council. He was a significant philanthropist being involved with the Bible Society, Religious Tract Society, YMCA and the Sydney Female Refuge. By the 1860s he had retired from public life and was living at Northfields, Kurrajong Heights, he died in 1902 and was buried at Rookwood.
