= Children's Court Clinic =

Medical and legal clinic in New South Wales, Australia

- Jurisdiction: New South Wales Australia
- Location: Parramatta and Broadmeadow
- Authorised by: Parliament of New South Wales via the Children’s Court Act 1987 (NSW) and the Children and Young Persons (Care and Protection) Act 1998 (NSW)
- Website: www.schn.health.nsw.gov.au

Director of the Children’s Court Clinic

The Children's Court Clinic in New South Wales, part of the Sydney Children's Hospitals Network, is a medico-legal clinic established pursuant to Section 15B of the Children’s Court Act 1987 (NSW) and the Children and Young Persons (Care and Protection) Act 1998 (NSW) which prepares independent reports on children for legal proceedings before the Children's Court of New South Wales.

== Constitution ==
The clinic is established under the Children's Court Act 1987 (NSW) and its function is further specified according to sections 52-59 of the Children and Young Persons (Care and Protection) Act 1998 (NSW). As of 1 July 2011 the Minister for Health was required to establish the clinic in accordance with the Children's Court Rule 2000 (NSW).

An assessment report by the clinic is taken to be an independent report to the Court rather than evidence tendered by a party (section 59, the Care and Protection Act). The Children’s Court Clinic authorised clinician who prepares a report is nevertheless available to the court for cross-examination. Under the Court's rules, the clinic is composed of the Director of the Children’s Court Clinic and any other persons appointed by the Attorney General. Those other persons are persons considered by the Attorney General to be suitable to prepare and submit assessment reports for the court. This is in the process of changing as the clinic is gradually transferred to the Sydney Children's Hospitals Network.

The clinic currently employs a team of senior psychologists based in Parramatta and Broadmeadow NSW to do its work. It also has a list of authorised clinicians who perform work on a contractual basis. They are experienced clinicians in psychiatry, psychology or social work.

== Jurisdiction ==
The clinic is required to make clinical assessments of children and families in care matters and report to the Children's Court on those assessments. The report is given to the court ordering the assessment, which then determines whether to release it to the parties in the case.

== Location ==
The clinic has two locations in New South Wales; in Parramatta, Sydney and in Broadmeadow, Newcastle.

== See also ==
- Children's Court of New South Wales
- List of New South Wales courts and tribunals
