= Risk factor (criminology) =

Concept in criminology

Risk factor research has proliferated within the discipline of criminology in recent years, based largely on the early work of Sheldon and Eleanor Glueck in the US and David Farrington in the UK. The identification of risk factors that are allegedly predictive of offending and reoffending (especially by young people) has heavily influenced the criminal justice policies and practices of a number of first world countries, notably the UK, the USA and Australia.

== Criticism ==
The robustness and validity of much 'artefactual' risk factor research (see Kemshall 2003) has recently come under sustained criticism for:

- reductionism: oversimplifying complex experiences and circumstances by converting them to simple quantities, limiting investigation of risk factors to psychological and immediate social domains of life, whilst neglecting socio-structural influences;
- determinism: characterising young people as passive victims of risk experiences with no ability to construct, negotiate or resist risk; and
- imputation: assuming that risk factors and definitions of offending are homogeneous across countries and cultures, assuming that statistical correlations between risk factors and offending actually represent causal relationships, assuming that risk factors apply to individuals on the basis of aggregated data.

Two UK academics, Stephen Case and Kevin Haines, have been particularly forceful in their critique of risk factor research within a number of academic papers and a comprehensive polemic text entitled 'Understanding Youth Offending: Risk Factor Research, Policy and Practice'.
