= Paddington Town Hall =

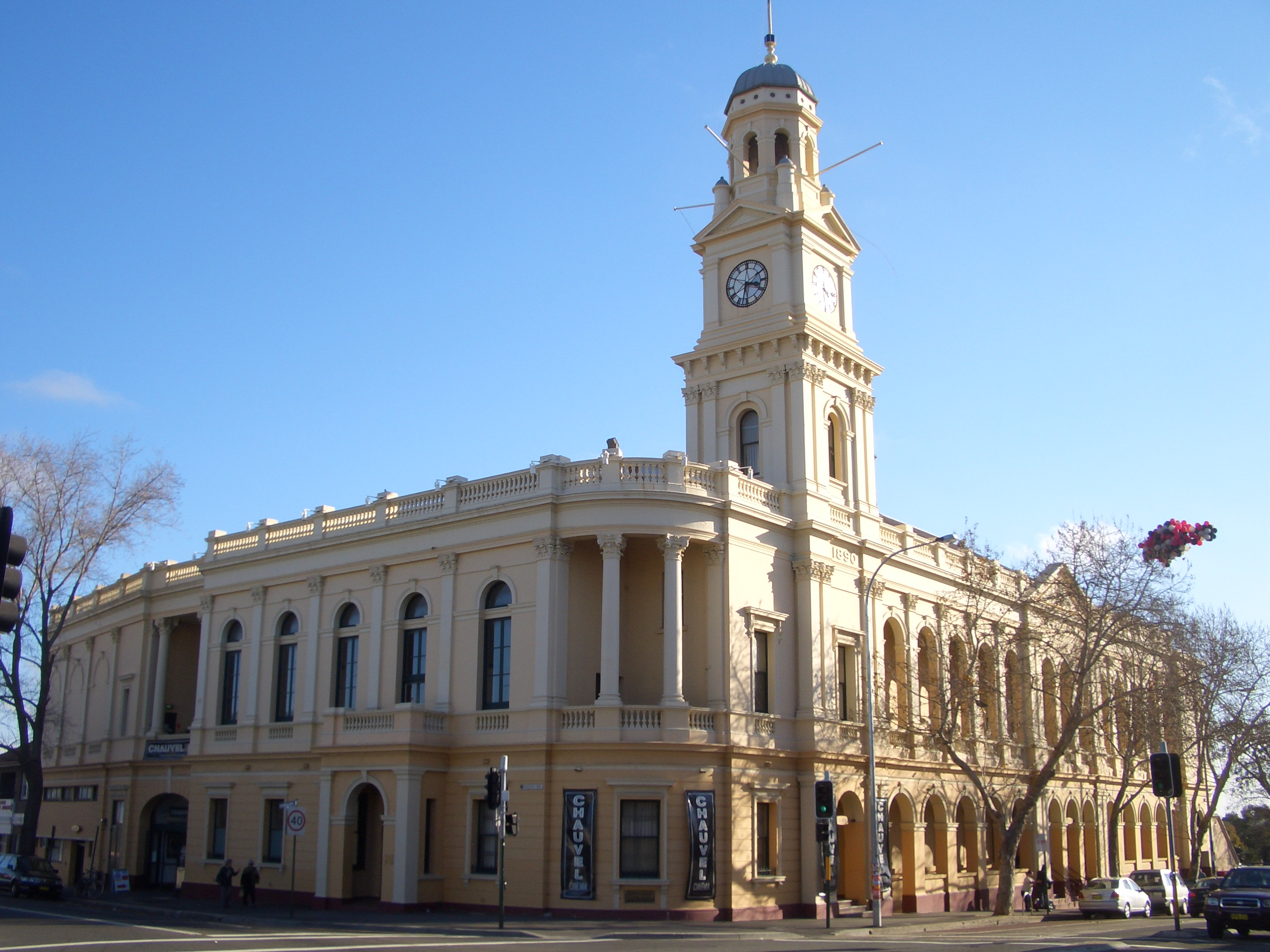
- Paddington Town Hall

- Location within inner Sydney

General information
- Type: Town hall
- Architectural style: Victorian Free Classical
- Location: 249 Oxford Street, Paddington, Sydney, New South Wales, Australia
- Coordinates: 33°53′06″S 151°13′33″E
- Current tenants: Chauvel Cinema; Community radio; Public library; Venue hire
- Construction started: 8 November 1890
- Completed: 1891
- Opened: 3 October 1891
- Renovated: August 1905
- Client: Municipality of Paddington
- Owner: City of Sydney

Height
- Tip: 32-metre (105 ft) clock tower

Design and construction
- Architect: John Edward Kemp
- Main contractor: R. Steele

Website
- cityofsydney.nsw.gov.au

New South Wales Heritage Register
- Official name: Paddington Town Hall; Town Hall
- Type: State heritage (built)
- Criteria: a., c., d.
- Designated: 2 April 1999
- Reference no.: 561
- Type: Town Hall
- Category: Community Facilities

The Paddington Town Hall is a heritage-listed former town hall building located at 249 Oxford Street in the inner eastern Sydney suburb of Paddington, in the City of Sydney local government area of New South Wales, Australia. Sir Henry Parkes laid its foundation stone in 1890 when Paddington was a separate municipality. It was designed by John Edward Kemp and built from 1890 to 1891, and remains a distinctive example of Victorian architecture in Sydney. The clock tower, completed in 1905, is 32 metres (105 ft) high and is a prominent landmark on the ridge of Oxford Street. It is also known as Town Hall and was added to the New South Wales State Heritage Register on 2 April 1999.

== History ==
=== History of the area ===
This suburb, which took its name from the London borough, lies in what were once paddocks adjacent to Victoria Barracks. It was the first of the early Sydney suburbs that was not self-sufficient – its inhabitants, unlike those of Balmain or Newtown, where work was available in local industries, had to go away each day to their places of employment. Development of the eastern suburbs of Edgecliff, Double Bay, Point Piper and Woollahra surrounded this area with wealthy people's homes so this small hilly suburb lost all hope of harbour views.

The area developed after a road was constructed to link up with a pilot station that was to be built at Watsons Bay (Old South Head Road). John Palmer, the settlement's commissary, refused to allow people to cross his land grant ('Woolloomooloo'), so the road had to follow a roundabout way through Paddington to bypass his 40 hectares (100 acres). Only a handful of workers lived in the area, and it was not until 1838, when it was decided to build a new military barracks in Paddington, that life came to the area.

From 1848 when Victoria Barracks had been opened (designed by Lt.-Col. George Barney) and homes for the soldiers and their families had been erected, Paddington began to assume a real identity...The (barracks site) land was sandy - in fact a huge sandhill was located on the western side of the Greens Road area, and the foundation trenches had to be dug very deep, to locate firm stone for the foundations. Stone was mostly quarried in the area: the stonemasons were free settlers who had worked on erection of the Customs House at what was then Semi-Circular Quay.

Once the soldiers and their families moved here, shopkeepers followed. Builders moved into the area and put up 3,800 houses between 1860 and 1890. These terraces give today's Paddington its air of individuality. The first school in the area was opened in the Presbyterian manse in Oxford Street, built in 1845.

It is hard to imagine that in 1822 the mansion Juniper Hall (the opposite southern corner of Oxford Street from the Reservoir site) stood alone, without the many neighbours it has today. Set in a flagged garden, it had attic windows that gave panoramic views to Rushcutters Bay and Botany Bay. Juniper Hall was built for Robert Cooper, distiller and emancipist merchant, who with partners James Underwood and Francis Ewen Forbes, had received 40 hectares (100 acres) from Governor Brisbane in c. 1818, covering the whole of north Paddington, and they agreed to erect three mansions and a distillery there. A distillery was built at the foot of Cascade Street near Taylor Square and Cooper bought out his partners, and only Juniper Hall was erected. The Coopers were part of the social scene of their day and entertained many notables of that time. After they left the house it was renamed Ormond House to dissociate itself from the gin image and passed through many hands, gradually becoming smothered by the building of small shops in front of the house. Latterly it has been restored by the National Trust and has had a variety of uses.

Today few of the area's original working class residents remain, as the suburb's proximity to the city has made it popular with business and professional people who prefer inner-city living in this historic area. The shopping centre, concentrated on the north side of Oxford Street, has also changed from one serving local needs to one of cafes, speciality shops and boutiques. Much of this is related to the changing population and the Village Bazaar, or Paddington Markets. The bazaar, which has operated since the mid-1970s, draws visitors from all over the city and has contributed to Paddington's development as one of Sydney's favourite tourist spots, along with Bondi Beach and The Rocks.

=== Paddington Council ===
The residents of Paddington raised a petition of 172 signatures in September 1859 requesting incorporation as a district. The proposed boundary was the Sydney Common to the south and New South Head Road to the north. The area was said to include 1,000 houses with 3,000 residents.

The Council held their first meeting on 25 May 1860 with nine councillors and a chairman. The first three meetings were held in the Paddington Inn before Council resolved to rent Mr. Logan's house next door for 12 months at 15 shillings a week. Meetings continued to be held at the house until the first Town Hall was built on the current site of the Royal Women's Hospital in Oxford Street in 1866.

With a budget of £2000 the Council concentrated on maintaining roads, including kerbing and guttering, and erecting gas lamps. By 1867 Paddington had sufficient population to be elevated to a Borough and the Chairman became a Mayor. Paddington continued to prosper and in 1890 was receiving revenue second only to Balmain Council.

Fifty years from its inception, in 1909, the population had risen to 26,000 in 4,800 houses and expenditure was at £21,000. During the 1890s depression and difficult years of the early 20th century Paddington declined and was characterised as a slum. In 1949 Paddington Council was subsumed by the City of Sydney. The last remnants of Paddington Council were removed in 1967 when the original boundary was divided between the Municipality of Woollahra and the City of Sydney.

=== Paddington Town Hall ===
Aspiring Town Clerk C. Hellmrich obtained the land for the Paddington Town Hall and argued for a new Hall on the site. The design was the subject of an international architectural competition with thirty submissions. Although a design specification was that the building could be constructed for 9000 pounds, none of the submissions were likely to meet this criterion. John Edward Kemp was the winner with an Italian Renaissance style building. Tenders confirmed that the scheme could not be built for 9000 pounds and estimates instead stood at 13,500 pounds. A loan was obtained from an overseas institution to allow construction.

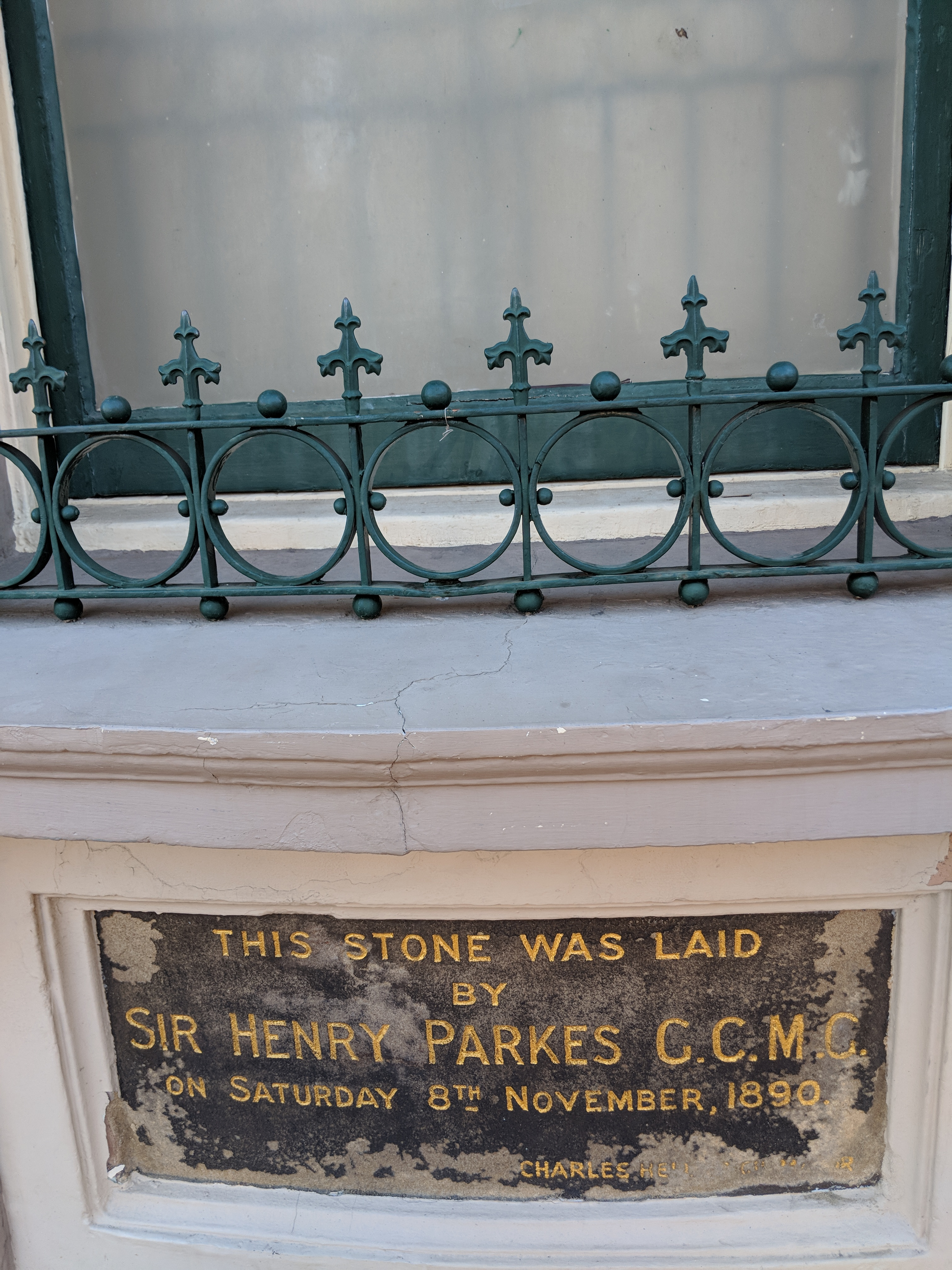
The foundation stone laid by Sir Henry Parkes

Situated at the highest point on the Oxford Street ridge, the town hall's foundation stone was laid on 8 November 1890 by Sir Henry Parkes and was opened with great fanfare on 3 October 1891 by the Governor, The Earl of Jersey. The first major alteration to the Town Hall occurred in 1904–1905, when the clock tower was erected in commemoration of the coronation of King Edward VII. The face of the clock is inscribed with "Edwardus VII". The honour to King Edward was that Paddington was, at the time, a large town hall, second only to Sydney.

The Town Hall varied slightly from the majority of town halls in that it was intended from the beginning to generate income from the hiring of the supper and ball room for balls, dances, concerts and public ceremonies. Again, Paddington was second only to Sydney in its importance and capacity, seating 1000 people. The Town Hall included specifically designed lodge rooms for the Paddington Ionic Masonic Lodge, which Council leased to them until 1918, when a rent raise caused the Lodge to vacate their room.

Paddington Town Hall was the site of a meeting of Rugby League players in 1908, at which the Eastern Suburbs Rugby League club, now the Sydney Roosters, was officially formed. On 10 September 1969, the congress of the Australian Council of Trade Unions (ACTU) was held at the town hall, with Bob Hawke being elected as the new president.

The original design also included a library. During 50th celebrations the Council boasted that the library was the best free library outside of Sydney. The collection contained 4000 books, the reading room could seat 30 people and, in comparison to other libraries, was well used. The library was relocated in 1977 from Oatley Road to beneath the Main Hall on Oxford Street as part of a financial package to reinvigorate the Town Hall.

The City of Sydney, the Australia Council and the Australian Film Commission provided $500,000 to redevelop the Town Hall as a centre that included an exhibition space, restaurant and an adjacent cinema. The building now houses radio studios, Paddington Library, and is a venue for private functions. The Chauvel Cinema (part of the Palace Films and Cinemas chain) has been operating in the Town Hall since 1977, inside the former Town Hall ballroom (the original floor and ceiling were retained).

== Description ==
=== External description ===
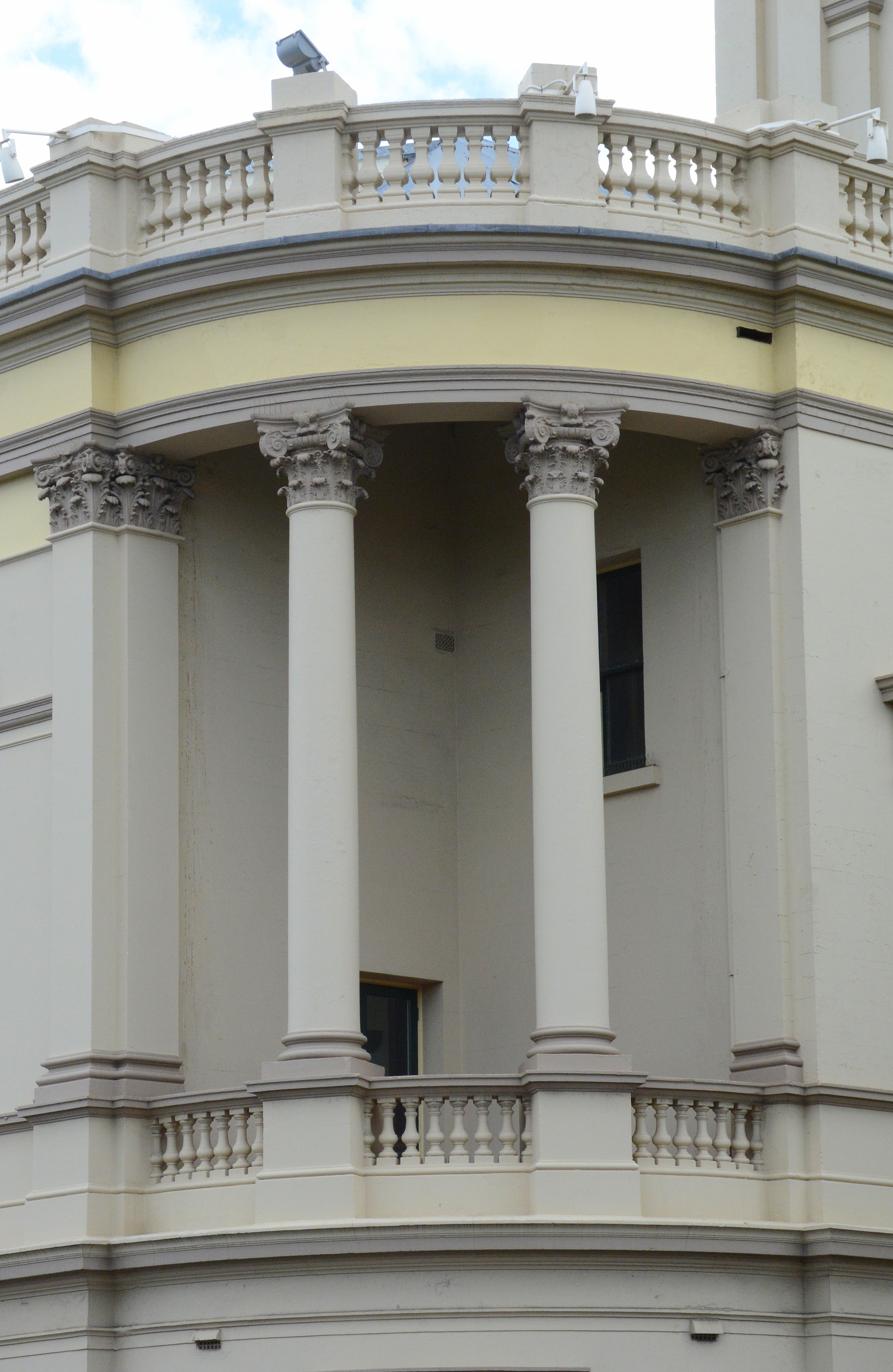
Corinthian pilasters

The Paddington Town Hall is two storeys, built of brick and finished with render. The overall architectural style is Victorian Free Classical. The principle decorative elements are "an open colonnade to Oxford Street and rows of Roman-arched first-floor windows flanked by Corinthian pilasters and a balustered parapet".

The main entrance was once off Oxford Street and is marked by a projected pediment and parapet (removed). Oxford Street is the more ornate of the two facades reflecting its more prominent position.

The clock tower is located on the corner of Oxford Street and Oatley Road. As with the facades, the main decorative form is Corinthian pilasters, pairs of which support the clock. Doric columns and a pediment frame the clock. The tower is finished with a dome supported by an octagonal drum.

The Oxford Street facade is slightly different to the Oatley Road face. On Oatley Street the windows are spaced further apart and the ground level lacks the colonnades. The southern end of the facade is a later addition, its arched entry and open balcony closely match the original section. The southern end was further modified with the construction of the cinema in 1977, when the first floor windows were blocked off. Unsympathetic modifications were made to the ground floor in 1951.

==== Clock tower ====
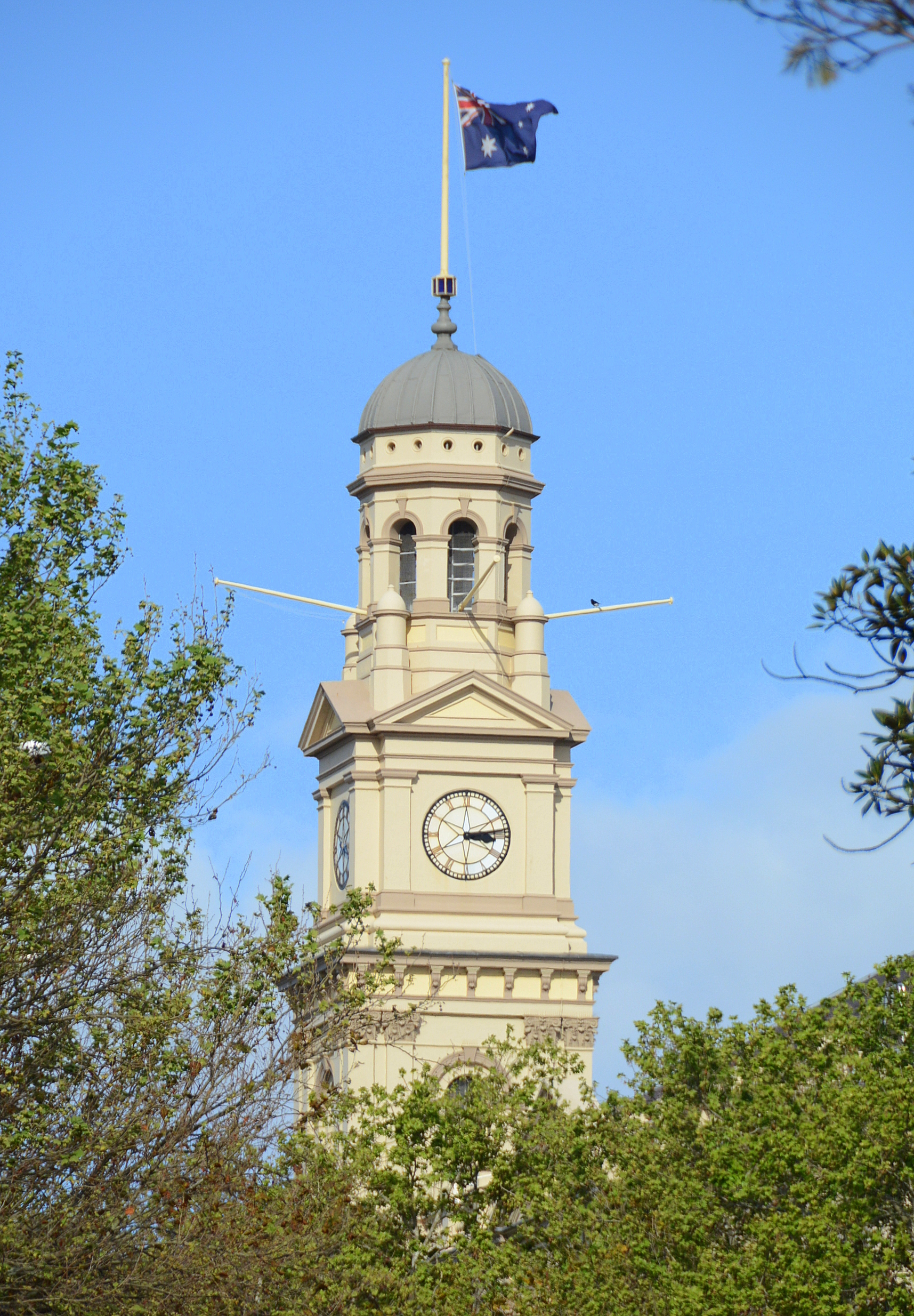
Clock tower

The Town Hall has a 32-metre (105 ft) high clock tower, completed in 1905 to commemorate the coronation of Edward VII, that dominates the Paddington skyline.

Whilst the eastern, southern, and western faces of the clock display the conventional Roman clock-face numerals, the Roman numerals on the northern (Oxford Street) side of the clock have been replaced as follows: 1:D, 2:U, 3:S, 4:T, 5:H, 6:E, 7:VII, 8:E, 9:D, 10:V, 11:A, 12:R. This was done to celebrate the coronation of King Edward VII; and, commencing at where the VIII ought to be, the northern clock-face reads E.D.V.A.R.D.U.S. T.H.E. VII.

The clock was officially set in motion on 30 August 1905, by Joseph Carruthers, the Premier of New South Wales, who noted that he "thought that the day on which peace had been declared between Russia and Japan was a fitting time to set it in motion" and that "he hoped there would be peace and goodwill on earth as long as the clock continued to go".

=== Internal description ===
The main vestibule can be entered from both Oxford Street and Oatley Road and the internal decoration continues to utilise ornamented archways to harmonise with the exterior. The ceiling is of pressed metal, while the floor of ceramic tiles is arranged in a geometric star pattern. The Main Hall is located on the first floor. The hall was significantly altered in 1933–1934 and re-decorated in an Art Deco style. The coffered ceiling was retained, but much of the original plasterwork has been removed - replaced with open grille work matching those cut in the wall. The walls are punctuated with projecting cylindrical plaster columns, capped with floral capitals.

Extending north of the hall is a narrow hall-like space that was originally an open loggia defined by Corinthian piers. Hall No. 2 has been converted into a cinema, destroying much of the interior space. The ante-chamber to the hall has been removed to create the cinema foyer.

The ground floor on Oxford Street was originally the council offices and the Council Chambers, but is now a library. The entry remains reasonably intact, with similar details to the principle entrance. Conversion into a library significantly altered the layout with the insertion of unsympathetic arches to allow access.

Summarised from Gazzard Sheldon 1991:7-8.

=== Modifications and dates ===
- 1904 Clock Tower added.
- 1927 Western extension and also possibly to south.
- 1928 Hall redecorated
- 1933 Major renovations to Main Hall with introduction of Art Deco style
- 1976 Library moved from Oatley Road entrance to Oxford Street
- 1977 Major renovations to construct cinema, video and radio facilities.

== Heritage listing ==
The Paddington Town Hall is of State significance as a landmark example of the Victorian Free Classical architectural style. Located in a prominent location, the Town Hall is highly visible and, as a well maintained building, an aesthetically pleasing structure. The Town Hall's construction in 1891 marked the beginning of the 1890s depression as is historically significant as one of the last public buildings to be built in the style.

Paddington Town Hall was listed on the New South Wales State Heritage Register on 2 April 1999 having satisfied the following criteria.

The place is important in demonstrating the course, or pattern, of cultural or natural history in New South Wales.

Paddington Town Hall is of State significance as one of the last public buildings constructed before the onset of the 1890s depression. The Town Hall marks the end of a historical phase of growth, prosperity and optimism in New South Wales.

Paddington Town Hall is of State significance as evidence of the historical significance Paddington once held, being the second largest council in revenue the Council constructed the second largest town hall.

The place is important in demonstrating aesthetic characteristics and/or a high degree of creative or technical achievement in New South Wales.

The Paddington Town Hall is of State significance as one of the last Victorian Free Classical public buildings and as such it exemplifies the architectural style. The Town Hall is aesthetically significant as it is situated in a prominent location and is visible from the city and surrounding suburbs.

The place has a strong or special association with a particular community or cultural group in New South Wales for social, cultural or spiritual reasons.

The Paddington Town Hall is of local significance as the focus of community activity in the area through the location of library and other services in the building.

== See also ==
- List of town halls in Sydney
- Architecture of Sydney
