= Children's Court of New South Wales =

Court within the Australian court hierarchy

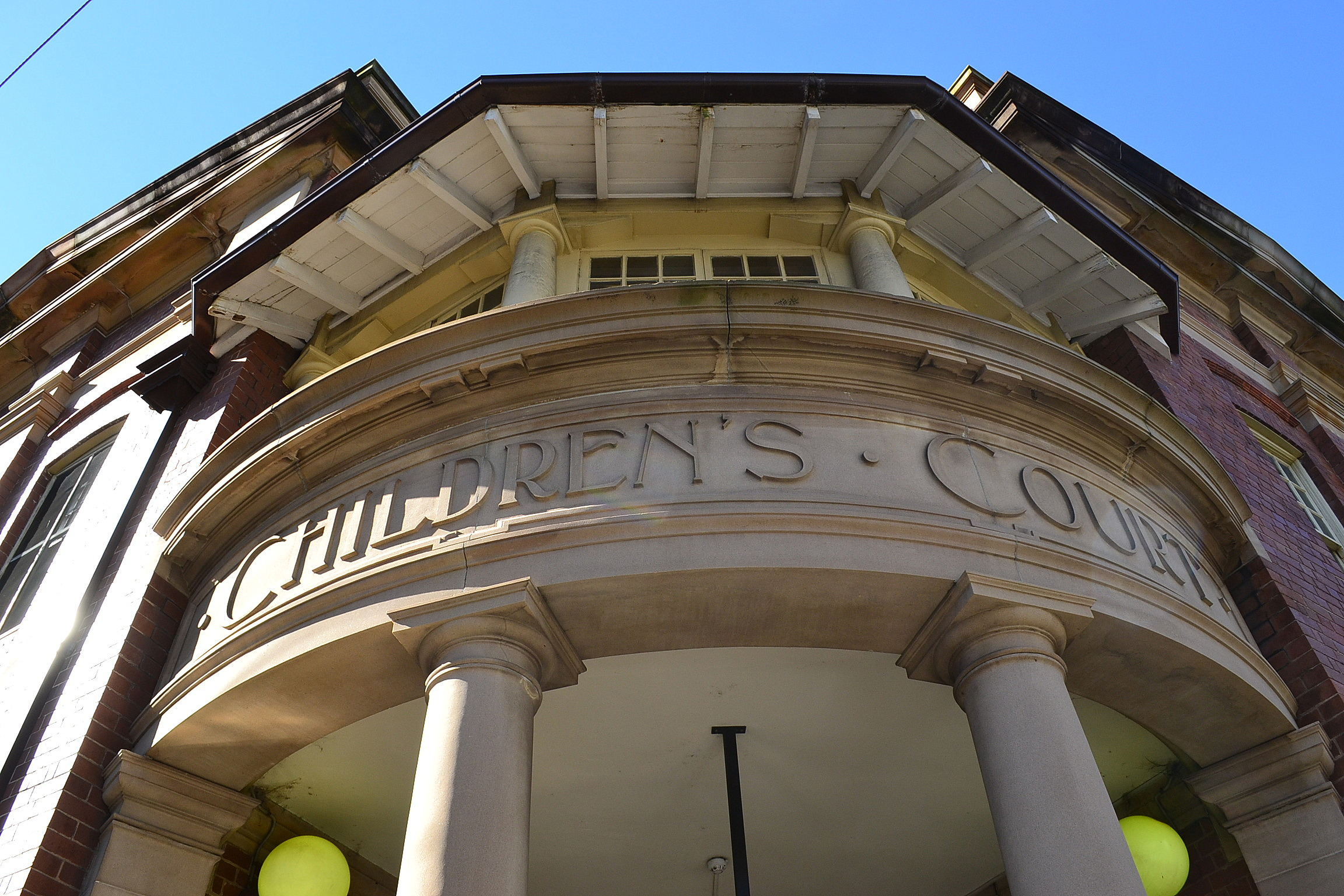
- The former Children's Court façade in Surry Hills
- Established: 1905
- Jurisdiction: New South Wales, Australia
- Location: Parramatta Justice Precinct, Parramatta, Sydney
- Authorised by: Parliament of New South Wales via the Children's Court Act 1987 (NSW)
- Website: childrenscourt.nsw.gov.au

President of the Children's Court
- Currently: Judge Ellen Skinner
- Since: November 2021

The Children's Court of New South Wales is a court within the Australian court hierarchy established in 1905. The current iteration was established on 18 January 1988 pursuant to the Children's Court Act 1987 (NSW) which deals with criminal offences committed by children aged over 10 years and under 18 years, as well as with proceedings relating to the care and protection of children. The court is located in the Parramatta Justice Precinct.

== History ==
The treatment of juvenile offenders in the colony of New South Wales reflected the system of criminal law inherited from the United Kingdom. The law of Australia at that time was heavily influenced by the social norms of English society. As a result, children criminals were treated no differently from adult criminals. They were liable to the same harsh penalties. The Judicial Commission of New South Wales cited an example of one English judge who, after condemning a 10-year-old boy to death, described the boy as "a proper subject for capital punishment". The Commission also noted that on one day in 1815, five children aged between eight and 12 years were hanged for petty larceny in England.

The first children's court was established under the Neglected Children and Juvenile Offenders Act 1905. The Judicial Commission of New South Wales stated the first court was set up in the spirit of parens patriae, a jurisdiction that was exercised by the superior courts of the United Kingdom and as a consequence, of the Supreme Court of New South Wales. The court was set up in light of the widespread poverty and child neglect at that time. The courts had to assume the role of parent, protector, and ultimate punisher. The main court began sitting at Ormond House until 1911 when it moved to Albion Street, Surry Hills, and became known as the Metropolitan Children's Court. on 29 April 1983 the court moved to Bidura House, during which time it was known as the Bidura Children's Court; the building gradually fell into disuse as a court until its closure in 2017. Most of its functions were moved to a purpose-built facility as part of the Parramatta Justice Precinct in 2006.

The present children's court is constituted under the Children's Court Act 1987 (NSW). The Court is an inferior court and is effectively a court of record. The court was established on 18 January 1988.

== Composition ==
The court is composed of magistrates of the Local Court of New South Wales who are appointed by the Chief Magistrate of the Local Court of New South Wales. A magistrate so appointed is called a Children's Magistrate. The Governor appoints a qualified person to be the President of the Children's Court. Any judge of the District Court is a qualified person and may be appointed as the President of the Children's Court for a duration not exceeding 5 years. After the expiry of the initial term of the appointed, the Governor may re-appoint the same person for another term, or to appoint another judge of the District Court as the President of the Children's Court. It is significant that the orders (other than interim orders) made by the President may be appealed to the Supreme Court, while orders made by the Children's Magistrate may be appealed to the District Court only. The President of the Children's Court administers the court, arranges sittings of the Court, and convenes meetings of Children's Magistrates. The President of the Children's Court also confers regularly with community groups and social agencies on matters involving children and the Court.

== Jurisdiction ==
The court exercises criminal jurisdiction under the Children (Criminal Proceedings) Act 1987. The court exercises care jurisdiction under the Children and Young Persons (Care and Protection) Act 1998. Until its repeal in 1998, the Children (Care and Protection) Act 1987 also covered the operations of the Court.

== Notable magistrates ==
- Rod Blackmore
- Barbara Holborow
- Mary Jerram

== See also ==
- Children's Court Clinic
- List of New South Wales courts and tribunals
