= Youth Justice (journal) =

- Discipline: Criminology
- Language: English
- Edited by: Barry Goldson, John Muncie

Publication details
- History: 2001–present
- Publisher: SAGE Publications
- Frequency: Triannually

Standard abbreviations
- ISO 4: Youth Justice

Indexing
- ISSN: 1473-2254 (print); 1747-6283 (web)
- LCCN: 2006207273
- OCLC no.: 54008448

Links
- Journal homepage; Online access; Online archive

Youth Justice is a triannual peer-reviewed academic journal covering analyses of juvenile/youth justice systems, law, policy, and practice. The journal's editors-in-chief are Barry Goldson (University of Liverpool) and John Muncie (The Open University). It was established in 2001 and is currently published by SAGE Publications.

== Abstracting and indexing ==
Youth Justice is abstracted and indexed in Scopus, SocINDEX, and Sociological Abstracts.
