= Children and Young Persons (Care and Protection) Act 1998 =

New South Wales law

The Children and Young Persons (Care and Protection) Act 1998 is a law in New South Wales that relates to the guardianship and care of children and young people.

The Reportable Conduct Scheme is operated under this act. The Reportable Conduct Scheme is to help ensure employers respond appropriately to allegations against employees in schools and industries working with children.

== See also ==
- Children's Court of New South Wales
