= Parramatta Square =

Public space in Sydney, Australia

- Public square
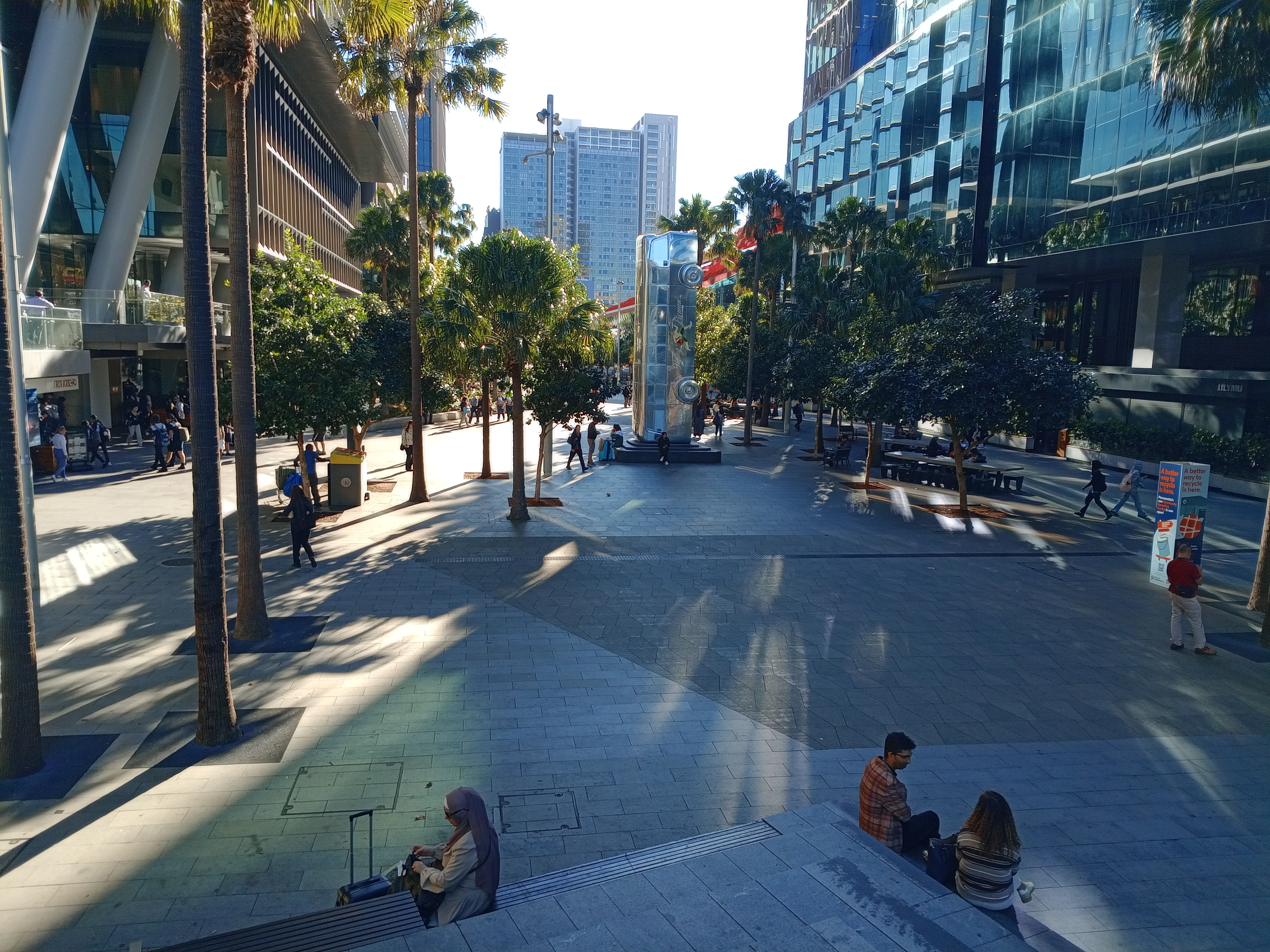
- The eastern end of Parramatta Square, facing west
- Opened: 2022
- Owner: City of Parramatta
- Location: Darcy and Macquarie Streets, Parramatta, Sydney, New South Wales, Australia
- Public transit: Parramatta Square; Parramatta railway station
- Interactive map of Parramatta Square
- Coordinates: 33.81622°S 151.00448°E

Parramatta Square is a public space located in Parramatta in Western Sydney, New South Wales, Australia. It is located between Darcy and Macquarie Streets. Opened in 2022, it has many connections with public transport from the bus interchange, train station, light rail and future metro station.

It is host to a number of buildings and cultural centres, including the town hall, PHIVE library and civic centre along with various retail and dining options. Parramatta Square also hosts many businesses.

The Westfield shopping centre is also accessible through the nearby train station.

== Transport ==
Parramatta Square is accessible via frequent light rail, train, bus and ferry services.

Parramatta will receive a metro station adjacent to the square as part of the Metro West project and can be seen to the right of the nearby light rail stop.

== Developments ==
3 Parramatta Square is host to NAB (National Australia Bank) offices in Parramatta and contains a connection between 4 and 6 & 8 Parramatta Square. 3, 4 and 6 & 8 Parramatta Square have all achieved a six green star ratings for their interiors and as built, these developments constitute three hectares of space.

PHIVE is located at 5 Parramatta Square and includes a civic centre that plays host to events with various facilities available such as the council chambers. The building's red roof is intended to mimic the local flora.

Parramatta Square is home to multiple commercial buildings such as the 55-storey 6 & 8 Parramatta Square which houses Property and Development NSW and has the largest net lettable area of any commercial building in Australia.

== History ==
The Burramattagal, a clan of the Dharug nation, are the traditional custodians of the land.

The foundation stone of St John's Cathedral in Parramatta was placed at the western end of the precinct in 1797 which made it the oldest place of Christian worship in New South Wales. The railway station opened in 1860. The town hall building was completed in 1883.

The inaugural building to be constructed in Parramatta Square was opened in 2009.

Parramatta Square was officially opened in 2022 after being developed by Walker. The City of Parramatta council currently manages the precinct and Walker manages the office towers.

In May 2024, ABC Radio Sydney started broadcasting from Parramatta Square. In December 2024, 7 pm ABC News bulletins started being broadcast from the new Parramatta studios followed by the news channel in February 2025.

== See also ==
- Centenary Square, Parramatta
- Prince Alfred Square, Parramatta
- Martin Place – Pedestrian mall in Sydney, Australia
