= PHIVE =

Cultural centre in Sydney, Australia

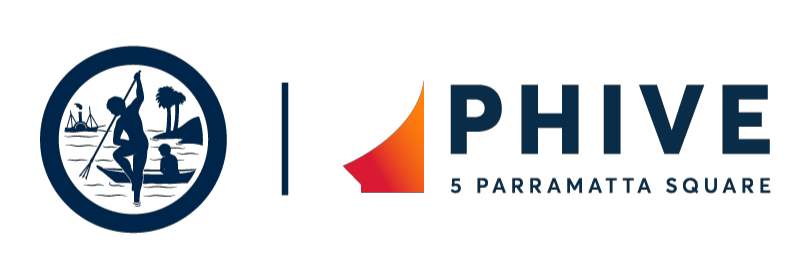
- Interactive map of the PHIVE area

General information
- Status: Completed
- Location: Dharug Country, Parramatta, New South Wales, Australia, 5 Parramatta Square, Parramatta, Australia
- Coordinates: 33.816087°S 151.00417°E
- Construction started: 2020
- Completed: April 2022
- Opened: 22 September 2022
- Cost: A$136 million
- Client: City of Parramatta

Height
- Height: 40 metres (130 ft)

Technical details
- Floor count: Eight
- Floor area: 15,000 square metres (160,000 sq ft)

Design and construction
- Architect: Manuelle Gautrand
- Main contractor: Built

PHIVE, also known as 5 Parramatta Square is a community, cultural and civic hub in Parramatta, New South Wales, Australia designed by French architect Manuelle Gautrand. Characterised by its vibrant red and orange tessellated roof, it represents a significant investment in the city's infrastructure, with construction costs amounting to $136 million. Spanning six levels, PHIVE includes a range of facilities such as a library, maker spaces, tech labs, sound studios, community meeting rooms, visitor services, and council chambers.

In 2025, the City of Parramatta council opened a new performing arts venue in the Discovery Space of PHIVE named Riverside Live at PHIVE.

== Design ==
The building's unique aesthetic features over 549 tessellated panels in colours inspired by native flora, alongside a design that maximises natural light through its crystalline, fragmented structure. Equipped with smart technology, including giant louvres that adjust to weather conditions for natural ventilation, PHIVE embodies modernity while maintaining a connection to the heritage-listed Parramatta Town Hall. The design prioritises openness and expressiveness, offering tours to the public to explore its innovative and welcoming space.
