= 6 & 8 Parramatta Square =

Skyscraper in New South Wales, Australia

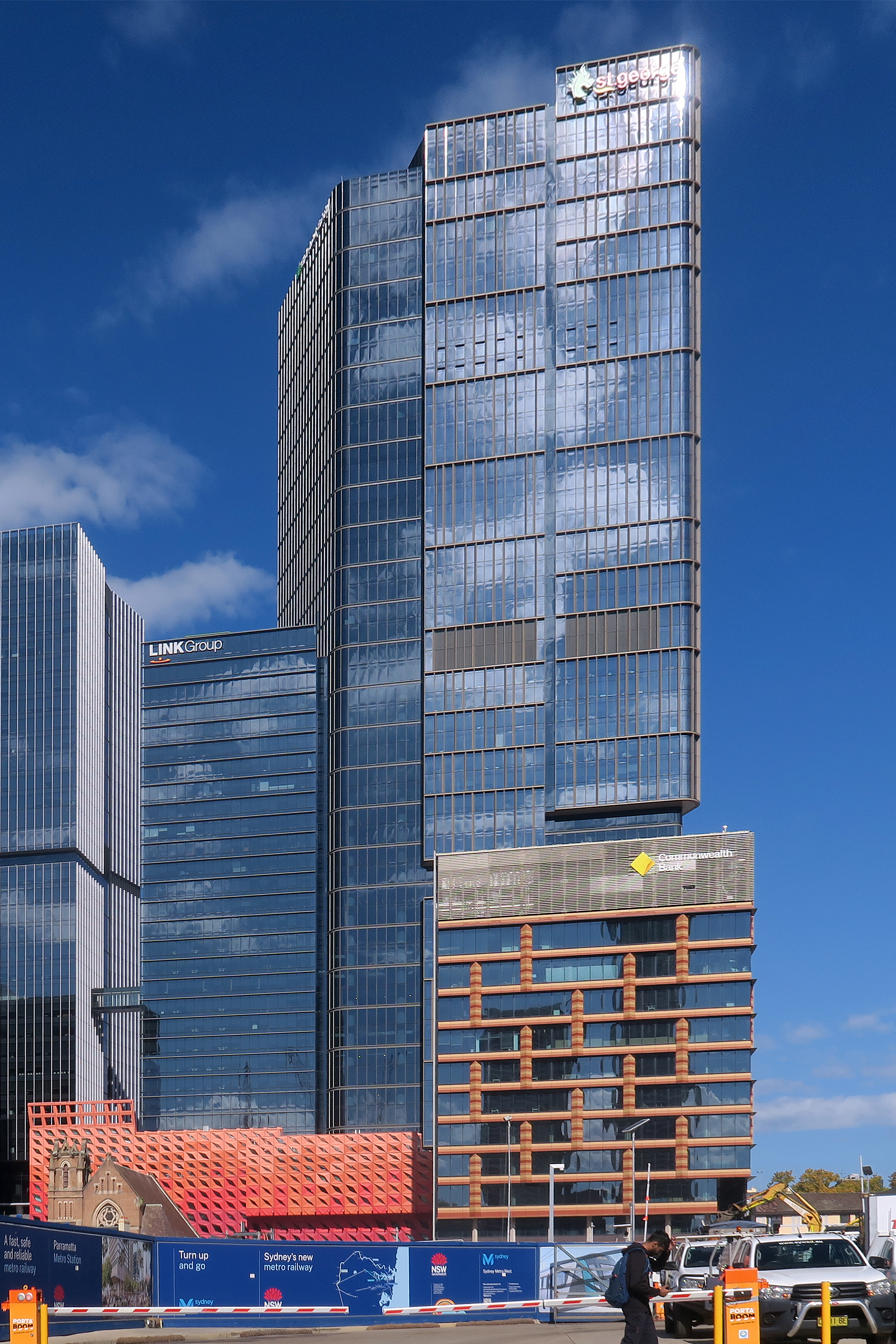
- 6 & 8 Parramatta Square, May 2025

General information
- Status: Completed
- Location: 160–182 Church Street, Parramatta, Australia
- Coordinates: 33.816282720413696°S 151.00356524938698°E
- Groundbreaking: 2019
- Estimated completion: 2022
- Cost: ~AUD$700 million

Height
- Roof: 225.45 m (740 ft)

Technical details
- Floor count: 57

Design and construction
- Architect: Johnson Pilton Walker
- Developer: Walker Corporation
- Engineer: Built

References
- Aspire Tower

6 & 8 Parramatta Square is a skyscraper in Parramatta, New South Wales, Australia, a centrepiece of the Parramatta Square development (located within the Greater Sydney region, approximately 24 km (15 mi) from Sydney City Centre). The building consists entirely of commercial office space, making up 120,000 square metres (1,300,000 sq ft) of floorspace, at a height of 225.45 metres (739.7 ft), making it the tallest building in Parramatta and outside the Sydney central business district. It was built in the Parramatta Square Development on plot 8 called PSQ8.

== Development ==
=== Former proposals ===
2012

An earlier incarnation of a building on this site was a development on 160–182 Church Street in Parramatta conceived in July 2012, when plans were released for a 215 metres (705 ft) tall skyscraper of 65 storeys. This project would form one of the key developments of Parramatta Square, formerly known as Civic Place. The residential skyscraper, designed by Grimshaw Architects, would have become the tallest building in Parramatta, and the 9th tallest building in New South Wales when skyscrapers in Sydney are factored in.

2013–15

In early 2013, a development plan application was lodged, which would see the skyscraper significantly altered in terms of height and amenities. The new proposal would include a 336 metres (1,102 ft) tall skyscraper with 88 storeys, comprising 700 residential apartments, a 150-room hotel and retail space. Dubbed "Aspire Parramatta", the skyscraper would have also included an observation deck (second tallest in the country, behind Melbourne's Eureka Tower). If constructed, the building would have surpassed the Gold Coast's Q1 as the tallest building in Australia, and with a roof height of 306 metres, it would have also supplanted the Eureka Tower for the title of the tallest building in Australia to roof.

By late August 2014, the supertall building proposal was questioned after issues regarding height restrictions emerged with aviation authorities, such as the Civil Aviation Safety Authority. These reports came only a few months after it was confirmed that Melbourne's Australia 108 initial supertall proposal would be shelved following concerns by CASA, despite the approval of State Government planning for the building.

Soon after, new recommendations proposed for a building no more than 243 metres tall. In October 2014, Parramatta council submit a proposal to the City Centre Planning Framework Review to remove the existing building height limit. In May 2015, the Government of New South Wales scrapped the existing building height restrictions in Parramatta, which would allow for a 306 m (1,004 ft) high building to be constructed. In order for the latter to eventuate, the project had to receive final approval from the Civil Aviation Safety Authority. In addition to the progress on height restrictions, Parramatta City Council also approved development applications to demolish its Darcy Street Council offices and the Civic Place Library building in preparation for the Parramatta Square development - the city's new commercial office space and the Aspire Tower.

By August 2015, the Walker Corporation was appointed developer of the Aspire project. In conjunction with the announcement of Walker's appointment, it was revealed the tower would have to be reduced to 68 storeys, and a height of 230 m (755 ft), in order to abide by aviation guidelines.

2016–2017

In early 2016, the Walker Corporation launched a design competition for the Aspire Tower. The initial design for the building won in 2012 by Grimshaw Architects, was shelved, hence allowing Walker to pursue a new direction. Competing for the design of the tower were submissions from 10 local and international architectural practices; of those, four were shortlisted — Fender Katsalidis, DBI Design, PTW Architects and Bates Smart. The latter, Bates Smart, was selected by a jury of four Parramatta individuals in March. The A$700 million skyscraper project will be devised into two phases:

- Phase 1 application was lodged in April 2017 for a 73-storey skyscraper, with a height of 239 m (784 ft). Should the Walker Corporation and CASA reach a successful agreement pertaining to lifting the height limit on the project, a second application – Phase 2 – will be lodged.
- Phase 2 would have seen an application lodged for a 90-storey skyscraper, with a height of approximately 300 m (984 ft).

Notwithstanding which phase goes ahead, the residential, hotel and observation aspect of the skyscraper will be retained in the design. The Walker Corporation anticipated a 2020 completion date for Aspire.

=== Current development ===
2017–present

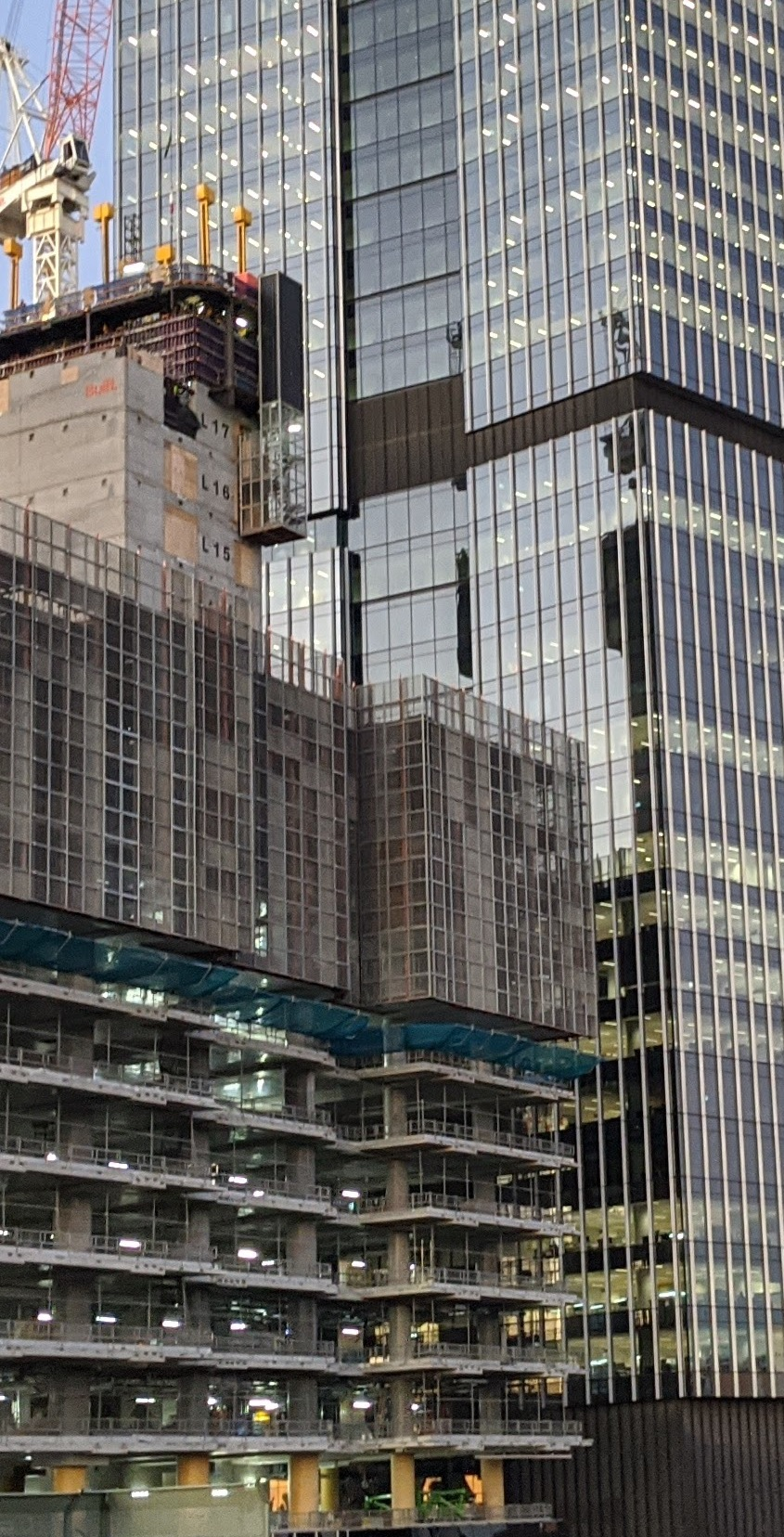
Construction, June 2020

In September 2017, the residential tower was scrapped in favour of a 55-storey 233 m office designed by Johnson Pilton Walker. The name Aspire was shelved, and lots 6 and 8 of Parramatta Square were amalgamated for the development of a commercial building with larger floor plates and a total commercial floor area of 120,000sqm, officially known as 6 & 8 Parramatta Square. Construction began in 2019, before topping out in November 2021. During construction, several archaeological discoveries were made, including a convict graveyard under what is now the south side of 6 Parramatta Square dating from the early 19th century. Construction and fitout were completed in 2022.

== See also ==
- List of tallest buildings in Parramatta
- List of tallest buildings in Australia
