= List of tallest buildings in Parramatta =

The suburb of Parramatta, a major commercial centre in the metropolitan area of Sydney, New South Wales, Australia, is home to numerous skyscrapers and high-rise buildings. Of those completed or topped out, there are 14 buildings which reach a height of at least 100 metres (328 ft) and 9 which reach a height of at least 150 metres (492 ft). In accordance with the ranking system used by the Council on Vertical Urbanism, heights are measured to the structural height, which includes architectural elements, such as spires, but not communications antennas. Nonbuilding structures are not included.

== Tallest completed and topped out buildings ==
This is a list of the tallest buildings in Parramatta which are completed or topped out.

Rank	Name	Image	Height (m)	Height (ft)	Floors	Built	Use
1	6 & 8 Parramatta Square		225	740	57	2022	Office
2	8 Phillip Street		218	715	66	2025	Residential
3	180 George Street - North Tower		213	699	67	2023	Residential
4	180 George Street - South Tower		189	620	59	2023	Mixed use
5	Altitude West Tower		177	581	55	2017	Mixed use
=6	4 Parramatta Square		158	518	34	2020	Office
=6	Paramount on Parkes		158	518	47	2024	Residential
8	116 Macquarie Street		156	511	48	2025	Residential
9	The Lennox		152	499	43	2021	Residential
10	Skyrise		138	451	43	2018	Residential
11	West Village		129	423	39	2019	Residential
12	Altitude East Tower		127	417	39	2016	Residential
13	32 Smith Street		114	374	28	2020	Office
14	V by Crown		103	338	29	2016	Residential
15	Rise		92	302	28	2016	Mixed use
16	B1 Tower		90	295	28	2013	Residential
17	Eclipse		89	292	21	2012	Office
18	Escen on Church		87	285	25	2006	Residential
19	Commonwealth Centre		85	279	21	1983	Office
20	3 Parramatta Square		84	276	17	2020	Office
21	Highline Lot 5		83	272	24	2020	Residential
22	Colonial Tower		83	272	21	1992	Office
23	Engineering Innovation Hub		82	269	19	2021	Mixed use
24	Sydney Water HQ		76	249	17	2009	Office
25	Powerhouse Parramatta		75	246	7	2026	Mixed use
=26	The Galleria		72	236	22	2019	Residential
=26	Horizon Tower A		72	236	23	2021	Residential
=26	Horizon Tower B		72	236	23	2021	Residential

== Approved and under construction buildings ==
This is a list of the tallest buildings in Parramatta which are approved or under construction.

Key:
Topped out	Under construction	Approved

Name/Address	Height		Floors	Purpose	Completion	Status
Name/Address	m	ft	Floors	Purpose	Completion	Status
Burramatta Place	235	771	57	Commercial	TBA	Approved
2 O'Connell Street	217	712	66	Residential	TBA	Approved
Westfield Tower	210	690	46	Mixed use	TBA	Approved
GQ Parramatta	201	659	61	Residential	TBA	Approved
195 Church Street (Office)	193	633	45	Commercial	TBA	Approved
87 Church Street	180	590	55	Residential	TBA	Approved
135 George Street	166	545	51	Mixed use	TBA	Approved
204 Fitzwilliam Street	154	505	47	Residential	TBA	Approved
Cosmopolitan (Tower 1)	154	505	46	Mixed use	TBA	Under construction
81 George Street	154	505	37	Commercial	TBA	Approved
195 Church Street (Residential)	152	499	43	Residential	TBA	Approved
Cosmopolitan (Tower 2)	151	495	46	Mixed use	TBA	Under construction

== See also ==
- List of tallest buildings in Sydney
- List of tallest buildings in Australia
- List of tallest buildings in Oceania
