= 8 Phillip Street =

Skyscraper in Parramatta, Australia

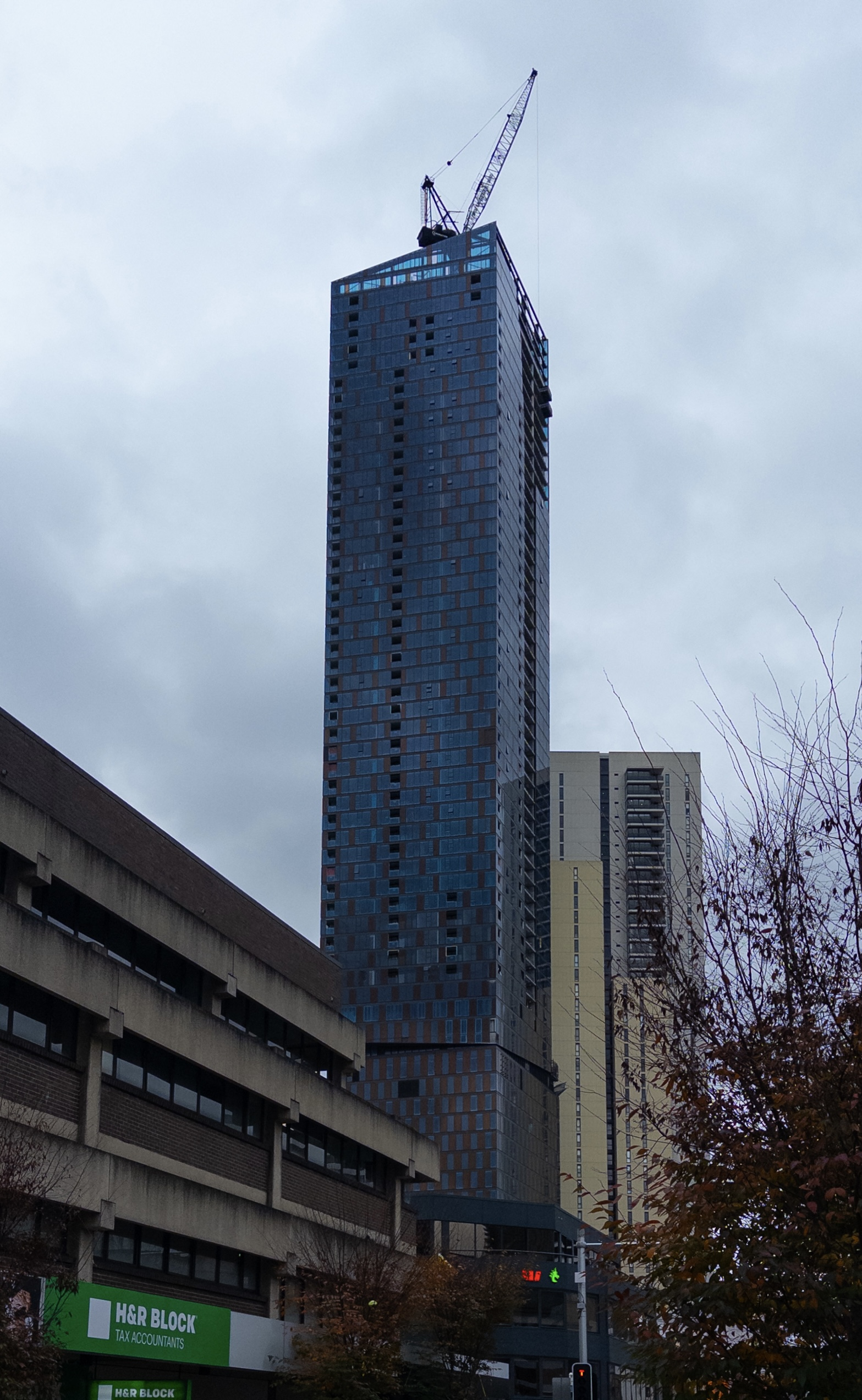
- Photo of the building under construction on 28 May 2026 from Church and Macquarie Streets

General information
- Location: Parramatta, Australia
- Coordinates: 33.8117°S 151.0031°E
- Construction started: 2019
- Opening: 2026 (planned)

Height
- Height: 218 m (715 ft)

Design and construction
- Architecture firm: Woods Bagot
- Developer: Coronation Property

8 Phillip Street is a skyscraper in Parramatta, New South Wales, Australia, which is currently under construction.

== History ==
Construction of the building, developed by the real estate company Coronation Property and designed by the architecture firm Woods Bagot, began in 2019 with completion scheduled for 2026.

The skyscraper topped-out in 2025.

== Description ==
The building is located in Parramatta's CBD, west of central Sydney, and will have 66 floors and a height of 218 metres. A mixed-use development, it will incorporate apartments as well as a hotel and commercial spaces.

The project included a careful restoration and integration of the pre-existing St Andrew's Church. The podium of the new building, characterised by a smaller footprint than the upper floors, allows for expanded public space at street level and highlights the respectful integration of the church and its spire into the new complex.

== See also ==
- List of tallest buildings in Parramatta
