= Centenary Square, Parramatta =

Civic square in Parramatta, New South Wales, Australia

Centenary Square (1888–1988; 2014– )
- Bicentennial Square (1988–2014)
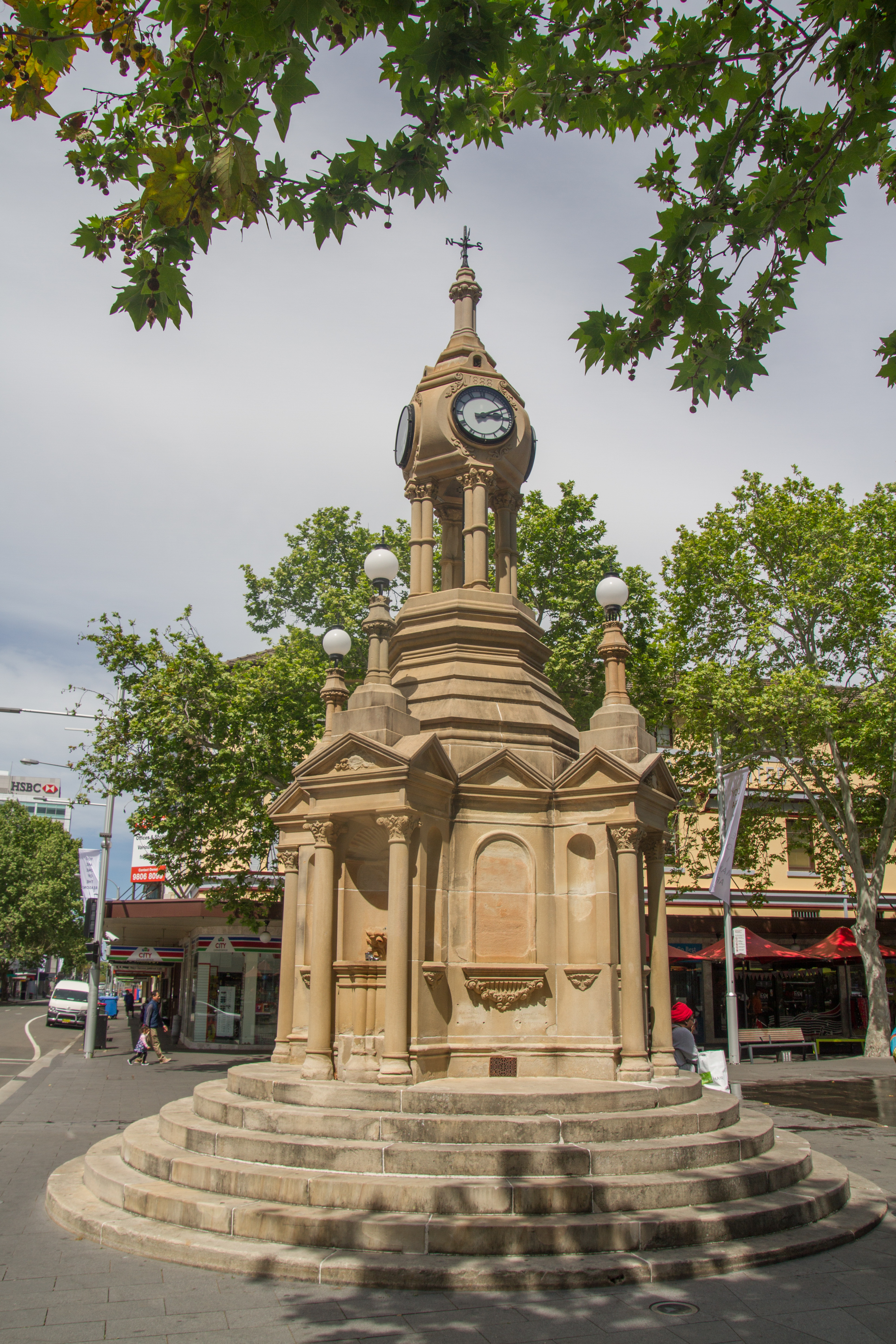
- The 1888 Victorian Free Classically-styled clock, with the drinking fountain removed, pictured in 2016
- Interactive map of Centenary Square (1888–1988; 2014– )
- Type: Civic square
- Location: Parramatta, Parramatta City Council, Sydney, New South Wales, Australia
- Coordinates: 33°48′55″S 151°00′11″E
- Etymology: Australian Centenary; Australian Bicentenary
- Operator: Parramatta City Council
- Open: 24 hours
- Status: Open all year

New South Wales Heritage Database (Local Government Register)
- Official name: Bicentennial Square and Adjoining Buildings
- Type: Local government heritage (complex / group)
- Criteria: a., c., f.
- Designated: 20 August 1999
- Reference no.: 103
- Type: Recreation and Entertainment
- Category: Tourist Attractions

Centenary Square, formerly known as Bicentennial Square, is a civic square located in the center of Parramatta, New South Wales, Australia. It faces the 1883 Parramatta Town Hall and St John's Cathedral. The square was listed on the Parramatta City Council local government heritage list on 20 August 1999.

== Features and history ==
To celebrate the colony's centenary, in 1888 the Parramatta Borough Council erected, at a cost of A£600, the Centennial Memorial, a Victorian Free Classically-styled elaborate clock and drinking fountain.

To mark the opening of the Church Street Mall in 1986 and the closure of through traffic on Church Street, a time capsule was buried under one of the square's gardens by Janice Crosio MP, NSW Minister for Water Resources. In order to mark the Australian Bicentenary in 1988, the Parramatta City Council commissioned the sculpture, Procession, by artist Richard Goodwin.

The Parramatta City Council reverted the square's name to Centenary Square on 24 September 2014.

The commercial buildings surrounding the square are mainly two-storeyed, with one of the Murray Buildings (alongside the Town Hall and farthest from St Johns) are three storeys. Murray Brothers erected the town's first department store in 1926; and other major stores soon followed. This was also the site where Rev. Samuel Marsden once lived. Outside St John's Cathedral stands a memorial to those who served in World War I. This takes the form of a stone arch and plaques; and was erected in 1917.

The square serves as the eastern terminus of the proposed 65-kilometre (40 mi) Great West Walk connecting Parramatta and Penrith via the Western Sydney Parklands.

In the early morning of the 1st of November 2014 the Square became a live site for fans of the Western Sydney Wanderers FC to watch the 2014 AFC Champions League final second leg. Thousands of fans showed up and packed the square to watch the Wanderers claim the title with a 0-0 draw for the match giving them the win on the away goals rule after the 1-0 win in Parramatta in the first leg.

== See also ==
- List of parks in Sydney
- History of New South Wales
