= White Transit Company =

- Commenced operation: 18 October 1924
- Ceased operation: 31 October 1931
- Headquarters: Crows Nest
- Service area: Lower North Shore, Sydney
- Service type: Bus services
- Routes: 11
- Depots: 1
- Fleet: 33

White Transit Company was an Australian bus company operating route bus services on Sydney's Lower North Shore.

== History ==
Charles Hicks commenced operations on 18 October 1924 with six White buses. It became a public company in 1925. It had its headquarters in Crows Nest with the depot in Willoughby.

It quickly expanded to become the largest bus operator on the Lower North Shore. By 1925 it operated 11 routes, many of which connected with Sydney Ferries Limited services:

- 19: Balmoral Beach to Milsons Point wharf
- 40: Cammeray to Milsons Point wharf
- 51: Chatswood to Milsons Point wharf
- 52: Chatswood to Spit Junction
- 53: Chatswood to Milson Point wharf
- 95: Gladesville to Spit Junction
- 144: Manly to Spit Junction
- 149: Manly to Newport
- 214: Spit Junction to Milsons Point wharf
- 233: Willoughby to Milsons Point
- 236: Mosman to Musgrave Street wharf

In May 1927, route 95 ceased with the Gladesville to Lane Cove section taken over by Longueville Motor Bus Company. With the introduction of the Transport (Co-ordination) Act 1931 that banned buses from competing with trams, the business ceased on 31 October 1931.

== Fleet ==
At its peak, the fleet totalled 33, most of which were Whites.

== Depot ==
The depot was located at 462 Willoughby Road, Willoughby.
