= Buses in Sydney =

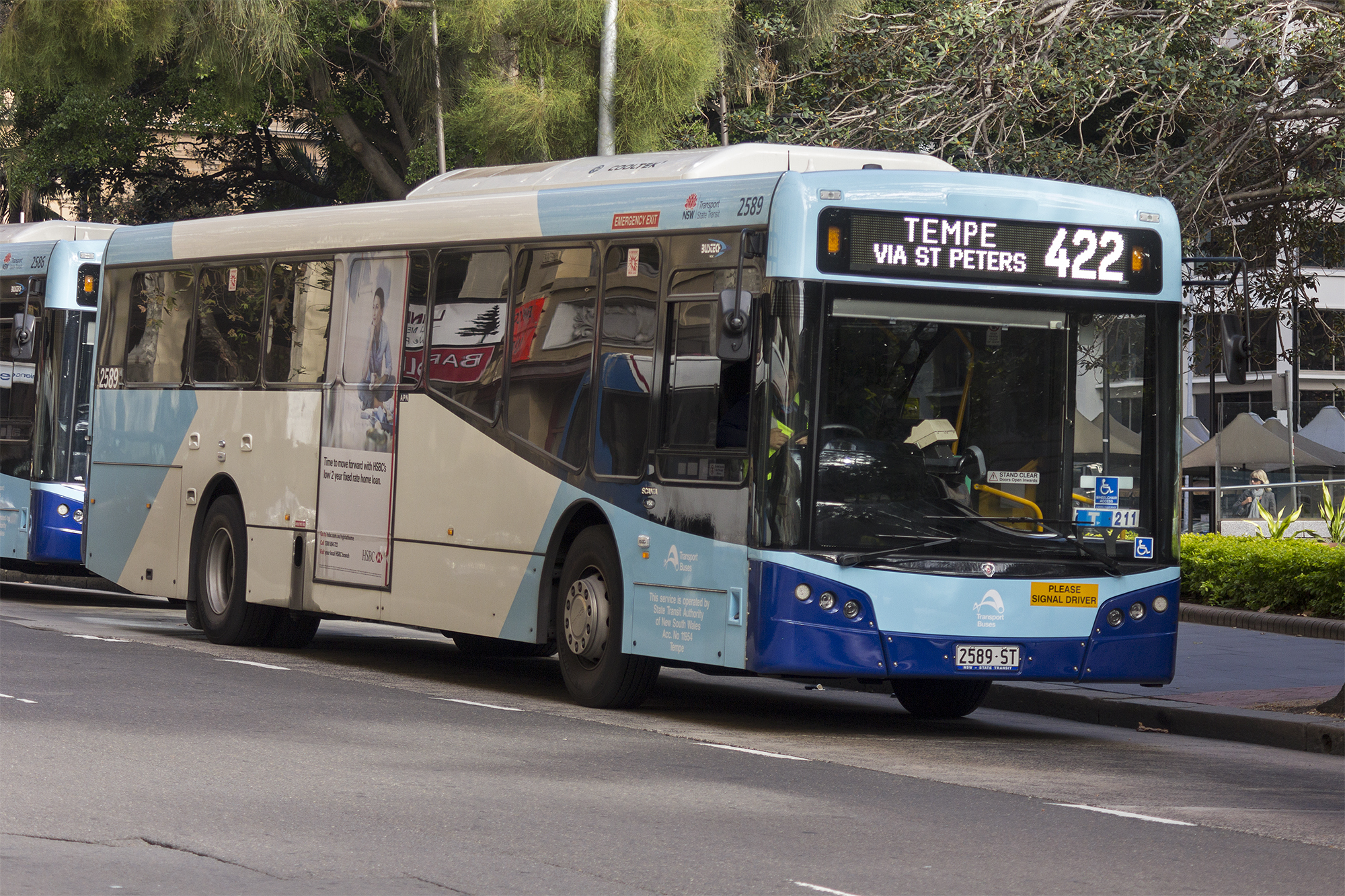
- A State Transit Scania K280UB

- Roundel

Overview
- Owner: Transport for NSW
- Locale: Greater Sydney
- Transit type: Bus / Bus rapid transit
- Annual ridership: 245.14 million (2025–26)
- Website: transportnsw.info

Operation
- Began operation: 1905
- Operators: Busways; CDC NSW; Keolis Northern Beaches; Transdev John Holland; Transit Systems; U-Go Mobility

Buses account for close to six per cent of trips each day in the city of Sydney, New South Wales, Australia, forming a key part of the city's public transport system. The network initially evolved from a privately operated system of feeder services to railway stations in the outer suburbs, and a publicly operated network of bus services introduced to replace trams in the inner suburbs. The bus network has undergone major reforms since the 2000s–2010s, with the New South Wales Government taking responsibility for route and fare-setting, opening contracts for most routes up to competitive tendering, and introducing more cross-suburban services.

The New South Wales Government's transport authority, Transport for NSW, administers the various bus networks in Sydney.

- Commuter bus services including Metrobus, B-Line and On Demand routes.
- NightRide, a network of train replacement services that operates each night between midnight and 5am.
- Bus only lanes and roadways associated with the Liverpool–Parramatta T-way and North-West T-way.
- Sydney Olympic Park bus routes, a network of nine routes used to convey passengers to major events at the precinct.
- School buses.

The networks, except the Olympic Park and On Demand routes, are part of Transport for NSW's Opal ticketing system.

Commuter and school services are assigned to one of 14 contract regions. In the 2025–26 financial year, 245.14 million passenger journeys were made on services in Sydney's bus contract regions.

== History ==
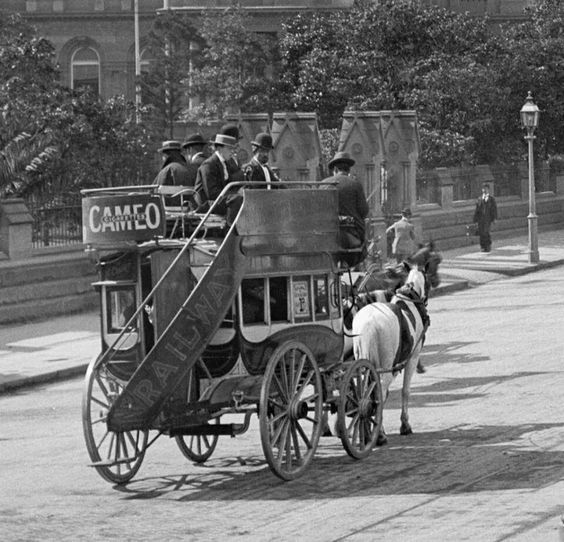
A horse-drawn omnibus in 1898

At the beginning of the 20th century, Sydney's public transport network was composed of a suburban railway and inner-city trams, both operated by the New South Wales Government Railways. These were complemented by various privately operated ferry services on Sydney Harbour and the Parramatta River, and a few horse-drawn services.

The Railways experimented with a steam-powered bus service from Potts Point to Darlinghurst in 1905, but the vehicles quickly proved unsatisfactory and the service was shut down within a year. The city's second bus route ran from Newport, in the north of the Northern Beaches district, to Manly, commencing in 1906. This was operated by the privately owned Manly-Pittwater Motor Omnibus Company. The company did not prosper, however, and the business was wound up in 1908.

The return of servicemen from World War I in the late 1910s provided fresh impetus to the motor omnibus industry. Here, suddenly, were thousands of men with experience working with heavy vehicles – all looking for work. In 1915, only 15 motorised buses were known to operate in Sydney. By 1929, the city's bus fleet numbered more than 600. A private bus industry, dominated by owner-operators and small family businesses, was taking shape.

Seeking to protect the tram system from competition, Premier Jack Lang introduced the Transport Act 1930, which empowered a new Metropolitan Transport Trust to shut down private bus routes that competed with trams, trains or other buses. The Railways were also restructured, with the tram system hived off into a new Department of Road Transport & Tramways in 1932. The department introduced its first bus service, route 144 from St Leonards to Manly, on Christmas Day of that year.

Lang's reforms established a structure for the bus network that was to endure for close to a century. On the one hand, the Department – forerunner to today's State Transit Authority – began to shut down its trams and build an extensive bus network serving the inner suburbs and Northern Beaches. On the other, the heavily regulated private operators remained small-scale, relegated to the status of feeder services for the Government's trains. But Lang's Transport Act held at least one benefit for the bus companies: just as the trams were protected from them, so too were they protected from new entrants to the industry.

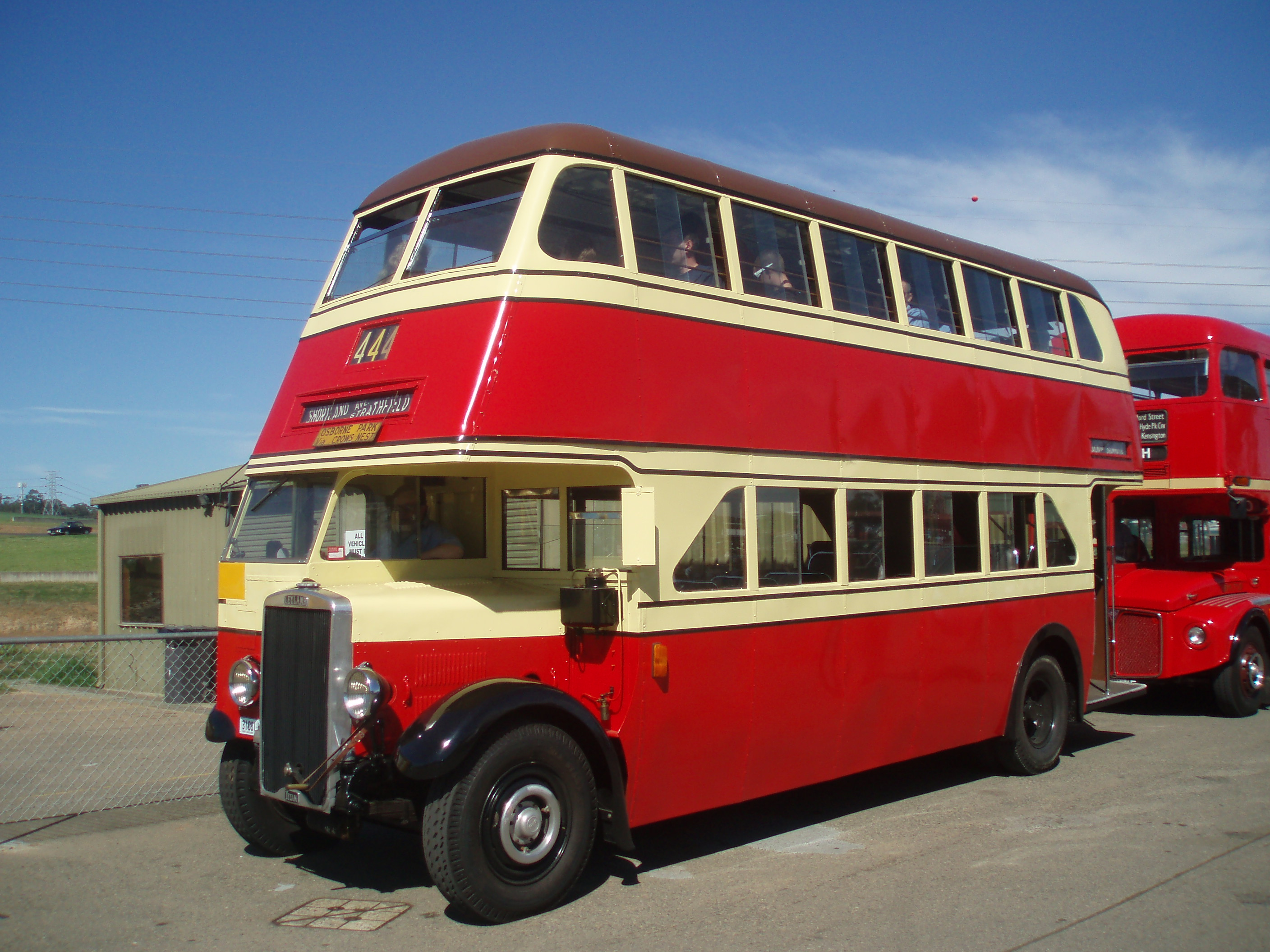
A 1936 Leyland Titan in the livery of the New South Wales Public Transport Commission.

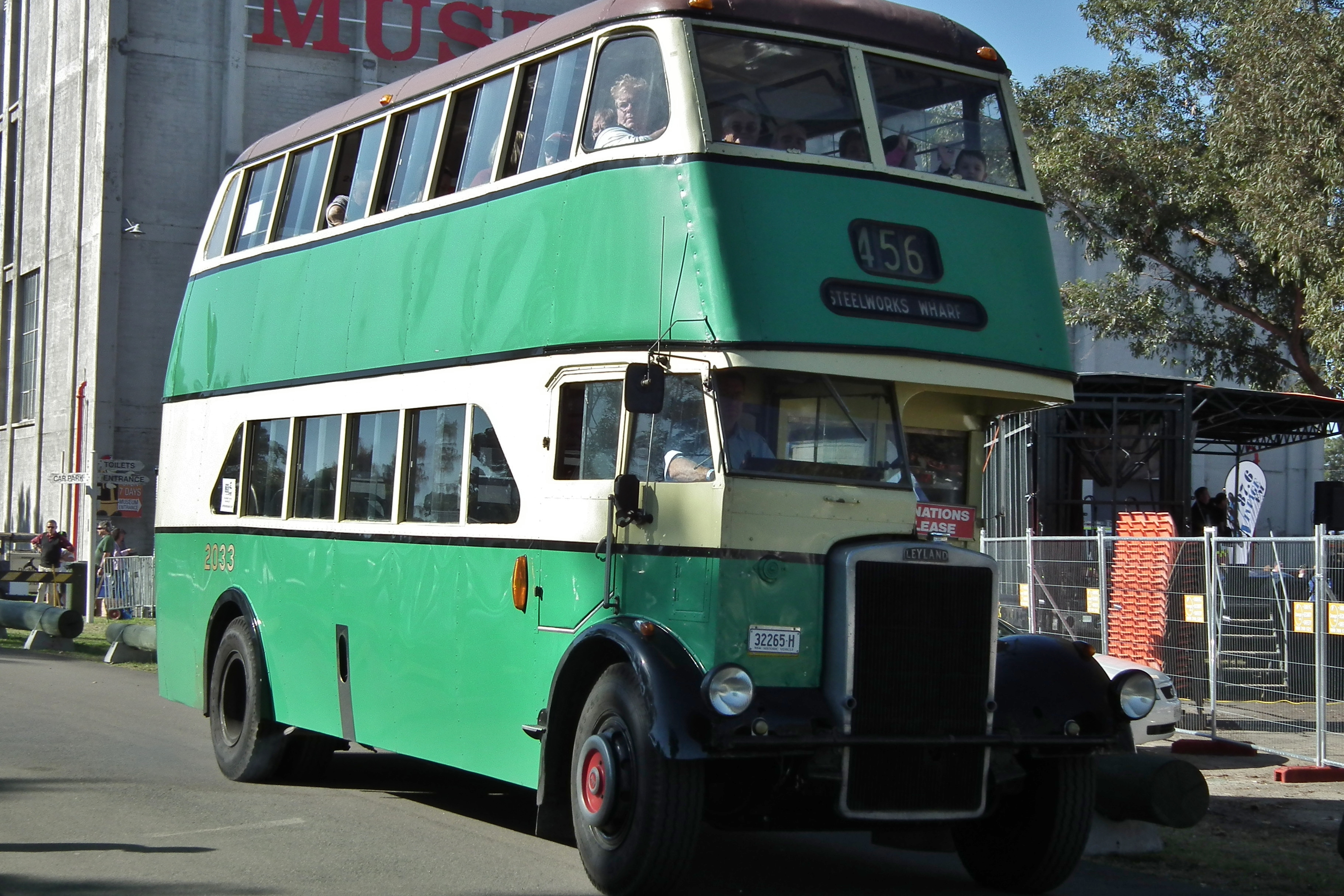
A 1948 Leyland Titan OPD2-1

In 1980, the Traffic Authority of New South Wales stated that transit lanes are provided in preference to bus lanes as bus lanes would "cause extreme over-loading of other lanes" along busy arterial roads.

=== From trams to buses ===
Route 144 started as a service in the 1920s connecting trains, trams and ferries. But the department's focus began to shift inexorably towards building its bus network, starting in 1937 when Kogarah's steam trams were replaced with trolleybuses. Two years later, tram services from Manly were replaced with buses. In 1948, a recommendation was handed to the department that the entire network be replaced with buses. Though initially controversial, the move to a bus network secured broad political support and was completed between 1957 and 1961. The department, renamed 'Government Transport' in 1952, became an operator of buses only.

For much of the 20th century, land use planning in Sydney restricted development to corridors within a short distance of the existing railway lines. This discipline broke down in the 1980s, however, when the Wran Government released new areas for development far from existing rail lines. This meant that buses outside of the inner-city, government-operated network, would play an increasing role in meeting Sydney's transport needs.

Lang's model divided the city into hundreds of exclusive fiefdoms and did not allow for cross-regional services. Some private operators responded with joint ventures under the "Red Arrow" brand, agreeing to jointly operate routes between major centres in each other's territories. Some of these routes survive in whole or part today.

=== Contracts ===
From 1930 until 1990, private bus companies in Sydney operated as licensed local monopolies, with a relatively free hand to set fares, determine routes, set service levels and choose vehicles. The Greiner Government changed this with the introduction of the Passenger Transport Act 1990. Although the government was loath to challenge the operators' local dominance, it insisted on forming contractual relationships between bus companies and the Department of Transport. These formed the basis for improvements to service standards and – in time – would allow the Government to consolidate the industry and create a truly integrated public transport network. The Government also dismantled one of the shibboleths of the Lang era, allowing Forest Coach Lines and Westbus to run direct services to the city, rather than just the nearest train station. In 1992, an inbound bus lane was installed on the Sydney Harbour Bridge to facilitate the additional services.

=== Unsworth review ===
Development in the Hills and Forest districts, far from railway lines, meant that long-distance private bus services poured across the Harbour Bridge to the City each morning. The growth of employment centres outside of the city and inner suburbs, including the growing significance of Parramatta, meant that more and more commuters were making cross-regional, rather than suburb-to-city, trips. Finally, the profusion of bus networks – in 2004, they numbered more than 80 – was confusing to planners and passengers alike. In return for their acceptance of limits to their operations, the small family-owned bus companies had enjoyed immunity from competition themselves. The result was a disparity in fares, vehicles and service quality across Sydney.

The Government commissioned a report into the bus network from former premier Barrie Unsworth. This report, released in 2004, formed a blueprint for major changes to the bus network, including:

- harmonisation of private and State Transit fares
- consolidation of bus regions and competitive tendering for rights to operate
- introduction of new, cross-regional routes.

Consolidation of bus contract regions, from more than 80 to just 15, forced the amalgamation of decades-old bus companies and cleared the way for the entry of players from interstate and overseas.

Starting in October 2008 a number of Metrobus routes were introduced.

Cross-regional connectivity received further boosts with the completion of dedicated T-way networks, between Liverpool and Parramatta and between Parramatta, Blacktown and Rouse Hill.

== Contract regions ==
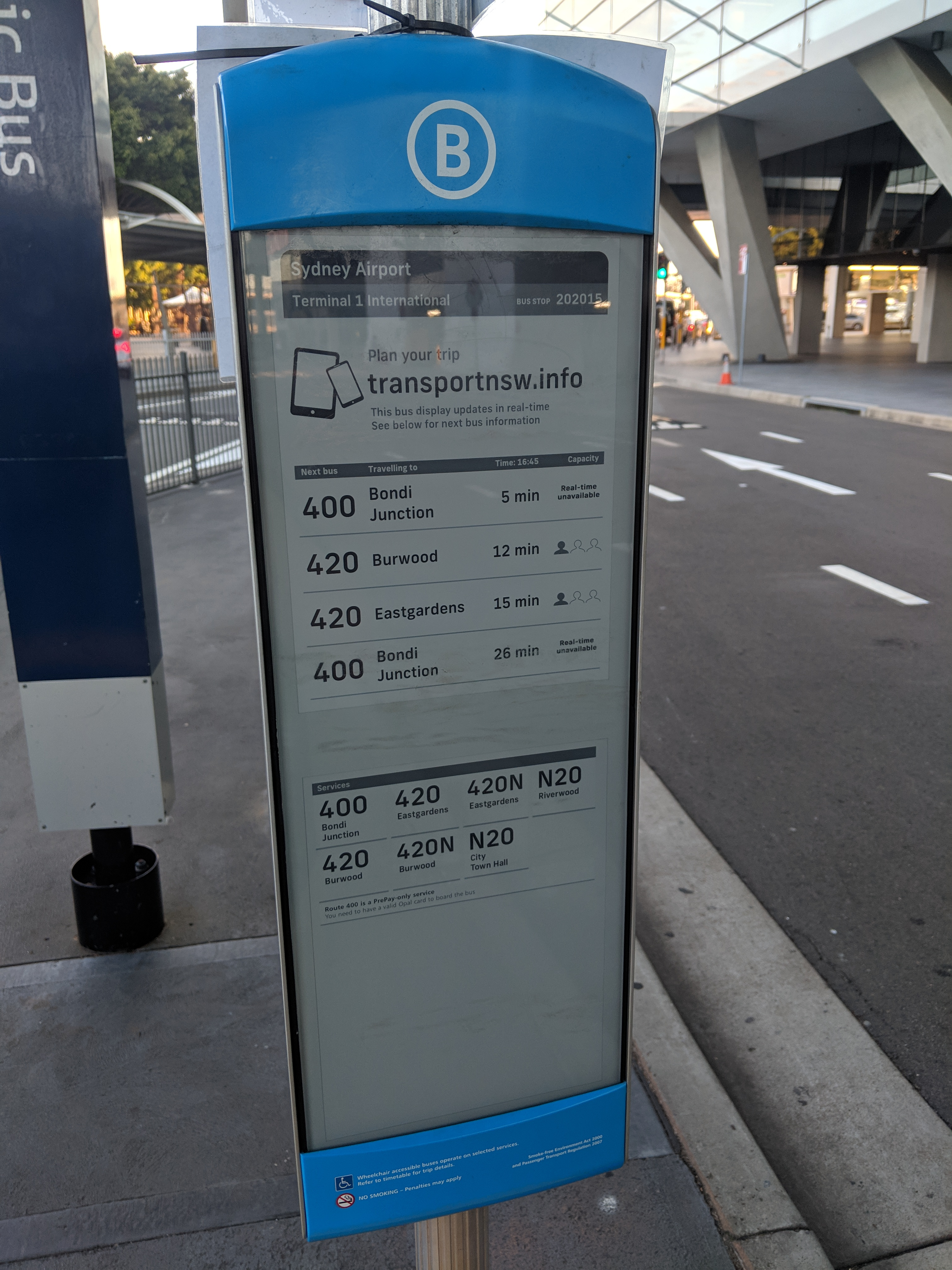
A real-time electronic sign at the Sydney Airport International Terminal bus stop

All bus services in Sydney are operated by privately owned bus operators, provided under service contracts between the operators and Transport for NSW. There are 11 contract regions (10 from October 2023), each of which is tied to a geographical area.

Current contracts commenced prior to 2018 operate for five years, with an option to extend for a further three years. Contracts commenced and awarded since 2018 are for an eight-year period. All of these contracts were awarded via open tender.

=== Routes ===
==== B1 Mona Vale to Sydney CBD ====
This is a limited stops route operating in the Northern Beaches region of Sydney. It is operated with a dedicated fleet of double deck buses. It runs from Mona Vale in the Northern Beaches to Wynyard Station in Sydney CBD.

==== T80 Liverpool to Parramatta ====
This is a bus rapid transit route operating in the south western part of Sydney, mostly along dedicated bus-only roads and bus lanes on roads. Other bus routes also operate on the T-way

==== North-West T-way ====
A variety of routes operate along various sections of this T-Way, including some express services to the CBD. There used to be end-to-end services like the T80, but these ceased in 2019 when the Sydney Metro opened

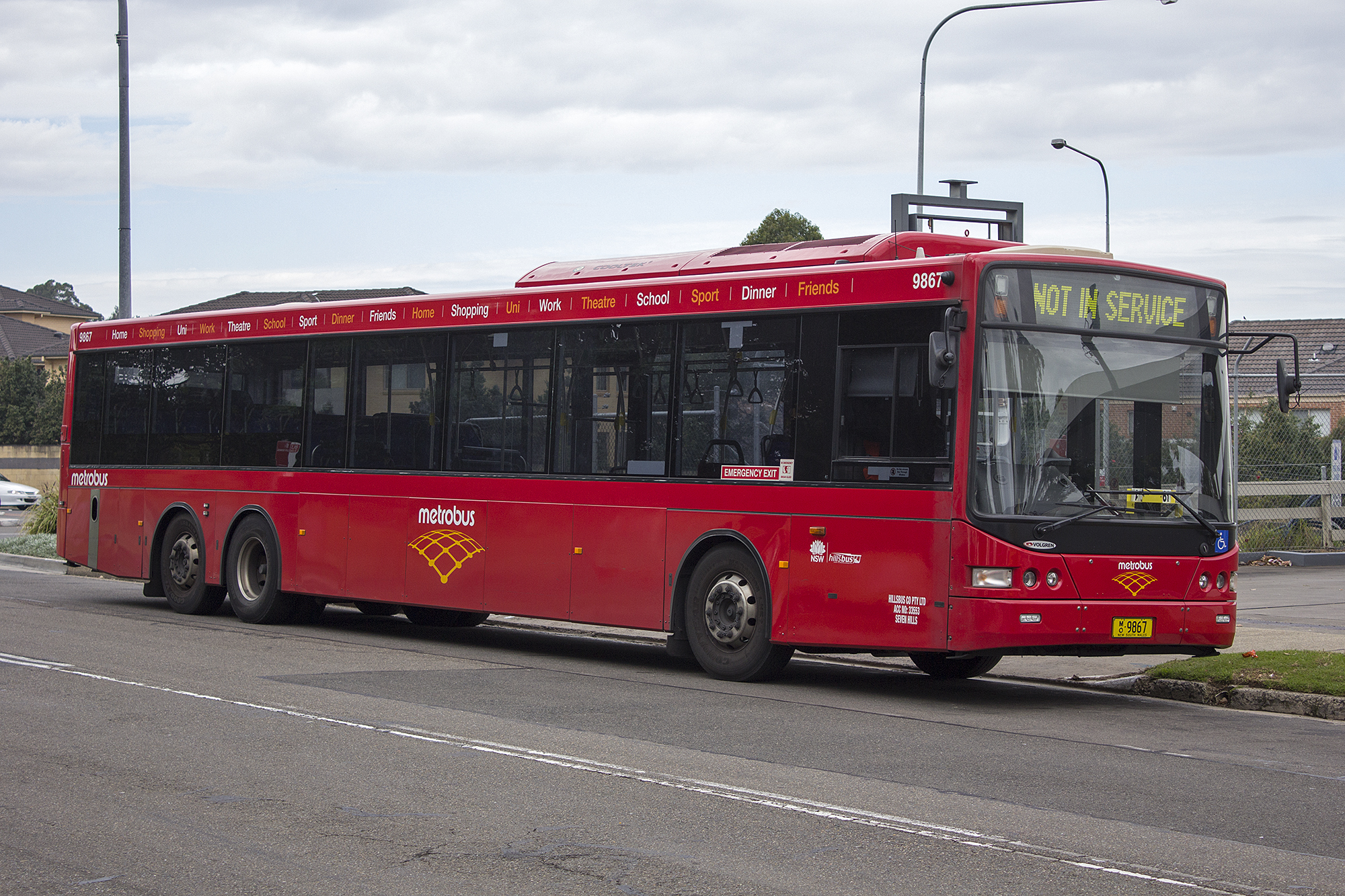
A Metrobus liveried Scania K280UB 14.5m at Castle Hill

==== Metrobus routes ====
Metrobus routes operate in various parts of Sydney. The original Metrobus routes run along major inner city corridors, passing through the Sydney central business district without terminating there. Later routes operate in areas further out from the city centre, connecting major suburban precincts. Metrobus routes are increasingly being debranded into normal routes, with many routes having now lost the M prefix, in case of confusion with metro services. The M90 from Burwood to Liverpool is the last Metrobus service operating today.

==== Other routes ====
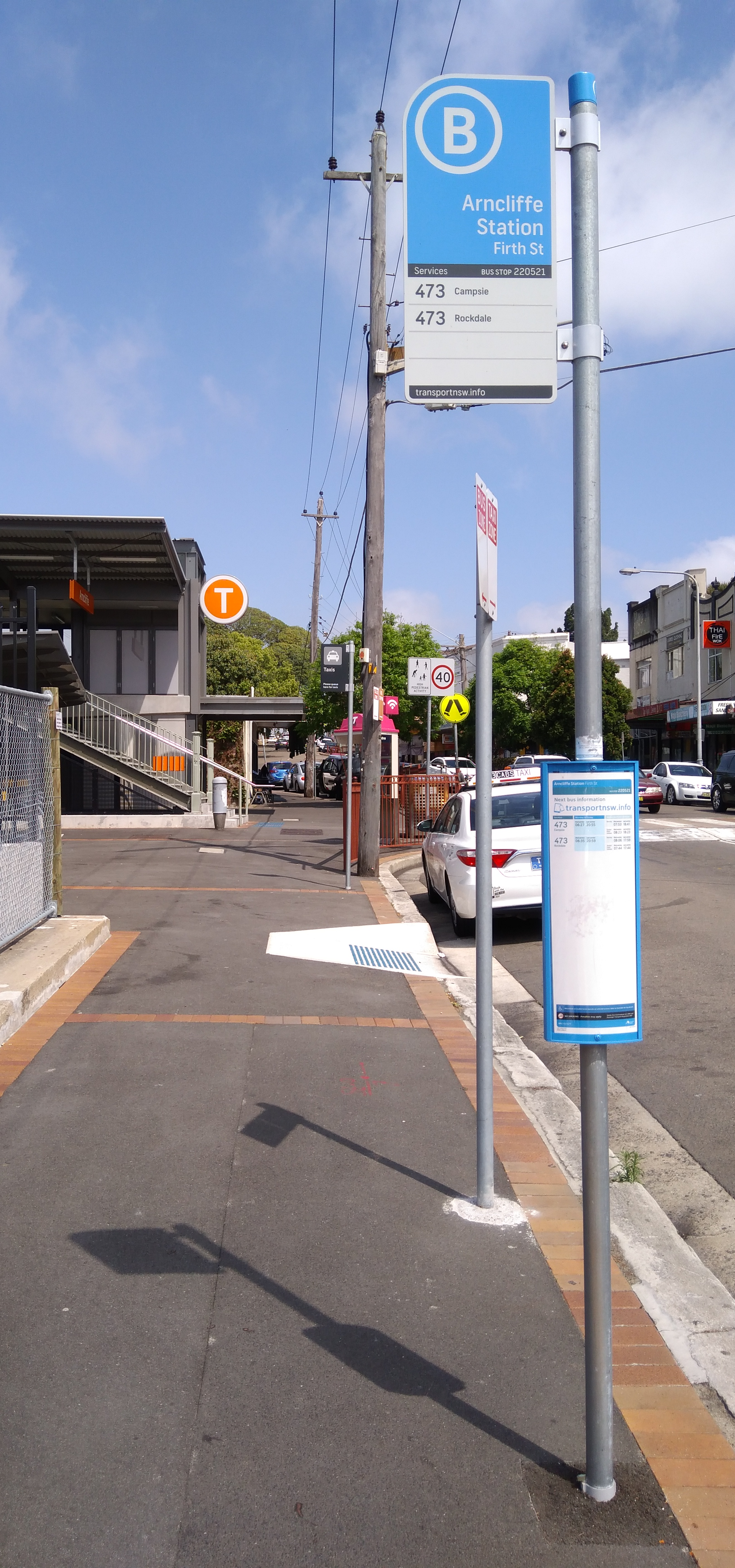
Bus, train and taxi signage at Arncliffe railway station adheres to the guidelines set by Transport for NSW.

Many other routes operate throughout Sydney. Most of these routes are classified with three-digit route numbers based on the area of the city they operate in:

- 100 series – Northern Beaches
- 200 series – Northern Districts and North Shore
- 300 series – Eastern Suburbs
- 400 series – Inner West and Southern Suburbs
- 500 series – North West
- 600 series – Western Suburbs and Hills District (including T-way services)
- 700 series – Outer Western Suburbs and Hills District (including T-way services)
- 800 series – Outer South-Western Suburbs
- 900 series – St George/Sutherland and South West and other Free shuttles.

Special services are denoted by letter prefixes in their route number:

- M – Metrobus services (all but the M90 have been renumbered into normal 3-digit numbers as of June 2026)
- B – B-Line services
- BN – B-Line overnight services
- S – "Shopper Hopper" route (used for some private operators' routes that typically run between morning and afternoon peaks, Monday to Friday only)
- N – NightRide services

Previous prefixes were also used but have since been phased out. These include:

- X – Express service used by in State Transit regions 6 to 7 and 9. These were replaced with X suffixes.
- E – Express service used by in State Transit region 8. These were replaced with X suffixes.
- L – Limited Stops service used in State Transit regions 6 to 9, including route L90 (formerly the longest bus route in Sydney). Limited Stops routes in other regions use normal three-digit numbers or with an X suffix. L prefixes were replaced with X suffixes.
- T – Services operating via a T-Way. These were replaced with regular 2-or-3-digit numbers, excepting the T80

Some routes have a suffix to their route numbers instead of a prefix:

- N – Overnight services for the routes concerned with some minor variations (used since 2018)
- X – Express or limited stops, including region 4 services via Lane Cove Tunnel. Some of them are the express or limited stops versions of all-stops routes of the same number (without the X suffix)
- Any other letter – Used by some operators to denote the destination of routes with more than two termini. For example, the suffixes W and K are used by Busabout to denote variants of routes 884 and 883 that service Wedderburn and Kentlyn respectively.

School bus services in former State Transit regions are suffixed with N (Region 8), S (Region 6), E (Region 9) and W (Region 7). However, bus destinations boards do not show the suffix due to technical limitations. On newer buses with electronic pixel boards, some prefixes still stand; mainly the S prefix, bus as 'School'

== Rail and ferry replacement bus services ==
Rail replacement bus services in Sydney replace or supplement train services, but charge train or metro fares. Ferry replacement bus services also sometimes replace F3 Parramatta River services between Parramatta and Sydney Olympic Park when there is low tide.

=== Station Link ===
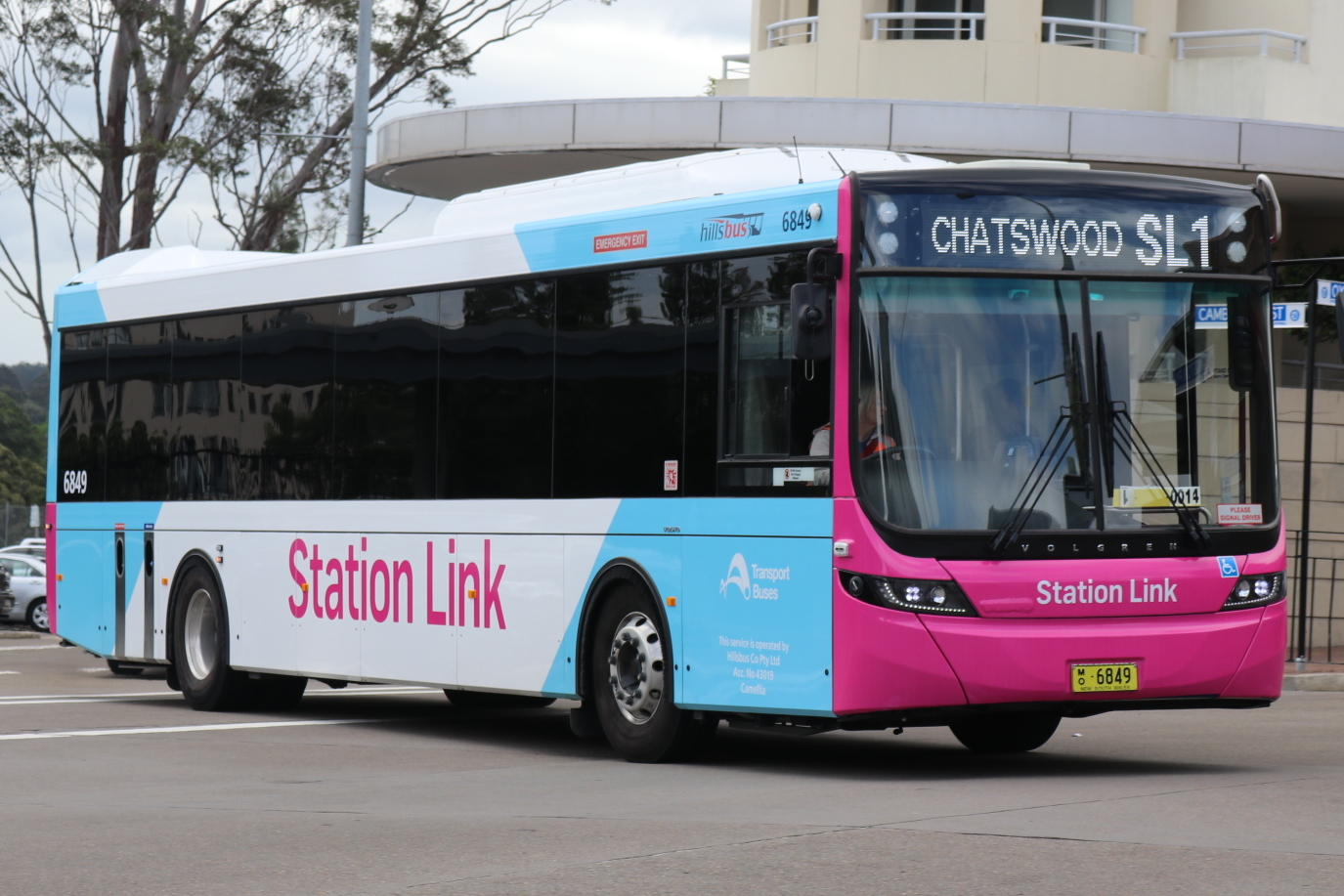
A Station Link bus

From September 2018 to May 2019, Station Link bus services replaced rail services between Chatswood and Epping, while the Epping to Chatswood rail link was converted and upgraded to metro services. The main service SL1, operated frequently throughout the day, stopping at all stops between Chatswood and Epping. The other services SL2–SL7, operated only during weekday peak hours. Fares on these bus routes were charged at train rates. The services were jointly operated by Transdev NSW and Hillsbus.

Two weeks before its cessation, over 4.3 million trips had been taken on Station Link.

=== North West Night Bus ===
From 26 May to 5 November 2019, North West Night Bus operated on two supplementary late night bus services, NW1 and NW2, to supplement the Metro North West Line metro operations on Sunday to Wednesday nights. They are successors to the Station Link, which was discontinued due to the opening of Sydney Metro. Metro fares were charged on these bus routes. Like Station Link, both Night Bus services were also operated by Transdev and Hillsbus.

=== Route 535 ===
The T6 Carlingford Line ceased operations for conversion to Parramatta Light Rail on 5 January 2020, and a replacement bus service, route 535, commenced operations on the same day. It charges train fares and runs between Carlingford and Parramatta. It was operated by Hillsbus (and later CDC NSW). The service ceased on 7 January 2025 following the opening of the Parramatta Light Rail two weeks earlier.

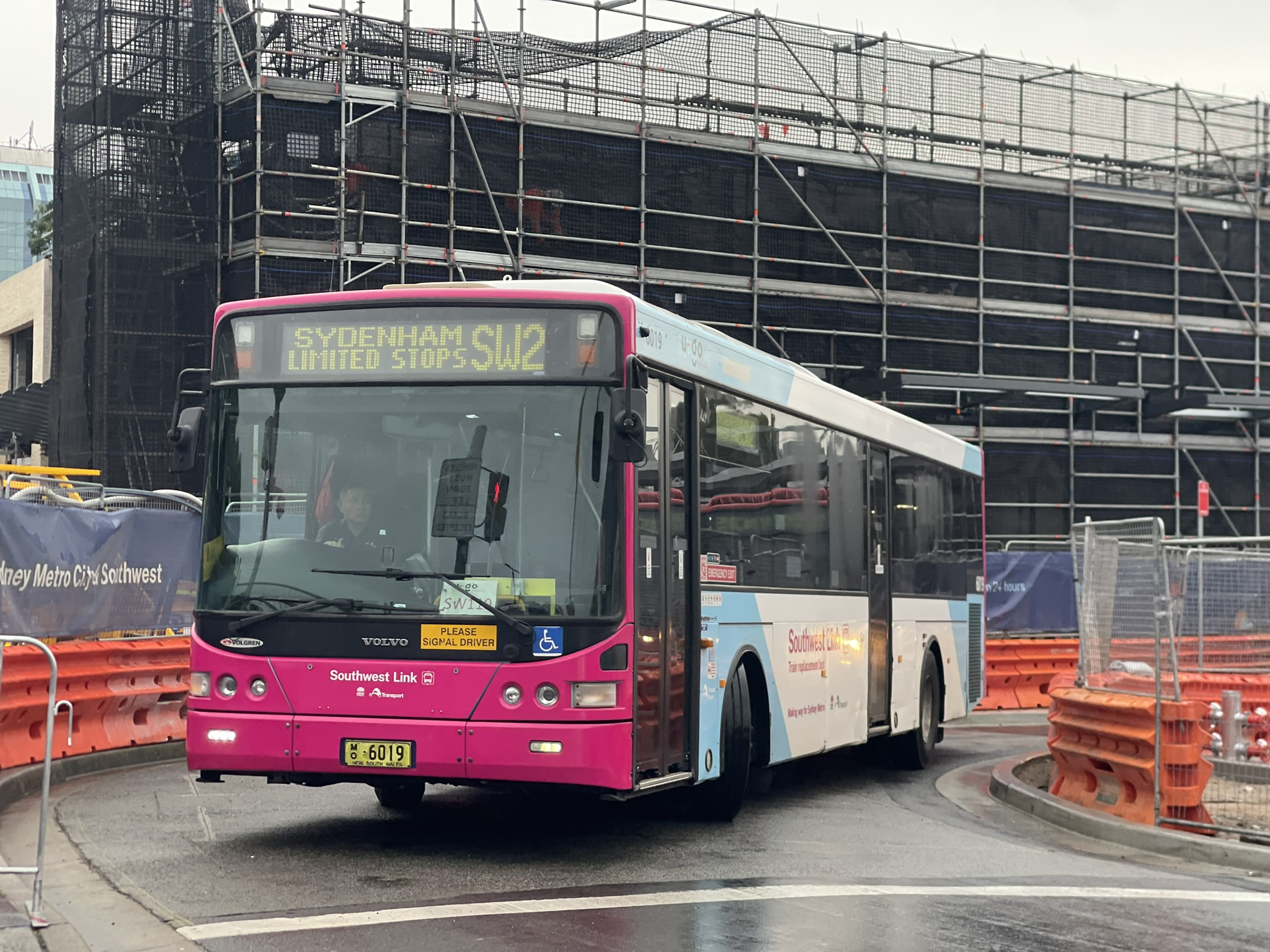
A U-Go Mobility Southwest Link bus on an SW2 to Sydenham.

=== Bankstown Line replacement bus services (Southwest Link) ===
Beginning in 2019, buses replaced trains between Bankstown and Sydenham during the Christmas and New Year period, along with selected school holiday periods for preliminary works relating to the Bankstown line metro conversion. This procedure will continue until that section of the line will complete its integration into the Metro North West & Bankstown Line.

In April 2024, it was announced by the state government that the metro conversion was expected to begin between July and October 2024 and operate for up to 12 months. Replacement buses would be branded as "Southwest Link". The Southwest Link service began on 30 September 2024. Southwest Link ceased on 2 November 2026, shortly after the Sydenham to Bankstown M1 extension commenced on 30 October 2026.

There are 3 lines operated as the Southwest Link, using the SW prefix.

SW1 – Sydenham to Bankstown (and return) all stops

SW2 – Sydenham to Bankstown (and return) express to Belmore then all stops

SW3 – Sydenham to Canterbury and Campsie (and return)

=== Trackwork buses ===
Buses are also frequently used to replace train lines that are closed for trackwork, mainly on weekends or late nights. These replacement services are contracted out to a bus company by Sydney Trains. Because it is impossible for one bus company to provide enough buses, the company will then subcontract some of the work to other bus companies. The routes are defined by Sydney Trains, with route numbers consisting of one or two digits, optionally followed by "A" (usually indicates short working variant), then the train line the route replaces. Examples include 35T3, 61T8 etc.

== On Demand services ==
Since late 2017, a number of On Demand services have been introduced throughout the metropolitan and outer metropolitan bus regions. These are not part of the Opal card ticketing system and most do not accept concession fares. However, OpalPay and concession fares can be used and accepted on some of these services.

As of March 2020, the on demand services in Greater Sydney are:

- Central Coast on demand service – operated by Community Transport Central Coast's CoastConnect
- Edmondson Park on demand service – operated by Interline Bus Services' Interline Connect
- Inner West on demand service – operated by Transit Systems' Bridj
- Illawarra on demand service – operated by Premier Motor Service's Premier Illawarra On Demand (PODPI)
- Norwest on demand service – started May 2019 – operated by Hillsbus' MetroConnect
- Northern Beaches on demand service – started November 2017 – operated by Keolis Downer's Keoride
- The Ponds on demand service – started May 2019 – operated by Busways' Cooee Busways

Other on demand services have also been trialled but have since ceased, including:

- Bankstown on demand service – operated by Punchbowl Bus Company's Punchbowl On Demand (POD) – ceased 14 October 2018
- Carlingford and North Rocks on demand service – operated by Hillsbus' OurBus – ceased 24 May 2019
- Eastern Suburbs on demand service – operated by Bridj, formerly by Transdev's RIDE Plus until August 2018 – ceased 20 December 2019
- Macquarie Park on demand service – operated by Keolis Downer's Keoride – ceased 20 March 2020
- Manly on demand service – operated by RIDE Plus – ceased 24 May 2019
- Sutherland Shire on demand Service – operated by Transdev's Transdev Link ceased 17 November 2019
- Wetherill Park on demand service – operated by Bridj – ceased 3 August 2018

== Patronage ==
The following table lists patronage figures for the network of contract regions (in millions of journeys) during the corresponding financial year. Australia's financial years start on 1 July and end on 30 June. Major events that affected the number of journeys made or how patronage is measured are included as notes.

Bus patronage in Sydney by financial year
Year	2010–11	2011–12	2012–13	2013–14	2014–15	2015–16	2016–17	2017–18	2018–19	2019–20	2020–21	2021–22	2022–23
Patronage (millions)	198.7	203.3	204.6	209.0	232.0 (Note: Opal rollout completed in November 2014) (Note: Includes School Student Travel Scheme boardings and boardings on free shuttle services from January 2015)	—N/a	253.1 (Note: Figures from 2016–17 onwards are based on Opal tap on and tap off data. Non-Opal tickets were discontinued in August 2016.)	264.3	280.6	229.5 (Note: Patronage was lower than previous years due to people staying at home and not taking public transport to school or work during the COVID-19 pandemic)	125.9	112.4	206.8
Reference						—N/a							

View source data.

2024-25 Sydney bus patronage by contract region
Region 1	12,894,630	View source data.
Region 2	5,642,054	View source data.
Region 3	14,876,284	View source data.
Region 4	18,509,537	View source data.
Region 6	50,560,965	View source data.
Region 7	24,508,749	View source data.
Region 8	27,266,048	View source data.
Region 9	53,673,775	View source data.
Region 10	9,712,714	View source data.
Region 14	7,282,059	View source data.

2025 Transport for NSW patronage in Sydney by mode
Mode	Patronage	% of total
Metro	71,956,399	10.82
Train	284,972,638	42.84
Bus	242,983,455	36.53
Ferry	18,633,461	2.80
Light rail	46,640,237	7.01
Total	665,186,190	100.00

== Fleet ==
=== Bus types ===
As the Government has moved to a contestable contract model since the Unsworth report, so it has acquired a greater interest in the buses acquired to operate its routes. The NSW Government buys many of the new buses entering service in private operator fleets, and enjoys step-in rights where a private operator loses a contract. State Transit and the private operators must buy new vehicles from approved panel suppliers. These are Asia Motors, Bustech, Custom Denning, Custom Coaches, Heavy Vehicles Australia, Hino, Iveco, MAN, Scania, Volgren and Volvo.

The approved bus types are:

- 14.5-metre two-door city bus, with a combined seating and standing capacity of 80
- 18-metre articulated two- or three-door city bus, with a combined seating and standing capacity of 110
- 12-metre two-door double deck city bus, with a combined seating and standing capacity of 96–120
- 10-metre single-door 'mini' bus, with a combined seating and standing capacity of 40
- 12.5-metre single-door city bus, with a combined seating and standing capacity of 65
- 12.5-metre single-door school bus, with a combined seating and standing capacity of 70

In 2017, the government announced that articulated buses would be progressively phased out in favour of double-deckers.

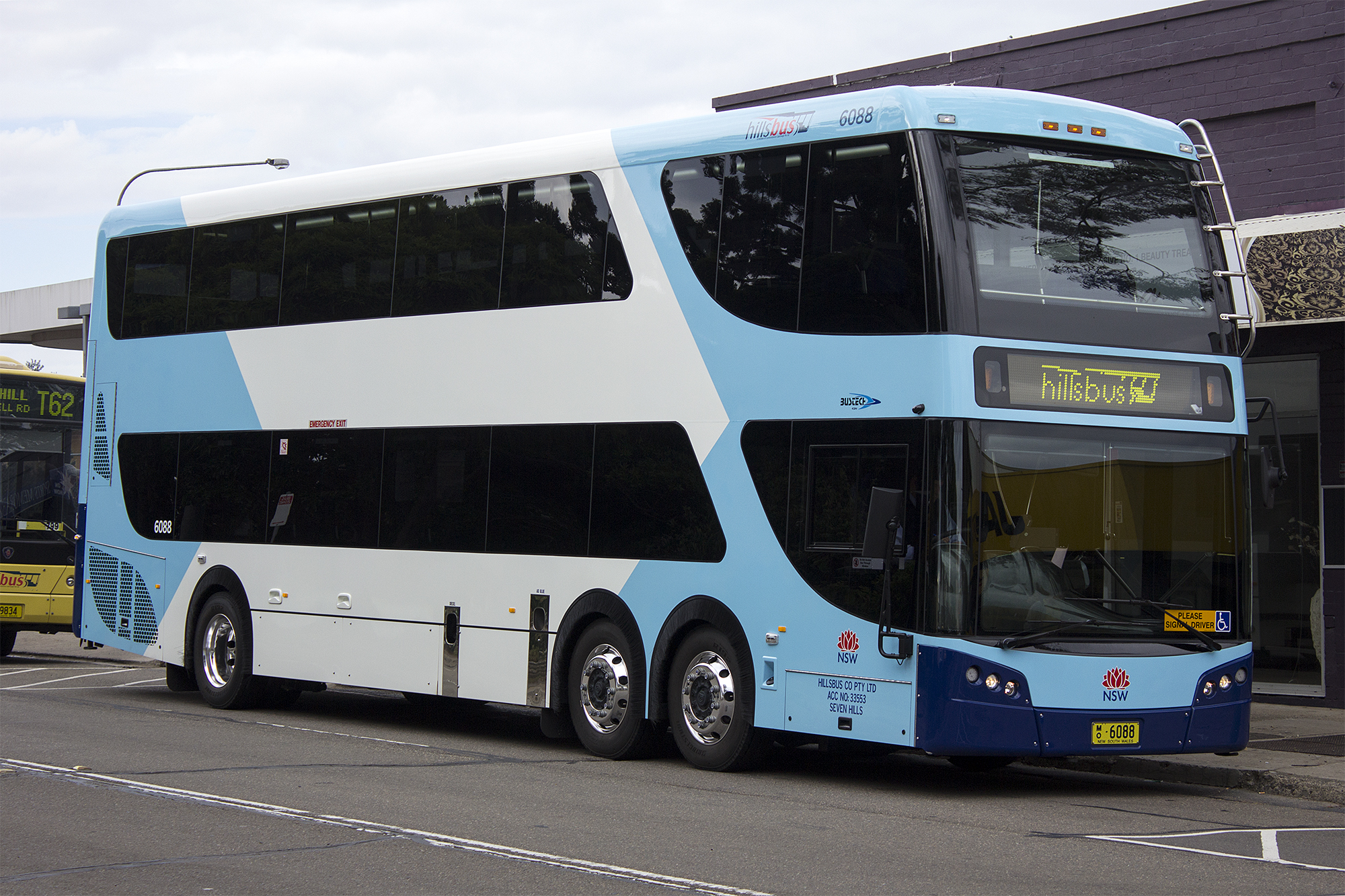

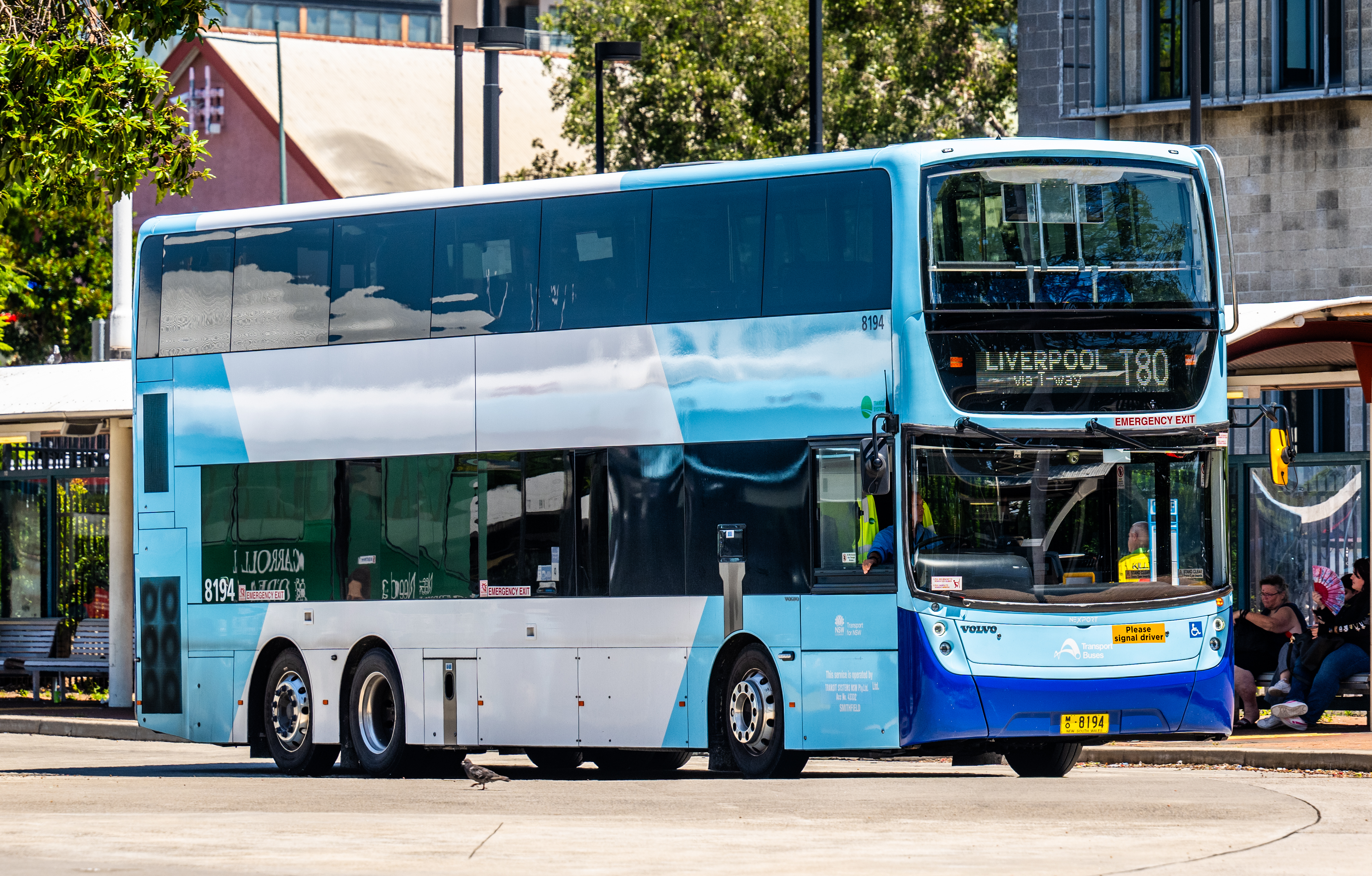

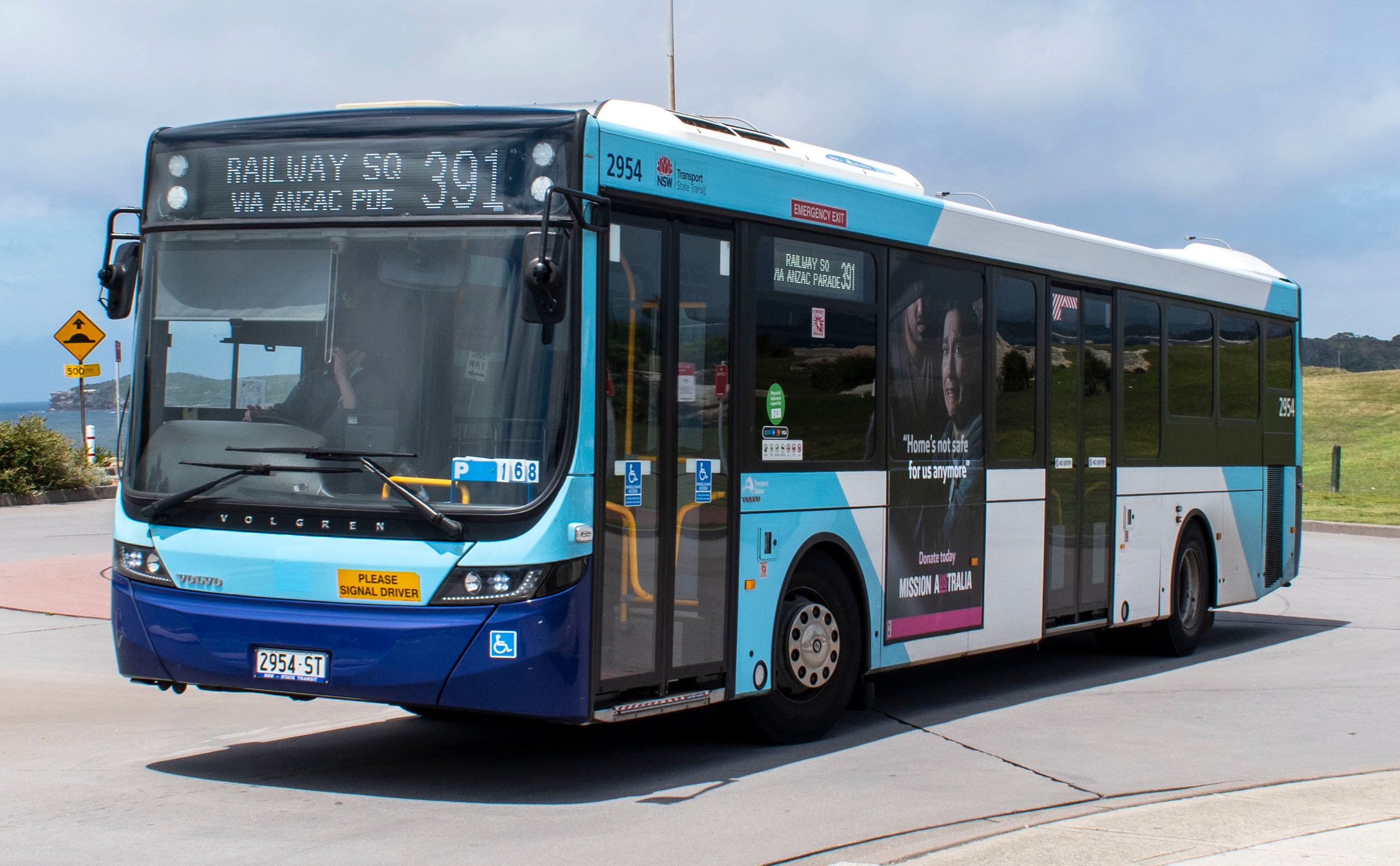

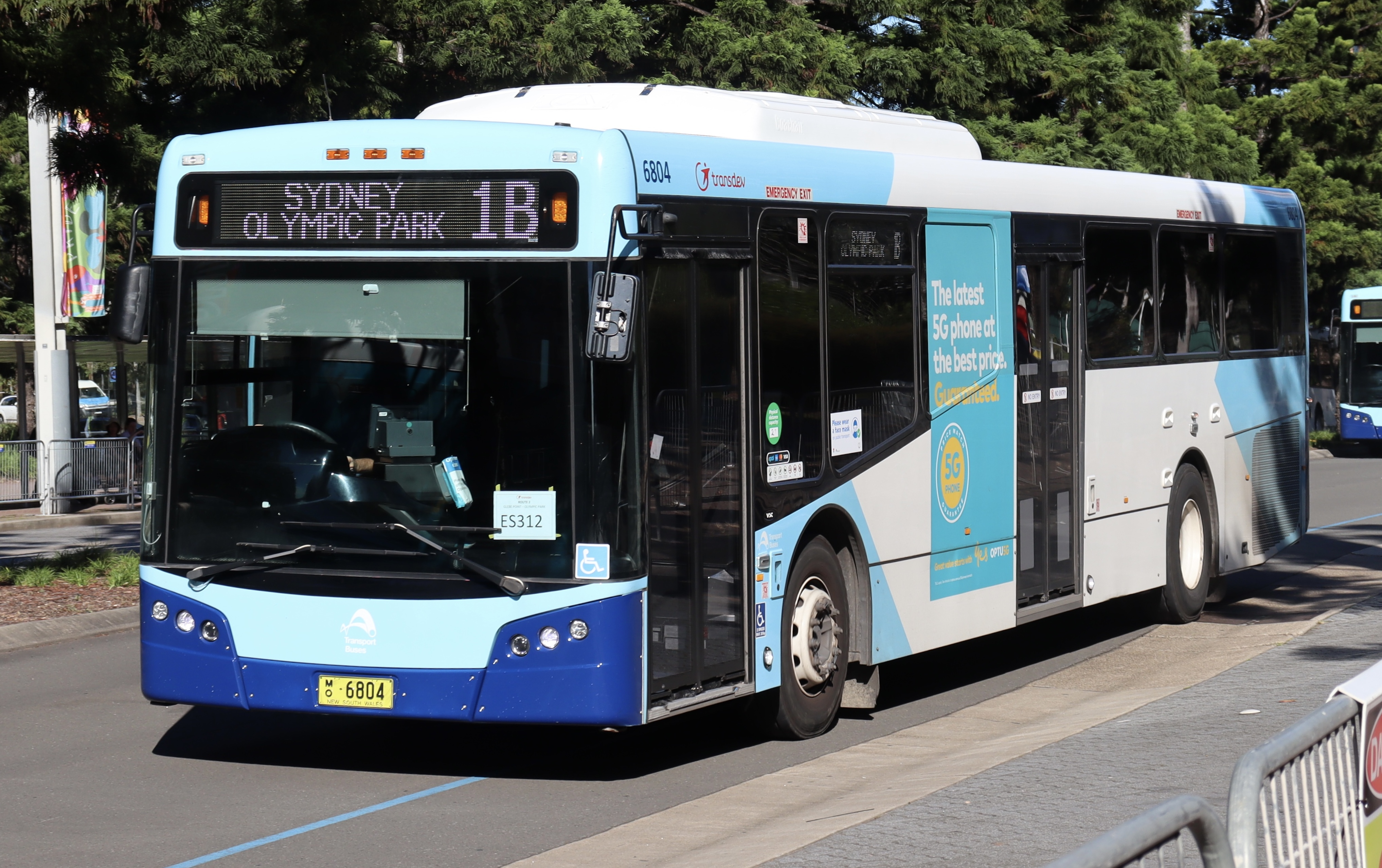

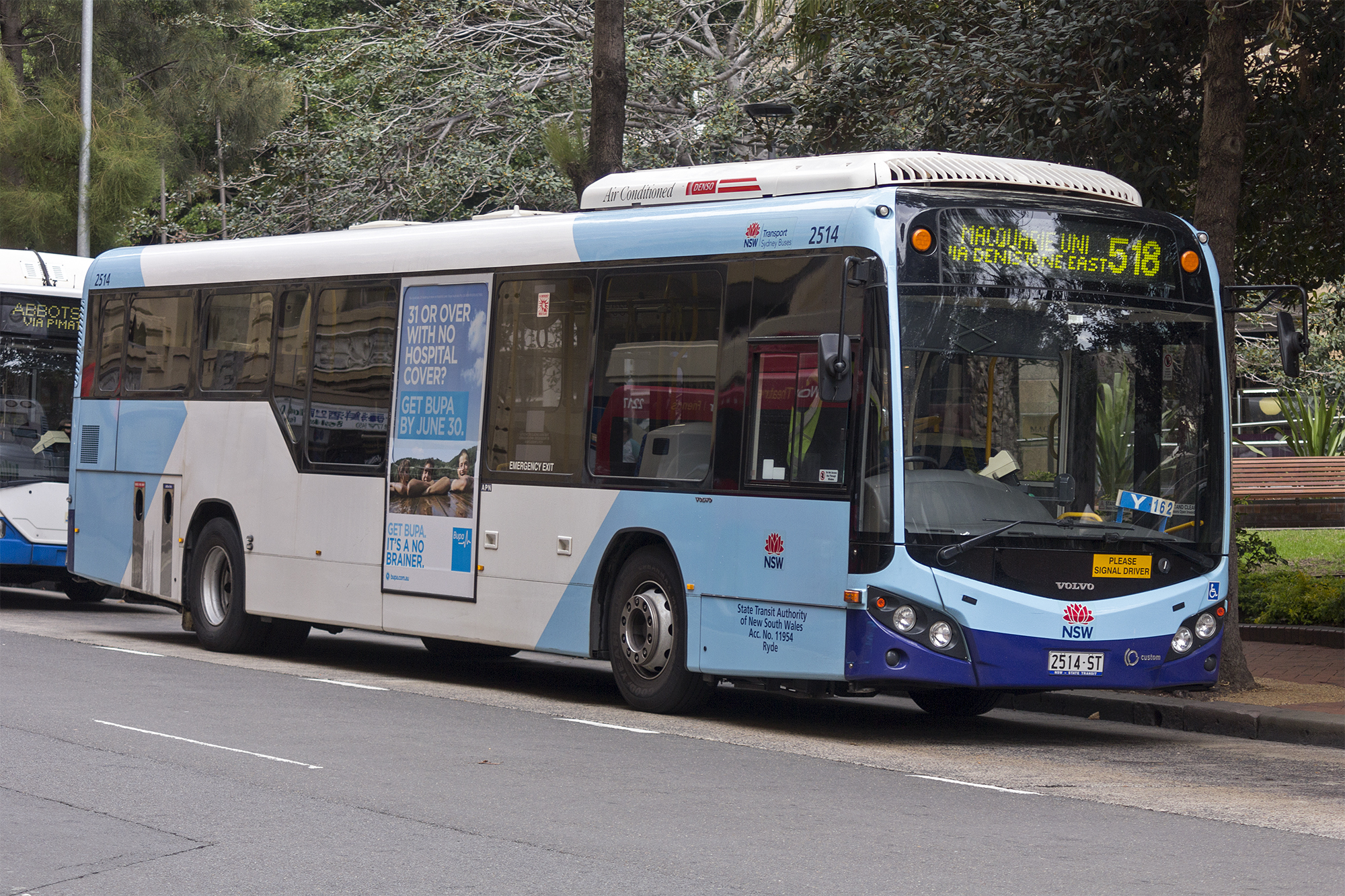
A Custom Coaches CB80 bodied Volvo B7RLE

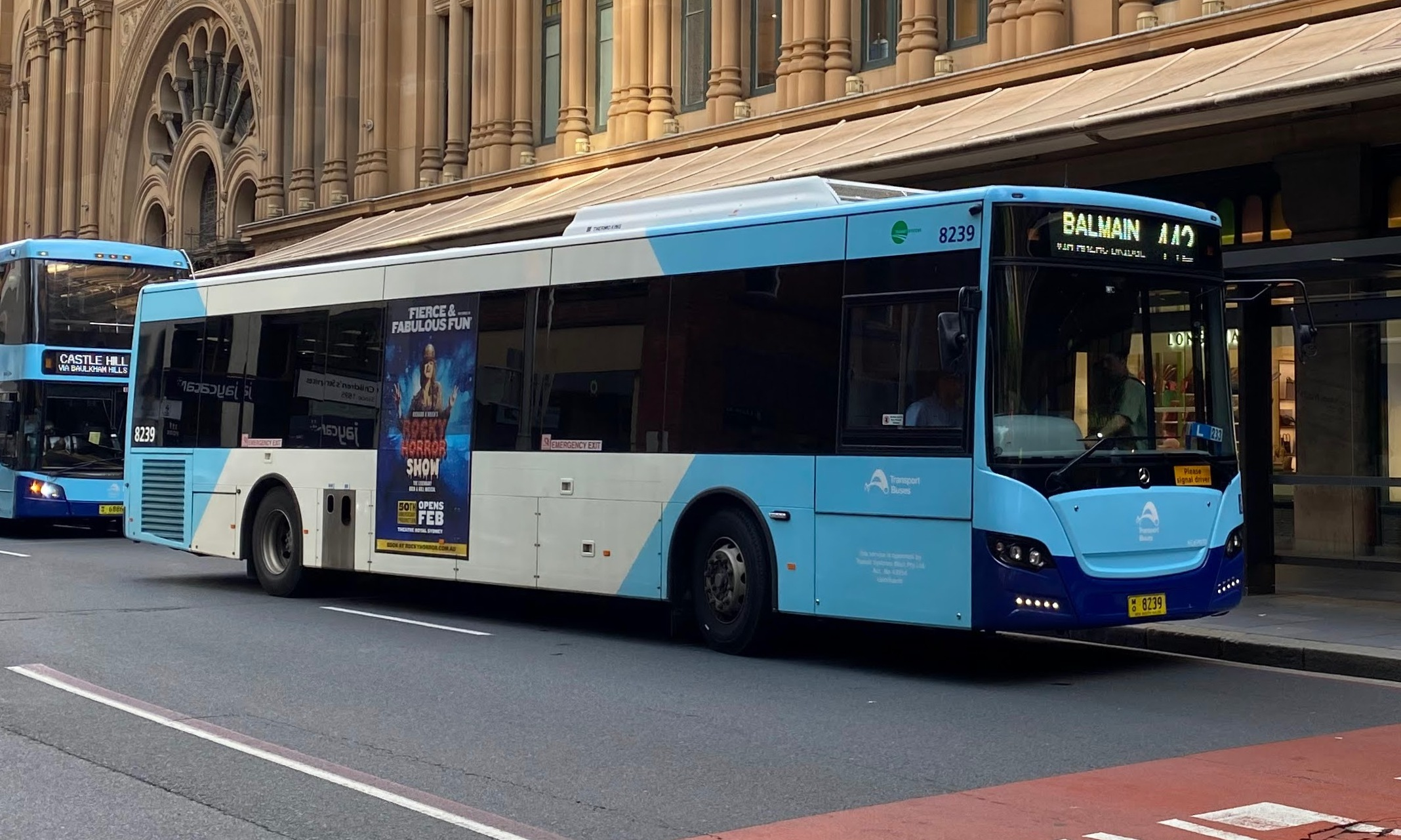
A Gemilang bodied Mercedes-Benz OC 500 LE operated by Transit Systems

=== Livery ===
Until 2010, each bus operator determined the livery for their vehicles. In late 2010, the NSW Government introduced a new livery for use on all new vehicles entering service on the network. The design is composed of a light blue (Pantone Matching System 297) background, a white chevron shape pointing in the direction of travel, and dark blue (Pantone Matching System 281) bumpers. Although there was some resistance from bus operators, including Forest Coach Lines, who feared losing their brand identity, all operators had accepted the new requirements by 2013.

== Bus priority infrastructure ==
The bus-only roads in Sydney

Many roads in Sydney have bus priority lanes. There are two types of bus lanes in Sydney;

- Bus Lane – For use by taxis, hire cars (Not rentals), motorcycles, bicycles, emergency vehicles and special purpose vehicles and vehicles also operated by or under the direction of Roads and Maritime Services.
- Bus Only Lane – For the exclusive use of buses and authorised special purpose vehicles. These are often used at traffic lights to allow buses to overtake queued traffic.

Many of them are operational for 24 hours, or during the peak hour. Cameras are often set up along bus lanes and drivers who break rules by driving along bus lanes at dedicated times are fined.

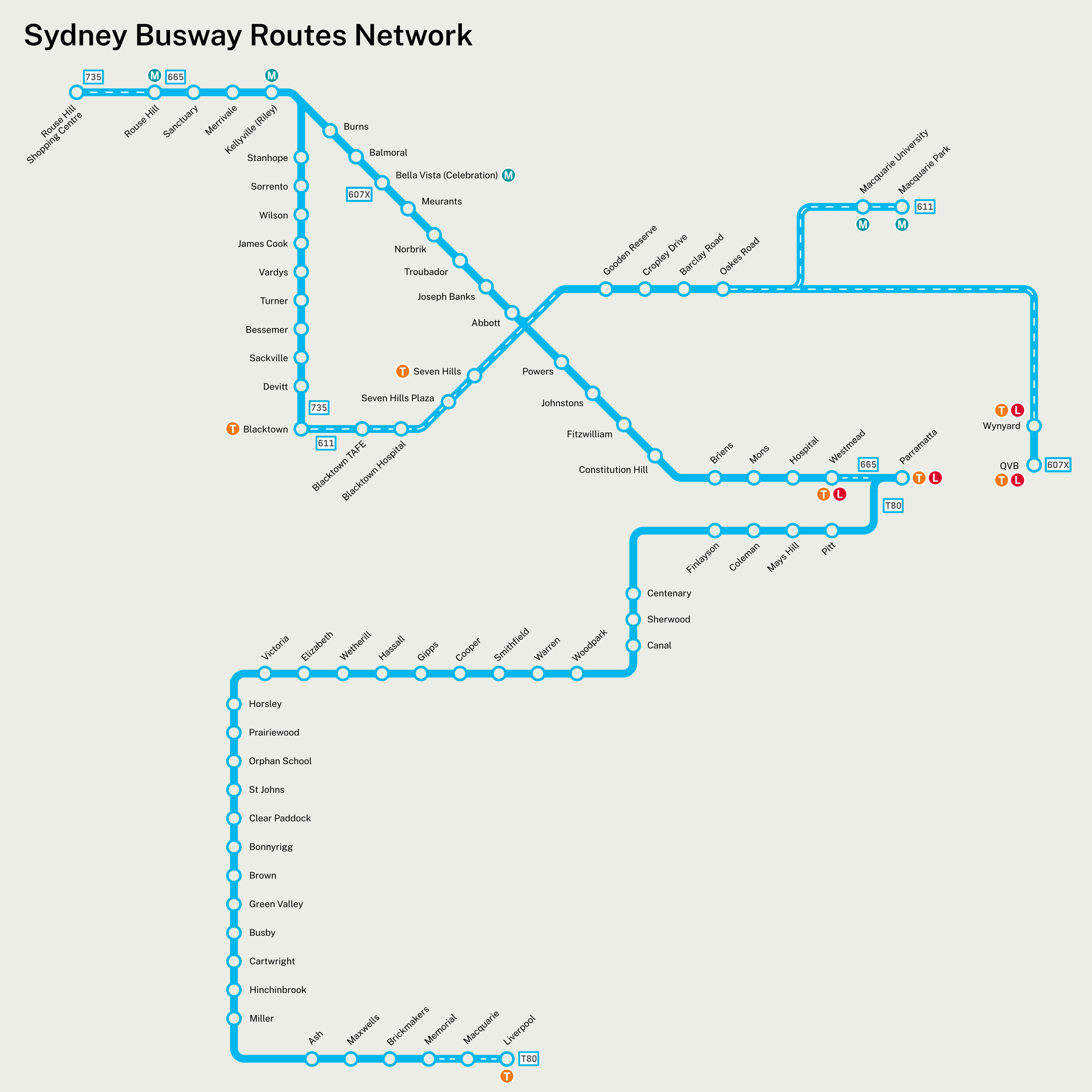
Map of bus routes that largely only utilise bus-only infrastructure.

Dedicated bus only roads include a separate road in Moore Park which shadows parts of Alison Road and Anzac Parade, as well as dedicated roadways at the centre of M2 Hills Motorway and T-ways.

Sydney has three operating transitways (or T-ways):

- The Liverpool–Parramatta T-way, opened in 2003
- The North-West T-way, opened in 2007
- Bennelong Bridge, opened in 2016

These T-ways can only be used by buses or authorised T-way vehicles. Cameras have been set up along the three T-ways and vehicles without authorised access are fined. For Bennelong Bridge, separate fines apply to cyclists using the T-way instead of the adjacent shared pedestrian path on the bridge.

== Ticketing and fares ==
The bus network uses the smartcard-based Opal ticketing system. Opal is also valid on metro, train, ferry and light rail services but separate fares apply for these modes. Opal's bus fares are the same as those for light rail but the fares are not combined when interchanging between the two modes. Bus drivers also sell non-smartcard Opal single trip tickets, however this facility has been withdrawn from bus regions 4, 7, 8 and 9. The single trip tickets are more expensive than the standard Opal fare. They are only valid for travel on the bus service on which they are purchased. The following table lists Opal fares for reusable smartcards and single trip tickets:

Bus or light rail
As of 14 July 2025	0–3 km	3–8 km	>8 km
Adult cards & contactless (peak)	$3.30	$4.49	$5.77
Adult cards & contactless (off-peak)	$2.31	$3.14	$4.03
Other cards (peak)	$1.65	$2.24	$2.88^
Other cards (off-peak)	$1.15	$1.56	$2.01
Adult single trip	$4.00	$5.40	$6.90
Child/Youth single trip	$2.00	$2.70	$3.40

^ = $2.50 for Senior/Pensioner cardholders
