= Parramatta Town Hall =

Venue in New South Wales, Australia

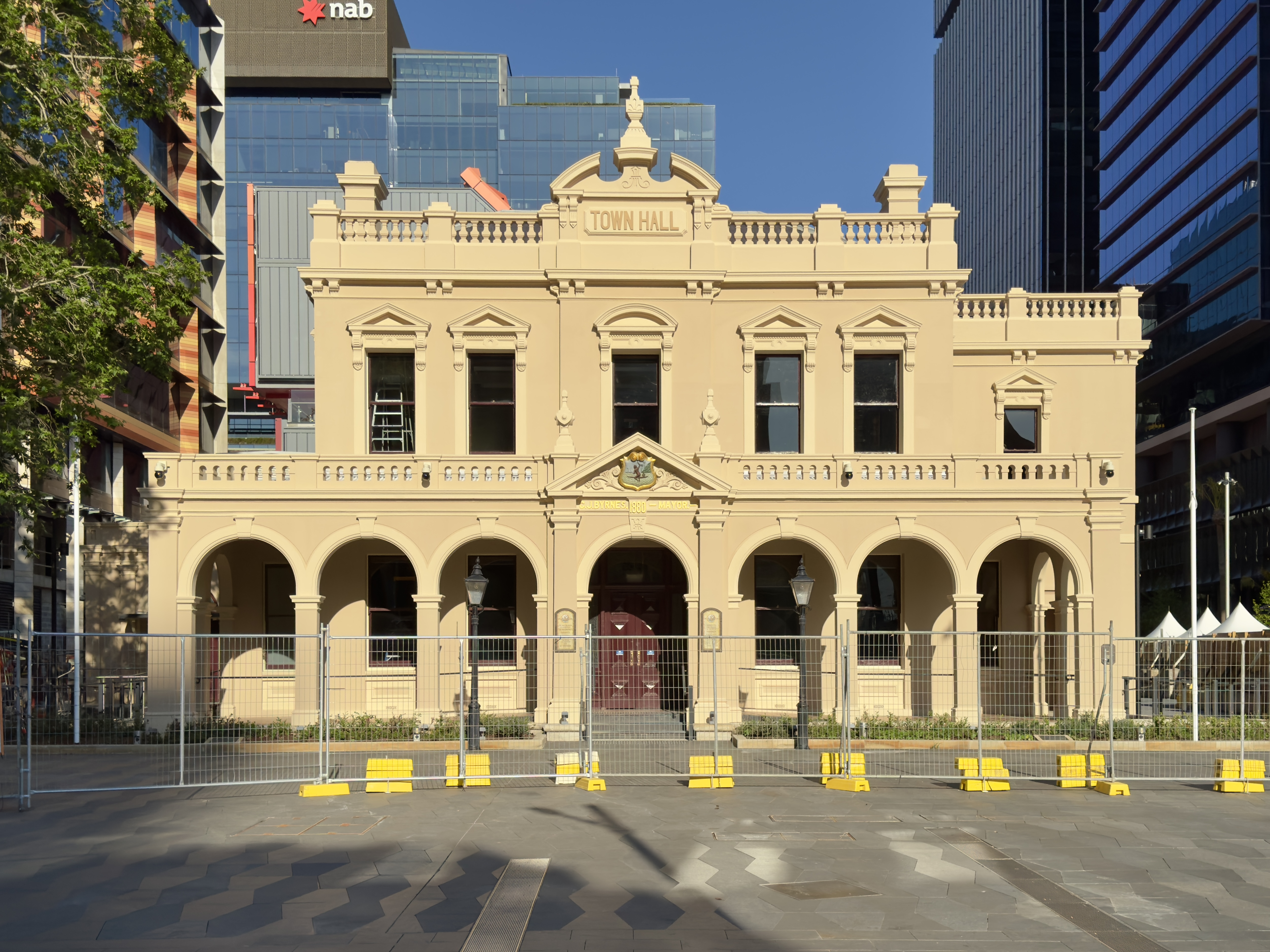
- Parramatta Town Hall, pictured in 2023
- Interactive map of the Parramatta Town Hall area

General information
- Status: Completed
- Type: Town hall
- Architectural style: Victorian Free Classical
- Location: 182 Church Street, Parramatta, New South Wales, Australia
- Coordinates: 33°48′57″S 151°0′13″E
- Construction started: 1881
- Opened: 1883
- Renovated: 1913
- Cost: A£2,300
- Owner: City of Parramatta

Technical details
- Floor count: Two

Design and construction
- Architect: G. A. Mansfield
- Main contractor: Herbert Coates (Hart & Lavors)

Other information
- Seating capacity: 300 (theatre style) or 200 (dinner)
- Number of rooms: Four

Website
- Official website

Register of the National Estate
- Official name: Town Hall, 182 Church St, Parramatta, NSW, Australia
- Type: Historic
- Designated: 21 March 1978
- Part of: Defunct register
- Reference no.: 3086

New South Wales Heritage Database (Local Government Register)
- Official name: Town Hall and Potential Archaeological Site; Parramatta Town Hall and Potential Archaeological Site
- Type: Built
- Criteria: a., c., f., g.
- Designated: 20 August 1999
- Reference no.: Local register
- Group/collection: Community Facilities
- Category: Town Hall

The Parramatta Town Hall is a heritage-listed town hall located in the Greater Western Sydney suburb of Parramatta, New South Wales, Australia. Designed by Messrs Blackmann and Parkes in the Victorian Free Classical architectural style, the town hall was completed in 1883 at a cost of A£2,300 to serve as the town hall and municipal chamber for the Borough of Parramatta.

Parramatta Town Hall has undergone a recent upgrade, with the City of Parramatta overseeing the adaptive reuse of the iconic building's unique architectural merits, whilst adding contemporary touches that offer an air of modern comfort for this landmark venue.

== History ==
Established by passage of the Parramatta Town Hall Act of 1878 (NSW) and given assent on 4 February 1879, the Town Hall is listed on the (now defunct) Register of the National Estate and as a local government listing on the New South Wales Heritage Database. The Town Hall was officially opened on 30 August 1873.

Parramatta Town Hall was originally identified and marked out by Australia's first Governor, Arthur Phillip in 1792. In 1870, Mayor John Good recognised the necessity for a dedicated Town Hall in Parramatta, envisioning a central building for entertainment, concerts, and meetings. Nine years later, the council established Parramatta Town Hall, replacing the marketplace formerly used for public activities including cattle sales and agricultural shows.

Parramatta's municipal buildings were completed in two stages, with the practical need for Council Chambers taking precedence over the ceremonial desire for a Town Hall. Mayor Charles Byrnes, who fittingly has a room named after him at Parramatta Town Hall, had the honour of laying the foundation stone for the Council Chambers on 19 November 1879 and the building was officially opened in August 1881.

In September 1882, the foundation stone for the Town Hall was laid, led by architects the Mansfield brothers and builders Herbert Coates of Parramatta.

The completed Parramatta Town Hall officially opened in 1883, with the first public use of the venue epitomising the aims of its construction hosting a community event presented by the Parramatta Glee Club that also revealed the municipality's aspiration to be a place of fashion and high culture.

Further additions were made to Parramatta Town Hall in 1932 with architect Benjamin Dunsmore McDonald including a meeting room and office additions at the southern frontage of the building. Seamlessly blending the past with the present, the Town Hall has retained its original features, reflecting its local heritage significance.

Since its first public use in 1883 by the Parramatta Glee Club, Parramatta Town Hall has been a backdrop to a variety of performances, meetings, and activities. The walls of Parramatta Town Hall bears marks from the past and echoes of its rich history, welcoming travelling dramatic companies, playing host to the annual Butcher's Ball and even hosting Australian icon, journalist, and author A B (Banjo) Paterson for his lecture about the Boer War.

Throughout its history, Parramatta Town Hall has played host to a multitude of exciting events including plays, civic receptions, flag-raising ceremonies, bridal expos, and festival performances. In 1955, the world-famous Trapp Family Singers — the inspiration behind The Sound of Music — graced the halls of Parramatta Town Hall. In 2016, Parramatta Town Hall was the backdrop for Australian singer Delta Goodrem and American rap artist Gizzle's, music video for the song titled "Enough" representing its prestigious appeal, striking architectural features and cultural significance.

== Design ==
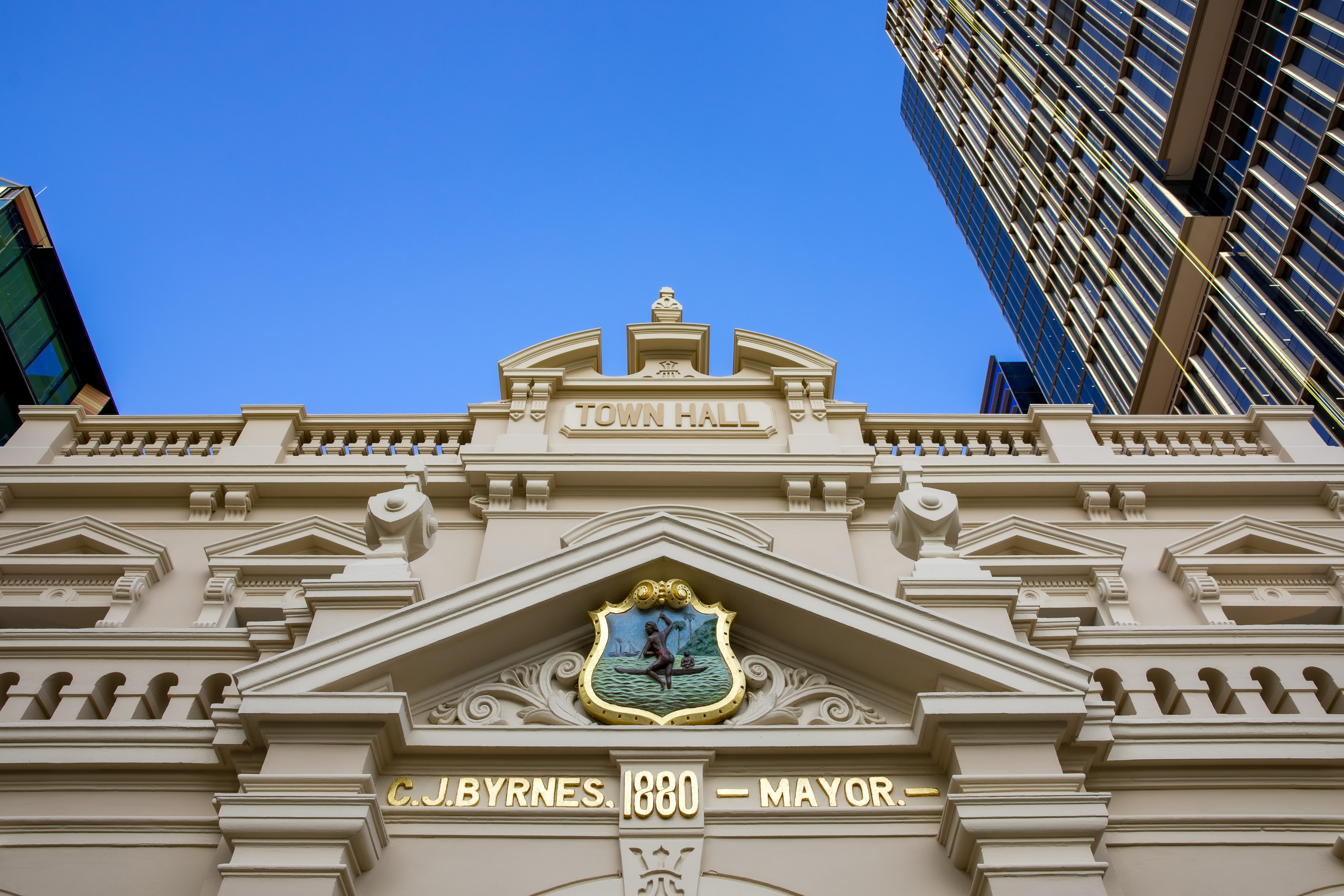
Exterior

Parramatta Town Hall was built in an architectural style used throughout Australia for various civic buildings, banks and theatres throughout the nineteenth century, known as 'Victorian Free Classical'. Blending architectural styles from a variety of European countries and historical periods, Town Hall drew inspiration from English country houses, French chateaus and Italian churches.

The Sydney architectural firm, the Mansfield brothers were selected for the design of the Council Chambers and Parramatta Town Hall. The Mansfield Brothers made significant contributions to the architectural landscape of New South Wales, designing many public and commercial buildings including the Redfern Town Hall and Abercrombie House in Bathurst, making them a fitting choice to design Parramatta's new civic and community landmark.

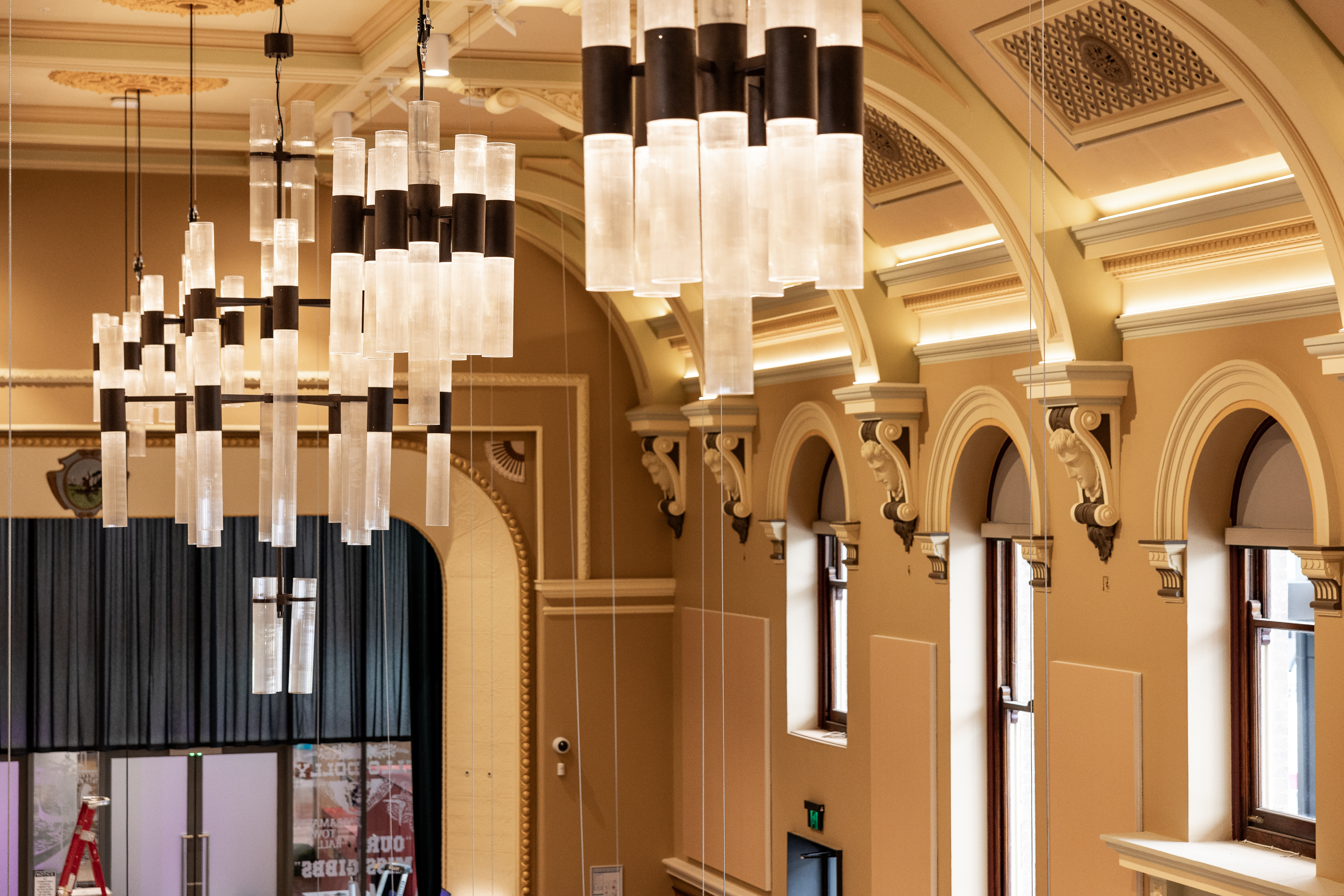
Inside Parramatta Town Hall

Constructed as a two-storey building, Parramatta Town Hall incorporates Victorian Free Classical elements, with grand ceilings, stone foundations, walls of stuccoed brickwork and double-hung sash windows with deep mouldings under the sills along the primary façade.

== Upgrade ==
Parramatta Town Hall was upgraded between 2020 and 2022, with restoration and conservation works to restore original features, and enhancements to meet contemporary standards and expectations.

The extensive, adaptive reuse project included the addition of light-filled modern glass atrium that directly opens onto the vibrant Parramatta Square, and integration with 5 Parramatta Square (PHIVE), a community, cultural and civic hub completed in 2022.

The project led by City of Parramatta, drew on the design expertise of award-winning French architect Manuelle Gautrand in partnership with Australian architecture firms Lacoste + Stevenson and Design Inc, along with heritage specialists TKD Architects and Australian construction group Built.

== See also ==
- List of town halls in Sydney
- Architecture of Sydney
