= Sydney bus route 144 =

Bus route in Sydney, Australia

144
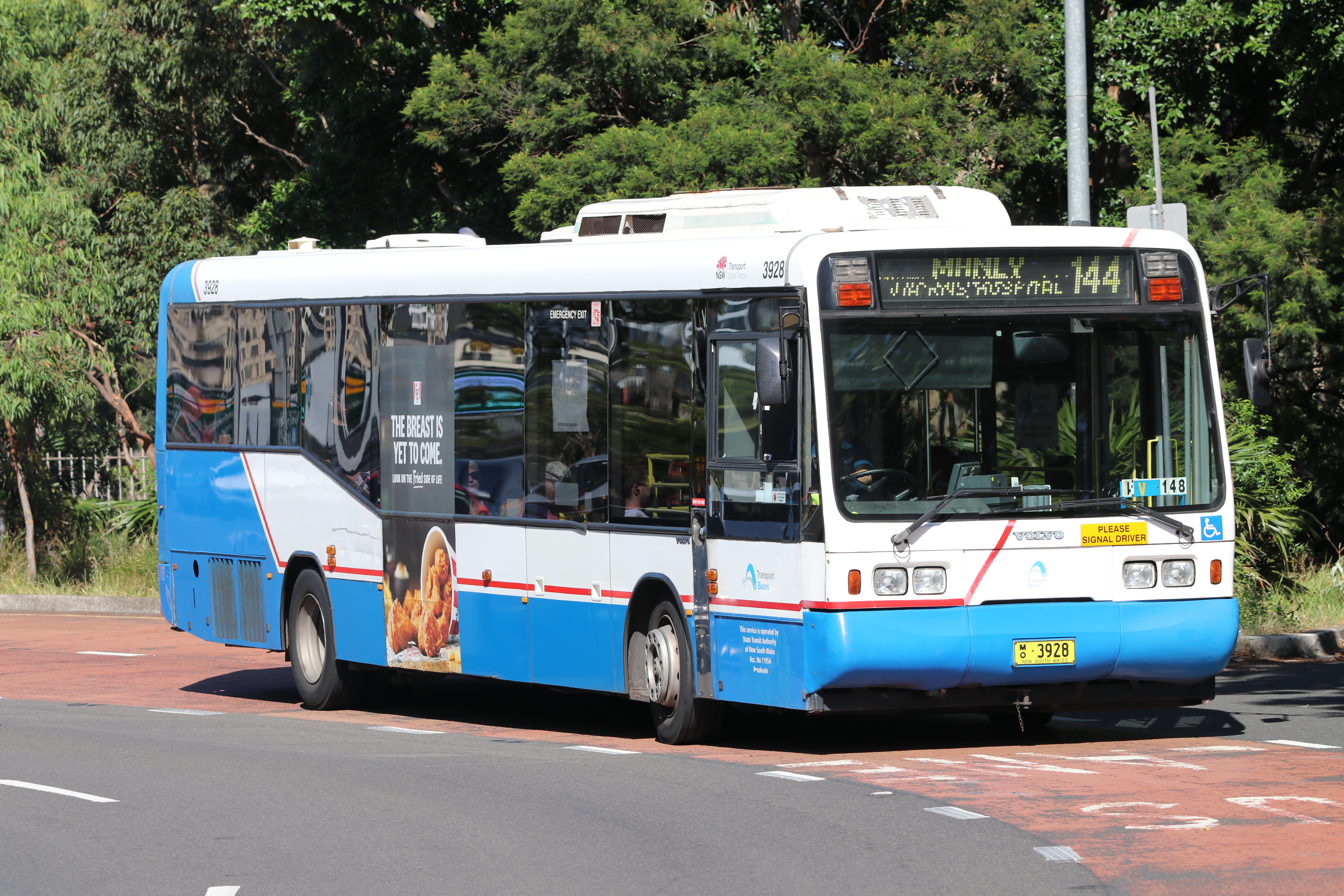
- State Transit Volvo B10BLE at Neutral Bay in December 2020

Overview
- Operator: Keolis Northern Beaches
- Depot: Brookvale; North Sydney
- Former operators: State Transit; Urban Transit Authority; Public Transport Commission; Department of Government Transport

Route
- Start: Manly wharf
- Via: The Spit; Neutral Bay; Crows Nest; St Leonards
- End: Chatswood station
- Length: 16 kilometres
- Timetable: Transport for NSW

Sydney bus route 144 is operated by Keolis Northern Beaches between Manly wharf and Chatswood station. It was Sydney's first government operated bus route.

== History ==
In the late 1920s, White Transit Company commenced operating route 144 between Manly wharf and Cremorne Junction where it connected with tram services. It ceased on 31 October 1931, when White Transit Company were forced out of business by the Transport (Co-ordination) Act 1931 with its services deemed to be in competition with tram services, which the act prohibited.

On 25 December 1932, the service was recommenced by the Government of New South Wales, with buses initially hired from White Transit Company. The service was an instant success with over 2,000 passengers carried on the first day alone.

Route 144 has been extended multiple times from its original terminus at Cremorne Junction. On 1 April 1933, route 144 was extended to St Leonards, on 15 April 1965 to Royal North Shore Hospital. and on 11 September 1988 to Chatswood station. From 20 December 2020, route 144 ceased to divert via Royal North Shore Hospital. At the same time overnight services commenced as route 144N, but only between Manly Wharf and North Sydney.

In October 2021 it was included in the takeover of region 8 by Keolis Northern Beaches.

In January 2025, the overnight service 144N ceased and was replaced by additional overnight services daily on route 144. The latter will become a 24-hour service which will operate the full journey between Manly and Chatswood.

== Current route ==
Route 144 operates via these primary locations:

- Manly wharf
- Balgowlah
- The Spit
- Cremorne
- Neutral Bay
- Crows Nest
- St Leonards station
- Gore Hill
- Artarmon
- Chatswood station
