= Manuelle Gautrand =

French architect (born 1961)

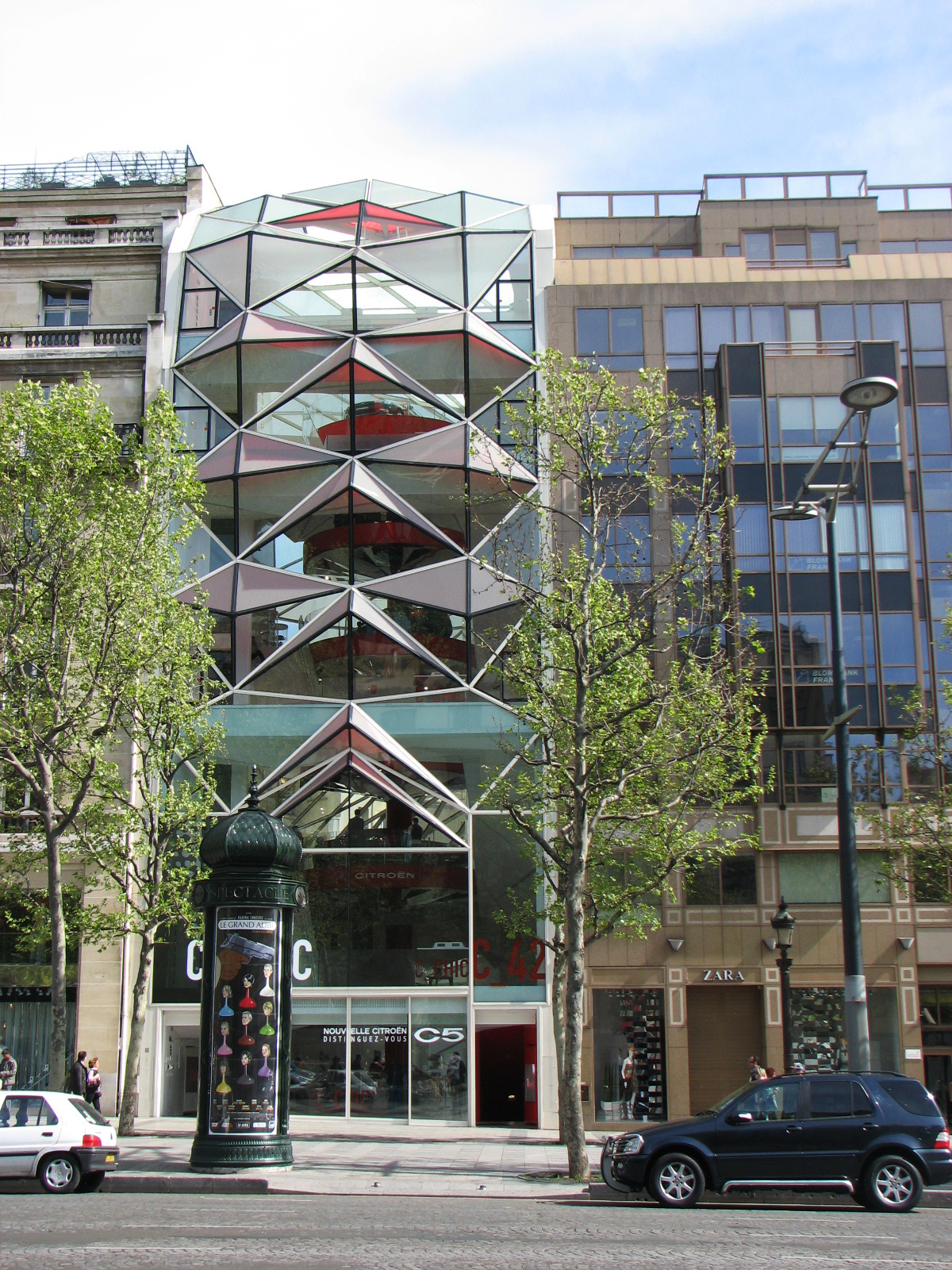
Manuelle Gautrand: Espace Citroën, Champs-Élysées, Paris

Manuelle Gautrand (born 1961) is a French architect.

== Biography ==
After setting up her own firm in Lyon in 1991, Gautrand moved to Paris in 1993. She has completed projects of various types from housing and office buildings to cultural and leisure developments. Her C42 Citroën showroom on the Champs-Élysées brought her international recognition. In 2008, she converted the Gaîté-Lyrique Theatre into a centre for modern music and digital arts and received a commission for the AVA Tower at La Défense. Internationally, she has designed a car showroom in Cairo and has recently taken part in the competition for the new Munch Museum in Oslo.

Between 2000 and 2003, Gautrand taught at the Ecole Spéciale d’Architecture and at the School of Architecture in Val de Seine. She frequently takes part in architecture workshops across Europe. In 2009, she taught at the Vienna University of Technology and in 2010 at the Florida International University School of Architecture.

== Selected works ==
Among Manuelle Gautrand's principal works are:

- Conversion of the Gaîté-Lyrique Theatre into an interactive platform for music and the arts (2008–2011)
- Extension to the Lille Métropole Museum of Modern, Contemporary and Outsider Art at Villeneuve d'Ascq (2003–2009)
- Administration centre in Saint-Étienne (2006–2009)
- Citroën C42 showroom, Champs-Élysées, Paris (2002–2007)
- Solaris residential complex in Rennes (2002–2006)
- AVA Tower, La Défense, Paris (construction began 2010)

== Recognition ==
In 2010, Gautrand became a chevalier of the Légion d'Honneur. In 2005, she was elected a member of the French Académie d'architecture. In 2002, she was awarded the Academy's Silver Medal. In 2017 and 2018, she was a Prix Versailles World Judge.

== Literature ==
- Accorsi, Florence: Ré-enchanter la ville: architectures de Manuelle Gautrand / Re-enchant the city, Paris, ICI interface. ISBN 978-2-916977-05-8.
- Ardenne, Paul: Manuelle Gautrand: architectures, Éditions Infolio, 2005. ISBN 978-3-7643-7286-6.
- Gautrand, Manuelle, and Sophie Roulet. 2007. “Does Architecture Have a Gender?: Manuelle Gautrand.” A10: New European Architecture, no. 16 (July): 18–20.
- “Manuelle Gautrand - Architecture.” Accessed October 25, 2021. http://manuelle-gautrand.com/.
- World Architecture Community. “Manuelle Gautrand Wins the 2017 European Prize for Architecture.” Accessed October 25, 2021. https://worldarchitecture.org/architecture-news/cvgec/manuelle-gautrand-wins-the-2017-european-prize-for-architecture.html.
