= Prince Alfred Square =

Reserve in Parramatta, Australia

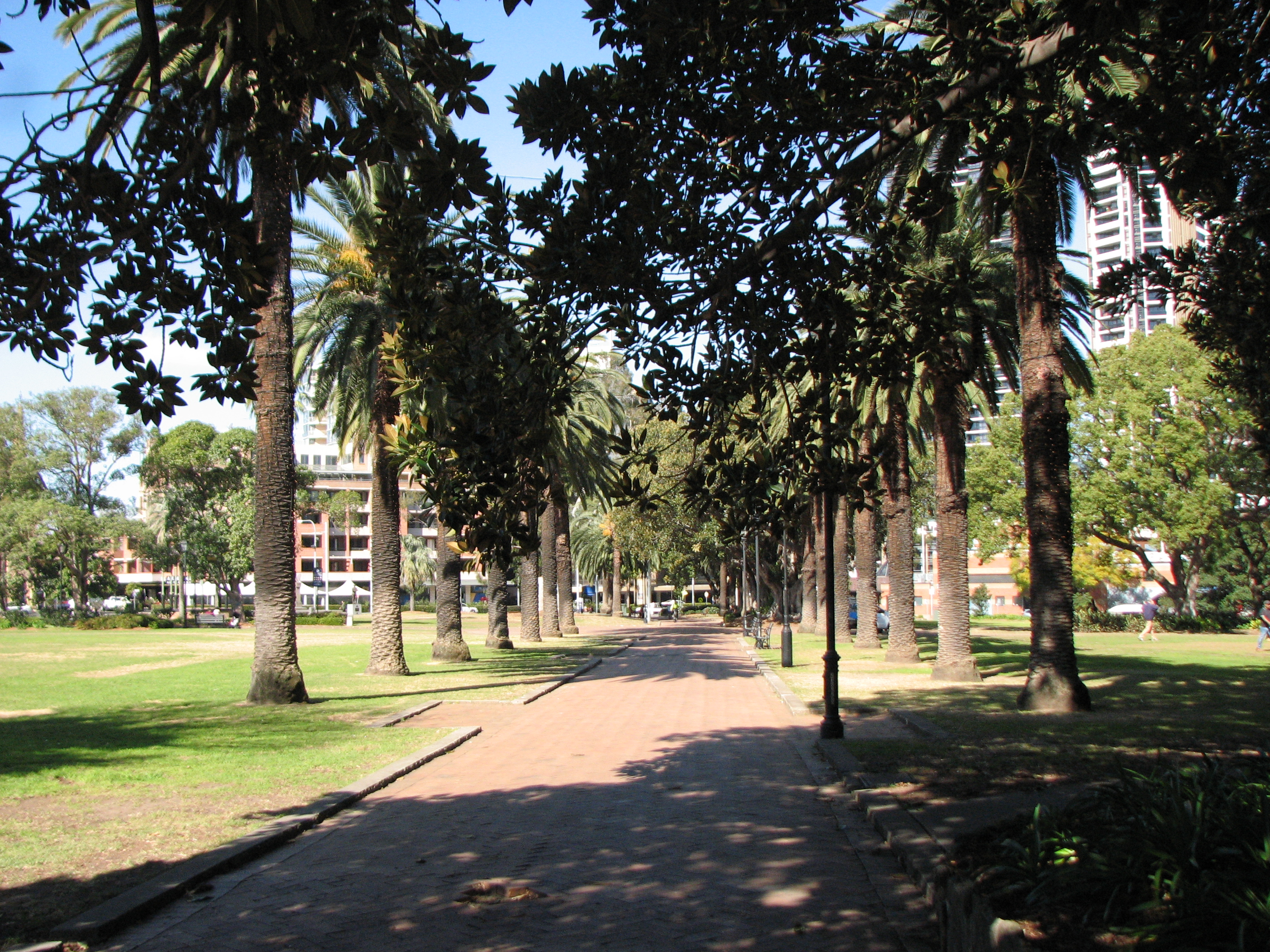
- Prince Alfred Square

- Location within Sydney
- Type: Urban park
- Location: Parramatta, New South Wales
- Coordinates: 33°48′33″S 151°00′16″E
- Area: 1.5 ha (3.7 acres)
- Authorized: 27 November 1837
- Founder: Governor Richard Bourke
- Owner: NSW Government
- Manager: City of Parramatta Council
- Status: Open all year
- Public transit: Prince Alfred Square light rail

New South Wales Heritage Register
- Type: Landscape
- Criteria: a., b., c., e., f., g.
- Designated: 28 August 2017
- Reference no.: 01997

Prince Alfred Square is a 1.5-hectare (3.7-acre) park on the northern side of the Parramatta River in the central business district of Parramatta. It is one of the oldest public parks in New South Wales and is listed on the New South Wales State Heritage Register. St Patrick's Cathedral is located directly opposite the square to the west.

The park site was the site of Parramatta's second gaol (1804–1841) and first female factory (1804–1821). Prisoners were transferred to the new Parramatta Gaol upon opening in 1842 and the gaol was subsequently demolished. It was authorised as a "village green" for the people of Parramatta by Governor Bourke on 27 November 1837, and was referred to as the old Gaol Green or Hanging Green by local townspeople. A perimeter fence was subsequently erected and games such as cricket were played.

The oldest plantings in the park include Moreton Bay figs, a camphor laurel and a bunya pine that date from the mid Victorian period (c.1869–70s). It was named "Alfred Square" in 1868 to commemorate the visit of Prince Alfred, Australia's first Royal visitor, during which he visited Parramatta.

It was added to the New South Wales State Heritage Register on 28 August 2017.

== History ==
=== Occupation of Parramatta by the Aboriginal peoples ===
Aboriginal people have occupied the Parramatta region for tens of thousands of years. Evidence of their occupation can be found in the form of rock shelters with deposits, open campsites, middens, axe-grinding groove sites, scarred trees, hand stencils and drawings. In pre-colonial times, Parramatta would have been very attractive to Aboriginal people as the landscape would have supported a wide variety of plant and animal life. The City of Parramatta is located on Parramatta River at what is effectively the head of Sydney Harbour. Permanent fresh water was available in the river upstream of the tidal limit and fresh water would also have been available from creeks and surface waterholes, in more clayey parts of the sand terrace. Aboriginal people living in this location would have had access to freshwater and saltwater food resources such as: ducks, eels, shellfish, crayfish, fish and turtles. Terrestrial resources in the Parramatta area included woodland and grassland mammals such as: kangaroos, possums and flying foxes. The grassy woodlands would also have provided access to smaller animals and insects and to native fruits, berries, seeds, yams and roots.

Parramatta CBD, at the time of European settlement, is thought to have been the territorial lands of the Burramattagal (also spelt Boromedegal, Boora me di-gal, Booramedegal and Burramedigal). The Burramattagal appear to have belonged to a larger cultural group that extended across western Sydney, although exact language group affiliations of pre-contact groups in the Parramatta region is open to some debate. Much of our knowledge about the traditional life style of Aboriginal people living in the Parramatta CBD area is reliant on archaeological investigation, as the Burramatta People (as a distinct population group) disappeared very soon after European settlement of the area.

European settlers, attracted to Parramatta for its fertile soils and its suitability for water transport, began arriving in the region in the late 18th Century. Parramatta quickly became the focus of residential, commercial and industrial development. The establishment of the town of Parramatta and cultivation of the surrounding land, would have resulted in many Aboriginal sites being disturbed or destroyed without being recorded. To date only a relatively few Aboriginal sites have been recorded in the Parramatta local government area.

It is believed the site of Prince Alfred Square was a Burramatta women's site.

=== Early colonial history ===
This area is indicated as the site of Governor Phillip's government farm "Land in Cultivation" on a plan of Parramatta c. 1790. The Government Farm was run by superintendent Henry Dodd, and produced some of the first successful crops in the colony. It is uncertain how long this portion of land remained under cultivation before it was chosen as the site of Parramatta's permanent gaol in 1802.

In 1796, Governor John Hunter was committed to building much-wanted gaols in Sydney and Parramatta. Lack of masons and the need for urgent action convinced him to build in double log and thatch and he issued a "General Order" which required every settler and householder to furnish and deliver "ten logs weekly each". The first formal gaol in Parramatta was in George Street was probably complete by May 1797. The construction of the 100 ft long building was basic but the plan, with individual cells for prisoners (twenty-two), was up with the latest English concept. It was destroyed by fire on 28 December 1799.

Construction of a new Parramatta Gaol finally began in August 1802. It was located on the north side of the river, slightly away from the town, on what is now the Prince Alfred Square/Market Street site. The plan was a modest variant of an army barrack; a symmetrical plan with a central transverse corridor and wards to the left and right and cells at both ends with external access. The rear wall of the gaol formed part of the perimeter wall so there was no external access. The construction of the gaol was the responsibility of Rev Samuel Marsden. Of all the early ashlar stone buildings in NSW, the second Parramatta Gaol was probably the one that deteriorated the most rapidly and required the most frequent repair and reconstruction.

At some time during construction, Governor King decided to add a "linen and woollen manufactory" to the gaol. The layout of the complex consisted of two functionally separate precincts; gaol to the south and factory to the north. Access to the second floor factory was via a yard that also contained auxiliary workrooms and sheds set against the perimeter wall, and was the domain of female convicts. The gaol and factory was completed in 1804. Poorly constructed of sandstone for the ground floor of the Gaol and timber upper floor for the Factory, with a sandstone perimeter wall. Sheds and subsidiary buildings used as work areas, particularly as "rope walks" for spinning flax rope.

The second floor of the second gaol built at that location " a two-storey stone structure consisting of two, 80 by 20 foot (5.5 by 6 metre) rooms " was allocated to female convicts and was called "The factory above the gaol". It was a wool and linen factory where women worked by day and it served as their refuge by night. From its inception, then, the factory was intended to be a place where women who had not been immediately assigned to masters upon arrival in New South Wales were gainfully employed in tasks that were beneficial to the colony, and where corrupting influences could be kept at bay. In reality, this space was inadequate for achieving all of its aims as the majority of factory women could not find shelter there.

Floggings took place within the gaol yard and executions took place outside the gaol, probably in the empty ground to the north of the complex. Stocks at the entrance were used to punish minor offenders. Hangings took place at the gaol from 1804 -c. 1829, including on 8 March 1804 three men identified as ringleaders in the Castle Hill convict rebellion (Battle of Vinegar Hill) - convicts Samuel Hughs, Samuel Humes and John Place, as well as free settler Charles Hill for his participation in the rebellion. Samuel Humes was also gibbeted, in which the body is hung in chains from the gallows as a deterrence to others.

The factory continued to function until December 1807 when both factory and gaol were damaged by fire.

The factory reopened in May 1809. The following decades included a series of reports regarding the structural deficiencies of the building.

A larger space for the women was not forthcoming until 1817 when Governor Macquarie started arranging the design and construction of a new purpose-built barracks for female convicts. In 1821 the women were transferred to the new Parramatta Female Factory designed by Francis Greenway and located further up the Parramatta River on land previously granted to Governor Bligh.

Before 1823 James Williamson had the area on a lease.

By 1830, Major Lockyer applied for land near the gaol on behalf of the School of Industry for the site of an institution, but Surveyor-General Major Thomas Mitchell opposed the alienation of the land for this purpose. In 1833, the gaol was described as in a "falling state". Rather than undertaking major work, the building was shored up until a new gaol could be built.

=== Victorian history ===
In 1837, Governor Bourke decided that the land should be measured for a reserve for the townspeople. It was authorised as a "village green" on 27 November 1837 and covered an area of more than three acres. Locals still referred to it as Gaol Green or Hanging Green.

From 1836–39 Lennox Bridge was built nearby, linking Church Street north and south.

In 1842 the new Parramatta Gaol opened and all prisoners are transferred from the old gaol.

The land was levelled and fenced but complaints were made in 1853 that this ground which was set aside as a promenade was being used as a rubbish dump. The difficulty of maintaining and developing communal spaces was soon to be improved by the introduction of the new Municipalities Act 1858, which localised government and gave the subsequent council the authority to allocate funds to improve community services and spaces. On 27 November 1861, the Municipality of Parramatta was proclaimed and by January 1862 Parramatta had its first mayor.

On 10 February 1868 Parramatta was visited by Prince Alfred, Australia's first Royal visitor, as part of a six-month tour of Australian colonies. Alfred was the second son of then Queen Victoria, and Duke of Edinburgh (he lived 1844-1900). On 31 August 1869 the "Old Gaol Green" was renamed "Alfred Square" to commemorate his visit.

In September 1869, the land known for many years as the "Gaol Green" was planted with trees by members of the "tree planting committee" comprising Councillors and local school children. The bunya pine (Araucaria bidwillii), pepper tree (Schinus areira), camphor laurels (Cinnamomum camphora) and Moreton Bay figs (Ficus macrophylla) seen today were probably planted at this time or soon after.

By 1871, the council also opened tenders for Alfred Square "for the purpose of depasturing stock" and "carting". The council even considered the area for the location of the greatly desired and much needed Parramatta Town Hall before the current site (the old market site in Church Street) was deemed more suitable.

In 1874, the Council was gazetted as Trustees of the reserve. Since its foundation at this time the square has been managed by Parramatta City Council.

Alfred Square was a vibrant community space that hosted a wide range of local events. In the 1880s, for example, events included open-air moonlight and afternoon concerts, a "great...go-as-you-please" 48-hour tournament in a "monster marquee" capable of holding 3,000 people and "brilliantly illuminated each evening," as well as a "Words of Grace Tent" where locals could attend evangelistic services. In late 1889, council discussed the construction of a bandstand in Alfred Square for the local band concerts that had become a regular occurrence. The beautification of the reserve, however, was not without its challenges. Freak storms led to the costly damage of railings and "trespassing cattle" tore and bruised the park's only oak tree. Young "Sunday Larrikins" and "hoodlums" were also known to be "violently opening the large gates...defacing the palisade fence," and throwing rocks at the trees, causing them - as well as innocent bystanders - serious injury. The fences were in a constant state of dilapidation but limited funds meant temporary repairs were favoured over replacements and when new fences were authorised, the contractor could not be compelled to finish the work in a timely manner.

In 1882 The Anderson Fountain was erected as a bequest from the late Dr Anderson. It was transferred from near the Town Hall to Alfred Square in 1888 when the larger Centennial Fountain was constructed. Its location was opposite Palmer Street. In 1922 it was relocated once again to its current position to make way for the War Memorial.

The riverbank side of the site was the location of Parramatta's first public baths, c. 1888 (where Riverside Theatres now stand).

The recognisable diagonal footpaths of today were first asphalted at the end of 1889.

In 1891 the bandstand was completed specifically in the shape of a late Victorian rotunda featuring decorative cast iron posts, brackets and valance capped with a copper roof.

=== Federation to 1950s ===
In c. 1900 Lennox Bridge and Church Street north was widened to accommodate the tram line to Castle Hill.

In the Federation era, particularly, the park began to adopt its current visage with the inclusion of an avenue of Canary Island palms (Phoenix canariensis), along the south-east/north-west diagonal pathway in 1918.

In 1922 the War Memorial Foundation stone was laid. It was unveiled by Lord Forster, Governor General of Australia. In 1923 the Parramatta Soldiers' Memorial was completed, with a stone obelisk and platform base, to commemorate World War I and, eventually, other subsequent conflicts.

In 1921 Parramatta City was allociated a 105mm field gun by the Commonwealth War Trophies Committee. This was placed in Prince Alfred Park some time later although not near the War Memorial. A single photograph from 1933 shows the gun in the north-western quarter of the park towards a large Moreton Bay fig tree and the Anderson fountain. The gun has since been relocated although its whereabouts are not known.

The second, south-west/north-east diagonal avenue was planted with brush box (Lophostemon confertus) and jacaranda (Jacaranda mimosifolia), along with other later tree plantings such as lemon scented gum (Corymbia citriodora), camphor laurel (Cinnamomum camphora), Yatay palms (Butia capitata) and firewheel trees (Stenocarpus sinuatus) being added c. 1930s-50s.

In April 1935, acommemorative Illawarra flame tree (Brachychiton acerifolius) was planted by the international founders of Rotary Club, Paul and Jean Harris, on the occasion of their visit to Parramatta.

In the 1930s a Bills horse trough was installed on the Victoria Road side of Prince Alfred Park. George and Annis Bills were animal welfare philanthropists. Upon the death of George Bills in 1927 a trust fund was set up to build and distribute horse troughs throughout NSW and Victoria to provide relief for working horses.

During World War II Prince Alfred Park was the site of community air raid shelters cut in a zig-zag pattern on the southern side of the south-east/north-west diagonal pathway.

In 1954 The Gollan Memorial Clock Tower was erected by the citizens of Parramatta in appreciation of the services of George Gollan, the Parramatta member of the Legislative Assembly 1932-1953.

In 1956 Parramatta Children's Library was constructed on southern side (facing Market St). It was re-purposed as an Information Bureau in the 1970s. The building was demolished in the 1990s.

The square has been known by many names - Village Green, Hanging Green, Gaol Green, Alfred Square. During the twentieth century the preferred name was Prince Alfred Park. 2014 the name of the park was officially changed through the Geographical Names Board of New South Wales to Prince Alfred Square.

For all its superficial changes, Prince Alfred Square has retained its fundamental function as a space where locals can enjoy festive events such as being the hub for Sydney Festival, Parramasala, and Winterlight, just as it was over one hundred years ago.

== Description ==
=== Setting ===
Prince Alfred Square is bounded to the east by Church Street, to the north by Victoria Road, to the west by Marist Place and to the south by Market Street. The parkland is relatively flat, sloping very gently from north to south. It is formed on Wianamatta Shale series geology which forms clayey soils of poor fertility. The original vegetation of the area would have consisted of open woodland composed of species such as forest red gum (Eucalyptus tereticornis) and grey gum (Eucalyptus moluccana). The square is connected to the town water supply.

Key elements that enhance the setting of the square are the former St. Peter's Congretational Church (1871) on Church/Palmer Streets to its east, St Patrick's Catholic Cathedral (1854-1936) and Our Lady of Mercy College (1889) on the northwest corner of Victoria Road and Marist Place, the Old King's School/Marsden Rehabilitation Centre (1836-1970s) and Murphy House (1904) on Marist Place to the south-west, and the Parramatta Riverside Theatres (1988) to the south on Market Street facing the river.

=== Layout ===
The layout consists of a square divided by two diagonal paths formed into avenues by trees. The current style of the square is predominantly Federation, however there are some Victorian period elements and later twentieth century elements present.

=== Designed elements ===
The two diagonal paths are paved with herringbone brick paving. The southeast-northwest path has a sandstone rusticated edging.

At the north-west corner of the square is the Anderson fountain, a granite drinking fountain, which was a bequest from Dr Anderson erected in 1882. It is square at the base, with large corner pedestals supporting short, vaguel Doric corner columns. Stumpy obelisk cap, topped with a large stone ball. Inscription on the west face, in a panel between the columns - "Anderson Fountain - a bequest from the late Dr Anderson to the inhabitants of Parramatta. Erected February 1882 Trustee James Pye Esq. Rocky Hall." Below the inscription is a drinking fountain set into a curved niche (no longer working).

East of the centre of the square, close to Church Street, is a band rotunda (1891), octagonal, cast iron columns, iron lace valence, capped with a facetted copper roof with a central turret pyramid raised above an encircling collar, and wooden soffit lining. This delicately modelled structure floats, seemingly weightless, on an octagonal concrete paved dais.

On the eastern side facing Church Street/opposite the Former St Peter's Church is the Parramatta War Memorial, a large trachyte obelisk, about 5m height, on a dais slightly elevated above surrounding gardens. Four steps lead up from the footpath to the dais and the obelisk with its inscriptions and bronze plaque. "Erected to perpetuate the spirit of those who served their country in the cause of freedom 1914-1919." The foundation stone was laid by Alderman L. A. Simpson, Mayor, on 25 November 1922. It was unveiled by Lord Forster, Governor General of Australia.

At the north-east corner of the square, terminating one of the diagonal paths, is a sandstone clock tower monument that was erected to commemorate the services to the district of George Gollan, MLA and former cabinet minister. The monument was completed in 1954 and stands in a circular sandstone paved setting and box hedging (Buxus koreana).

The only building in the park, an open bus shelter, is located on the southern boundary facing Market St. It is constructed of sandstone and appears to have been added in the 1960s.

=== Plantings ===
The earliest surviving plantings in the park are the 7 large Moreton Bay figs on the western and southern boundaries, a large camphor laurel near St. Patrick's church and the large bunya pine on the south-west corner near the Old King's School, that date from the Victorian period.

The south-west / north-east diagonal path is lined with brush box to the north and jacaranda to the south of the central path intersection. These plantings appear to date from the 1930s (a 1938 aerial photograph shows young 4-5m tall trees in this position). The south-east / north-west diagonal path is lined by an avenue of mature Canary Island date palms dating from the Federation period.

Symmetrical inter-war period plantings (1922) north and south of the War Memorial are two cotton palms (Washingtonia robusta), two jelly /Yatay palms, two lemon scented gums and two firewheel trees. (A 1938 aerial photograph shows young 2-3m tall trees in this position).

Possibly later (1930s–50s) twentieth century plantings are the numerous specimens of lemon-scented gum, Tasmanian blue gum (Eucalyptus globulus) and the Abelia hedge (Abelia floribunda) along the northern boundary.

A 1935 memorial planting of Illawarra flame tree on the eastern side of the park was made by the President Emeritus and founder of Rotary International, Paul P. Harris, of Chicago, along with Australian Rotary President R. P. Lukins and H. Ohlsen, Mayor.

Over 2005–06 further infill detail shrub plantings were made on both cross-axes – of azaleas (Rhododendron indicum), Hydrangea macrophylla, Camellia sasanqua, kaffir lilies (Clivia miniata) and liriope (Liriope muscari).

=== Features of the square ===
The square was once surrounded by sandstone wall, removed at some point. Vestiges of its stone base remain (south-west corner near Marist Place).

There is a stone horse trough near the corner of Church Street and Victoria Road which is listed on the State Heritage Inventory (2240585). George and Annis Bills were animal welfare philanthropists.

At the south-west corner of the square, marking the entry to one of the diagonal paths, are two circular sandstone gate posts that date from the Victorian period.

War Memorial

Is on the eastern edge of the square opposite Palmer Street on Church Street. It is a trachyte stone obelisk, 5m high, set on a dias slightly elevated above gardens of rosemary. Bronze plaque "Erected to Perpetuate the Spirit of those who served their Country in the Cause of Freedom 1914–1919". Foundation stone laid by Ald. Simpson, Mayor 25 November 1922.

Anderson Fountain

A granite monument, square at the base with large corner pedestals supporting short, vaguely Doric corner columns. A drinking fountain set into a curved niche. Inscribed "ANDERSON FOUNTAIN A bequest from the late Dr Anderson to the inhabitants of Parramatta Erected February 1882 Trustee James Pye Esq Rocky Hall."

Band Rotunda

East of the centre of the square, close to Church Street, is a band rotunda (1891), octagonal, cast iron columns, iron lace valence, capped with a facetted copper roof with a central turret pyramid raised above an encircling collar, and wooden soffit lining. This delicately modelled structure floats, seemingly weightless, on an octagonal concrete paved dais. Erected by Ald. Noller, a building contractor, for the Parramatta Borough Council in 1891. Renovated in 1996 and restored in 2016.

=== Perceptual elements ===
The collection of monuments and mature trees in the square and its setting dominated by 2 historic sandstone churches, the Old King's School complex, the Sisters of Mercy complex and modern Riverside Theatres complex provide a high quality urban precinct evocative of the various periods of the development of Parramatta.

The square provides a valuable open space resource to the many residents, workers and visitors of the Parramatta town centre district. The park functions as a "Village Green" and important civic space, forming an entry to the city from the north fronting the main street (Church Street), two major churches, a convent and the former King's School.

== Heritage listing ==
Prince Alfred Square is of state heritage significance as an intact representative example of a square or public park layout from the Victorian era, embellished in the Edwardian, inter-war and post-war eras. It is a rare example of the early Public Parks Movement in NSW. Significant for the age and maturity of its tree plantings. The oldest, including Moreton Bay figs, a camphor laurel and a bunya pine, date from the mid Victorian period (c. 1869–70s), and are reinforced by Federation-period plantings and later plantings (c. 1930s).

The site has historical values at a state level as it is the site of Parramatta's second gaol (1804–1841), first female factory (1804–1821), as a village green since 1837 and for associations with the Royal Visit of Prince Alfred in 1868. The site has exceptional archaeological research potential related to the above events.

Prince Alfred Square is the only civic park in Parramatta. It is significant for demonstrating the provision of public amenities & services – evidence of local Parramatta initiatives separate from Sydney. The site possesses potential to contribute to an understanding of early urban development and Government administration in Parramatta. The item is of state heritage significance for its association with notable people (Government Farm superintendent Henry Dodd, Governors Phillip, Hunter, King & Bourke, the Reverend Samuel Marsden, HRH Prince Alfred) and events (Castle Hill Rebellion).

The Square with its collection of monuments and mature trees are dominated by surrounding (State and Local heritage) sandstone churches and C19th schools which provide a high quality urban precinct evocative of the various periods of development of Parramatta.

Prince Alfred Square was listed on the New South Wales State Heritage Register on 28 August 2017 having satisfied the following criteria.

The place is important in demonstrating the course, or pattern, of cultural or natural history in New South Wales.

This item is of state heritage significance for its historical values and has the potential to contain archaeological remains from the early development of Parramatta since 1789 into the early 20th century. The site was part of the Government Farm (1789), used as the second Parramatta gaol (1802–1841) and first Female Factory and early textile factory/manufacture industry (1804–1821). It was the site of Parramatta hangings from 1804–c. 1829. Since 1837, the site has been authorised as a public reserve (one of the earliest in NSW) and remains a public park to this day, demonstrating the shift in land use on the north side of the river from a penal settlement to community and residential uses.

The site has the potential to provide evidence of a range of historical processes and activities relating to the history of Parramatta, including the development of Parramatta as a penal settlement, and its civic spaces.

The place has a strong or special association with a person, or group of persons, of importance of cultural or natural history of New South Wales's history.

Prince Alfred Square meets this criterion of state significance because of associations of the site with the male prisoners and convict women who occupied the site from 1804 to 1841, and with the numerous men who agitated for the construction of the gaol and the welfare of its inhabitants, including Governors King, Bligh and Macquarie, and the Rev. Samuel Marsden.

It is associated with the Castle Hill Rebellion as the site of four hangings – three of the nine rebellion ringleaders and one free settler. It is associated with Governor Bourke who decided the land should be measured for a reserve for the townsfolk. It is one of only two parks in NSW renamed and re-made for the first Royal visit to Australia by Prince Alfred, the Duke of Edinburgh, in 1868.

The place is important in demonstrating aesthetic characteristics and/or a high degree of creative or technical achievement in New South Wales.

This item is aesthetically significant at a state level as a formal urban open space, built on an early (1837) village green, from later memorial plantings in 1869/70s, Federation and interwar periods. The square is rare intact, early example of the Public Parks Movement in NSW.

The collection of monuments and mature trees and its setting dominated by (State and Local heritage) sandstone churches and C19th schools provides a high quality urban precinct evocative of the various periods of development of Parramatta.This item is aesthetically significant at a state level as a formal urban open space, built on an early (1837) village green, from later memorial plantings in 1869/70s, Federation and interwar periods. The square is rare intact, early example of the Public Parks Movement in NSW.

The place has strong or special association with a particular community or cultural group in New South Wales for social, cultural or spiritual reasons.

Prince Alfred Square is of importance for the local community's sense of place, however, it has the potential social value for the people of Sydney/Western Sydney given its role and use for events and commemorations.

The place has potential to yield information that will contribute to an understanding of the cultural or natural history of New South Wales.

The archaeological resources this site will most likely present evidence of past human culture and activity, and therefore have potential to yield scientific and historical information. Prince Alfred Square and potential archaeological site is likely to comprise relics of state significance, demonstrating the nature of life within the second Parramatta gaol (1804–1841) and first Female Factory (1804–1821).

The place possesses uncommon, rare or endangered aspects of the cultural or natural history of New South Wales.

Prince Alfred Square and potential archaeological site meets this criterion of state significance because the civic park is rare for its age, and for its representative formal layout and plantings, of the Victorian, Federation and interwar eras.

Any archaeological remains would be scarce physical evidence relating to the early history of Parramatta with archaeology associated with the gaol and factory complexes (1802–1841) which would be considered a very rare example of an early penal institution in NSW and Australia.

The place is important in demonstrating the principal characteristics of a class of cultural or natural places/environments in New South Wales.

Potential archaeological resources from this site is of state significance and would provide a physical chronicle of the history of Parramatta. Any archaeology associated with the gaol and factory complexes (1802–1841) would be considered representative of the convict experience within early correctional institutions, albeit part of a rare group of structures.

Prince Alfred Square is a representative (and as relatively intact, also rare) surviving example of the Public Parks Movement in NSW, of the first major "wave" of public park "making" by elected municipal or city councils in NSW.
