= Slop (clothing) =

Cheap ready-made clothing

In 16th- to 19th-century Europe and North America, the slop trade was the manufacture and sale of slop, cheap ready-made clothing.

Slop was made by slop-workers and sold in slop-shops by slop-sellers. An anonymous tract Slop-Shops and Slop Workers described working conditions in the industry. By around 1850 the production of slop garments was being identified with the sweating system, a neologism of that period.

== Slop as clothing ==
"Slop" from Middle English could mean various types of loose clothing. The Oxford English Dictionary records a meaning for costume that is "Ready-made clothing and other furnishings supplied to seamen from the ship's stores; hence, ready-made, cheap, or inferior garments generally."

The name "slop" was in older use naval slang for the cheap ready-made clothing that a naval rating would purchase in lieu of an official uniform (which ratings in the British Royal Navy, at least, did not have until 1857) sometimes from a "slop chest" maintained on board ship by the purser. In 1812 Samuel Hambleton received a detailed letter from Alexander Hamilton about requisitioning slop clothing in New York.

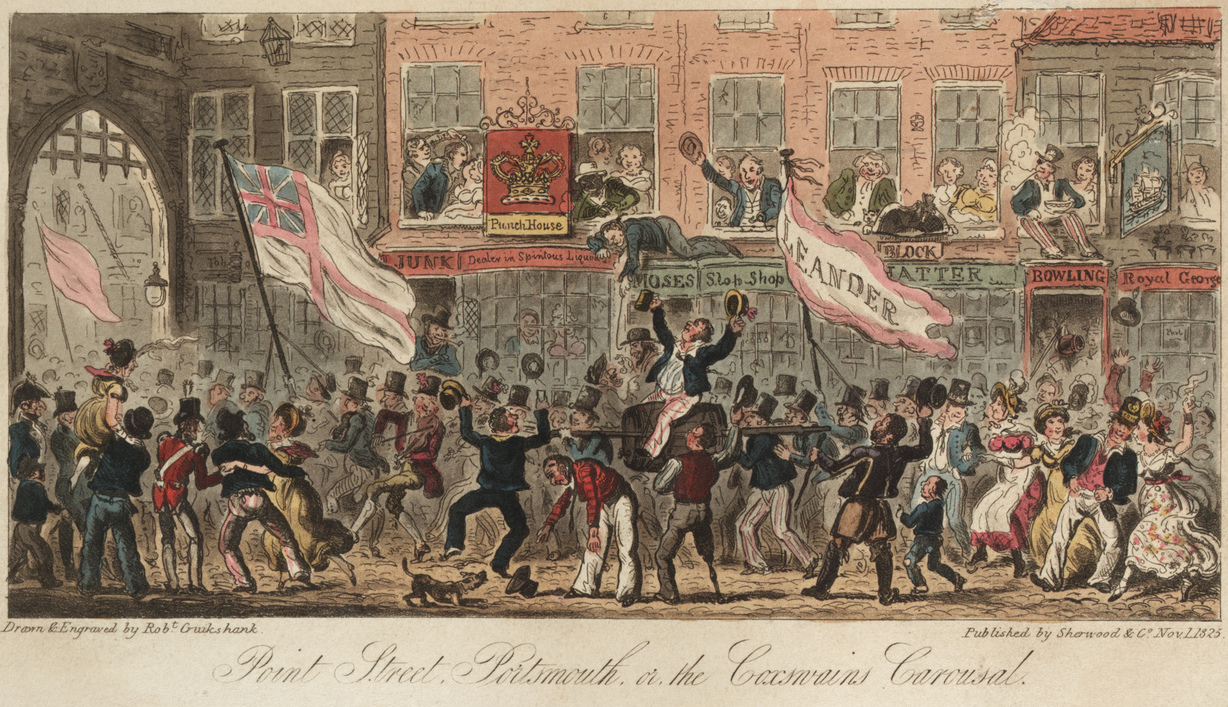
Point Steer, Portsmouth, or, the Coxwain Carousal, 1825 caricature, with in the background a slop shop

== The trade ==
The trade in slop clothing originated in government purchases of uniforms for soldiers and sailors; said uniforms being standardized and mass-produced rather than tailored to individuals, made to official specifications with rules about materials and shapes. Growth in the trade was particularly spurred on by wartime orders for military clothing, such as during the Nine Years War and the War of the Spanish Succession.

Slop-sellers by the 18th century sold to the general public as well as to the army and navy, and received a boost from the Napoleonic Wars. Slop work became organized into a system of large clothing warehouses subcontracting out to small workshops or individuals. The pejorative "slop trade" is given by Partridge as a slang term used by tailors, for work of "no class", from the mid-19th century.

== 19th-century developments ==
In the 19th century, "slop" had a negative connotation. There was an economic conflict between the slop traders and the older bespoke tailoring industry. At the same time the retail trade in cheap clothing underwent transformative change, as evidenced by the commercial career of Elias Moses (1783–1868). He began as a dealer in second-hand clothes, at a time when such dealers became textile merchants. Fabric prices fell in the 1820s and 1830s. He opened a shop for ready-made clothes in London's Aldgate, which by the 1850s was the largest shop in London.

By semantic change, "slop", which had once related to the procurement of naval clothing, was applied generally to ready-made garments. By a further semantic change during the 19th century, "slop" became a term applied to all clothing that was not skillfully tailor-made for the customer: so might refer to machine-cut and machine-stitched garments, those made by apprentices or those less skilled, and those sold second-hand. The connotation of low quality carried over to boots, and furniture.

Henry Mayhew gave an analysis of the evolution of the slop-trade in ready-made clothes from the older second-hand clothes business. The latter, in London, had for a time in the 19th century been dominated by Jewish traders. When at mid-century they faced competition, particularly from Irish immigrants, "they evolved the wholesale bespoke tailoring and slop-trade of the City and East-end sweatshops".

=== Industrial-scale clothes production ===
In the United Kingdom the rise of industrialization led to a growing workforce of largely female slop-worker labour, working on piecework, paid by the item, from home, which grew to outnumber the largely male workforce of craft tailors who in contrast worked in a master tailor's workshop and were paid by time worked.

In 1824 the ratio of the former to the latter in London was 4:1, but by 1849 it was 3:20. The gender disparity had been created by exclusionary practices in the craft tailoring trade in the late 18th and early 19th century, as male tailors sought to exclude women. The women slop-workers were seen as, and sometimes used as, strike-breakers, particularly in the London Tailors' Union strike of 1834 (which sought better wages, shorter hours, and a prohibition of the piecework and homework that slop-work involved). A succession of strikes organized by tailors' unions (in 1827, 1830, and 1834) largely failed.

Similar factors were at work elsewhere; such as in Baltimore in the United States, where large tailoring enterprises such as Thomas Sheppard and Nathaniel Childs took to styling themselves "tailor and slop seller". An increasingly female population with a growing number of female household heads provided a ready workforce of cheaper lesser-skilled female labour.

=== Materials ===
Some slops were made of shoddy. Parramatta cloth was one type of slop cloth made of wool, and there were flax linen cloths for convict clothing that women convicts in Australia made at the Parramatta Female Factory.

Towards the end of the century, sociologist Beatrice Potter compared the work involved in a morning coat made by a Savile Row tailor, such as Poole & Son, with one made for the slop trade. She stated that the difference did not lie in the materials used, but in the quality of the work, "bagged up" with machine sewing, and the fit.

=== Marketing and reputation ===
In London, cheap ready-made clothing gained a wider market through increased middle-class and working-class incomes in the latter part of the century. Exploitation of mainly low-skilled women workers in the industry included those whose jobs were small steps in the overall process of the production of the clothes. Concern about the conditions found expression in The Song of the Shirt (1843) by Thomas Hood. In 1852 Thomas Hughes published A Lecture on the Slop-System, concentrating on the effect on female employment.

The contemporary commentator Henry Mayhew interviewed clothes sellers. His investigations concluded that by 1844, almost 75% of London's tailors were concentrated in the East End, engaged in what amounted to slop work. Charles Kingsley, in both his Cheap Clothes and Nasty and Alton Locke, Tailor and Poet, painted the traditional tailoring trade's view of the situation as the "honourable" traditional tradesmen (also known as "Flints") versus the "dishonourable" slop-workers (named "Dungs") who worked in sweat-shops, and the de-skilling of what was once skilled labour. Mayhew's figures were that the "honourable" masters were diminished by 150 per year.

== Sources ==
- Toplis, Alison (2015). The Clothing Trade in Provincial England, 1800–1850. Perspectives in Economic and Social History. Routledge. ISBN 9781317323051.
- Honeyman, Katrina (2000). Well Suited: A History of the Leeds Clothing Industry, 1850–1990. Pasold studies in textile history. Vol. 11. Pasold Research Fund. ISBN 9780199202379.
- Burnette, Joyce (2008). Gender, Work and Wages in Industrial Revolution Britain (PDF). Cambridge Studies in Economic History. Cambridge University Press. ISBN 9781139470582.
- Alden, John Berry (1892). Alden's Manifold Cyclopedia of Knowledge and Language. Vol. 34. New York: The Columbia Publishing Company.
- Steffen, Charles G. (1984). The Mechanics of Baltimore: Workers and Politics in the Age of Revolution, 1763–1812. Working class in American history. University of Illinois Press. ISBN 9780252010880.
- Green, David R. (1995). From Artisans to Paupers: Economic Change and Poverty in London, 1790–1870. Scolar Press. ISBN 9781859280331.
- "London Labour and the London Poor by Henry Mayhew". The North British Review. Vol. 14. Edinburgh: W. P. Kennedy. 1851.
