= Ann Gordon =

Ann Gordon (or variants) may refer to:

- Ann D. Gordon, American history research professor
- Ann Gordon (superintendent), British-born Australian factory superintendent
- Anne Gordon, Countess of Moray, Scottish aristocrat
- Anne Gordon (born 1941), Australian cricketer
- Annerley Gordon (born 1967), also known as Ann Lee (singer), a British electropop/Eurodance singer
- Anna Adams Gordon (1853–1931), American temperance movement leader
- Ann McCrory (Ann Gordon McCrory, born 1956), first lady of North Carolina

== See also ==
- Gordon (surname)
