= Parramatta Hospital Archaeological Site =

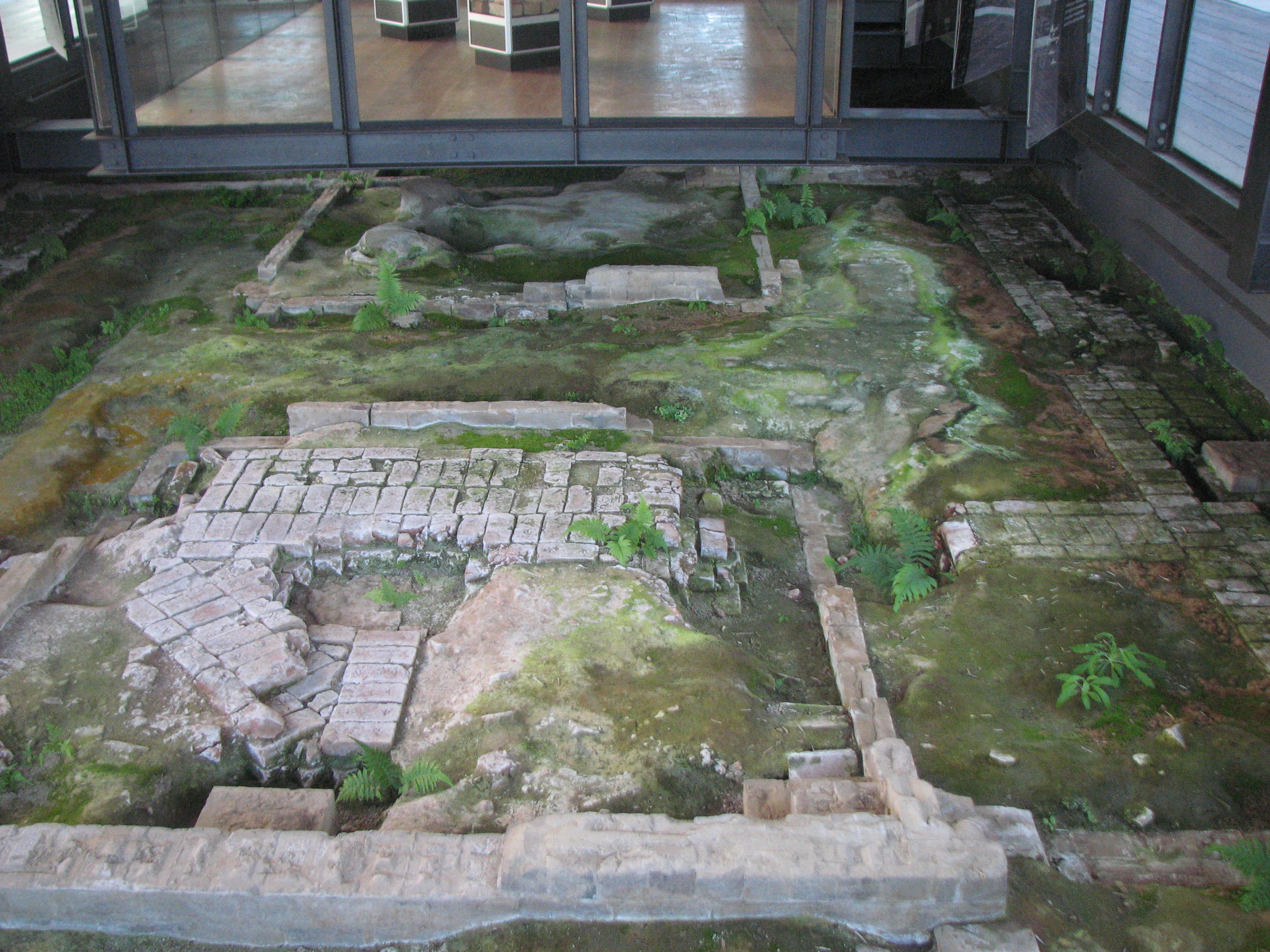
- A section of the Parramatta Hospital Archaeological Site

- Location within Sydney Location within Australia
- 33°48′44″S 151°00′08″E
- Location: Marsden Street, Parramatta, City of Parramatta, New South Wales, Australia

History
- Built: 1818–

New South Wales Heritage Register
- Official name: Parramatta District Hospital - Archaeology; Archaeological Site potential - Parramatta District Hospital ; Parramatta Justice Precinct
- Type: state heritage (archaeological-terrestrial)
- Designated: 2 April 1999
- Reference no.: 828
- Type: Hospital
- Category: Health Services

Parramatta Hospital Archaeological Site is a heritage-listed archaeological site at Marsden Street, Parramatta, City of Parramatta, New South Wales, Australia. It was added to the New South Wales State Heritage Register on 2 April 1999.

== History ==
The site includes remains of the second convict hospital (1792–1818) and John Watts' third convict hospital (1818–1844), as well as other remains such as a convict hut, surgeon's residence and associated artefacts.

It was excavated in the 2000s as part of the Parramatta Justice Precinct development. The archaeological remains were incorporated into a new courtyard as part of the new development. Two pavilions were established to house exhibits and interpretation panels, and other aspects of the site were capped with a protective slab. The project won an Architects Australia Award for heritage work in 2008.

== Heritage listing ==
The Parramatta Hospital Archaeological Site was listed on the New South Wales State Heritage Register on 2 April 1999. It is of historical and archaeological significance as a record of convict settlement of the site dating back to 1790. This site is one of the first settled urban sites in Australia.

== See also ==
- Parramatta Archaeological Site
- Parramatta Justice Precinct
