= Parramatta Gaol =

Parramatta Correctional Centre
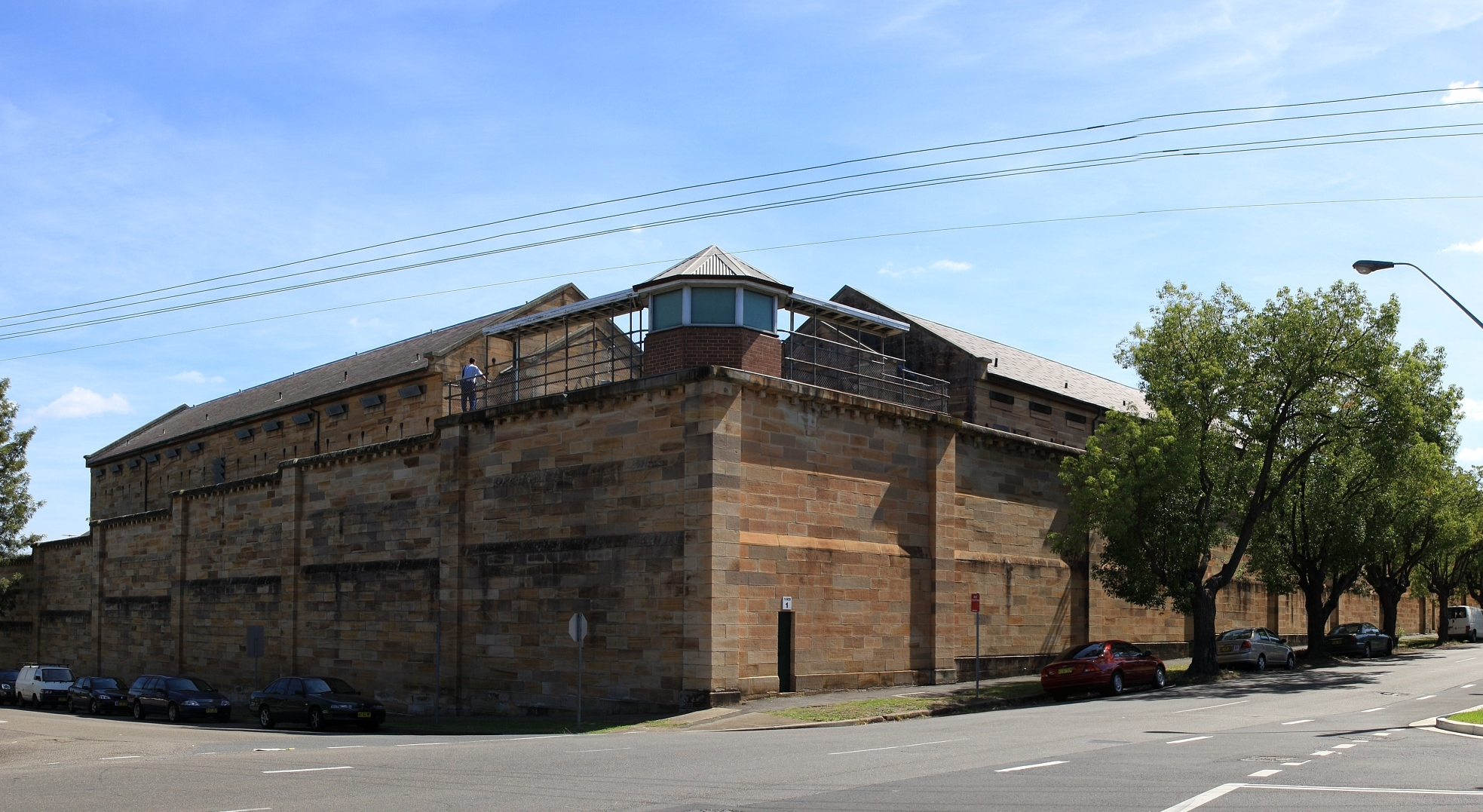
- Interactive map of Parramatta Correctional Centre
- Location: North Parramatta, New South Wales, Australia; 33°47′57″S 151°00′00″E
- Status: Closed
- Security class: Medium security (males only)
- Capacity: 580
- Opened: 1 January 1798 (in Parramatta)
- Closed: 9 October 2011
- Former name: Parramatta Gaol
- Managed by: Deerubbin Local Aboriginal Land Council
- Building details
- Location within Sydney

General information
- Opened: 2 January 1842 (current site)
- Owner: Deerubbin Local Aboriginal Land Council

Technical details
- Material: Sandstone, stone slab floors, ashlar walls and timber roof trusses
- Grounds: 8.743 hectares (21.60 acres)

Design and construction
- Architects: George Barney and Mortimer Lewis
- Architecture firm: Colonial Architect of New South Wales

Register of the National Estate
- Official name: Parramatta Gaol (former), 73 O'Connell St, North Parramatta, NSW, Australia
- Designated: 14 May 1991
- Reference no.: 3090

New South Wales Heritage Register
- Criteria: a., c., e.
- Designated: 2 April 1999
- Reference no.: 00812

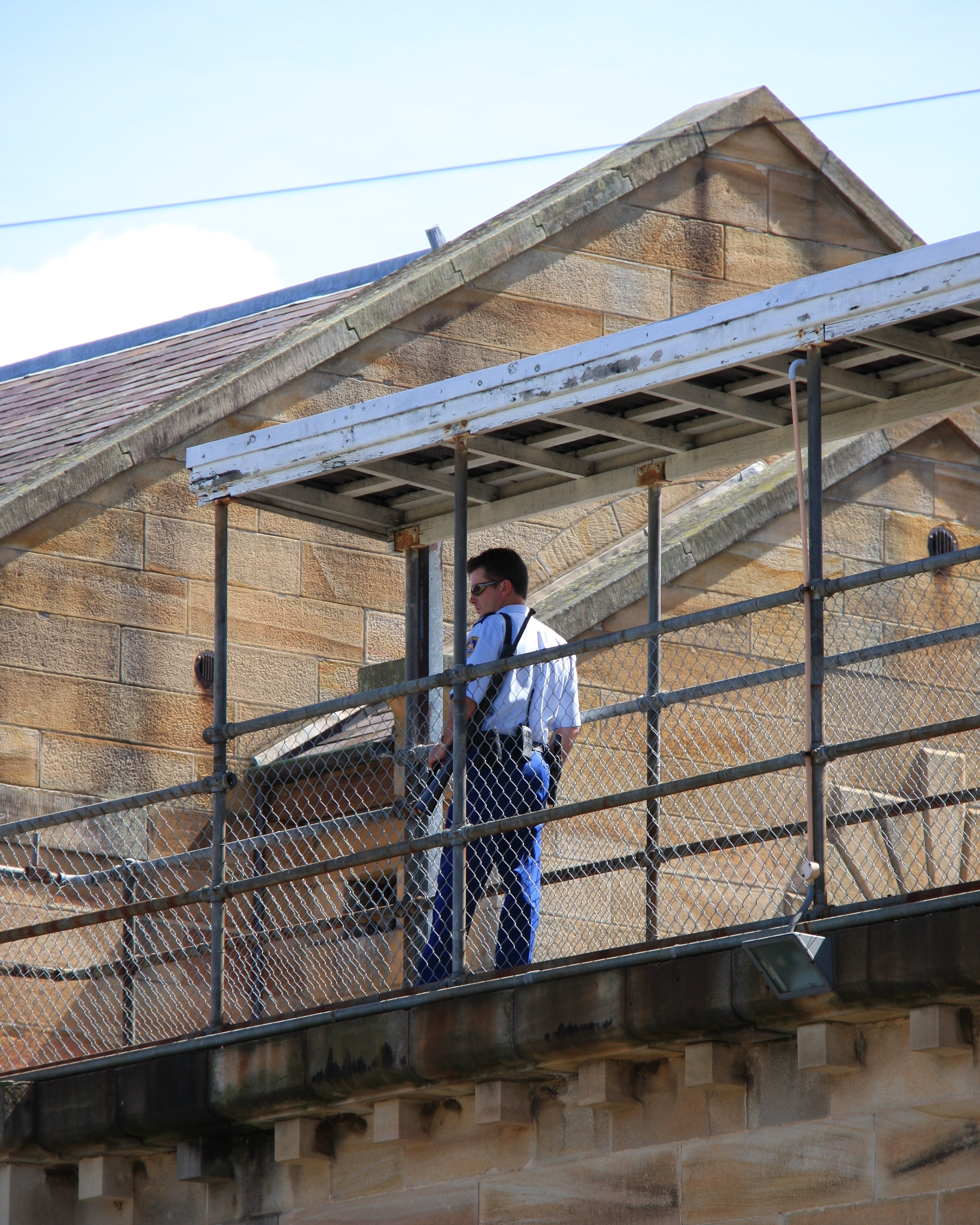
A prison guard on lookout in the watchtower at Parramatta Gaol

The Parramatta Correctional Centre is a heritage-listed former medium security prison for males on the corner of O'Connell and Dunlop Streets, North Parramatta, Sydney, New South Wales, Australia. It was in operation between 1798 and 2011. The centre was initially called Parramatta Gaol until its name was changed to Parramatta Correctional Centre in 1992. When in operation, the centre was managed by Corrective Services NSW, an agency of the Department of Communities and Justice of the Government of New South Wales. Immediately prior to its closure, the centre detained short term sentenced and remand inmates, operated as a transient centre, and was the periodic detention centre for metropolitan Sydney.

Designed by George Barney and Mortimer Lewis, the complex is listed on the Register of the National Estate and the New South Wales State Heritage Register as a site of State significance.

== History ==
Correctional facilities were first established in Parramatta in 1798, being "a strong logged gaol of 100 feet in length, with separate cells for the prisoners ... and paled around with very high fence", housing eight prisoners. In 1799, a fire destroyed this facility and it was rebuilt in 1802 on the same site (now occupied by Riverside Theatres).

The current Parramatta Correctional Centre was the third gaol to be built in Parramatta and was completed in 1842. The original design was submitted by Mortimer Lewis for Governor Bourke in 1835, however the buildings were commenced to a design by Captain George Barney, the Commanding Royal Engineer. When the first building was completed in 1842 by (James) Houison and Payten, Thomas Duke Allen was installed as the gaoler, with his wife Martha acting as matron for the female prisoners.

Between 1842 and 1861, a number of improvements were made to conditions within the prison, but major extensions were not undertaken until 1862. As a result of the population boom caused by the gold rushes, both Victoria and New South Wales were forced to expand their penal facilities between 1858 and 1865. During this time, the perimeter wall of the original gaol was extended to enclose a portion of land equal in size to the existing allotment. In August 1863 as the wall was nearing completion, William Coles, the first clerk of works for the Colonial Architect, initiated a substantial works programme in both the original and new areas of the gaol. This included demolition of the portion of wall separating the new and old sections of the gaol and the construction of various workshops, a cookhouse and extra cells in existing wings, as well as the installation of new utilities including underground water tanks.

Three further extensions of the gaol perimeter wall were carried out during the last quarter of the nineteenth century. Within the new enclosure, three cell wings were slowly built between 1883 and 1889, largely with prison labour. Owing to overcrowding of the observation ward at Darlinghurst Gaol part of one of these wings was set aside for prisoners who had been deemed insane. In 1899, a 32 unit radial exercise yard was constructed in the space formed on three sides by the recently constructed wings. At this time the cells were also converted from associated cells to single cells, under the influence of comptroller general, William Frederick Neitenstein.

The period from the end of the nineteenth century to WWI was devoted to the improvement of auxiliary facilities – industrial, spiritual and hygienic. In 1906 – 1908, a chapel was constructed within the prison walls while sewerage and ablutions blocks were upgraded.

Due to declining entries into the penal system, the gaol was disestablished on 15 September 1918 and the property given over to the inspector of mental hospitals. At this time the western sandstone perimeter walls were demolished and much of the equipment and internal fittings removed. By 1927 however, with an increase in demand on the system, the gaol was rehabilitated and was re-established in 1927. Notably, this rehabilitation involved the conversion of the single cells back to associated cells. Parramatta became a centre for re-training and rehabilitation.

The 1940s began a period of official mistreatment of nineteenth century institutional establishments and a number of unsympathetic buildings were approved for construction. In the 1970s, the Parramatta Linen Service, a large auditorium and an extension to the gatehouse were built. This period also saw the opening of periodic detention centres for males and females.

A new development scheme completed in 1993 included a pedestrian and large vehicle entry off Dunlop Street and new adjacent buildings for reception, administration and visiting facilities. These new designs attempted to match the form and scale of the original precinct, with hipped roofs and bricks which complemented the sandstone.

The centre closed briefly between 3 September 1997 and 1998.

In 2004, there were calls for the centre to be closed after two inmates escaped by scaling the prison wall using ladders without being seen by guards.

In July 2011, Corrective Services NSW announced that the Parramatta Correctional Centre would close, which took effect on 9 October 2011. State Property Management Authority administered the site until 2015, and has now been returned to the Deerubin Local Aboriginal Lands Council as part of a historic lands grant.

=== Timeline ===
- 1865 – Perimeter wall extended. Cookhouse and additional cells added to existing wings. Underground water tanks installed.
- 1883–1889 – The perimeter is further extended and three new wings are built in the resulting area.
- 1899 – 32 unit radial exercise area built. Cells are converted from associated to single.
- 1906–1908 – Chapel built and sewerage upgraded.
- 1927 – Internal refit. Single cells are converted back to associated cells.
- 1970s – Parramatta Linen Service, an auditorium and gatehouse extensions are built.
- 1985 – 32 unit radial exercise area demolished.
- 1993 – A new entrance and areas for administration and reception are built.
- 1997 – being disestablished.
- 2011 – The jail was closed at the end of 2011.

== Current use ==
During 2012 the centre was used for the setting of a film, The Convict, and has been used in filming for Home and Away, Underbelly, Packed to the Rafters, Rake, Redfern Now, Housos and Mr Inbetween television series.

On 24 February 2012 the NSW Aboriginal Land Council lodged a land claim on the former jail site (as decommissioned Crown Land); and it was reported that management of the property was transferred to the Deerubbin Local Aboriginal Land Council in 2015.

The Gaol also runs "Ghost Hunts" and tours fortnightly.

== Description ==
Parramatta Gaol is a tooled sandstone structure of several wings, enclosed by high sandstone walls topped with observation towers. Designed in Old Grecian style, it consists of six cell blocks, three storeys in height. To the rear are three radiating semi-circular or rectangular two storey prison blocks. A number of cells have been enlarged to house two prisoners. Uniformity of materials used during times of addition contribute to the cohesion of this group of sandstone buildings. Talls are generally hand dressed, with slate clad timber roof structure.

It was reported to be in good condition as at 28 July 1997. Much of the original precinct remains intact although many of the internal fittings have been removed.

== Heritage listing ==
Parramatta Correctional Centre was listed on the New South Wales State Heritage Register on 2 April 1999 having satisfied the following criteria.

The place is important in demonstrating the course, or pattern, of cultural or natural history in New South Wales.

Up until its closure in 2011, the Parramatta Correctional Centre was the oldest gaol in original use in Australia. It is the most intact of the pre-1850s gaols of Australia. It has strong, documented, century and a half associations with people who have shaped its fabric and regimes and with those who have been shaped by it. The complex is also of value to Parramatta as an element in a group of early institutions linked by a parkland setting along the left bank of the Parramatta River, including the Cumberland Hospital (former Female Factory 1822) and the Norma Parker Centre. (former Roman Catholic Orphan School of 1841–43).

The place is important in demonstrating aesthetic characteristics and/or a high degree of creative or technical achievement in New South Wales.

The constructional character and quality of the early buildings, in particular the stone slab floors, ashlar walls and timber roof trusses, are exceptional. It is significant in its physical and spatial quality as an enclosed complex: in particular the character established by its coherent architectural form and predominant sandstone and slate materials.

The place has potential to yield information that will contribute to an understanding of the cultural or natural history of New South Wales.

The fabric reflects the shifts in penal philosophy and changes in use from the 1830s to the construction of Long Bay in the early twentieth century. The fabric is an educational and archaeological resource, as a continuing document of Australian social history and a potential source of information about the cultural past of the colony since 1788.

== In popular culture ==
The song "Tomorrow", recorded by Australian rock band Cold Chisel on their 1980 album East, apparently portrays the desperation of a Parramatta Gaol inmate on a life sentence who, having escaped three days earlier, faces imminent recapture.

The Parramatta Correctional Centre has been the filming location of various Australian productions, including Wake in Fright, Home and Away, Rake, Redfern Now, Packed to the Rafters and Underbelly.

== Notable prisoners ==
The following individuals have served all or part of their sentence at the Parramatta Correctional Centre:

Inmate name	Date sentenced	Length of sentence	Incarceration status	Nature of conviction / Notoriety	Notes
Darcy Dugan		Life imprisonment	Released on parole in 1984. Died 1991.	Bank robbery and a notorious prison escape artist.	
William Henry Eyes	July 1884	3 years	Pardoned in 1885. Deceased 1907.	English-born Australian convicted for the sexual assault of a young girl; later a successful politician in New Zealand.	
George Freeman	1954		Deceased 1990	Convicted of theft. An organised crime figure and illegal casino operator.	
John 'Chow' Hayes	several	15 years to begin	Deceased 1993	Underworld figure, standover man and convicted murderer.	
Len Lawson		Life imprisonment	Died in custody in 2003	Rapist and murderer.	
Jim McNeil		17 years	Released on parole in c. 1974. Died 1982.	Playwright, armed robbery	
Neddy Smith		Life imprisonment	Died in custody at Long Bay Gaol in 2021	Armed robbery, murderer and heroin dealer, accused of being a hitman, served life.	
Tim Anderson	1979	16 years	Exonerated and released in 1985.	Anderson's 1979 conviction of conspiracy to commit murder was overturned in 1985. His original conviction is cited as a miscarriage of justice.	

One of the killers of Dr Victor Chang, Choon Tee Philip Lim, a Malaysian citizen, was in Parramatta jail. He was released into the custody of waiting immigration officials and was deported to Malaysia soon after this.

== See also ==
- Punishment in Australia
- Parramatta Female Factory
