= Elizabeth Raine =

Elizabeth Raine (died 1842) was an Australian educator and official. She was the manager of the Parramatta Female Factory in 1823-38, and one of the first schools for girls in Sydney between 1831 and 1842.

Raine arrived in Australia from England as Elizabeth Fulloon with her children John, Charles, Eliza, Maria and Matilda in 1823. She and her spouse John Fulloon had been employed as joint superintendents of the Parramatta Female Factory, which had been founded in 1821 to house and employ female convicts not employed elsewhere. Her spouse died during the trip to Australia, but Elizabeth Fulloon became the first superintendent or "matron" of the Paramatta Female Factory, and was recommended for her efficiency. The governor called her "a woman of extraordinary bodily strength and energy of character", and she was reportedly able to manage the factory with such discipline that it was unnecessary with punishments. She married Robert Raines (d. 1828) in 1826, and thus became known as Elizabeth Raine. She later married a William Speed.

In 1828, her daughter Matilda Fulloon (from 1832 Matilda Ormiston) had opened her own school for girls in Sydney, and in 1831, Elizabeth Raine became her partner and took over the post of manager of the school; they were also joined by her other daughter Eliza Fulloon (from 1836 Eliza Garnsey). The school belonged to the first schools for girls in the colony. The first known schools for girls in Australia was the school of a "Mrs Williams" in Sydney in 1806, of which not much more than the advertisement is known, but the school of Elizabeth Raine and her daughters were a stable and long lasting institution. It took a high fee and was successful, having 18 enlisted students in 1838, which was more than any of their competitors, such as the school of Mary Ann Fisk (1829–31) and the school of Anne de Metz and her daughters (1834-fl. 1868). The school offered basic education in The three Rs with geography, English grammar and needlework. At this time, schools for girls seldom offered much more than that, but it differed from the high class girl's schools in Europe, which normally offered education in music, French and art to be defined as a higher school for girls: such a school was not founded in Sydney until that of Elizabeth Allison (from 1842 Marr, from 1844 Wilkinsson) in 1839.

Raine kept her position as manager of the school until her death in 1842.
