= Parramatta Female Factory =

Former female factory in Sydney, Australia

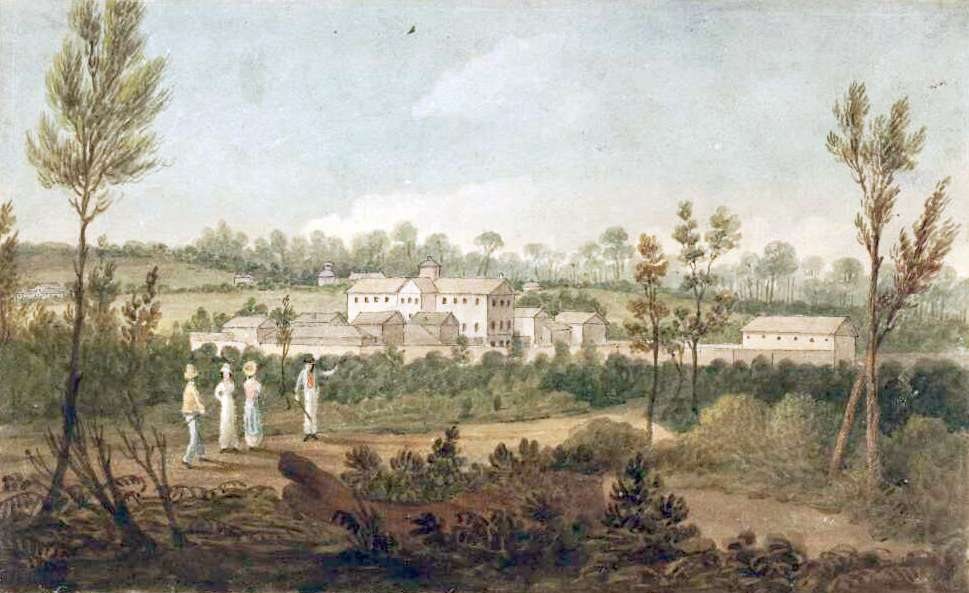
- Female penitentiary or factory, Parramatta, watercolour; 15.9 x 25.7 cm.
- Interactive map of Parramatta Female Factory
- Location: 5 Fleet Street, North Parramatta, New South Wales, Australia; 33.8009°S 151.0°E
- Status: Register of the National Estate
- Security class: Former female factory
- Capacity: 7,500
- Opened: 1821
- Closed: 1848
- Managed by: NSW Planning, Infrastructure and Environment
- Website: https://www.parramattafemalefactoryfriends.com.au

The Parramatta Female Factory is a National Heritage Listed place and has three original sandstone buildings and the sandstone gaol walls. The Parramatta Female Factory was designed by convict architect Francis Greenway in 1818 and the only female building authorized by Governor Lachlan Macquarie. It comprises the 1821 Matron's Quarters and Administration and Stores Building, the 1821 Female Hospital and the 1826 3rd Class Female Penitentiary. It is the first female factory in the penal colony of New South Wales, and is located at 5 Fleet Street, North Parramatta, New South Wales, Australia. It was one of 13 female factories in the colonies of New South Wales and Van Diemen's Land. In New South Wales, female factories were also established in Bathurst, Newcastle, Port Macquarie and Moreton Bay (2 factories). The factory idea was a combination of the functions of the British bridewells, prisons and workhouses. The Parramatta Female Factory is being considered for World Heritage listing.

== History ==
The first female factory was above the Parramatta Gaol, in what is now Prince Alfred Square (formerly known as Gaol Green and Hanging Green). This two storey building was commissioned by Governor King and the convict women moved in 1804. Within a decade there was considerable pressure on the authorities to deal with increasing numbers of female convicts who could not be adequately accommodated at the factory. There were over 200 women and children in a place that could only house 30 at night.

The factory was the destination for many of the convict women sent as prisoners to the colony of NSW. Over 9,000 names have been recorded as passing through the factories, of which an estimated 5,000 went through Parramatta.

With the arrival of Governor Lachlan Macquarie a solution was acted on. Macquarie selected a 4-acre (16,000 m^{2}) portion of William Bligh's 105 acre grant further upstream on the Parramatta River to build a new factory and issued instructions to convict architect Francis Greenway to design a building that would accommodate 250 women. This was the first purpose-built female factory in the Colony and a model for the others.

The first stone was laid by Governor Macquarie in 1818 and the women were transferred from the old factory in 1821. The factory was built using convict labour from locally quarried sandstone and was completed in 1821 at the cost of £4,778. The walls of the main building ranged from 2 feet 6 inches (0.76 m) at the foundation to 20 inches (510 mm) at the apex of its three storeys. It had an oak shingled roof, floors of 6 inches (150 mm) paving or stringbark with barred leadlight windows in the basement and lead glazed windows on the upper floors. The first floor was used for meals with the top two floors for sleeping and other activities. The porter, deputy superintendent, superintendent and matron were provided with separate accommodation on the site.

The Parramatta Female Factory was multi-purpose. It was a place of assignment, a hospital, a marriage bureau, a factory, an asylum and a prison for those who committed a crime in the Colony. The reason it is called a factory is because it manufactured cloth - linen, wool and linsey woolsey. It was also the site of the colony's first manufactured export producing 60,000 yards (55,000 m) of woven cloth in 1822.The women also did spinning, knitting, straw plaiting, washing, cleaning duties and if in third class, rock breaking and oakum picking.

In October 1827, the factory was the site of women rioting as a response to a cut in rations and their poor conditions. The matron, Mrs Raine, had resigned and she had to be rescued. Ann Gordon began her work as the factory's new matron and superintendent with her first task being to negotiate with the women who had escaped from the building. She was able to persuade them to return, but the disputed ration of bread and sugar remained. In less than an hour over 100 women escaped en masse and proceeded into the town where 40 soldiers and the threat of guns brought them back. They returned with a plunder of foodstuffs and when the ringleaders were confined, they released them. This was the first of the riots. Other riots at the factory occurred in 1831,1833, 1836 and 1843.

Gordon had been appointed by the Governor, Ralph Darling. He had complained previously that there was no one available to take the role but he had offered the position to Gordon at £150 per annum (£50 less per year than her predecessor). Ann, her husband Robert, and their children, were given quarters. Darling was supportive of Gordon as she endeavoured to introduce smooth management into the factory. She had several assistant matrons and four other staff including a constable who was the gatekeeper but they were not always co-operative. By 1835 she had added to the staff various trusted women convicts who served as midwife and overseers.

However, discipline deteriorated and there were rumours of improprieties. In 1836 Gordon was dismissed, although the governor Richard Bourke said there was no wrongdoing, and she received a year's salary in compensation. Bourke told his superiors he had introduced order and had put the factory on a prison footing. Gordon was replaced by Sarah and Thomas Bell who were the matron and the keeper.

By 1842 the factory accommodated 1,203 women as well as children. With the end of convict transportation to the colony, in 1848 the site was reassigned as a Convict Lunatic and Invalid Asylum.

== Current use ==
The Parramatta Female Factory is now the earliest surviving female factory in Australia. The site is listed on the New South Wales State Heritage Register and is inscribed on the Australian National Heritage List on 17 November 2017.

== In popular culture ==
- In 1937, Parramatta Female Factory was the subject of the film To New Shores directed by Douglas Sirk and starring Zarah Leander.
- Joy Storey wrote a musical about the female factory in the 1960s.
- Nick Enright wrote a play called the Female Factory in the 1980s.
- In 1981, Australian folk group Redgum released a track, "Parramatta Gaol 1843", with lyrics alluding to an escape attempt from the Parramatta Female Factory.
- In 2008 it was the subject of a play, a cartoon, an exhibition that travelled around Australia - Women Transported - Life in Australia's Convict Female Factories.
- In 2017, Tom Kenneally and Meg Kenneally published a crime fiction novel, The Unmourned, set in the Parramatta Female Factory.

== See also ==
- Cascades Female Factory
- Parramatta Archaeological Site
- Parramatta Correctional Centre
- Parramatta cloth
- Ross Female Factory

== Archival holdings ==
- NRS 12228 - Principal Superintendent of Convicts: Parramatta Female Factory, Record of females discharged, Oct 1846-Apr 1848 [6/5347 part], Reel 2802. Held New South Wales State Archives and Records.
- NRS 12229 - Female Factory, Parramatta: Medical case book, 1846-Mar 1848 [6/5350 part]. Held New South Wales State Archives and Records.
