= Parramatta cloth =

Tweed cloth of the early 1800s from Parramatta, Australia

Parramatta cloth was a cloth of the early 19th century from the town Parramatta in Australia. Initially, it was a coarse cloth produced by the inmates of Parramatta Female Factory, and used for convicts’ clothing. After 1815 the cloth was finished in a separate factory, producing a tweed of superior quality which was imitated by English producers.

== Slop cloth ==
Parramatta Female Factory was a prison for female transportees, and females who had committed a crime in the Colony; the convicts were made to do various jobs, including spinning and weaving. Parramatta cloth was initially a coarse low-grade cloth, also known as “factory cloth”, a type of slop cloth made of wool. The Parramatta Female Factory also produced linen cloth for convicts’ clothing.

== Later products ==
In 1815 Simeon Lord established a factory at Botany Bay where cloth from Parramatta was finished and dyed, producing a high quality, and expensive, tweed. This cloth gained enough of a reputation to be imitated by English manufacturers in Bradford, who later marketed their own products as Parramatta Cloth.

=== Variations ===
PIECE GOODS MANUAL refers Paramatta as a lightweight fabric woven with a specific twill pattern using cotton and Botany worsted yarns. It is commonly used for making waterproof items.

== See also ==
- Negro cloth or Lowell cloth was a coarse and strong cloth used for slaves' clothing in the West Indies and the Southern Colonies.
