= Philip Ruddock Heritage Centre =

- Parramatta Archaeological Site
- Location within Sydney Location within Australia
- 33°48′53″S 151°00′04″E
- Location: 45 Macquarie Street, Parramatta, New South Wales, Australia

Site notes
- Owner: Crown Group

New South Wales Heritage Register
- Official name: Archaeological Site and Associated Artefacts; V by Crown; 45 Macquarie Street; Wheatsheaf Hotel & Convict Hut Archaeological Site; Foundry/Blacksmithy; Industrial Archaeological Site
- Type: State heritage (archaeological-terrestrial)
- Designated: 5 July 2019
- Reference no.: 2027
- Type: Other – Urban Area
- Category: Urban Area

Philip Ruddock Heritage Centre is a heritage-listed urban facility at 45 Macquarie Street, Parramatta, New South Wales, Australia. It is also known as Archaeological Site and Associated Artefacts and V by Crown; 45 Macquarie Street; Wheatsheaf Hotel & Convict Hut Archaeological Site; Foundry/Blacksmithy; Industrial Archaeological Site and Parramatta Archaeological Site, named after the former member of Parliament for Parramatta Philip Ruddock. The property is privately owned. The site was added to the New South Wales State Heritage Register on 5 July 2019.

== History ==
=== Aboriginal and first contact history ===
The land at Parramatta was the traditional home of the Burramatta people of the Darug language group who had lived there for some 60,000 years before the arrival of the English colonists. The Burramatta people were a coastal or salt water people, a group boardering the area between the coast and the hinterland. Their traditional lands were a place where the hinterland and coastal groups met to trade and perform ceremonial battles and hold corrobores.

The word Burramatta means place of the eel and the eel was the totem symbol for the local people. Each year eels gathered at a particular place where the salt water meets the freshwater to "lie down" and fatten up for their journey north to the Coral Sea to spawn. During this time the eels made a significant contribution to the Burramattagal diet. Women fished from boats and men speared fish from the riverbanks or hunted possum in the woodland areas and yam and fruits were gathered from the land. Grass seeds were collected and crushed on stones and later processed into a dough for cooking. Other stones found in the Parramatta area were large and rounded.

In April Captain Arthur Phillip sailed up the Parramatta River and declared the land around present day Parramatta to be suitable place for a 'gaol town and farm." By September Phillip declared a settlement at what was then called Rose Hill. Initially there was some bartering between the Burramattagal and the colonists but with increased settlement and the alienation of more and more land by the colonists relations soured. The farms destroyed the yam beds and settlement did not allow the local people to freely move through their lands. Facing the diminishing of traditional foods sources, the Burramattagal took to harvesting the new crops of corn which met with retaliation from the farmers.

In 1789 another blow to the indigenous population occurred when their population was decimated by the outbreak of smallpox. While the population was reduced the many indigenous people of western Sydney including the Burramattagal continued to resist the colonial settlers. From 1790, Pemulwuy was widely seen to be the leader of the conflict and resistance against settlers in outlying settlements including Parramatta, Toongabbie, Georges River and Brickfield Hill. In 1797 he was severely wounded during a raid on the government farm at Toongabbie. He was taken to hospital where he subsequently recovered, escaped and continued to fight. Four years later in 1801, Governor King declared that Aboriginals near Parramatta, Georges River and Prospect could be shot on sight and in the following year Pemulwuy was shot by a group of settlers.

While first contact resulted in the reduction of the Aboriginal population all over NSW, many people of the western Sydney area including Parramatta, survived and their descendants still live in the area today.

=== History of the township of Parramatta ===
The following historical overview has been sourced and summarised primarily from the excavation report prepared by Edward Higgenbotham and Associates with historical research by Terry Kass, which provides a comprehensive historical background for the site.

The site is in an area of early European settlement in Parramatta, or Rose Hill as it was originally known, which began in late 1788 as a farm to provide much needed crops for the new colony. The Rose Hill farm was converted into a town in 1790 and renamed Parramatta in June 1791. Initial development in the town centred on what are now George, Macquarie and Church Streets, with the construction of several public and government buildings.

While some early town leases were granted to prominent free persons, such as civil servants or members of the NSW Corps, most of the town allotments were occupied by convict huts. The allotments on which these stood generally measured 100 feet by 200 feet and the convict huts were usually 24 feet by 12 feet, containing two rooms one slightly larger than the other to house between 10 and 14 convicts. The large allotment size was to allow for the convict residents to establish household gardens for fruit and vegetables. In November 1790, Watkin Tench described the town has containing 32 completed convict huts occupied by men on either side of the main street (now George Street), with an additional nine huts for women on what is now Church Street, and several other huts occupied by convict families. By the following year, there were approximately 100 convict huts in Parramatta.

While the town was primarily at this stage a goal town it was not long before town leases were occupied by free persons. In 1796 the first town lease in Parramatta was let to John McArthur for 14 years and was occupied by a former convict who was pardoned in 1794, James Larra. The number of town leases granted to free persons (both emancipists and free settlers) gradually increased between 1800 and 1809.

After his establishment as Governor of New South Wales, Macquarie escalated this trend. Macquarie took the view that the township of Parramatta and other towns should be the domain of the free settler and that convicts should be housed in a way that the government could keep a tight rein on the supervision and control of the convict population. To this end, by 1821, a new convict barracks was constructed at Parramatta, removing the need for convict huts on the allotments within the town.

Governor Brisbane granted new town leases in Parramatta in 1823, and on 30 June over 300 leases were made, with many of the town's inhabitants gaining secure title. With the increase in the free population and the laying out of several new streets, Parramatta soon grew from a penal, gaol town into a fully-fledged market town.

=== Site specific history ===
==== Allotment 16 – remains of convict hut, brick cottage and wheelwrights Workshop ====
The archaeological site at 45 Macquarie Street contains the remains of a convict hut which was built around 1800. This hut on Allotment 16 was inhabited by a John Paisley until 1823. In 1823 it was occupied by John Walker who was a wheelwright, an Australian born man who married an Australian born woman.

It seems he may have started his working life as a wheelwright working for a Hugh Taylor and later went on to run his own successful business. During the 1820s there is evidence the convict hut was used as a bakery and then in the late 1820s Walker added a wheelwrights workshop to the western side of the hut.

In 1839 the permissive occupancy for allotment 16 was converted to a Town Grant in John Walkers name and between the years of 1836 and 1844 the original convict hut was replaced by a brick cottage comprising two large rooms flanking a central hall way with a skillion at the rear and attic rooms above. Evidence of various extensions over the life of the house are revealed in the excavation.

After John Walker died in 1846 his wife continued to live in the house until 1875. At this time the wife sold the property to John Pratt, a local fruit dealer who soon subdivided the land into two parcels and sold the western parcel on and the western part sold for (Pounds)260, indicating that it already had a house on it. A weatherboard cottage had been erected, but was replaced in 1911 by a Federation-style house.. The eastern parcel was later sold to a Coach Maker, who retained the cottage. Subsequent owners up to the early 1950s when it became the premises of three Dr Maloufs, retained the cottage.

==== Allotment 17 and 18 – Basement of the Shepherd and Flock Inn ====
Originally there were three convict huts in on the site facing Macquarie Street - on Allotments 16, as discussed above; on Allotment 17, where the basement and drain of the shepherd and Flock is located; and Allotment 18 on the corner of Marsden and Macquarie Streets. The hut on Allotment 18 was the site of the Wheatsheaf Hotel between 1801 and 1809, making it one of the earliest hotels in Parramatta. Unfortunately the evidence of convict huts on Lots 17 and 18 was so poorly preserved that they could not be preserved in situ and so the majority of the area of Allotment 18 is not included in the SHR listing.

Allotment 18 was, from at least 1823, leased to Thomas Reynolds which had become the Shepherd and Flock Inn by 1825. Reynolds was a convict transported to the colony in 1816 on the Ocean. Recommended for emancipation by Rowland Hassel he became a free man in 1820. He married a colonial born woman, Mary Reynolds in 1820 and by 1823 had leased the Allotment 18. Reynolds purchased the neighbouring property in 1823 from William Sully and extended the hotel into this area. The cellar is associated with this extension.

The Shepherd and Flock Inn closed in 1870.

==== Recent history ====
All buildings on the site had been demolished by the early 1950s, and the area was used as a carpark.

The area was identified as PHALMS AMU 3190. The site is included in the Parramatta Historical Archaeological Landscape Management Study (PHALMS) completed in 2001 as Archaeological Management Unit (AMU) 3190, likely to contain intact archaeological resources of State significance including the sites of convict huts. The area was excavated in 2005. In 2012 construction began on the "V by Crown" development at 45 Macquarie Street, Parramatta. The innovatively designed residential/commercial development was completed in 2015. In mid-2017 the "V Heritage" Archaeology Display Centre was opened and celebrates the completion of the conservation and interpretive display of the archaeological relics.

== Description ==
The Main Display Area includes archaeological remains of the convict hut, built c. 1800 on Allotment 16, Section 12, Town of Parramatta. The archaeological excavations in 2005 revealed how the hut was extended and altered until the 1836–1844. The most significant addition was a wheelwright's workshop on the west side of the convict hut, built by John Walker after he leased the allotment from the Crown in 1823. Remains of a sandstone working floor, spattered with molten iron and also two forges were located in this area. Other important changes to the convict hut included the addition of a brick floor and two large fireplaces on the south wall, one of which may have been a bread oven.

The convict hut and its extensions were demolished between 1836 and 1844 to be replaced by a substantial brick cottage with sandstone foundations. There were two large front rooms, a central hallway, front verandah and rear skillion rooms. Above the main rooms were attic bedrooms with dormer windows. The back wall of the skillion had collapsed due to saturation of the soil during a period of heavy rain, coupled with poor drainage. A large timber outbuilding was built over these footings to extend the back of the house in the late nineteenth century. The cottage was finally demolished in the 1950s but the land remained vacant until the 1990s. A failed development resulted in a series of concrete piles being drilled through the archaeological remains, but left most of the site intact.

The second Display Area includes the cellar of the Shepherd and Flock Inn, licensed from 1825 to 1870. The stone built cellar, with intact timber floor, was backfilled with demolition material and a layer of charcoal, indicating alarge fire. The dating of the cellar could only be resolved during the archaeological investigations to open up the site for display in 2016. The cellar is now known to have straddled the boundary between Allotments 17 and 18. Allotment 18 was leased to John Graham on 1 January 1806. It was the site of the Wheatsheaf Hotel from 1801 to 1809, which was housed within a typical convict hut and its extensions. The allotment was leased to Thomas Reynolds in 1823, when he also bought the lease to Allotment 17.

The cellar was built over the site of the east wall of the former convict hut on Allotment 17, thus revealing the encroachment onto Allotment 17. Neither of the convict huts on Allotments 17 and 18 could be conserved in situ, since their remains were so poorly preserved.

=== Condition ===
As at 5 August 2005, of the sites on the Macquarie Street frontage, the remains on former Allotment 16 and the cellar on Allotment 17-18 were preserved in a condition that was suitable for conservation, interpretation and display. Both the cellar and the lower levels of the convict hut presented waterlogged or anaerobic conditions, allowing for the preservation of the timber floor of the cellar and some of the lower timbers of the convict hut. Not all the timbers could be conserved and in some cases modern timbers have been used to indicate the positions of original timbers in the displays.

One of the most unusual features was the depth of stratigraphy on Allotment 16, with over a metre from the original topsoil to the current kerb height on Macquarie Street. Pollen samples were taken from the soil profile, revealing the changing environment over time and the presence of cereal pollen at the beginning of historical settlement, when Rose Hill was a government farm from 1788 to 1790. The depth of stratigraphy also allowed assemblages from each period of occupation to be treated separately, revealing the paucity of material comforts for the early convict occupants

=== Modifications and dates ===
- Initial development of the allotments on the Macquarie Street frontage is dated to c. 1800.
- Allotment 16 was leased to John Walker in 1823. Construction of the wheelwright's workshop.

Other extensions to the convict hut

- Demolition of convict hut and wheelwright's workshop between 1836 and 1844. Construction of new brick cottage.
- Cottage demolished in the 1950s.

Allotment 18

- Site of Wheatsheaf Hotel from 1801 to 1809.
- Allotment leased to Thomas Reynolds in 1823. Purchase of Allotment 17 by Reynolds in 1823.
- License of Shepherd and Flock Inn from 1825 to 1870.
- Cellar built partly on Allotment 17 as extension of the hotel in the 1820s.
- Two storey terraced house built on western side of Allotment 17 in the 1890s.

Other development postdates hotel.

=== Further information ===
The depth of stratigraphy on the Macquarie Street frontage of Allotment 16 preserved intact the remains of the convict hut and its extensions, including the wheelwrights workshop. These were overlain by demolition layers and only partially cut through by the later brick cottage, built between 1836 and 1844. The demolition of the cottage in the 1950s also provided protection for the underlying archaeology. Initially it was thought that the concrete piers from the failed 1990s development had destroyed the archaeological remains, but excavation proved their intactness. Because the site had been in a low lying and poorly drained area, there was a historical tendency to build up the ground around the archaeological sites to the level of Macquarie Street, in order to avoid flooding. The preservation of the archaeological remains on Allotment 16 is therefore largely due to this accumulation of layers and to waterlogging of the lower soil profile.

The adjacent buildings on Allotment 17 and 18 were located on higher ground and did not therefore have a similar stratigraphic history. These sites tended to be cut down to the level of the adjacent streets. This resulted in the poor preservation of building remains except for the most recent, but did allow the deep cellar of the Shepherd Inn to survive.

== Heritage listing ==
As at 17 January 2019, the two in situ archaeological displays at 45 Macquarie Street, Parramatta are of state heritage significance for their historical values demonstrating the development of Parramatta, the second settlement in NSW, from a Goal Town to a Market Town between the years 1790 and 1823. The in situ remains and wealth of individual artefacts collected from the site, some of which are on permanent display, are compelling evidence of the important role of convicts, native born and free migrants in this transformation.

The archaeological site is of state significance as pollen samples from the site are evidence of the first crops, including cereal crops of barley sown in Parramatta from 1788 to 1790.

The site is of state heritage significance for its aesthetic values as examples of traditional building and construction technology and for the visual appeal or attractiveness of the in-situ retention of the archaeological remains.

The site and its treatment archaeologically as an in-situ museum, is of state significance for the esteem in which it is held in the community, including the community of archaeologists, heritage professionals and those with an interest in our colonial beginnings, not only in Parramatta, but also New South Wales and nationally.

The archaeological site is of state heritage significance for its research significance as the excavation has provided evidence relating to a number of research questions relating to the development of Parramatta, the colony's second settlement, from a Gaol Town to Market Town and the progress of settlement in New South Wales as a whole.

The Archaeological Site at 45 Macquarie Street, Parramatta is of state heritage significance as it contains a rare well-preserved example of a "convict hut" in the second settlement in the colony of NSW.

It also has state level rarity values as, unlike other sites at Parramatta, it provides clear physical evidence of an early convict hut as well as later layers of the sites occupation as a bakery, wheel wrights workshop, masonry residence and evidence of the origins and expansion of the Shepherd and Flock Hotel. As such it clearly demonstrates the transformation of the settlement at Parramatta from a Gaol Town to a Market Town in the early decades of European occupation.

The site is of state heritage significance as a rare example of the management of an important archaeological site to be retained and conserved in situ rather than excavated and salvaged off site.

The archaeological site at 45 Macquarie St Parramatta is of state heritage significance as a fine example of a remnant "convict hut" at one of the four original colonial settlements. It also represents the evolution and growth of Parramatta and the colony in its first 50 to 60 years.

Parramatta Archaeological Site was listed on the New South Wales State Heritage Register on 5 July 2019 having satisfied the following criteria.

The place is important in demonstrating the course, or pattern, of cultural or natural history in New South Wales.

The two in situ archaeological displays and associated artefacts are of state heritage significance for their historical values demonstrating the development of Parramatta, the second settlement in NSW, from a Goal Town to a Market Town between the years 1790 and 1823. There is compelling evidence on site of the important role of convicts, native born and free migrants in this transformation.

Allotment 16 was occupied by firstly by a convict named John Paisley and later a colonial born man John Walker who eventually established a wheel wrights workshop on the property. He prospered and replaced the convict hut with a brick cottage. The basement remains are of a hotel established by Thomas Reynolds, a convict who made good in the town of Parramatta in the decades from the 1820s to the late 1840s. The Shepherd and Flock was established on the site of one of the earlier hotels in the area. The basement, located on adjacent land bought to extend the hotel premises, demonstrates the growth of the township and colonial society in the early to mid-19th century.

The Archaeological Site and associated artefacts are of state significance as pollen samples from the site have been analysed and shown to contain which contain pollens from cereal from the first crops sown in Parramatta from 1788 to 1790.

John Walker died in 1846, but his widow lived in the house until 1875.

The convict hut on the corner of Marsden Street was leased to John Graham on 1 January 1806. This lease is one of only two pre 1823 leases that can be located on the south side of Macquarie Street. It was the site of the Wheatsheaf Hotel from 1801 to 1809, one of the earlier hotels in Parramatta. The allotment was leased to Thomas Reynolds in 1823 and by 1825 had become the Shepherd and Flock Inn. Reynolds had purchased the neighbouring Allotment 17 in 1823, enabling him to extend the Hotel across this boundary. The cellar therefore represents an extension of the Wheatsheaf / later Shepherd Inn building, which closed in 1870. Both allotments are important examples of the trends of development from a gaol town to a market town, a process that had largely been completed by 1823.

The place is important in demonstrating aesthetic characteristics and/or a high degree of creative or technical achievement in New South Wales.

The Archaeological Site and associated artefacts at 45 Macquarie Street are of state heritage significance as it is the first archaeological excavation in Parramatta that revealed remains of a convict hut. Most convict huts reveal only a pattern of post-holes. This convict hut retained waterlogged timber posts, but more importantly a brick floor, associated ovens and the adjacent wheelwrights workshop, showing how the building was extended and used for different purposes over time. The later walls of the overlying 1840s cottage reveal well-built sandstone and brick walls of a large cottage. The remains of buildings and the cellar possess aesthetic significance as examples of traditional building technology and for visual appeal or attractiveness of the in-situ retention of the remains.

The place has a strong or special association with a particular community or cultural group in New South Wales for social, cultural or spiritual reasons.

The site and collection are of state significance as the investigation, conservation and management of the heritage values of the subject site is deemed of interest and concern to a broader community, including the community of archaeologists, heritage professionals and those with an interest in our colonial beginnings, not only in Parramatta, but also New South Wales and nationally.

The place has potential to yield information that will contribute to an understanding of the cultural or natural history of New South Wales.

The Archaeological Site and associated artefacts, 45 Macquarie Street, Parramatta, is of state heritage significance for its research significance as the excavation has provided evidence relating to a number of research questions about the foundation of the colony of NSW. The findings contribute to our understanding of the site, the development of Parramatta, the colony's second settlement, from a Gaol Town to Market Town and the progress of settlement in New South Wales as a whole.

The place possesses uncommon, rare or endangered aspects of the cultural or natural history of New South Wales.

The Archaeological Site and associated artefacts at 45 Macquarie Street, Parramatta are of state heritage significance as it contains a rare, well preserved example of a convict hut in the second settlement in the colony of NSW. While other huts in Parramatta and the other first four settlements in NSW have evidence of convict huts, this site is unique in that there are significant samples of timber surviving in the post holes for the hut on allotment 16. There is also evidence of convict hut at allotment 18 although this is not so well preserved.

The site also demonstrates the transformation of the settlement at Parramatta from a Gaol Town to a Market Town through evidence of the transformation of the convict hut on allotment 16 is firstly adapted to a residence and then replaced with a timber and masonry house as the occupant, John Walker, established his business as a Wheelwright and prospered. The basement of the Shepherd and Flock Hotel demonstrates the evolution of the site at Allotment 18 from convict hut to hotel and the further expansion of the hotel as the proprietor, Thomas Reynolds improves his business through the early to mid-1800s.

The site had a substantial depth of stratigraphy, enabling separation of the artefact assemblage into several datable phases, from convict occupation, through to the 1880s and later.

The site is also of state heritage significance as a rare example of the management of an important archaeological site to be retained and conserved in situ rather than excavated and salvaged off site. Of the 48 terrestrial -archaeological sites listed on the SHR this is one of only five sites of excavated archaeology dating from the early colonial years which has been retained, conserved and interpreted in situ.

The place is important in demonstrating the principal characteristics of a class of cultural or natural places/environments in New South Wales.

The Archaeological Site and associated artefacts at 45 Macquarie Street is of state heritage significance as a fine example of a convict hut at one of the four original colonial settlements. It also represents the evolution and growth of Parramatta and the colony in its first 50 to 60 years.

The information that has been gained from the study of the assemblages from this site provide representative examples of the information that can be gained from artefact analysis.

== See also ==
- Parramatta Hospital Archaeological Site
