= Ann Gordon (superintendent) =

British born Australian factory superintendent

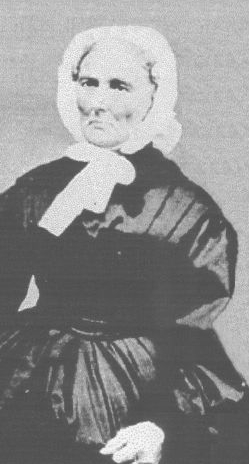
- Born: Ann King c. 1795; Portsmouth
- Died: 6 June 1868 (aged 72–73); East Maitland
- Occupation: de facto Prison governor
- Employer: Colony of New South Wales
- Known for: running the Parramatta Female Factory
- Spouse: Robert Gordon
- Children: 5

Ann Gordon born Ann King (1795 – 6 June 1868) was a British born Australian female factory superintendent at the Parramatta Female Factory in the Colony of New South Wales. She ran the factory, nicknamed "Gordons’ Villa", for women convicts, from a riot in 1827, until she was dismissed in 1836.

== Life ==
Gordon was born in Portsmouth in about 1795. Her parents were Ann (born Ovey) and her husband James King - who was a courier employed by the government. She and her sister both married in 1812. She married an Irish soldier, Robert Gordon, at the local parish church on Portsea Island St Mary's Church.

She ended up in Australia as her husband enlisted in the 48th (Northamptonshire) Regiment of Foot when they were in Ireland. He and the regiment were sent to the colony of New South Wales. Ann went with him, but their baby daughter Letitia was left in Ireland with her grandparents. They had two more children in Newcastle before her husband left the army. They became settlers and in 1825 they were granted land in Burragorang, New South Wales but they did not work it as in 1827 Ann was employed and her husband became "the keeper".

== Parramatta Female Factory ==
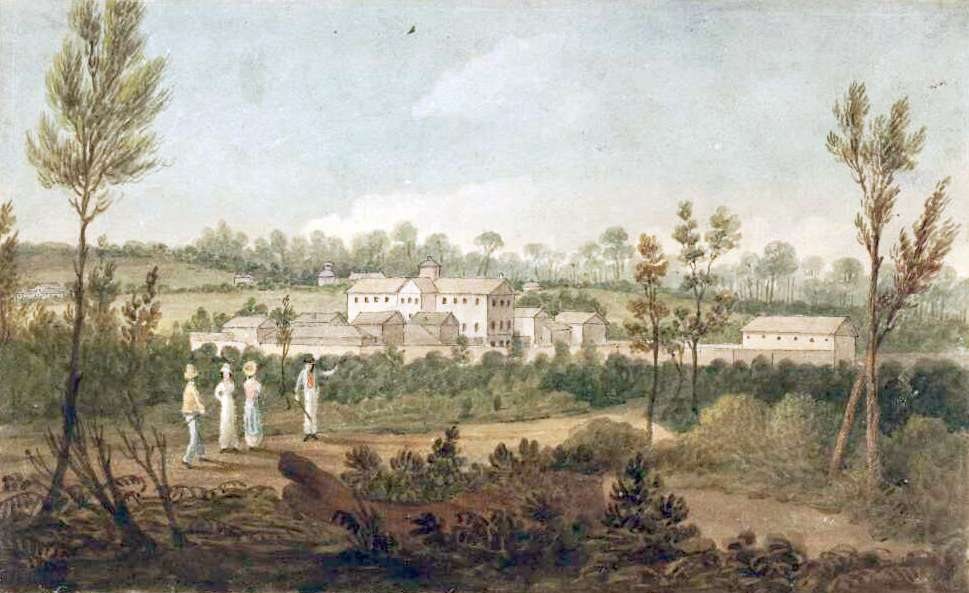
Parramatta Female Factory in about 1826

In October 1827, the Parramatta Female Factory was the site of women rioting as a response to a cut in rations and their poor conditions. The matron, Mrs Raine, had resigned and she had to be rescued from the factory. Gordon began her work as the factory's new matron and superintendent with her first task being to negotiate with the women who had escaped from the building. She was able to persuade them to return, but the disputed ration of bread and sugar remained. In less than an hour over 100 women escaped en masse and proceeded into the town where 40 soldiers and the threat of guns brought them back. They returned with a plunder of foodstuffs and when the ringleaders were confined, the mob released them.

Gordon had been appointed by the Governor of New South Wales, Ralph Darling. He had complained previously that there was no one available to take the role. Darling had offered the position to Gordon at £150 per annum (£50 less per year than her predecessor). Ann, her husband Robert, and their children, were given free fuel and quarters and she became one of the best paid women in the colony. Darling was supportive of Gordon as she endeavoured to introduce smooth management into the factory. There was another riot in 1831 which was the year Darling stood down. Gordon had several assistant matrons and four other staff including a constable, but they were not always co-operative. Under the new governor Richard Bourke the number of women increased at the factory and conditions and behaviour suffered. 1833 saw another riot.

Gordon became well known in the locality. The factory was nicknamed Gordons’ Villa and even Gordon's Nunnery or Seminary.

By 1835 Gordon had supplemented the staff with trusted women convicts who served as midwife and overseers. Gossip grew, that immorality at the factory included her husband Robert Gordon, and that the governor's son, Richard Bourke, was the father of Gordon's grandchildren.

Robert was dismissed in 1835 and in 1836 Ann Gordon was dismissed, although Bourke said she was not at fault and she received a years salary in compensation. Bourke told his superiors that he had introduced order at the factory. Gordon was replaced by Sarah and Thomas Bell who were the new matron and "the keeper".

Gordon tried to regain her position as a matron, but she was not successful. Robert became a licensee of the "Jolly Sailor" in Parramatta, but according to Ann he never worked for a decade and he spent all the money she gave him. She was a widow in 1863 and she died in 1868 in East Maitland.
