= Richard Bourke =

British Army officer and colonial administrator (1777–1855)

General Sir Richard Bourke KCB
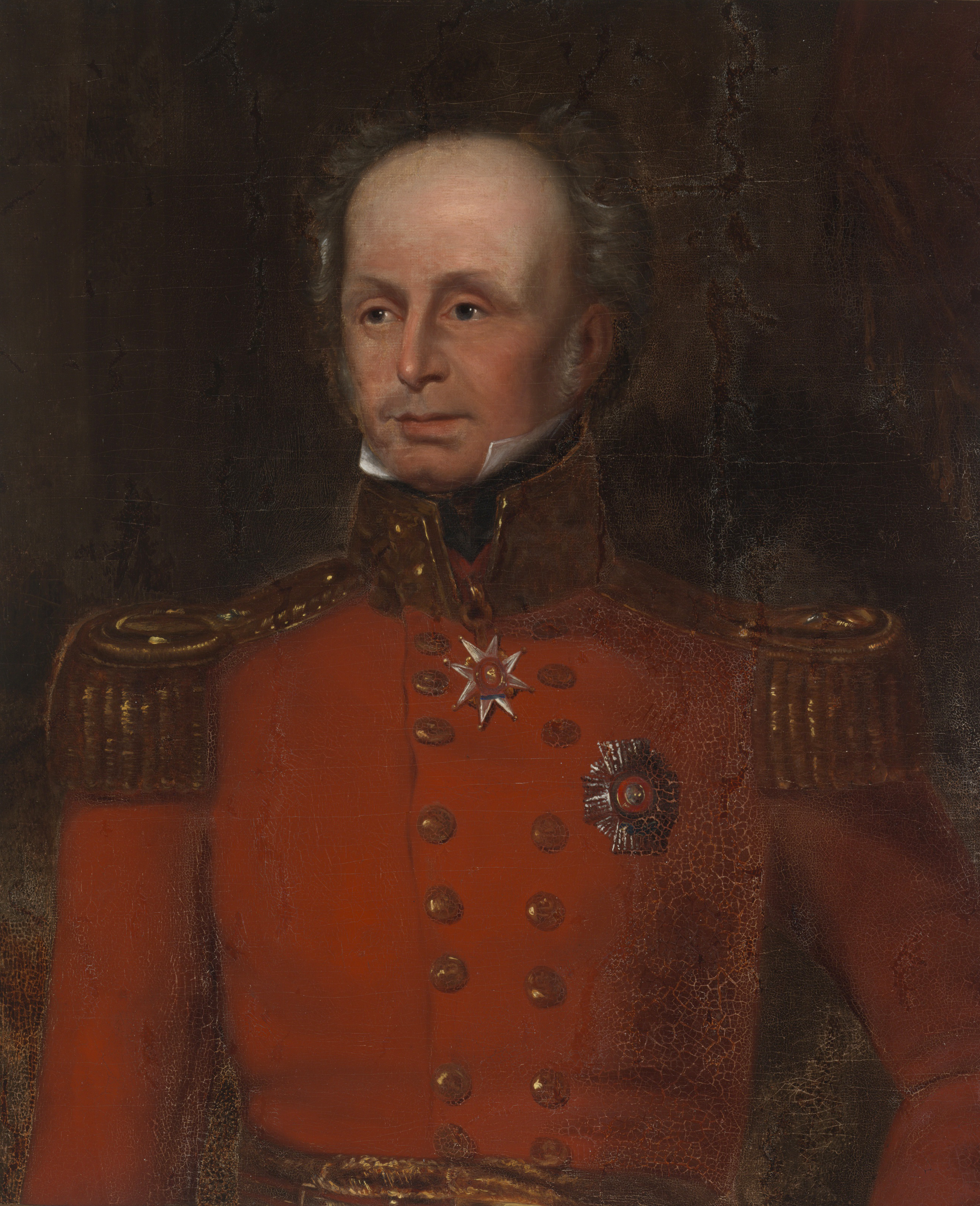
- Portrait by Martin Archer Shee, c. 1837–1850

8th Governor of New South Wales
- In office 3 December 1831 – 5 December 1837
- Monarchs: William IV; Queen Victoria
- Preceded by: Sir Ralph Darling
- Succeeded by: George Gipps

Personal details
- Born: 4 May 1777 Dublin, Ireland
- Died: 12 August 1855 (aged 78) County Limerick, Ireland
- Spouse: Elizabeth Jane Bourke

Military service
- Allegiance: Great Britain; United Kingdom
- Branch/service: British Army
- Years of service: 1798–1855
- Rank: General
- Battles/wars: French Revolutionary Wars; Anglo-Russian invasion of Holland; Napoleonic Wars; British invasions of the River Plate; Siege of Montevideo (1807); Peninsular War
- Awards: Knight Commander of the Order of the Bath

Sir Richard Bourke (4 May 1777 – 12 August 1855) was a British Army officer and colonial administrator who served as the governor of New South Wales from 1831 to 1837. As a lifelong Whig (liberal), he encouraged the emancipation of convicts and helped bring forward the ending of penal transportation to Australia. In this, he faced strong opposition from the landlord establishment and its press. He approved a new settlement on the Yarra River, and named it Melbourne, in honour of the incumbent British prime minister, Lord Melbourne.

== Early life ==
Bourke was born on 4 May 1777 in Dublin, Ireland, the son of Anne (née Ryan) and John Bourke. His mother was from County Tipperary and his father from Dromsally in County Limerick. He was educated in England at Westminster School before reading law at Christ Church, Oxford. He was a distant relation of philosopher Edmund Burke, whose home he frequently visited.

== Military career ==
After securing the patronage of William Windham, a friend of Edmund Burke, he secured an appointment as ensign in the British Army's 1st Regiment of Foot Guards in 1798. He served in the Anglo-Russian invasion of Holland in 1799 and was badly wounded in the jaw, which gave him a lifelong speech impediment and contributed to his decision not to seek a political career. Bourke was promoted to lieutenant and then captain in the same year and major in 1805. The following year he was promoted again to lieutenant colonel and made superintendent of the junior department at the Royal Military College, Sandhurst.

In 1807, Bourke participated in the British invasions of the River Plate as quartermaster general, taking part in the siege of Montevideo and the Battle of Buenos Aires. He was promoted to major general in 1821. He retired from active service after the Peninsular War to live on his Irish estate, but eventually sought government office to increase his income.

== Lieutenant-Governor of the Cape Colony ==
Bourke was appointed to the Cape Colony in 1825 and was promoted to Lieutenant-Governor of the Eastern District of the Cape of Good Hope, acting as governor for both the eastern and western districts until 1828. Under Bourke's governorship, much was done to reform the old mercantilist system of government inherited from the Dutch East India Company at the Cape.

Bourke also introduced laws that upheld the property rights of the indigenous Khoekhoe people, although this legislation was aimed to facilitate the exploitation of the Khoekhoe as cheap labourers.

== Governor of New South Wales ==
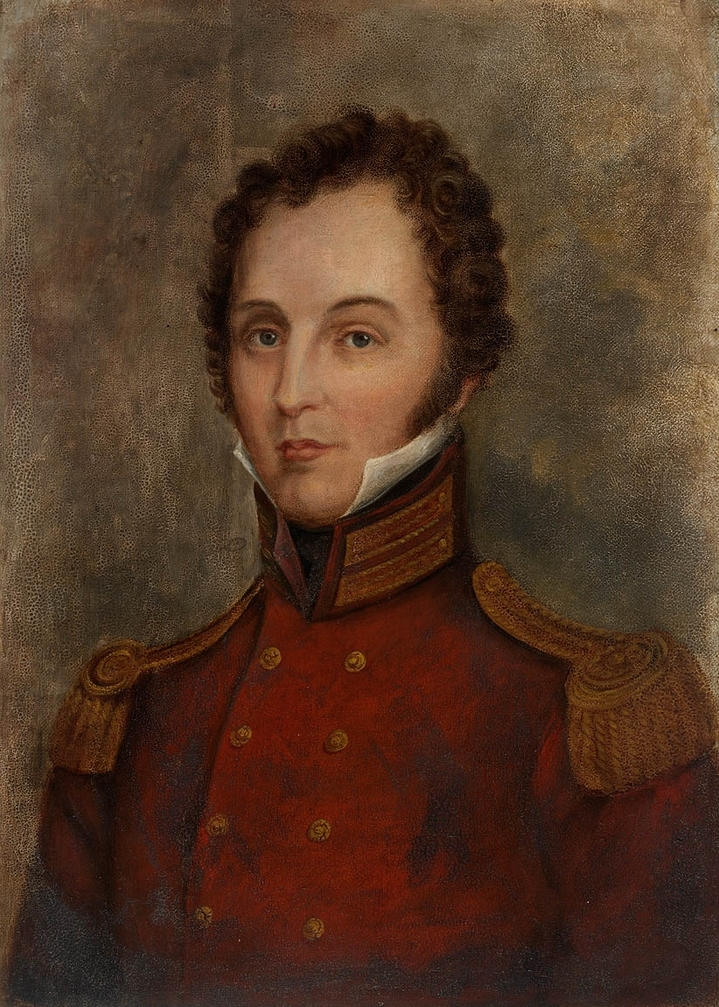
Bourke c. 1835

Bourke was an avowed Whig. In November 1830, the Whigs won government in a climate of reform, and Bourke was appointed to succeed Sir Ralph Darling, who was also Irish-born, as Governor of New South Wales in 1831. Bourke proved to be an able, if controversial, governor. In most of his efforts, he faced entrenched opposition from the local conservatives: the 'exclusive' faction in the New South Wales Legislative Council, and the Colonial Secretary Alexander Macleay and the Colonial Treasurer Campbell Riddell. The newspaper The Sydney Morning Herald always opposed him. (The exclusives were hostile to the participation of ex-convicts ('emancipists') in civil life, hence were opposed to changes which moved the colony from military to civil governance.) Bourke described himself as being "pretty much in the situation that Earl Grey would find himself in if all members of his Cabinet were Ultra Tories and he could neither turn them out nor leave them".

Bourke had authority from the Colonial Office to extend trial by jury and substitute civil for military juries in criminal cases. He managed this despite fierce opposition from the legislature, and his 1833 bill for the extension of juries was only passed with his casting vote and with conservative amendments.

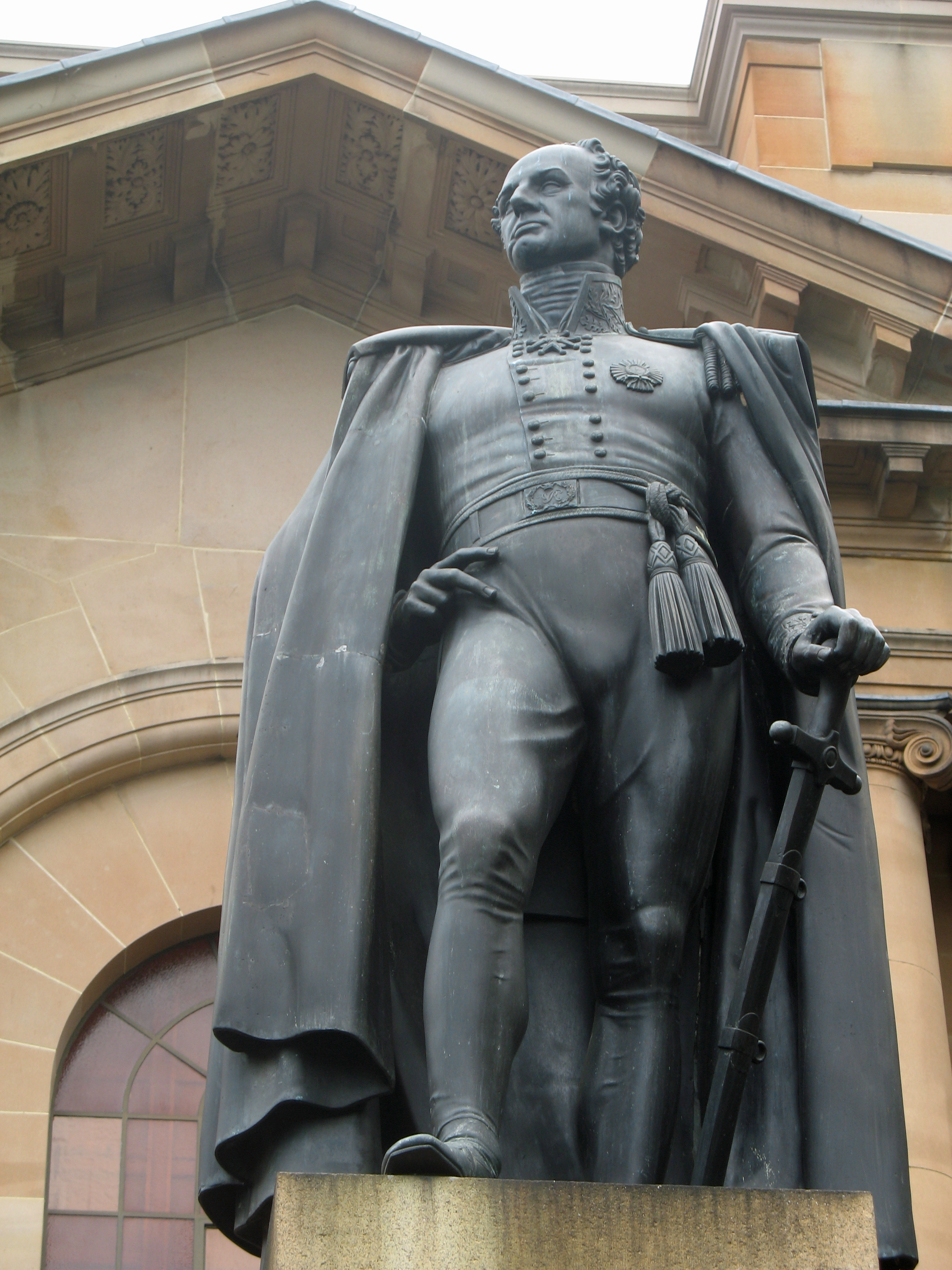
A statue of General Sir Richard Bourke, the first public statue ever erected in Australia, stands outside the State Library of New South Wales in Sydney.

Appalled by the excessive punishments doled out to convicts, Governor Bourke initiated the Magistrates Act, which simplified existing regulations and limited the sentence a magistrate could pass to 50 lashes (previously no such limit existed). The bill was passed by the legislature because Bourke presented evidence that magistrates were exceeding their powers and passing illegal sentences, in part because regulations were complex and confusing. However, furious magistrates and employers petitioned the crown against this interference with their legal rights, fearing that a reduction in punishments would cease to provide enough deterrence to the convicts, and this issue was exploited by his opponents.

In 1835, Bourke issued a proclamation through the Colonial Office, implementing the doctrine of terra nullius by proclaiming that Indigenous Australians could not sell or assign land, nor could an individual person acquire it, other than through distribution by the Crown. This proclamation, which effectively deprived indigenous Australians of legal recognition as land owners under colonial law, was prompted by an exploitative attempt to acquire land from local people, under a private treaty, Batman's Treaty.

In 1837 a statue of Bourke by English sculptor Edward Hodges Baily was erected to Bourke in Sydney.

Bourke continued to create controversy within the colony by combating the inhumane treatment handed out to convicts, including limiting the number of convicts each employer was allowed to 70, as well as granting rights to emancipists, such as allowing the acquisition of property and service on juries. It has been argued that the abolition of convict transportation to New South Wales in 1840 can be attributable to the actions of Bourke.

In the 1836 Church Act, Bourke abolished the status of the Anglican Church as the state church of New South Wales, declaring each Christian denomination on equal footing for government assistance. The law did not extend to Jews and other non-Christian religions, and so actually introduced a form of discrimination, by precluding government assistance to them, which took until August 1854 to rectify. Bourke also increased spending on education and attempted to set up a system of public nondenominational schools. He was credited as the first governor to publish satisfactory accounts of public receipts and expenditures.

In 1837, the year of his promotion to lieutenant-general, he was made colonel for life of the 64th (2nd Staffordshire) Regiment of Foot. The same year, he named the town of Melbourne after The 2nd Viscount Melbourne, the British Prime Minister. He returned to England in 1838, traversing the Andes to avoid a voyage around Cape Horn.

== Later life and legacy ==
Bourke was promoted to general in 1851. He died at his residence, Thornfield House, Ahane, in County Limerick, Ireland, on Sunday 12 August 1855 and is buried in Stradbally Cemetery in Castleconnell.

Bourke Street in Melbourne's central business district and the town of Bourke were named after him. The County of Bourke, Victoria, which includes Melbourne, and Bourke County, New South Wales, were also named after him. Elizabeth Street, Melbourne, is generally considered to be named in honour of his wife.

The bronze statue of Bourke outside the State Library of New South Wales in Sydney was the first public statue ever erected in Australia. It was dedicated on 11 April 1842. It records his accomplishments as governor in florid detail. It was funded by public subscription and made by Edward Hodges Baily in London.

== Family ==
Bourke married Elizabeth, daughter of John Bourke, Receiver-General of the land tax for Middlesex; they had a son, Richard, and three daughters. One daughter, Anne Maria, married the Australian administrator and politician Sir Edward Deas Thomson, and was an ancestor of the Barons Altrincham. Another daughter, Frances, married Rev. John Jebb, nephew and namesake of a Bishop of Limerick. His daughter Mary Jane married Dudley Montague Perceval, the fifth son of Prime Minister Spencer Perceval, an administrator at the Cape of Good Hope during Bourke's tenure as Lieutenant Governor.

In 1836 Bourke changed the matron of Parramatta Female Factory from Ann Gordon to another. There were rumours that Bourke's son was the father of children born to Ann Gordon's daughters.

== In popular culture ==
- Bourke is a supporting character in the 1937 novel Under Capricorn.

Government offices
| Preceded by Lord Charles Somerset | Governor of the Cape Colony (Acting); 1826–1828 | Succeeded by Sir Lowry Cole |
| Preceded by Ralph Darling | Governor of New South Wales; 1831–1837 | Succeeded by George Gipps |
Military offices
| Preceded by Sir William Pringle | Colonel of the 64th (2nd Staffordshire) Regiment of Foot; 1837–1855 | Succeeded by Sir James Freeth |
