= Bus operators in Sydney =

Transport operators in Sydney, New South Wales, Australia

Sydney, Australia is served by a number of bus operators, with Transit Systems the largest privately owned operator in New South Wales as of January 2024 when the company took-over Transdev Liverpool, Busabout and Interline. Other major operators include CDC and Busways. Most services are provided as part of the city's integrated public transport system, with routes, fares, service levels, fleet specifications and customer service standards determined by Transport for NSW. A small number of services operate outside of this network.

== History ==
Until the 1990s, all of Sydney's private bus services were run by family owned companies. The Passenger Transport Act 1990 requiring average fleet ages to be maintained at no more than 12 years and minimum service levels, resulted in many of the smaller operators selling out to larger operators.

But even these larger operators such as Baxter's, Busways, North & Western, Shorelink, South Trans, Transit First and Westbus, were still owned by Australian families. In the late 1990s and early 2000s multi-national transport operators including Connex, ComfortDelGro, National Express and Transdev began to buy up some of these larger operators.

In March 2004, the Minister for Transport released the final report of Barrie Unsworth's Review of Bus Services in NSW. At that stage Sydney's bus operating contracts were divided into 87 contract areas. After recommendations from Unsworth's report, the contract regions were consolidated into 15 regions with seven year contracts negotiated with the operators. These contracts are known as Sydney Metropolitan Bus Service Contracts.

== Contract regions ==
Bus contracts in Sydney are known as the Sydney Metropolitan Bus Service Contracts (SMBSC). There are 14 contract regions as of September 2022.

== List of current bus operators in Sydney ==
- Busways

Operates region 1 bus services in the Blacktown, Mount Druitt, Penrith, Windsor, St Marys, Richmond and Rouse Hill areas, as well as services on the North-West T-way. Also operates region 7 bus services on the North Shore and in Northern Sydney.

- CDC NSW

A subsidiary of ComfortDelGro Australia and previously branded as Hillsbus and Forest Coach Lines. Operates region 4 bus services in the Baulkham Hills, Rouse Hill and Blacktown areas as well as services on the North-West T-way, and region 14 services linking the city and Lower & Mid North Shore, Hornsby and the Upper North Shore.

- Keolis Northern Beaches

Operates region 8 bus services on the Northern Beaches and the Lower North Shore. A subsidiary of Keolis Australia.

- Maianbar Bundeena Bus Service

Operates a bus service between Maianbar and Bundeena

- Transdev John Holland

Operates region 9 bus services between the Eastern Suburbs and CBD. A 75/25 joint venture between Transdev and John Holland.

- Transit Systems

Operates regions 2 and 3 bus services in Western Sydney and services on the Liverpool–Parramatta T-way, and region 6 bus services in the Inner West

- U-Go Mobility

Operates region 10 bus services in South Western Sydney and Sutherland Shire. A 50/50 joint venture between UGL (company) and Go-Ahead Group

== List of defunct bus operators in Sydney ==
In the past, many of Sydney's bus services were operated by small companies, particularly in the middle and outer suburbs. Some of these companies only operated one or two routes. Most operated before the current revised route numbers and contract areas were introduced.

Most defunct operators either had their companies acquired, had all their services transferred to other operators, merged to form larger companies, or renamed. A change of ownership without a change of operator name is not considered defunct. Some operators do not operate public routes or services anymore but still operate as charter companies.

=== Currently charter/tour operators ===
These operators, though not operating public routes anymore, still operate charter and/or tour services.

- Australia Wide Coaches

Operates charter services from the Mascot area. Never operated Sydney Bus routes but operates a coach service between Sydney and Orange.

- Baxter's Coaches

Operated bus services in the western suburbs. Granville, Bass Hill services transferred to Veolia Transport NSW and Transit First respectively in January 2005. The rest of the services (Region 3) were sold to Westbus in 2006. Remains a tour and charter company only.

- Alura Coaches

Operated bus services in and around Miranda, Cronulla and Kurnell until services were taken over by Veolia Transport NSW in 2009. Remains a coach charter company.

- Hopkinsons

Operated services in the Parramatta and Merrylands area (Region 3) until 13 October 2013, when routes were transferred to Transit Systems. Remains a tour and charter company.

- Metro-link Bus Lines

Operated feeder buses in Sydney's south west to Liverpool station (Region 3) until 13 October 2013, when routes were transferred to Transit Systems. Remains a coach charter company.

- Moore's Tours

Operated route 954 from a depot in Blakehurst until 2004 when route taken over by Punchbowl Bus Company. Was an associated company of Harris Park Transport until 2004. Remains a charter operator only.

- Murrays

Operated routes 6 and 49 in southern Sydney until they were sold to Brighton Bus Lines in October 1982. Remains and has grown into a large coach charter company.

- Punchbowl Bus Company

Operate bus services in the south and inner south western suburbs, from a depot at Riverwood until July 2023 when operations were transferred to U-Go Mobility. Also operates services in Goulburn as PBC Goulburn.

- Sydney Coachlines

Operated routes 6, 49 and 68. Route 49 taken over by Pioneer Coaches and routes 6 and 68 by Sydney Buses in October 1996. Remains a coach charter company.

=== Renamed or merged operators ===
- Campbelltown Transit Company

Operated services in Campbelltown. Rebranded as Busways in 1988

- Caringbah Bus Service

Operated bus services in Sydney's south. Services sold to Veolia Transport NSW in October 2011. Now a charter company with the name Tiger Tours, was sold to Telford's in June 2015

- Connex Southtrans

Operated bus services in Sydney's south. Later renamed Connex NSW in 2002, then rebranded as Veolia Transport NSW in April 2006.

- Deanes Coaches (South)

Renamed Southtrans in 1989 (later taken over by Connex in 1999). Now operates as Transdev NSW

- Forest Coach Lines

Operated bus services in region 14 Sydney's northern suburbs linking the city and Lower & Mid North Shore until May 2023 when it was rebranded to CDC NSW. A subsidiary of ComfortDelGro Australia since September 2018.

- Glenorie Bus Company

Rebranded as Hillsbus in December 2004, along with Westbus' Hills District routes.

- Hawkesbury Valley Buses

Operated services in north western Sydney (Region 1) until the 6 October 2013 when routes were transferred to Busways. Same ownership as Busabout since the 1990s. Continued as a charter company but ceased 24 April 2017.

- Hillsbus

A subsidiary of ComfortDelGro Australia. Operated region 4 bus services from depots at Dural, Northmead and Seven Hills and runs services in the Baulkham Hills, Rouse Hill and Blacktown areas. Rebranded to CDC NSW in April 2023.

- Katen & Heath

Founded 1956, became Bustrans in 1996.

- Hornsby Bus Group

Operated services in the north shore. Renamed Shorelink in 1988.

- Liverpool Transport Company

Bought by the Calabro family in 1994, then retained this operating name until 2001 when it was merged with the Calabro's neighbouring Busabout operations.

- Macarthur Coaches

Operated services in Macarthur and Camden. Rebranded as Busways in 1988

- Marrickville Bus Lines

Operated route 448 in Marrickville until route was transferred to State Transit in 2004. Now a charter company trading as Telfords Bus & Coach.

- Revesby Bus and Coach Service

Merged into Crossley Bus Lines and renamed in 1996.

- Rowe's Bus Service

Rebranded as Busways in 1988

- Shorelink

Operated services in the north shore. Previously known as Hornsby Bus Group prior to 1998. Renamed TransdevTSL Shorelink in 2008 before reverting to Transdev Shorelink Buses in 2010. Operations absorbed into Transdev NSW in 2014.

- Veolia Transport NSW

Operated bus services in Sydney's south. Rebranded as Transdev NSW in July 2013.

- Westbus (Hills District)

Westbus' Hills District routes rebranded as Hillsbus in December 2004. Other Westbus routes were unaffected by the rebranding.

- Westbus

A subsidiary of ComfortDelGro Australia. Operated services in Western Sydney in region 1 until the 6 October 2013 and region 3 until the 13 October 2013. Westbus was replaced by Busways in region 1 and Transit Systems in region 3. Charter work is now done by CDC Travel.

- Westway Bus and Coach Service

Rebranded as Transit First in 2003

- Woronora Bus Service

Operated services in Woronora. Renamed Menai Bus Service in the 1970s.

=== Other defunct operators ===
- ABC Coach Lines

Operated routes 451–455 until they were handed over to Sydney Buses as caretaker in 1990

- Allways Bus Service

Formerly Allways Lidcombe-Auburn Bus Service. Operated route 455 until it was sold to Pioneer Coaches in May 1992.

- Auburn Coaches

Operated routes 405 and 406 in Auburn. Route 405 sold to Baxter's Bus Lines and 406 to Parramatta-Ryde Bus Service in March 1993. Formerly known as Auburn Bus Service. Was part of Nowra Coaches between August and September 1990, between October 1990 and February 1991, and between February 1993 to March 1993.

- Bankstown–Eldridge Rd Bus Service

Operated route 20 from Bankstown station to Eldridge Road (Bankstown Hospital). Sold to Bass Hill Bus Service in 1977.

- Bankstown-Strathfield Bus Service

Operated routes 484–86 in Bankstown, Greenacre and Strathfield. Under same ownership as West Bankstown Bus Service. Operations of both bus companies taken over by Westway (later renamed Transit First) in 2003

- Barklimore Bros

Operated routes 153 and 214 in Merrylands until taken over by Baxter's Bus Lines in 1981. Routes now operated by Transit Systems.

- Barnes Coaches

Operated routes 54, 124, 221 and 224 until taken over by Deanes Coaches in November 1970.

- Bass Hill Bus Service

Operated routes 20 and 21. Services sold to Baxter's Bus Lines in 1995 and renumbered 930 and 932 soon afterwards.

- Belmore Lakemba Bus Company

Operated route 35 Belmore Lakemba via Roselands Shopping Centre and route 92 Bardwell Park to Roselands 1966 to early 80s their Depot was behind BP service station on Kingsgrove Road at Kingsgrove next to old gas tank (now removed). Believed to have been sold to Pleasure Tours in the early 80s

- Bowden's Bus Service

Operated route 79 from City to Tamarama until taken over by Public Transport Commission in June 1974

- Brighton Bus Lines

Operated route 196 in the Brighton and Kyeemagh areas until 1993 when the route was bought by State Transit, becoming the 479. The company carried an orange livery with a blue stripe.

- Busabout

Operated bus services in the Campbelltown and Camden areas until 8 October 2023 when operations were transferred to Transit Systems NSW. Also operates services in Wagga Wagga as Busabout Wagga Wagga.

- Bustrans

Operated Routes 817 and 818 in the Fairfield area. It was taken over by Baxter's Bus Lines in April 2004 after an accident where Bustrans was found to have defective buses.

- Calabro's

Operated routes around Cabramatta and Fairfield. Taken over by Westbus in 1989.

- Canterbury Bus Lines

Operated routes 450 and 451 until routes taken over by Punchbowl Bus Company in 1998. Part of Highway Tours until 1987, then under Eddie Hayman and Colin Crossley's ownership

- Carss Park Charter Tours and Buslines

Operated routes 958 and 959 until taken over by Southtrans in December 1993

- Challenge Travel

Formerly Bankstown Lakemba Bus Lines and Bankstown Coaches (unrelated to the current coach operator). Also known as Challenge Coach Lines. Operatex routes 26 in Bankstown and 117/118 in Oatley. Route 26 was sold to Revesby Bus & Coach Service in January 1990 while route 117/118 was sold to Oatley Bus Lines in 1988. Remained a coach operator until sold to Hopkinsons.

- Commodore Coaches

Operated routes 46 and 47 in Campsie/Greeenacre before selling them to Newhams Bus Service in August 1989. Operated as tour operator until it was renamed to Compass Tours in 2011.

- Crossley Bus Lines

Revesby Bus and Coach Service merged into Crossley in 1996. Services 915–921 sold to Transit First in 1997. Remaining services sold to Connex Southtrans in 2001.

- Deanes Coaches (North)

Operated services in the North Shore. Services sold to Hornsby Bus Group and East Lindfield-Killara Bus Service in December 1988. All services now operated by Transdev NSW.

- Delwood Coaches

Operated services in Granville. Services sold to Baxter's Bus Lines in 1992.

- Drummond Transit

Operated route 123 from Bankstown to Lidcombe from 1978 until September 1984 when the route was sold to Highway Tours.

- Foley's Bus Service

Operated route 32 between Kogarah and Dolls Point. Route transferred to Peakhurst Bus Company in December 1994. Also had a coach operation called Foley's Scenic Tours.

- GP Bus Company

Later sold to Punchbowl Bus Company in 1955

- Harbour City Coaches

Operated lower North Shore services from 1987 until sold to North & Western Bus Lines in 1989

- Harris Park Transport

An associated company of Moore's Tours. Operated routes 620–630 in Carlingford and Cherrybrook and 74/106 in Hurstville. 620–630 were sold to Westbus and 74/106 to Punchbowl Bus Company in December 2004. The Harris Park depot turned into brownfield land, while the North Rocks depot still has a handful of buses and guard dogs, but is no longer in operation.

- Highway Tours

Operated a number of routes in the south west as Auburn Passenger Transport, Canterbury Bus Lines, or simply Highway Tours until the late 1980s.

- Higlett's Coaches

Acquired by the Rowe family in 1986 and renamed Macarthur Coaches.

- Holsworthy Bus Company

Operated between Holsworthy and Liverpool until 1982.

- Interline Bus Services

Operated bus services out of a depot in Macquarie Fields in the Liverpool and Glenfield area until 8 October 2023 when operations were transferred to Transit Systems NSW.

- Jannali Como Bus Service

Operated route 238 sold 1977 to South Western Coach Lines operated services from Jannali to Como and Oyster Bay. Limited services to Sutherland. Owned and operated Jannali Scenic Tours and Opal Field Scenic Tours

- Kogarah–Carss Park Bus Service (Blythe's)

Also known as EH Blythe. Operated route 121 between Kogarah and Carss Park until taken over by Southtrans in April 1994.

- Lane Cove Bus Service

Bought bus services in the Lane Cove area from Deanes Coaches in the early 1980s until 1987.

- C. A. Leach & Sons

Operated routes 111 and 194 between Hurstville and Kingsgrove from a depot in Cross Street, Hurstville. Transferred to Heron Bus Lines in 1977.

- Longueville Motor Bus Company

Operated services in the Lane Cove/Longueville area until 1969 when taken over by Deanes Coaches.

- Macquarie Towns Coach Lines

Operated services in Windsor. Formed from the merger of Gosper's Bus Service with Duffy's Bus Lines in 1981. Sold to Westbus in 1988.

- Manly Coaches
- McVicar's Bus Services

Operated routes, mainly out of Bankstown until 1978 when operations were sold to various bus companies.

- Menai Bus Service

Formerly known as Woronora Bus Service. Operated services in Menai. Sold to Deanes Coaches in 1988. Services now operated by Transdev NSW.

- Midshore Busways

Routes taken over by Shorelink

- Milperra Bus Service

Operated routes around Bankstown until 1987, when taken over by Westway (later renamed Transit First).

- Narwee Bus Service

Taken over by Punchbowl Bus Company in the late 1950s

- North & Western Bus Lines

Operated routes in the Ryde area. Sold to Sydney Buses in 1999.

- Parramatta-Ryde Bus Service

Also known as Riverside Bus & Coach Service. Operated routes 333, 406, 540 and 555 in the Parramatta area until it was sold to Sydney Buses in 2000.

- Parramatta Villawood Bus Service

Operated route 97 and 186. Sold to Delwood Coaches in 1978.

- Peakhurst Bus Company (Saints)

Operated three routes (88 and 108) in southern Sydney until 1989 when the routes were taken over by the Punchbowl Bus Company. Operated route 947 in southern Sydney until 1998 when the route was split and sold to Southtrans and Punchbowl Bus. The buses carried a black and white livery.

- Pioneer Coaches

Operated routes 452 (formerly 112), 453 and 455 until 2001 when operations were acquired by Connex Southtrans. The company carried a red and blue livery.

- Pleasure Tours

Operated routes 446 and 447 until 2005 when routes taken over by Punchbowl Bus Company.

- Premier Coaches

Formerly Challenge Travel and Oatley Bus Service. Operated routes 117/118 (some trips operated by Moore's Tours) until taken over by Moore's Tours in December 1999.

- Red Top Bus Company

Routes 34 and 39 Strathfield to Hurstville via Roselands Shopping Centre and Campsie, Hurstville via Roselands

- Richmond Coaches

Routes absorbed by Westbus

- South Sydney Bus Company

Operated services from Central Railway to Maroubra Junction and Brighton-Le-Sands in the 1920s and 1930s.

- South Western Coach Lines (Holman family)

Renamed from Hurstville Bus Lines, Kareela Bus Lines and Bankstown Bus Lines. Operated a number of routes in southern Sydney as well as the inner west until the late 1980s. All former South Western services in southern Sydney now operated by Transdev NSW.

- Southtrans

Taken over by Connex in the September 1999, then renamed Connex Southtrans. Now operates as Transdev NSW.

- St Ives Bus Service

Operated until 1998 when its operations were split between Forest Coach Lines and Shorelink (now Transdev NSW).

- State Transit

Government operator, a subsidiary of Transport for NSW. Operated bus services in the Northern Suburbs, City and Eastern Suburbs until they were tendered off to private operates between October 2021 and April 2022

- Toongabbie Buses

Formerly Toongabbie Transport Services. Operated services in Toongabbie and Wentworthville. Routes 700 and 705 taken over from Western Road Bus Service in January 1987. Route 715 transferred to Westbus on the same day, followed by the rest of the routes (including 700 and 705) in December 1988.

- Transdev NSW

Operated bus services in Sydney's southern suburbs, Hornsby area and the Upper North Shore until 2023, when operations were passed to CDC NSW, Transit Systems and U-Go Mobility.

- Transit First

Operated services in South West Sydney (Region 13). Operations bought by Veolia Transport in 2007.

- West Bankstown Bus Service

Operated routes 935, 936 and 937 in Bankstown, Yagoona and Georges Hall. Same ownership as Bankstown–Strathfield Bus Service. Operations of both bus companies taken over by Westway (later renamed Transit First) in 2003.

- Western Road Bus Service

Operated routes 700, 702, 703, 705 and 810 in Wentworthville. 700 and 705 taken over by Toongabbie Buses, while 810 was taken over by Baxter's Bus Lines in January 1987. Routes 702 and 703 discontinued and replaced by other Baxter's routes.
