= Leyland Super Viking =

Overview
- Manufacturer: Leyland
- Production: 1980-1984

Body and chassis
- Doors: 1-2
- Floor type: Step entrance

Powertrain
- Engine: Leyland 0.401

Chronology
- Predecessor: Albion Viking VK

The Leyland Super Viking was a bus chassis manufactured by Leyland between 1980 and 1984.

== History ==
Following the closure of Albion's Scotstoun plant in October 1980, production of the Albion Viking VK was transferred to Leyland with the chassis relaunched as the Leyland Super Viking. Production ceased in 1984.

== Australian Operators ==
The Leyland Super Viking was purchased by a number of Sydney operators in the 1980s including Bowman's Bus Lines, Busways, Delwood Coaches, Hadfield's Bus Lines, Interline Bus Services, Liverpool Transport Company, North & Western Bus Lines and Westway. A fleet of 10 Super Vikings was purchased by Sunshine Coast, Queensland operator Tewantin Bus Service.

The last Super Viking did not enter service until 1995. The chassis was purchased by Bass Hill Bus Service of Sydney and bodied by Pressed Metal Corporation in 1984. However Bass Hill never placed it in service and it wasn't until the business was sold to Baxter's Bus Lines in 1995, that it entered service.
