= Highway Tours =

- Parent: Jim Hill
- Commenced operation: 31 August 1983
- Ceased operation: November 1988
- Headquarters: Revesby
- Service area: South-western Sydney
- Service type: Bus operator
- Hubs: Auburn station Bankstown station Roselands Shopping Centre
- Depots: 3
- Operator: Auburn Passenger Transport; Canterbury Bus Lines; Highway Tours

Highway Tours was an Australian bus company operating services in the south-western suburbs of Sydney, New South Wales.

== History ==
Highway Tours was formed on 31 August 1983 when Jim Hill purchased four routes from Cumberland Coaches trading as Canterbury Bus Lines from a depot in Enfield:

- 34: Strathfield – Hurstville via Roselands Shopping Centre
- 35: Belmore – Lakemba via Roselands Shopping Centre
- 39: Campsie – Hurstville via Roselands Shopping Centre
- 92: Bardwell Park – Roselands Shopping Centre

On 22 February 1984, a further six routes were purchased from Cumberland Coaches, trading as Auburn Passenger Transport from a depot in Regents Park:

- 5: Auburn – Guildford
- 13: Auburn – Regents Park
- 14: Auburn – Cumberland Road
- 116: Auburn – Berala
- 149: Auburn – Chisholm Road
- 239: Auburn – Blaxcell Street

These were reorganised as routes 916-919 in July 1985.

In May 1984, routes 68 Hurstville – Earlwood and 229 Kogarah – Roselands Shopping Centre were purchased from EH Blythe and operated under the Bexley Passenger Transport name, these were later operated under the Canterbury Bus Lines brand.

On 1 July 1984, routes 46 Campsie – North Belmore and 47 Lakemba – Greenacre were purchased from Ed Hayman's Greenacre Bus Service. These were sold in October 1985 to RP Gallagher, but returned to Highway by the end of 1986, before being sold again on 1 July 1988 to Commodore Coaches.

In September 1984, route 123 Lidcombe to Bankstown via Regents Park was purchased from Drummond Transit and in the same month, route 6 Arncliffe – Earlwood from Tough's Bus Service (partnership between John Brown and Challenge Travel owner Bob Stephens). The latter was sold to Sydney Coachlines in April 1985, while the former was replaced by 917 in July 1985.

On 6 March 1985, eight routes were purchased from South Western Coach Lines with a depot in Revesby:

- 125: Lidcombe – Bankstown via Lidcombe Hospital
- 922: Bankstown – East Hills via Milperra
- 923: Bankstown – Picnic Point via Revesby and Panania
- 924: Bankstown – Picnic Point via Revesby, Panania and East Hills
- 925: Revesby Heights – Milperra Bridge
- 926: Bankstown – Revesby Heights
- 927: Bankstown – One Tree Point
- 928: East Hills – Roselands Shopping Centre

On 31 July 1985, route 125 was renumbered 920 and moved to Auburn Passenger Transport. On 19 December 1985, routes 26 Bankstown – Lakemba via Punchbowl and 176 Bankstown – Punchbowl were purchased from Bankstown Coaches. Route 176 ceased immediately and was replaced by route 26, which was sold back to Bob Stephens in February 1986, operating as Challenge Travel (Challenge Coaches). Bob Stephens previously operated route 26 between 1976 and 1984.

In July 1986, route 39 was sold to Greenacre Bus Service (RP Gallagher) before it was sold back to Highway Tours at the end of the year. In 1987, the Auburn Passenger Transport subsidiary (routes 916–921) was sold to Colin Crossley, and the Canterbury Bus Lines subsidiary to Crossley and Ed Hayman with route 34, after routes 35 and 92 were sold in September 1986 to Pleasure Tours. On 14 October 1987, route 68 was sold to Sydney Coachlines. Route 39 was sold to Crossley/Hayman owned Canterbury Bus Lines in March 1988.

In November 1988, the remaining operations (routes 922–928) were sold to Colin Crossley trading as Revesby Bus & Coach Service. From 1996, both Crossley-owned operations operated as Crossley Bus Lines.

== After cessation ==
In October 1996, routes 6 and 68 passed to Sydney Buses' Kingsgrove depot, and were renumbered as 471 and 499 respectively. In April 1998, the Canterbury Bus Lines operation was sold to Punchbowl Bus Company, who would also purchase the Pleasure Tours routes in July 2005. Through a series of transactions, the rest of the former Highway Tours business was reunited between 2001 and 2007, and is now operated by Transdev NSW.

== Fleet ==
Highway Tours inherited a fleet composed predominantly of AECs, Bedfords and Leylands. During its tenure, no new buses were purchased with most additions to the fleet being ex Urban Transit Authority Leyland Leopards. Fleet livery was orange and white.
