= Sydney Buses =

Sydney Buses could refer to

- a previously used name for a subsidiary of the State Transit Authority providing bus services in parts of Sydney
- general information on bus services in Sydney
- general information on bus operators in Sydney
