= Tiger Tours =

- Parent: Kinetic Group
- Commenced operation: 1942
- Headquarters: Taren Point
- Service area: Sutherland Shire
- Service type: Coach charter services
- Alliance: Telford's Bus & Coach
- Depots: 1
- Fleet: 11 (October 2014)
- Website: www.tigercoachtours.com.au

Tiger Tours was an Australian coach charter company in Sydney. Until October 2011, Tiger Tours was known as Caringbah Bus Service, and operated route bus services in Sydney Bus Region 11, in Sutherland Shire.

== History ==
The company started in 1942, when Keith Wood bought route 50, which operated between Caringbah and Miranda with diversions to Taren Point as well. The Taren Point diversion was sold to Sutherland Bus Service in May 1955. The name Caringbah Bus Service was introduced later that year.

In 1992, the company bought a portion of South Western Coach Lines' route 114 (Miranda – Caringbah) and merged it with its route 50. In 1993, route 50 was reorganised as:

- 977: Miranda – Caringbah – Lilli Pilli via Willarong Road and Crescent Road
- 978: Miranda – Caringbah – Port Hacking via Gannons Point and Dolans Bay

These services operated from Miranda to Port Hacking, Dolans Bay and Lilli Pilli via Caringbah station, and school services in the area. In 2009 they were changed so that route 977 no longer operated via Willarong Road and Crescent Road but operated direct via Port Hacking Road. Willarong Road and Crescent Road were then covered by route 978.

When the Sydney Metropolitan Bus System Contracts were established in 2005, the operation area of Caringbah Bus Service belonged to part of region 11, which was shared with Crowthers and Maianbar Bundeena Bus Service. Crowthers was sold to Veolia Transport NSW in 2009. When Crowthers' routes were sold to adjoining region 10 operator Veolia Transport NSW on 21 September 2009, region 11 was merged into region 10.

In October 2011, the route bus services of 977 and 978 were also sold to Veolia with nine buses.

Caringbah Bus Service had long operated a coach charter business under the Tiger Tours banner and this business continued with 11 vehicles. On 1 May 2015, the business was purchased by Dunn Motor Traction and has since been fully merged into the Telford Tours operation. In November 2019 the business was included in the sale to the Kinetic Group.
