= Parramatta-Ryde Bus Service =

Former Australian bus company

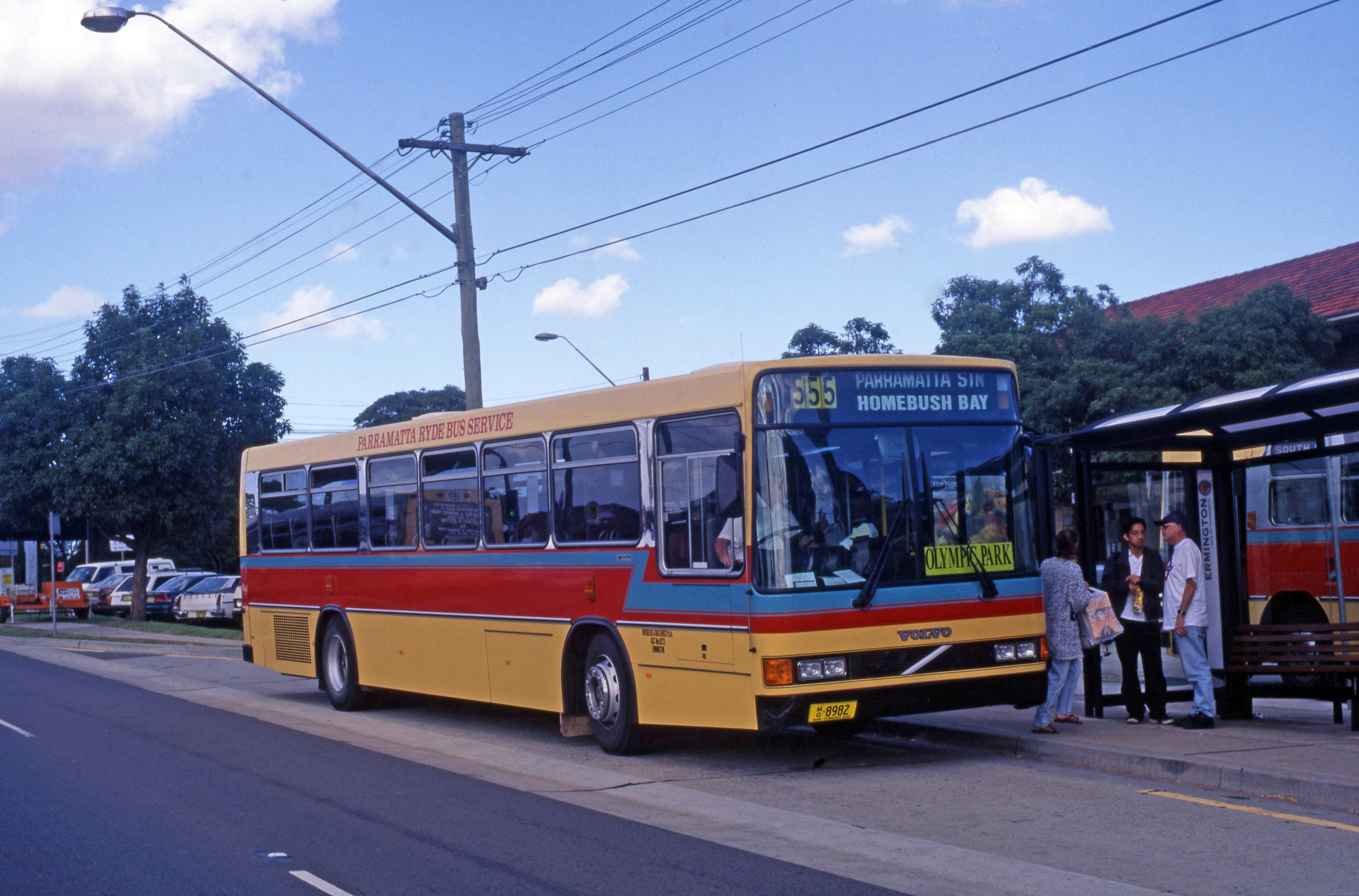
- A Volvo B10B bus in April 2000 bearing the Parramatta-Ryde Bus Service livery, shortly after its sale to State Transit
- Parent: Ken Butt; Ferris family
- Commenced operation: 1896
- Ceased operation: 28 February 2000
- Headquarters: Ermington
- Service area: Northern & Western Sydney
- Service type: Bus services
- Alliance: North & Western Bus Lines
- Routes: 4
- Depots: 1
- Fleet: 26 (February 2000)

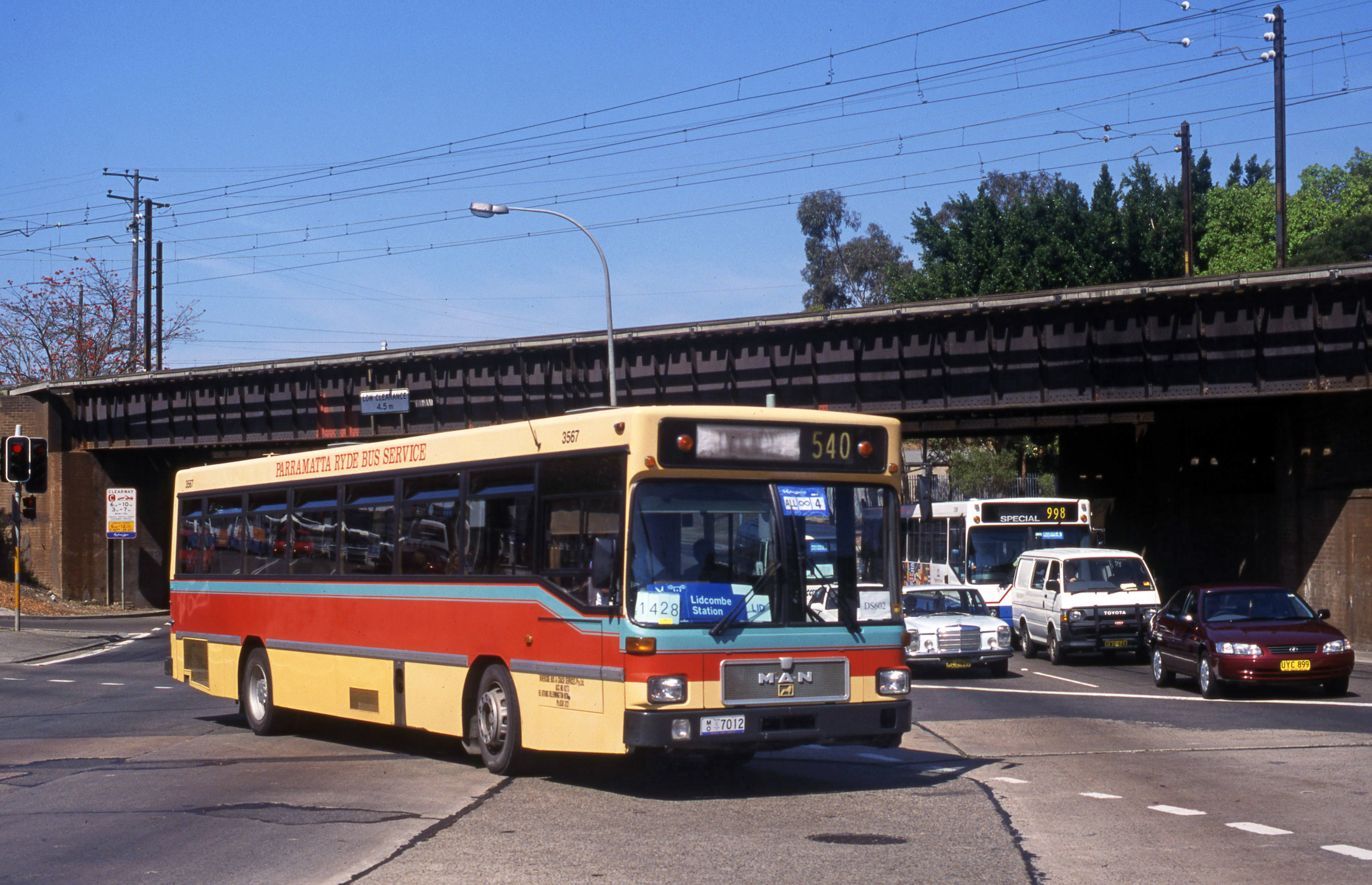
A MAN SL202 bus bearing the Parramatta-Ryde Bus Service livery in September 2000, after its sale to State Transit

Parramatta-Ryde Bus Service was an Australian bus company operating route bus services and charter coaches in Sydney.

== History ==
The origins of Parramatta-Ryde Bus Service can be traced back to 1896 when Alf Wigzell commenced a horse-drawn omnibus service along Victoria Road between Ryde station and Ermington. In 1915, the route was sold to Mr Howell and the first motor bus introduced. Howell sold out to William Henry, who in turn sold out to RB Staunton. In 1925 the route was allocated number 173.

On 27 April 1927, the business was purchased by Bill Phillips. By this stage route 173 had been extended to Parramatta station. After Phillips died in 1949, the business was taken over by his son Bill. In June 1950, the business was incorporated as Parramatta-Ryde Bus Service with Phillips and his wife being the major shareholders with managers Des Kennedy and Ivan Ferris each having smaller shareholdings. The Parramatta-Ryde Bus Service trading name was adopted in the 1950s, with the charter operation becoming Trailer Tours.

In August 1950, the Department of Motor Transport asked Phillips to take over the operation of routes 98 and 105 from Granville station to South Granville and Sefton station. In August 1958, both were sold to Delwood Coaches.

On 10 November 1962 with the opening of the Silverwater Bridge, Parramatta-Ryde began operating a service from Parramatta station via Silverwater Road to Auburn. With Willcox Bus Service extending its Silverwater routes across the bridge to Ermington, both found their routes unprofitable, and in January 1963 agreed to retreat to their respective sides of the Parramatta River. In February 1976, Phillips retired and Kennedy and Ferris took over the business.

On 19 January 1981, Parramatta Ryde Bus Service and North & Western Bus Lines commenced operating Red Arrow route 333 from Parramatta station to Chatswood station. From 1990, the route was solely operated by Parramatta Ryde Bus Service.

On 8 March 1993, route 406 Auburn station to Ermington was purchased from Auburn Coaches. On 1 June 1993, Kennedy sold his share in the business to North & Western Bus Lines proprietor Ken Butt. On 20 April 1998, route 555 commenced operating from Parramatta station to Sydney Olympic Park on behalf of the Olympic Roads & Transport Authority. On 13 December 1999, Butt's share in the business was included in the sale of North & Western Bus Lines to the State Transit Authority. On 28 February 2000, Ivan Ferris also sold his share to the State Transit Authority with the operation incorporated into its Ryde depot.

== Routes ==
The routes at the time the business was sold were:

- 333: Parramatta station – Chatswood station
- 406: Auburn station – Ermington
- 540: Parramatta station – West Ryde station
- 555: Parramatta station – Sydney Olympic Park

Routes 333, 406 and 540 were replaced by new State Transit routes during bus network restructures in 2000 and 2001. Route 555 was replaced mainly by route 525 in December 2002.

== Fleet ==
From the mid-1940s, Parramatta-Ryde operated a fleet of trailer buses. This gave lend to the Trailer Tours name that was used for its charter operations. Until 1987, Parramatta-Ryde built its own bodies on Whites, AEC Reliances, Leyland Leopards and MAN SL200s. Parramatta-Ryde Bus Service operated 23 buses and three coaches at the time of its sale.
