= Albion Viking =

Bus chassis manufactured by Albion between 1963 and 1980

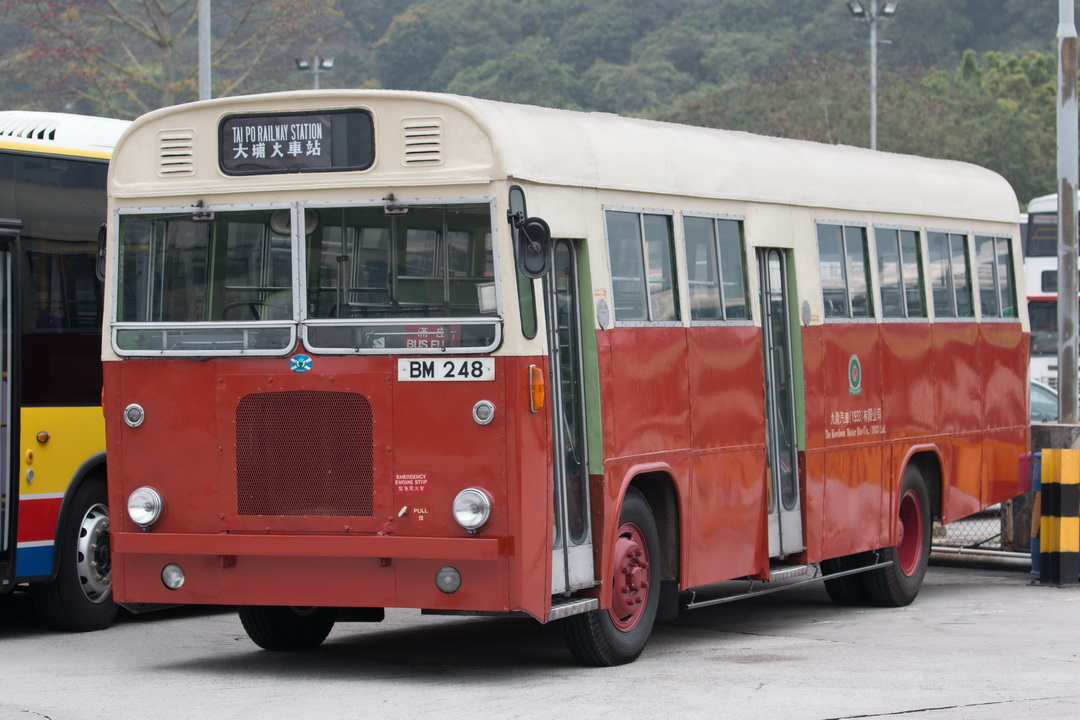

Overview
- Manufacturer: Albion
- Production: 1963-80

Body and chassis
- Doors: 1-2
- Floor type: Step entrance

Powertrain
- Engine: Leyland 0.370; Leyland 0.400; Leyland 0.401

Chronology
- Predecessor: Albion Victor VT
- Successor: Leyland Super Viking

The Albion Viking was a bus chassis manufactured by Albion between 1963 and 1980.

== History ==
The Albion Viking VK41 was launched in 1963 as a front engined replacement for the Albion Victor VT. In 1965, the rear engined Viking VK43 was introduced. Later the VK49, VK55 and VK57 versions were released.

Following the closure of Albion's Scotstoun plant in October 1980, production was transferred to Leyland with the chassis relaunched as the Leyland Super Viking. Production ceased in 1984.

== Operators ==
Although some were sold in the United Kingdom, notably to the Scottish Bus Group, the majority were sold overseas including to Barbados and Kowloon Motor Bus in Hong Kong, Fok Lei (now Transmac) in Macau, and SBS in Singapore. The Albion Viking was bought in numbers in Australia and was even used in the 1965 Freedom rides. In the 1960s, it was popular with operators of Safari Tours.
