= CA Leach & Sons =

Bus operator in Sydney, Australia

- Parent: Cecil Aubrey Leach
- Commenced operation: 1948
- Ceased operation: 1974
- Headquarters: Hurstville
- Service area: St George
- Routes: 2
- Depots: 1

CA Leach & Sons was an Australian bus operator that operated services between Hurstville and Kingsgrove in Sydney from 1948 until 1974.

== History ==
In October 1946, bus Route 111 from Ramsgate to Kingsgrove via Hurstville was transferred from HT Saint to Cliff Mallam and Cec Leach. In November 1948, Leach became the sole owner with the business trading as CA Leach & Sons. In the same month, Leach commenced an alternative route from Hurstville to Kingsgrove, via Hodge Street, operating as Route 194.

In May 1952, the section of route 111 between Ramsgate and Hurstville was transferred back to HT Saint and incorporated into the existing route 113. The remainder of route 111, between Hurstville and Kingsgrove, continued to operate as an alternative to route 194.

A 1962 timetable provides detail of the route and running times for each of the two routes operated by Leach & Sons.

In November 1974, following the death of Leach, the routes were transferred to Heron Bus Lines, owned by Ken Bradley.

Ownership subsequently passed through Cumberland Bus Company and Allways Bus Service until, in November 1991, routes 111 and 194 were incorporated into a new route 455 that was purchased by Pioneer Coaches in May 1992.

== Depot ==
CA Leach & Sons operated from a depot in Cross Street, Hurstville.
