= South Western Coach Lines =

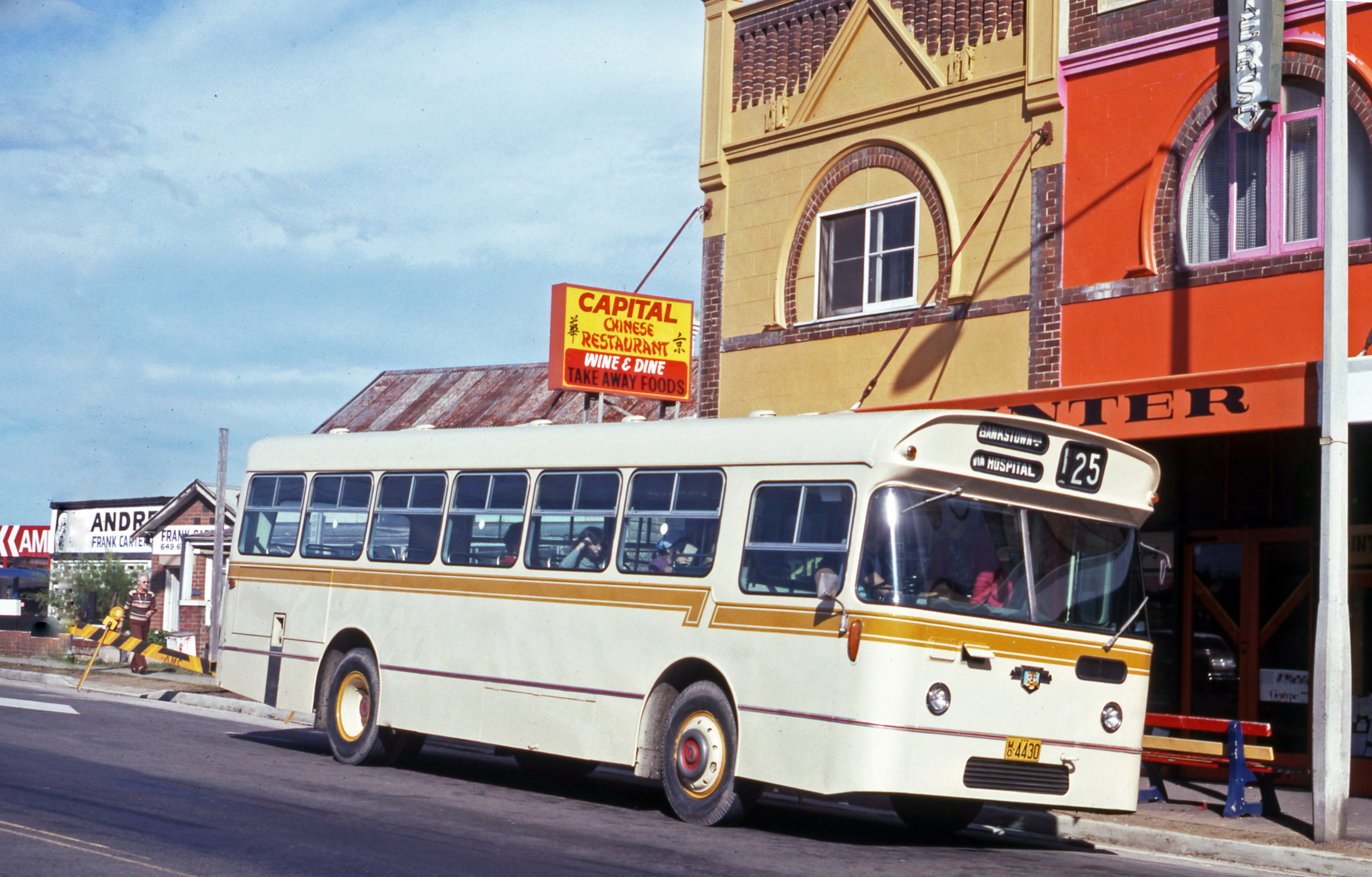
- Freighter bodied Leyland Tiger Cub at Lidcombe, June 1981
- Parent: Max Holman
- Commenced operation: May 1976
- Ceased operation: October 1990
- Service area: Eastern Suburbs; Inner West; South West; Sutherland Shire
- Service type: Bus operator

South Western Coach Lines was an Australian bus company operating services in the Eastern Suburbs, Inner West, South West and Sutherland Shire regions of Sydney.

== Background ==
In the late 1950s, Max Holman operated Seven Hills Bus Lines with WA Wilmot. The company had two routes, one of which was sold to Wilmot in February 1961 and the other one to Seven Hills Bus Company in October 1962. Holman also operated coaches on the Gold Coast in the 1960s, before owning Marrickville Bus Lines and Matraville Bus Service in Sydney in the mid-1970s.

== History ==
In May 1976, Holman purchased route 114 from Kogarah Bus Service and traded as Hurstville Bus Lines. In April 1977, he purchased Jannali-Como Bus Service and renamed it Kareela Bus Lines.

On 25 March 1978, Holman purchased seven routes operating from Bankstown and Lidcombe stations from McVicar's Bus Services initially trading as Bankstown Bus Lines. In October 1979, Holman renamed his three businesses to South Western Coach Lines. On 26 May 1980, Max Holman purchased the routes of Power Bus Service in the Sutherland Shire. In October 1982, the business of Lowe's Bus Service, Alexandria was purchased. Route 10 was purchased from Tregill's Bus Service in early 1984 and was later through-routed with route 19.

On 27 February 1984, the Bankstown to Milperra Bridge section of route 12 was transferred to Milperra Bus Service and combined with their route 69 to form Red Arrow 860 (now M90). On 6 March 1985, the Bankstown and Lidcombe routes were sold to Highway Tours. The Sutherland Shire routes passed to Holman's son Michael in 1985. In February 1986 the Alexandria-based routes were sold to ABC Coach Lines.

South Western Coach Lines ceased trading in October 1990, with the operations of its remaining three routes delicensed and passing to Southtrans on an interim basis. Two of the routes, 9 and 238, were officially transferred to Southtrans in January 1992. At the same time, the last route 114 was split into three parts and sold to Southtrans, Caringbah Bus Service and Carss Park Charter Tours respectively.

=== Former routes ===
==== Eastern Suburbs and Inner West ====
These routes were sold to ABC Coach Lines in February 1986:

- 10 Erskineville – Camperdown via Newtown
- 18 Newtown – Bondi Junction station via Alexandria
- 19 Newtown – Waterloo

==== South Western Sydney ====
These routes were sold to Highway Tours in March 1985:

- 125 Lidcombe – Bankstown via Lidcombe Hospital
- 922 Bankstown – East Hills via Milperra
- 923 Bankstown – Picnic Point via Revesby and Panania
- 924 Bankstown – Picnic Point via Revesby, Panania and East Hills
- 925 Revesby Heights – Milperra Bridge
- 926 Bankstown – Revesby Heights
- 927 Bankstown – One Tree Point
- 928 East Hills – Roselands Shopping Centre

==== Sutherland Shire and Hurstville ====
These routes were operated by South Western prior to its cessation in 1990:

- 9 Sutherland – Gray's Point
- 114 Hurstville – Caringbah via Sylvania and Miranda (including diversions to Bald Face)
- 238 Jannali – Como

Route 114 was split into three parts when it was sold in 1992:

- Hurstville – Sylvania – Miranda (sold to Southtrans and renumbered 970–972 in October 1992)
- Miranda – Caringbah (sold to Caringbah Bus Service and merged with its route 50)
- Hurstville – Bald Face (sold to Carss Park Charter Tours and later renumbered 959)

== After cessation ==
ABC Coach Lines merged 19 with route 10 in February 1987 to form route 10 (Redfern to Camperdown), before being reorganised as routes 453 and 454 in November 1987. Route 18 was renumbered 455. After ABC's cessation, routes 453–455 were operated by Marrickville Bus Lines and Arrow Coaches before passing to Sydney Buses' Waverley depot in June 1990. Route 455 now operates as route 355.

The routes sold to Highway Tours, Southtrans, Caringbah Bus Service and Carss Park Charter Tours were brought under common ownership and today are operated by Transdev NSW.

== VIP Express ==
In the 1980s, Holman operated an interstate express coach business trading as VIP Express with a fleet of 40 coaches. This was sold in February 1987.

== Fleet ==
South Western Coach Lines operated a fleet composed predominantly of AECs, Bedfords and Leylands, many being purchased from government operators ACTION, State Transport Authority and Transperth. Fleet livery was cream and brown.

== Depots ==
South Western Coach Lines operated depots in Alexandria, Jannali and Revesby.
