= Alura Coaches =

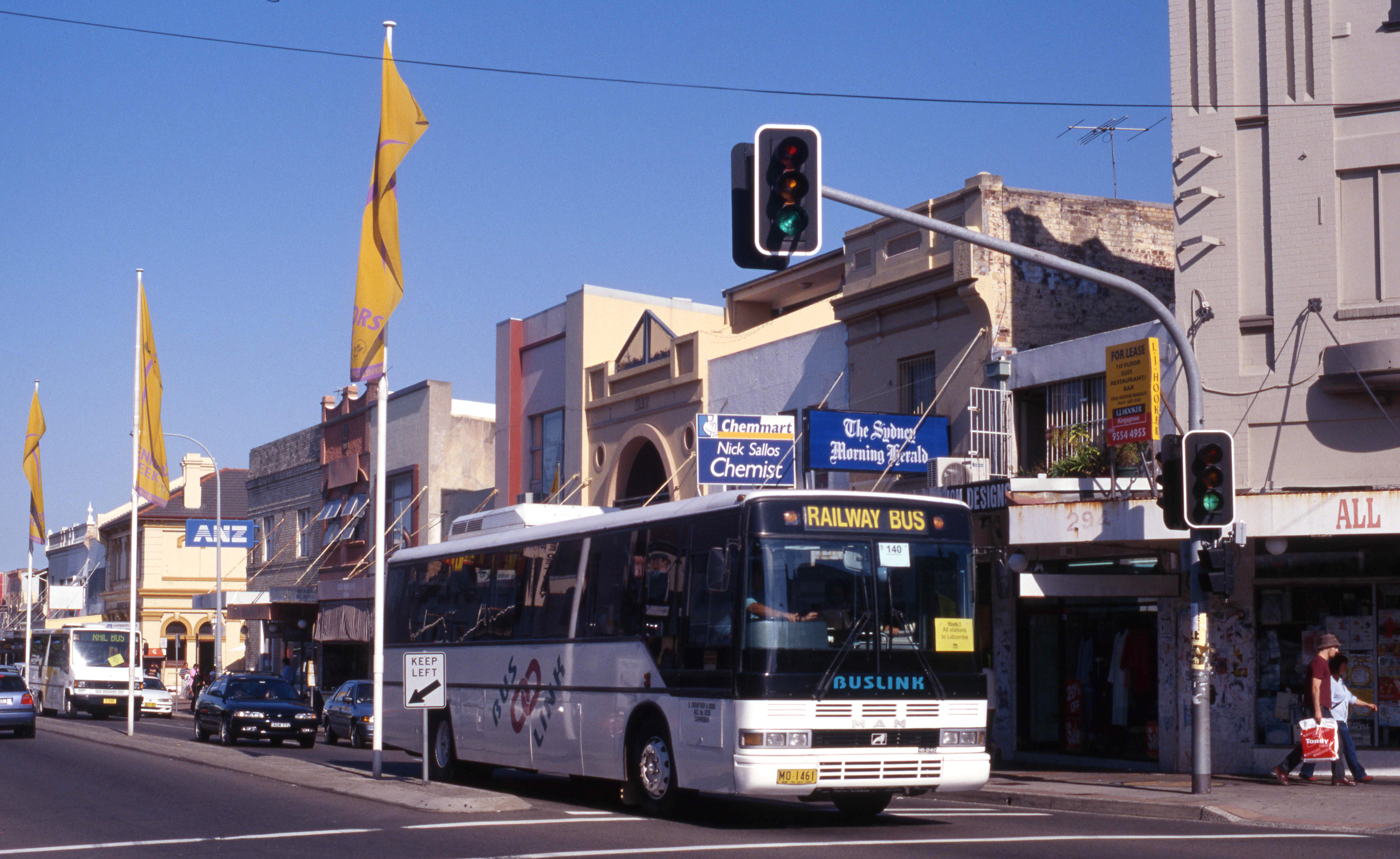
- Pressed Metal Corporation bodied MAN 16.240 in April 2002
- Parent: Barry & Paul Crowther
- Commenced operation: 1916
- Headquarters: Turrella
- Service type: Coach charter services
- Depots: 1
- Fleet: 5 (September 2026)
- Website: www.crowtherscoaches.com.au

Former Crowthers logo

Alura Coaches, formerly Crowthers. is an Australian coach charter coach company in Sydney. Until January 2009, it operated route bus services in the Sutherland Shire.

== History ==
In 1926, S Crowthers and Sons Pty Ltd established a small bus service in Thirroul eventually expanding further south to Dapto. In July 1952 Crowthers began operations in Sydney purchasing route 65 that operated between Cronulla railway station and South Cronulla from Ryder & Moore. In 1966 the service was extended to Caringbah.

In 1998, Barry and Paul Crowther purchased the company from their family.

For the 2000 Olympic Games Crowthers were contracted to manage a fleet of 126 buses and over 200 drivers Olympic sponsors.

When the Sydney Metropolitan Bus System Contracts were established in 2005, the operation area of Crowthers Bus Service belonged to part of region 11, which was shared with Maianbar Bundeena Bus Service and Tiger Tours.

In January 2009 Veolia Transport purchased the route bus operations of Crowthers with six buses.

Crowthers had also operated coaches since at least June 1981 when a new Domino Tourmaster was purchased. From 2005 until 2012, two coaches were painted in Australian Pacific Tours livery with Crowthers acting as a sub-contractor to the tourism company. In September 2023, Crowthers was rebranded Alura Coaches.

== BusLink ==
With the introduction of the Passenger Transport Act of 1990, there was a consolidation of routes. Both Crowther's routes 65 and 66 and Nicholson's route 67 Cronulla to Kurnell were covered by one contract, leading to the operators combining their services under the BusLink brand in November 1992.

The routes were restructured with 984 and 985 operated by Crowthers and 987 by Nicholsons:

In May 2000, Crowthers took over the operation of Nicholson's service.

Crowthers also operated the Shire Shuttle, a Sutherland Shire Council sponsored late-night/early morning service providing free transport from major pubs and clubs. Crowthers also ran a service called the Sharks Shuttle which provided a free service to Endeavour Field from Heathcote, Engadine and Sutherland during Cronulla Sharks home games.
