= Delwood Coaches =

Australian bus company

- Parent: Jim Newport
- Commenced operation: June 1958
- Ceased operation: April 1992
- Headquarters: Villawood
- Service area: Western Sydney
- Service type: Bus services
- Hubs: Granville station
- Depots: 1
- Fleet: 32 (April 1992)

Delwood Coaches was an Australian bus company operating services in Granville, Western Sydney.

== History ==
Delwood Coaches was founded as Delwood Bus Company in 1958 by Jim Newport and Carl Tattam. Newport later bought Tattam's share. In June 1958, the company purchased two routes from Trailer Tours, which was the tour and charter company of Parramatta-Ryde Bus Service.

Jim Newport, in partnership with Roger Graham and Dick Rowe, also operated Campbelltown Transit. By 1970, Rowe had taken full ownership of Campbelltown Transit.

Delwood Bus Company acquired a number of bus companies in the 1970s. The first were Granville Bus Company and Lidcombe Bus Company from Webb Bros in 1970/71. Route 59 of Lidcombe Bus Company was eventually sold to Drummond Transit in July 1974. The next was Parramatta-Villawood Bus Service from Fred Bowman and Dick Rowe in January 1978. This excluded route 97 which was discontinued. These companies later operated as Delwood Coaches.

In February 1980, Bankstown-Parramatta Bus Lines, a joint venture between Delwood Bus Company and Chester Hill-Bankstown Bus Service, commenced operation of Red Arrow route 320. The Chester Hill-Bankstown share was passed to Auburn Bus Service in 1986.

In July 1987, Delwood Coaches renumbered their routes to the Sydney Region Route Number System:

- 902: Parramatta station to Villawood via Granville
- 903: Parramatta station to South Granville via Granville
- 904: Granville station to South Granville
- 905: Granville station to South Granville
- 910: Parramatta station to Bankstown station via Granville (jointly operated with Auburn Bus Service)

In May 1990, Delwood Coaches commenced an unnumbered service between Parramatta to Sydney Airport via Bankstown. In July 1990, Auburn Bus Service sold its share of 910 to Delwood, leaving Delwood Coaches as the sole operator of the route.

In April 1992, Delwood Coaches sold out to Baxter's Bus Lines, with 32 buses and the Villawood depot. The Parramatta to Sydney Airport service was discontinued by Baxter's. The Villawood depot continued to be used by Baxter's until 2005, then Connex NSW (later Veolia) until 2012 when the new Veolia depot in Granville was completed.

== Fleet ==
Delwood Coaches operated a fleet of 32 buses as of April 1992, all of which were sold to Baxter's Bus Lines. It had a white and dark blue livery.
