= Sydney Coachlines =

Australian bus charter company

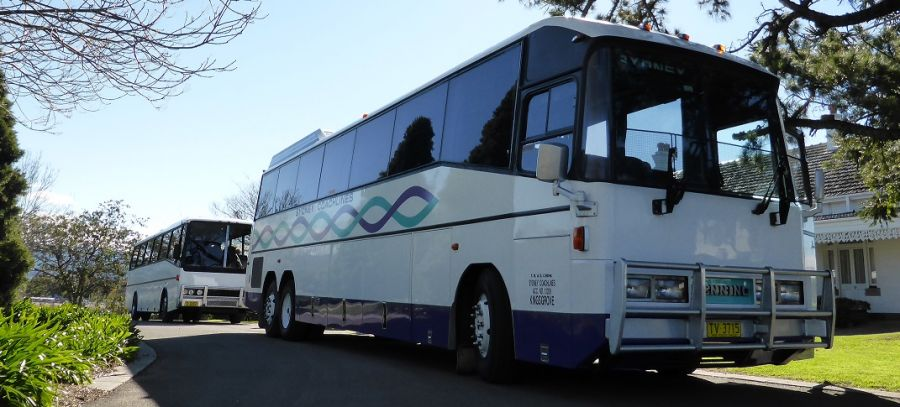
- Parent: Thomas "Dick" Crow
- Commenced operation: 27 March 1982
- Headquarters: Kingsgrove
- Service area: Sydney
- Service type: Bus & coach charter operator
- Depots: 1
- Fleet: 13 (January 2017)
- Website: www.sydneycoachlinestravelkings.com.au

Sydney Coachlines is an Australian bus charter company in Sydney.

== History ==
On 27 March 1983, Thomas "Dick" Crow trading as Sydney Coachlines took over route 49 Rockdale – Carlton from John Brown and Bob Stevens. In April 1985, route 6 Arncliffe – Earlwood was purchased from Highway Tours and by December 1985, had been extended from Arncliffe to Rockdale to become Rockdale – Arncliffe – Earlwood. On 14 October 1987, route 68 Hurstville – Earlwood was purchased from Canterbury Bus Lines.

Sydney Coachlines also commenced a coach charter business, initially operating ex Ansett Pioneer RFWs. On 14 October 1996, the three routes were sold to Sydney Buses. Route 6 was amalgamated with parts of route 472 to become route 471, while route 68 was renumbered 499. Route 49 passed to Pioneer Coaches.

== Fleet ==
As at September 2014, the fleet consisted of nine buses and three coaches. The original fleet livery was two-tone green, later being replaced by a white, purple and aqua scheme.

== Depots ==
Sydney Coachlines initially operated out of a shared depot in Bexley, before relocating to Kingsgrove in 1993.
