= Transit First =

Australian bus company

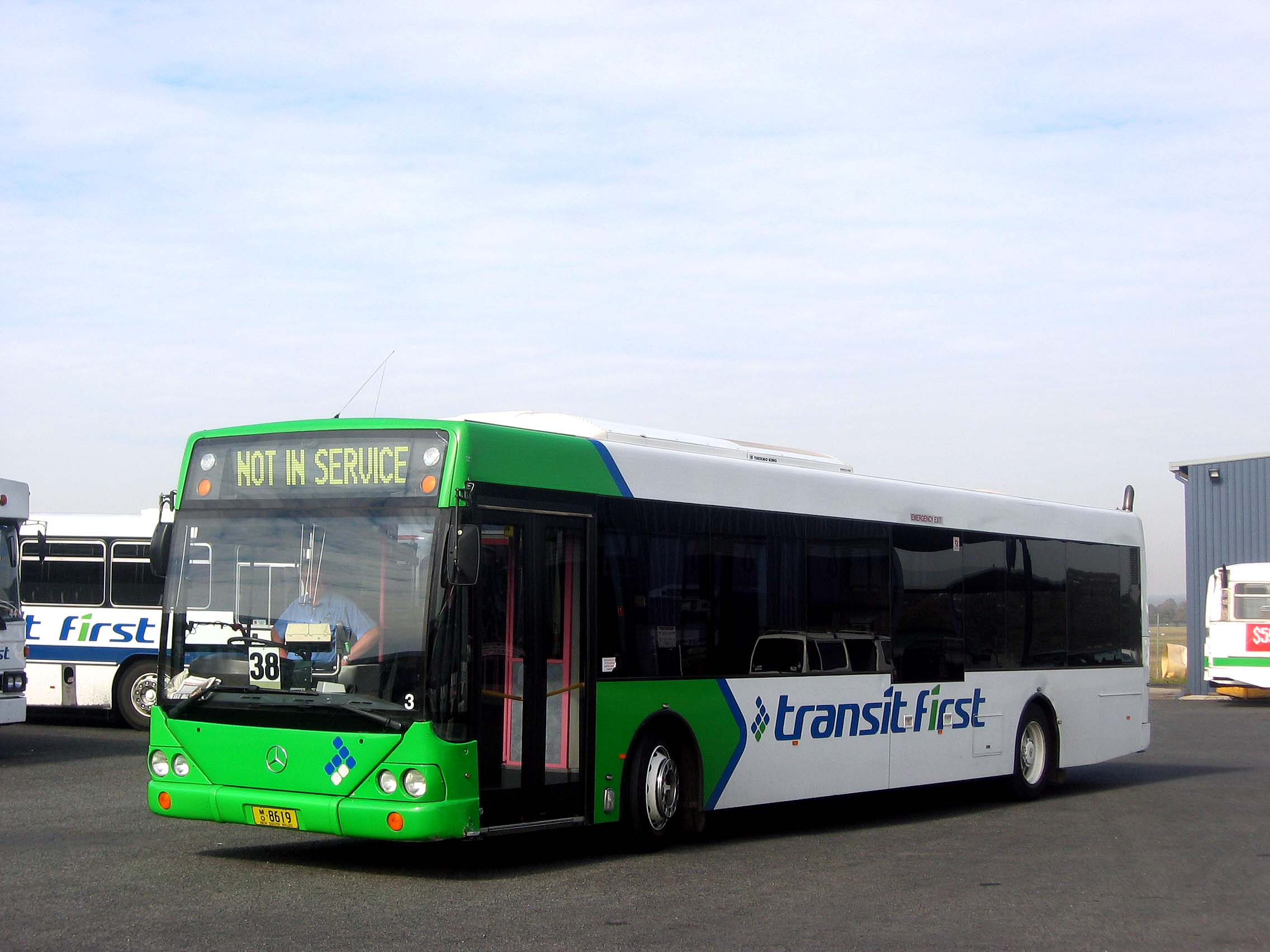
- Custom Coaches bodied Mercedes O405NH at Transit First's Bankstown Airport bus depot in August 2005
- Parent: Peter Threlkeld
- Commenced operation: August 1982
- Ceased operation: February 2007
- Headquarters: Bankstown Airport
- Service type: Bus services
- Depots: 1
- Fleet: 86 (February 2007)
- Website: www.transitfirst.com.au

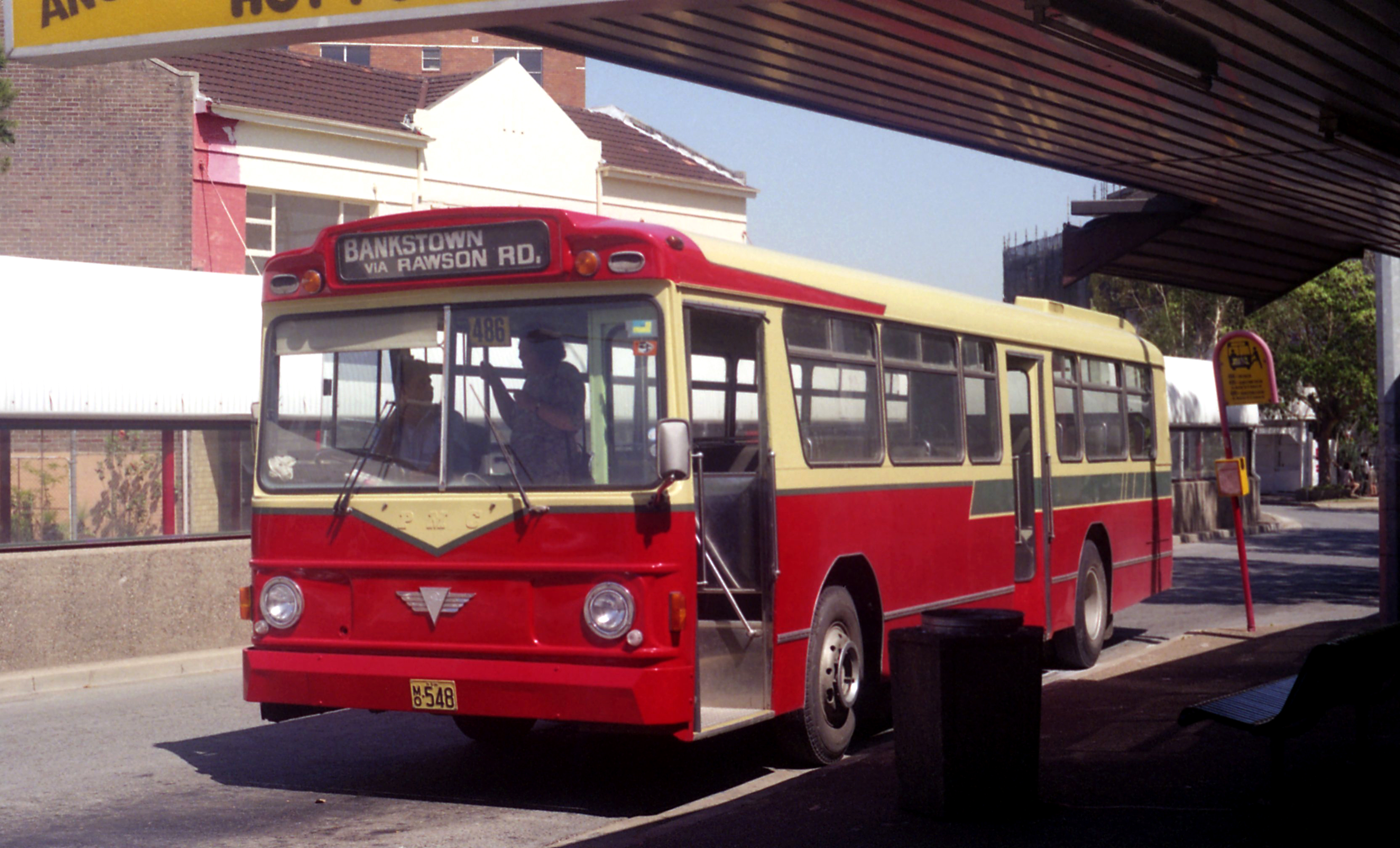
Bankstown Strathfield Bus Service Pressed Metal Corporation South Australia bodied Leyland Swift at Strathfield railway station, November 1994

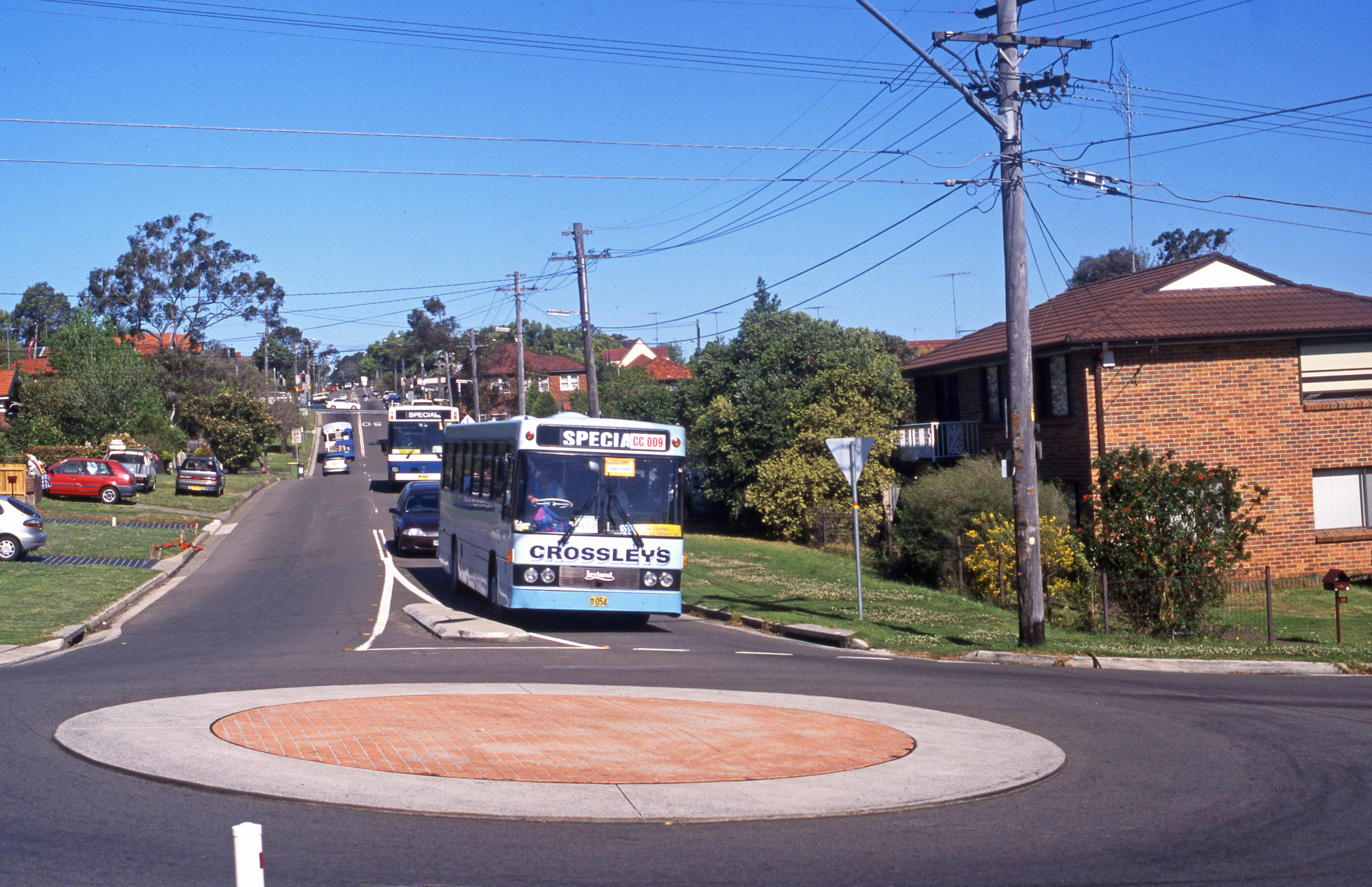
Crossley Bus Lines Custom Coaches bodied Leyland Leopard, in October 2000. The bus was sold to Westway in 2003.

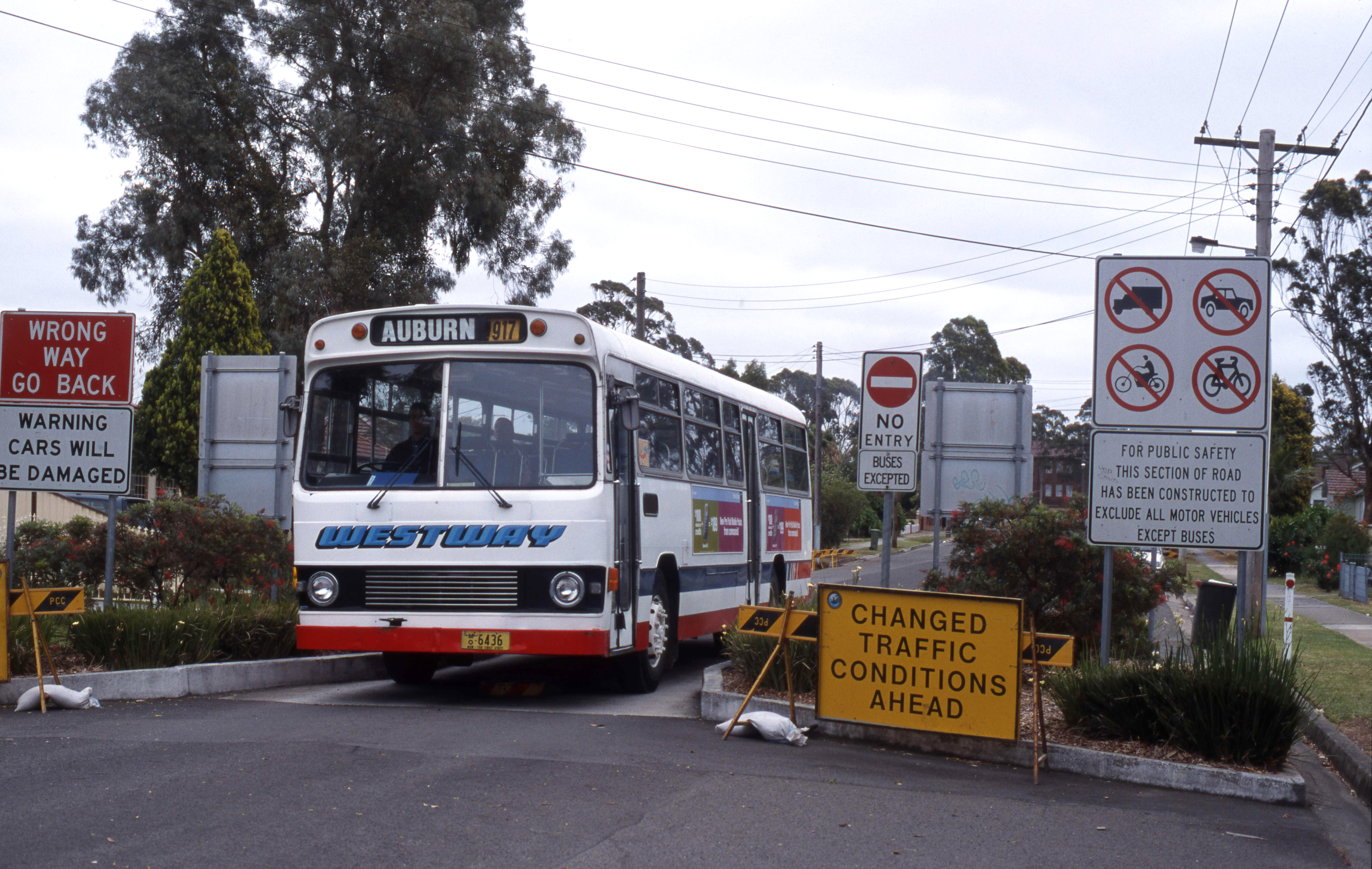
Westway Custom Coaches bodied Leyland Leopard at South Granville in October 2002

Transit First was an Australian bus company operating in the south-western suburbs of Sydney.

== History ==
Transit First's origins can be traced back to August 1982 when Peter Threlkeld purchased Holswothy Bus Co with 15 buses and services between Liverpool, Holswothy and East Hills adopting the trading name of Westway Bus & Coach Service. In July 1987 Milperra Bus Co was purchased with services between Milperra and Bankstown.

In January 1997 Westway purchased the routes 915 to 921 in the Auburn and Bankstown area from Crossley Bus Lines. In May 2003 Bankstown-Strathfield Bus Service and West Bankstown Bus Service were purchased from the Treuer family. In July 2003 the combined operation was rebranded as Transit First.

Due to the Sydney Metropolitan Bus Service Contracts that started in January 2005, some of the Baxter's Bus Lines were transferred to Connex and Transit First. In September 2006, the services that were transferred to Connex were eventually replaced by new services which were operated by Transit First.

In February 2007 Transit First was sold to Veolia Transport NSW.

== Routes ==
Transit First operated 15 bus routes in south-western Sydney:

- 900: Liverpool – Burwood via Bankstown (Formerly Route 860: Liverpool to Bankstown via Milperra)
- 901: Liverpool – Holsworthy via Wattle Grove (Formerly Route 863)
- 902: Liverpool – Holsworthy via Moorebank (Formerly Route 862)
- 902X: Voyager Point, Pleasure Point, Sandy Point (Formerly Route 862's extension)
- 903: Liverpool – Chipping Norton – Liverpool (Formerly Route 861)
- 904: Liverpool – Fairfield via Lansvale
- 905: Fairfield – Bankstown via Villawood
- 909: Bankstown – Parramatta via Auburn
- 911: Bankstown – Auburn via Chester Hill
- 913: Bankstown – Strathfield via Roberts Road
- 915: Lidcombe – University via TAFE
- 914: Greenacre – Strathfield
- 925: Bankstown – Condell Park – East Hills

== Shopper Hopper services ==
- S1: Lansvale – Cabramatta Shops
- S2: Auburn Botanic Gardens – Auburn Shops

== Fleet ==
Westway operated a varied fleet of Albions, Hinos, Leylands, MANs and Volvos. In the late 1990s it standardised on Mercedes-Benz O405s. Westway adopted a white, red and blue livery. Transit First adopted a white, green and blue livery.
