= South Sydney Bus Company =

Public bus service

- South Sydney Bus Company Leyland Titan TD1 stands on Eddy Avenue outside Central station waiting for its next trip to Brighton-Le-Sands.
- Industry: Transport
- Predecessor: Doncaster and Rosebery White Transit Company
- Defunct: 1934
- Fate: Acquired
- Successor: Department of Road Transport and Tramways
- Headquarters: Sydney, New South Wales, Australia
- Area served: South-Eastern Sydney
- Services: Public transport bus service
- Owner: T. Stalker and W. Langford

South Sydney Bus Company was a private company that operated public bus service in South-Eastern Sydney, New South Wales, Australia.

== History ==
The company, owned by T. Stalker and W. Langford, emerged from Doncaster and Rosebery White Transit Company.

From the 1920s until 31 October 1931, the company operated route 130 from Central station to Maroubra Junction. The service was deemed to be in competition with government trams and was terminated under the State Transport (Co-ordination) Act.

The company's main business was route 237, which operated between Central station and Brighton-Le-Sands via Darlinghurst, Kensington, Daceyville and Mascot. In 1931, route 237 was determined to be in competition with government trams under the State Transport (Co-ordination) Act. The service was re-licensed to operate a feeder service from Brighton-Le-Sands to Kensington, with some services extended to the factory complex at Raleigh Park. The feeder service was extended in 1933 to Ramsgate. On 8 December 1934, route 237 was taken over by the Department of Road Transport and Tramways and subsumed into its existing route 3 service. South Sydney Bus Company ceased to exist.

In 1929 passenger Harvey Fisher was awarded compensation of A£333/6/- (AUD666.60) after hitting and injuring his head when the driver of a South Sydney Bus Company vehicle collided with a telegraph pole near Todman Avenue, Kensington.

A diecast model of South Sydney Bus Company Leyland Titan TD1, registration number M/O 631, was produced by Trax Models in 2004.

== See also ==
- Buses in Sydney
