= Pioneer Coaches =

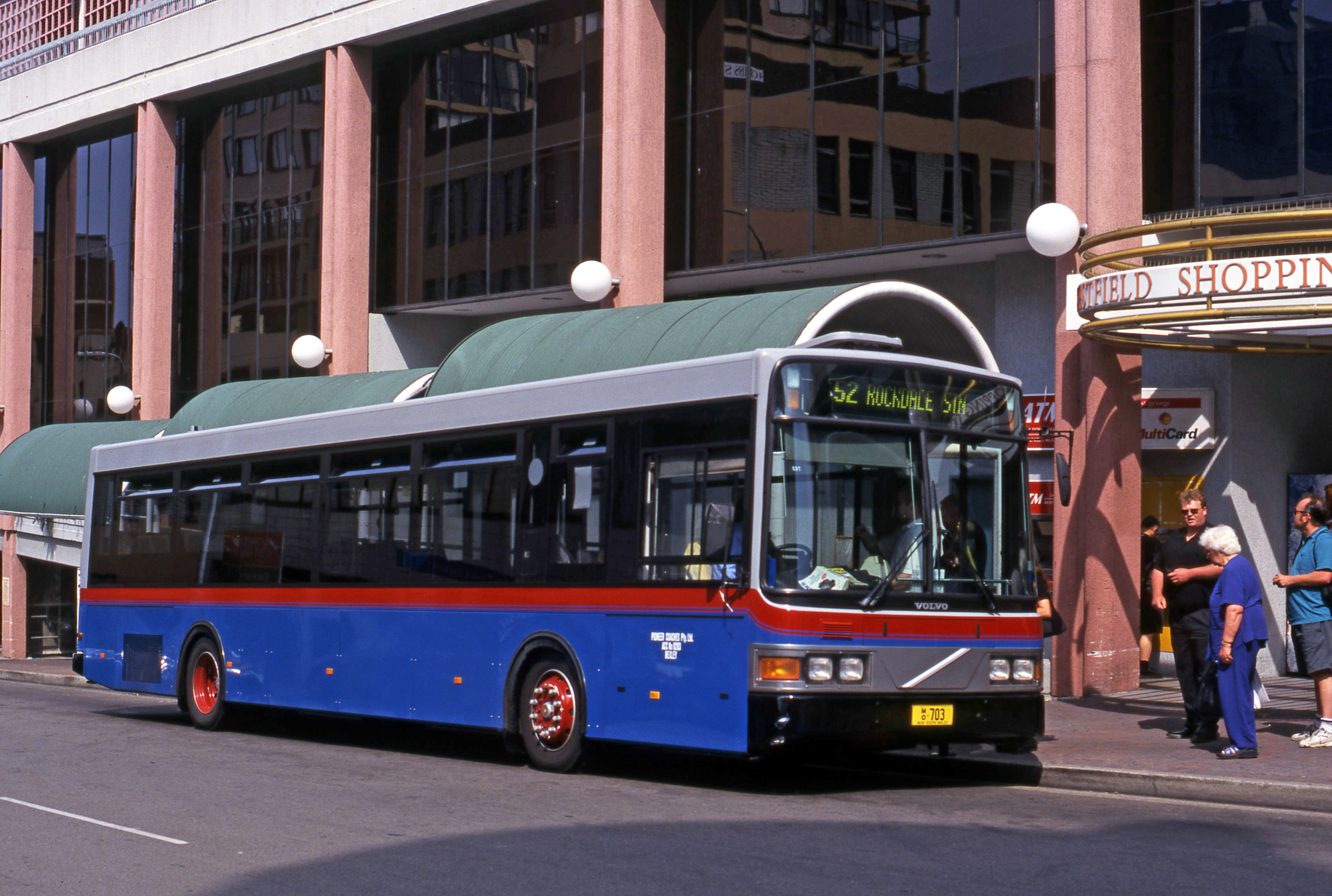
- Volgren bodied Volvo B10BLE outside Westfield Hurstville, January 2001
- Parent: Iffland family (1918–1986); Harbridge family (1986–2001)
- Commenced operation: October 1918
- Ceased operation: January 2001
- Headquarters: Bexley
- Service area: St George
- Service type: Bus services
- Depots: 1
- Fleet: 16 (January 2001)
- Website: www.pioneercoaches.com.au

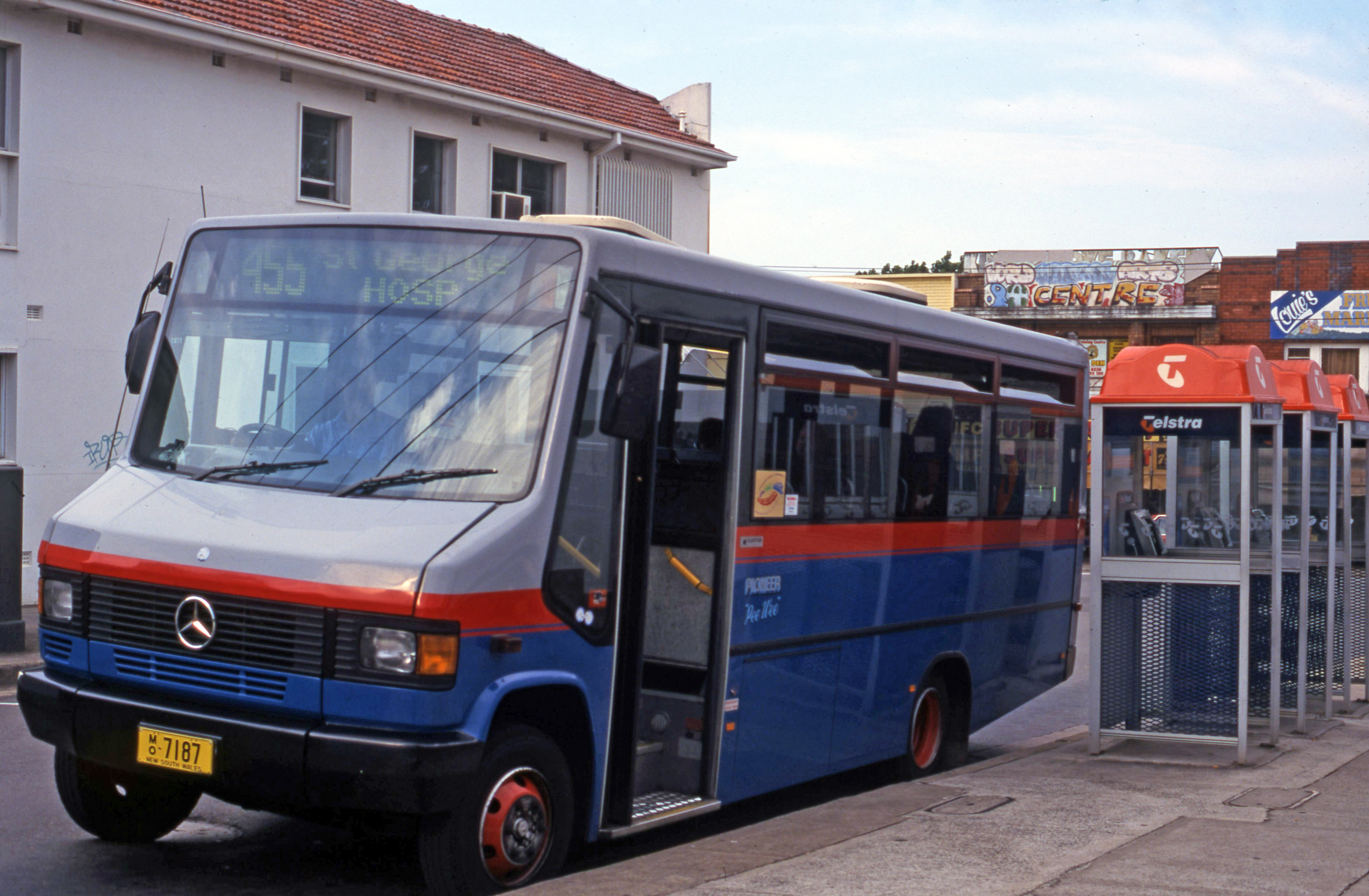
Custom Coaches bodied Mercedes LO814 at Kingsgrove, January 2001

Pioneer Coaches was an Australian bus and coach company based in Bexley, New South Wales. The company was noted for its immaculate blue and red livery, known affectionately as "the blue bus".

== History ==
In October 1918, Cornelius Bossley "Con" Iffland commenced operating between Hurstville and Rockdale via Forest Road. Allocated route number 112 in November 1925 it was extended to Brighton-Le-Sands in 1930. In 1932 the business was purchased by Con's brother Harry by which time route 112 had ceased operating to Brighton-Le-Sands but been extended at the other end to Beverley Hills. In November 1934 the operation was named Pioneer Coaches with Con's son Neville appointed manager, a position he would hold until 1982.

In December 1986, the Iffland family sold Pioneer Coaches to Kevin Harbridge. In May 1992, route 455 Kingsgrove to Kogarah via Hurstville was purchased from Allways Bus Service and in October 1996 route 49 Rockdale to Carlton from Sydney Coachlines. In April 1997, routes 112 and 49 were renumbered 452 and 453.

In January 2001, Pioneer Coaches was sold to Connex Southtrans with 16 buses.

== Final routes ==
Route	Start	Via	End
452	Rockdale	Bexley and Hurstville	Beverly Hills
453	Rockdale	Carlton	Hurstville
455	Kingsgrove	Hurstville and Kogarah	Rockdale Plaza

== Fleet ==
Pioneer Coaches operated a fleet composed predominantly of AECs, Bedfords and Leylands. Fleet livery was blue, red and grey. A vehicle from the Pioneer Coaches fleet, a 1957 AEC Reliance registered m/o 634, is preserved at the Sydney Bus Museum.

== Depot ==
Pioneer Coaches operated out of a depot in Bexley.
