= Milperra Bridge =

- Coordinates: 33°55′45″S 150°58′44″E
- Carries: Newbridge Road
- Crosses: Georges River
- Locale: Between Bankstown and Liverpool, in South Western Sydney, New South Wales, Australia
- Named for: Milperra
- Owner: Transport for NSW
- Preceded by: Governor Macquarie Drive bridge
- Followed by: M5 Motorway bridge

Characteristics
- Design: Pre-stressed concrete
- Material: Concrete
- No. of spans: 3
- Piers in water: 2
- No. of lanes: 7

History
- Construction end: 1965
- Replaces: Composite truss version (1930)

Location
- Interactive map of Milperra Bridge

Milperra Bridge is a road bridge that carries Newbridge Road across Georges River, between Canterbury-Bankstown and Liverpool local government areas, in South Western Sydney, New South Wales, Australia. The bridge is located adjacent to Henry Lawson Drive and Bankstown Airport, and Newbridge Road serves as a westerly continuation of Canterbury and Milperra Roads.

== History ==
Prior to the bridge being built, there was no road crossing of Georges River between Tom Uglys Bridge and Liverpool, although the road to Canterbury (Milperra Road) was built up to the east bank. The road over Georges River via Liverpool Weir and the later 1894 truss bridge went southeast toward Wollongong via Old Illawarra Road, through what is now the Holsworthy Military Reserve.

There was call for access between the two post-World War I soldier settlement areas at Chipping Norton and Milperra, and a punt was proposed in the early 1920s.

The subsequent early design for the bridge by the Department of Public Works showed a height above water of only 4 metres (12 ft) which was much decried by the locals, requesting the Department to raise it, for the commercial and sporting interests of the area. The Department replied with a proposal of 5 metres (17 ft). The bridge, a two-lane three-span wooden truss bridge, was opened to traffic in April 1931.

By the 1960s, this bridge was not able to cope with the increase in traffic and was slated for replacement.

The current prestressed concrete structure, 85 m long, is wider and higher than the previous bridge, and carries six lanes of traffic. It was built in two stages, with the eastbound half being built first, immediately upstream of the original bridge. This opened for two-way traffic in October 1965 and the earlier bridge was then demolished and the other half of the new bridge, for westbound traffic, was built on the site of the original bridge.

The replacement bridge was completed and opened in February 1966.

== Associated Construction ==
The new bridge was part of a simultaneous upgrading of Milperra and Newbridge Roads, which were widened to six lanes from Victoria St Revesby to what is now Kelso Crescent Moorebank (Kelso Crescent was previously part of Epsom Rd, with Newbridge Road terminating at Epsom Rd).

The section of Newbridge Road from Kelso Crescent westward had been reconstructed to six lanes in 1958, in conjunction with the construction of Liverpool Bridge.

Milperra Bridge
- Coordinates: 33°55′46″S 150°58′44″E
- Carried: Newbridge Road
- Crossed: Georges River
- Other name: Moorebank Bridge
- Owner: Transport for NSW

Characteristics
- Design: Composite truss
- Material: Timber
- Total length: 72 metres (237 ft)
- Width: 6 metres (20 ft)
- Longest span: 27 metres (90 ft)
- No. of spans: 6
- Piers in water: 5
- Clearance below: 5 metres (17 ft)

History
- Opened: 18 April 1931
- Collapsed: 1965
- Replaced by: Current bridge

Location
- Interactive map of Milperra Bridge
