= Telfords Bus & Coach =

Australian bus company

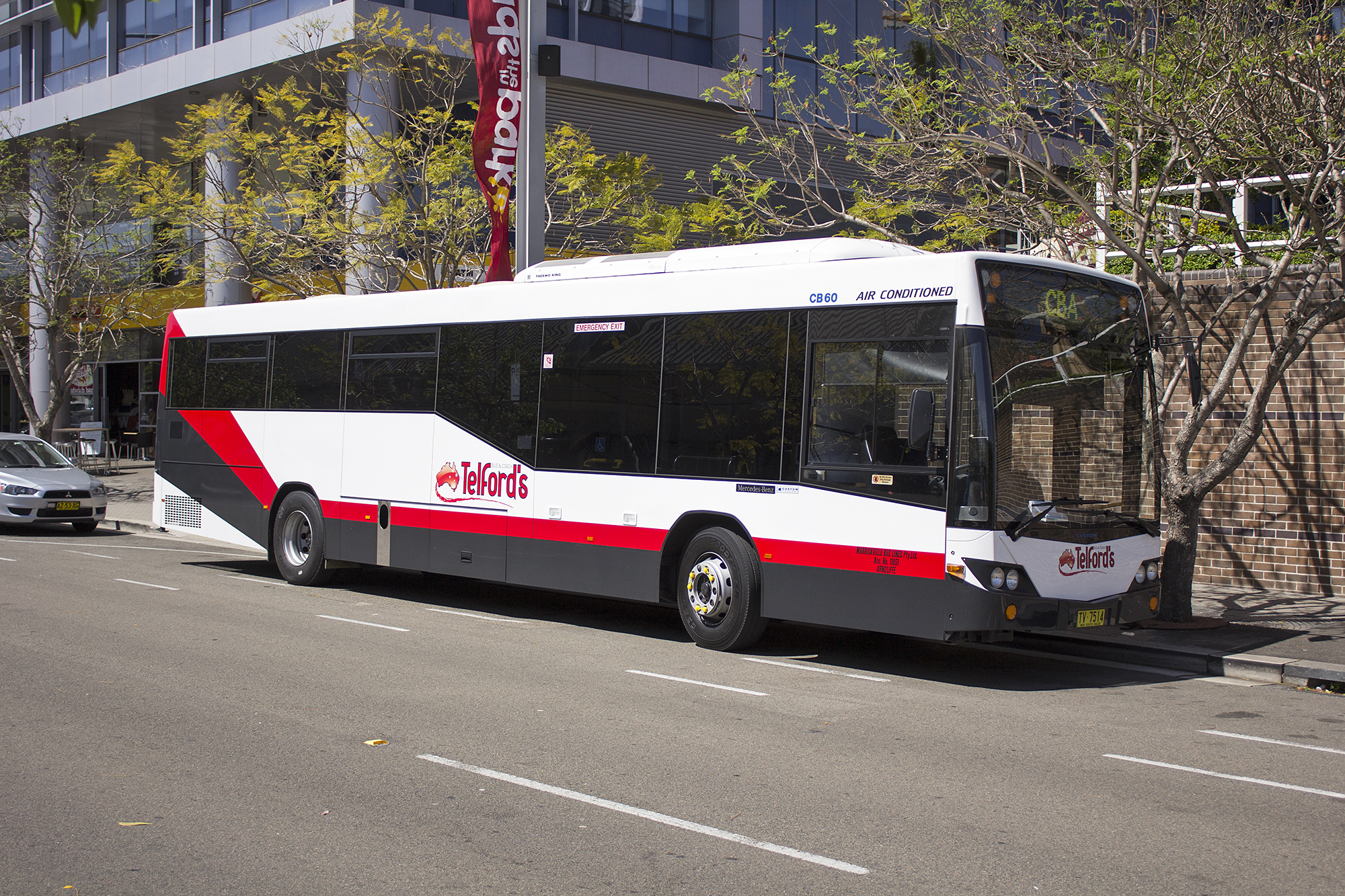
- Custom Coaches bodied Mercedes-Benz OH1830LE at Sydney Olympic Park in September 2013
- Parent: Kinetic
- Headquarters: Turrella
- Service area: Sydney
- Service type: Bus operator
- Depots: 1
- Fleet: 68 (September 2024)
- Website: www.wearekinetic.com

Telfords Bus & Coach, formerly Marrickville Bus Lines and latterly Kinetic Sydney, was an Australian bus company operating charter services in Sydney. it was a subsidiary of Kinetic.

== History ==
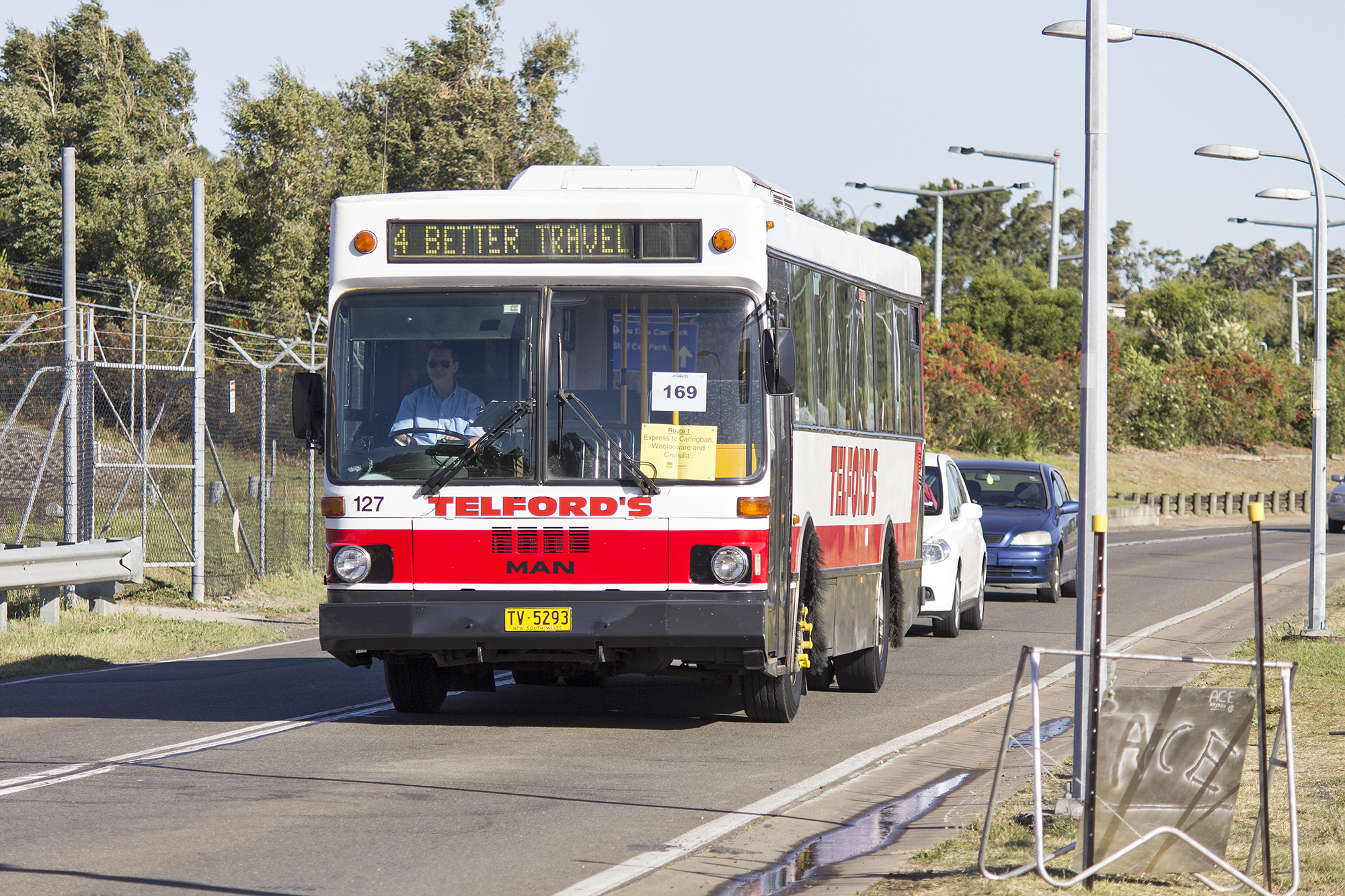
Ansair bodied MAN SL200 at Sydney Airport in September 2013

In 1973, Marrickville Bus Lines was purchased by Max Holman from Barry Barton. In May 1977, the business was sold to Bob Wood and renamed Orana Tours. In January 1978, the business was purchased by Benny Rachwal and resumed trading as Marrickville Bus Lines. One route was operated, 222 Dulwich Hill to Sydenham.

In January 1989, Marrickville commenced operating five routes in the White Bay/Bondi Junction/Marrickville areas on an interim basis after the collapse of ABC Coachlines. These were taken over by Arrow Coaches in April 1989. Marrickville also commenced providing buses for The Scots College. This segment of the business would grow rapidly, with Marrickville winning work from many Eastern Suburbs and Inner West schools.

In the 1980s, Marrickville purchased the business of Telford Educational Tours. Having been renumbered to 448 in November 1987, the remaining route was taken over by Sydney Buses in January 2004.

In October 2013, Benny Rachwald died with the business passing to his sons, Robert and James. In May 2014, Telfords was sold to Dunn Motor Traction.

On 1 May 2015, the Tiger Tours business at Taren Point was purchased with 11 vehicles, and was merged into the Telford operation. In Pegasus Coach Tours of Riverstone was purchased.

In November 2019, the business was sold to Kinetic. In 2022 the Telfords brand was retired in favour of the Kinetic brand. It ceased its commercial charter operations in Sydney in December 2024.

== Services ==
Telfords operated services from Macquarie Park to Epping station under contract to Optus and from Sydney Olympic Park to Lidcombe station, Strathfield station and the Sydney central business district under contract to the Commonwealth Bank. It also operates school buses for various Eastern Suburbs and Inner West schools.

On 23 March 2015, Telfords commenced operating an express commuter service from Rouse Hill to the Sydney CBD under the Your Commute brand. This was previously operated by Bankstown Coaches as the Bullet Bus until November 2014.

== Fleet ==
As at September 2024, the fleet consisted of 68 buses and coaches.
