= Transdev NSW =

Operator of bus services in Sydney, Australia

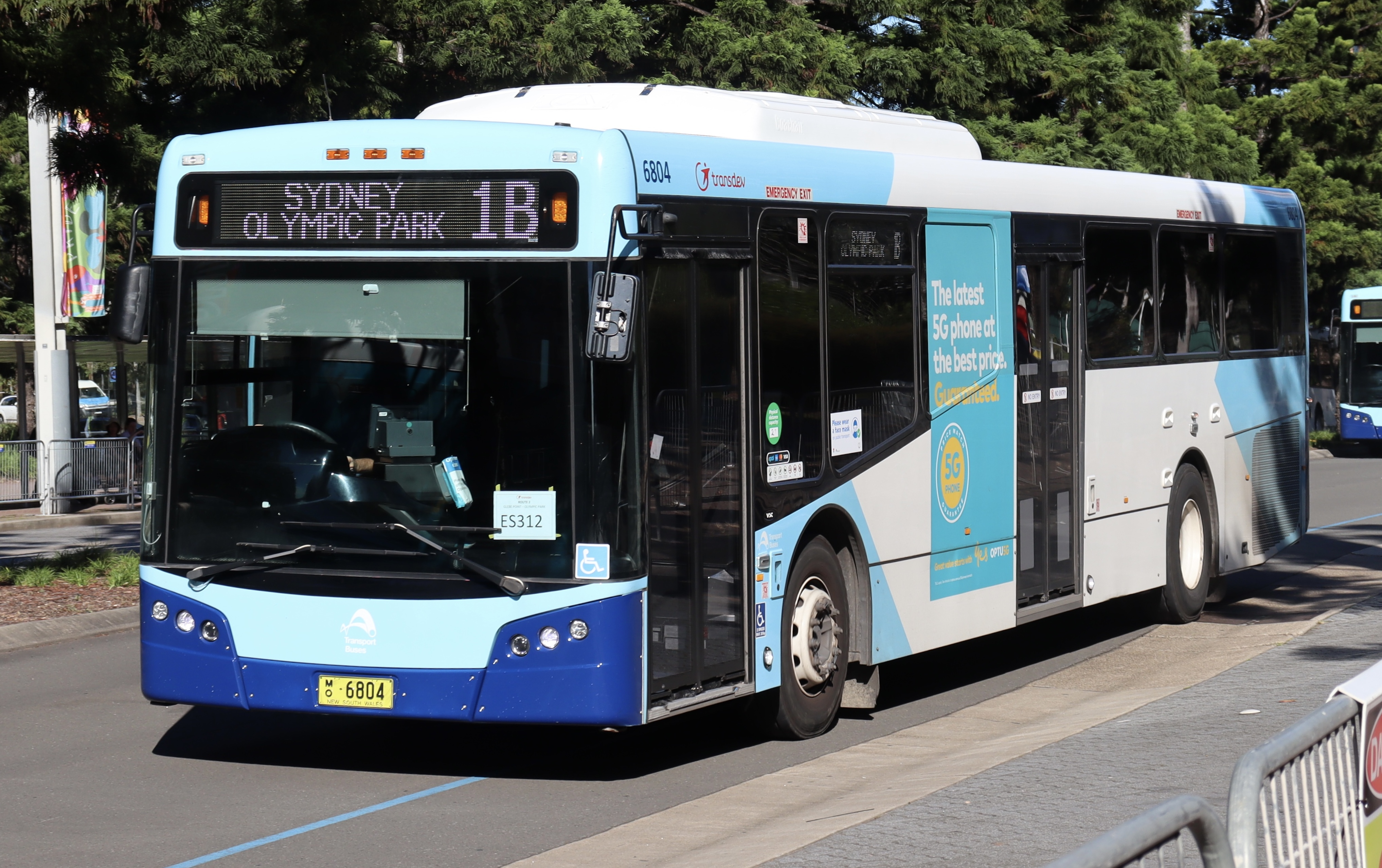
- Bustech bodied Volvo B8RLE
- Parent: Transdev
- Commenced operation: February 1935; 91 years ago
- Ceased operation: 5 August 2023; 3 years ago
- Headquarters: Bankstown Airport
- Service area: North Shore, South & Western Sydney
- Service type: Bus services
- Routes: 86 (April 2023)
- Depots: Bankstown; Kingsgrove; Menai; Mount Kuring-gai; Revesby; South Granville; Taren Point
- Fleet: 461 (November 2021)
- Website: www.transdevnsw.com.au

Transdev NSW was a bus operator in the northern, southern and western suburbs of Sydney, Australia. It was a subsidiary of Transdev.

With origins tracing back to February 1935, Transdev NSW was renamed from Veolia Transport NSW in July 2013 after the global rebranding of its parent company Veolia Transdev to simply Transdev. During this time, Transdev Shorelink, another Transdev bus operation in Sydney, was absorbed into Transdev NSW.

Between May and August 2023, its operations passed to CDC NSW, Transit Systems and U-Go Mobility after the regions it operated were re-tendered.

== History ==
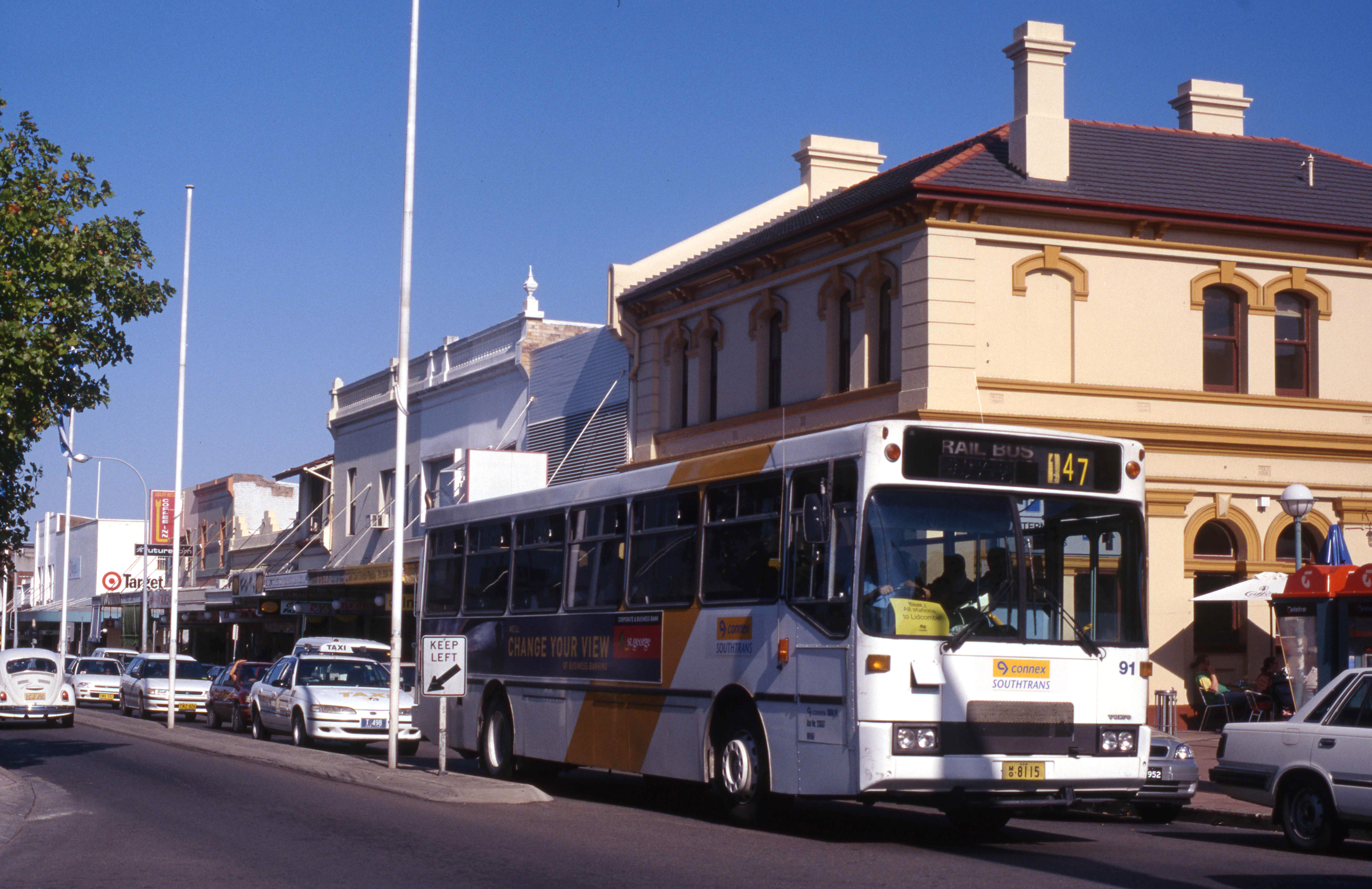
Connex Southtrans Pressed Metal Corporation bodied Volvo B10M in April 2002

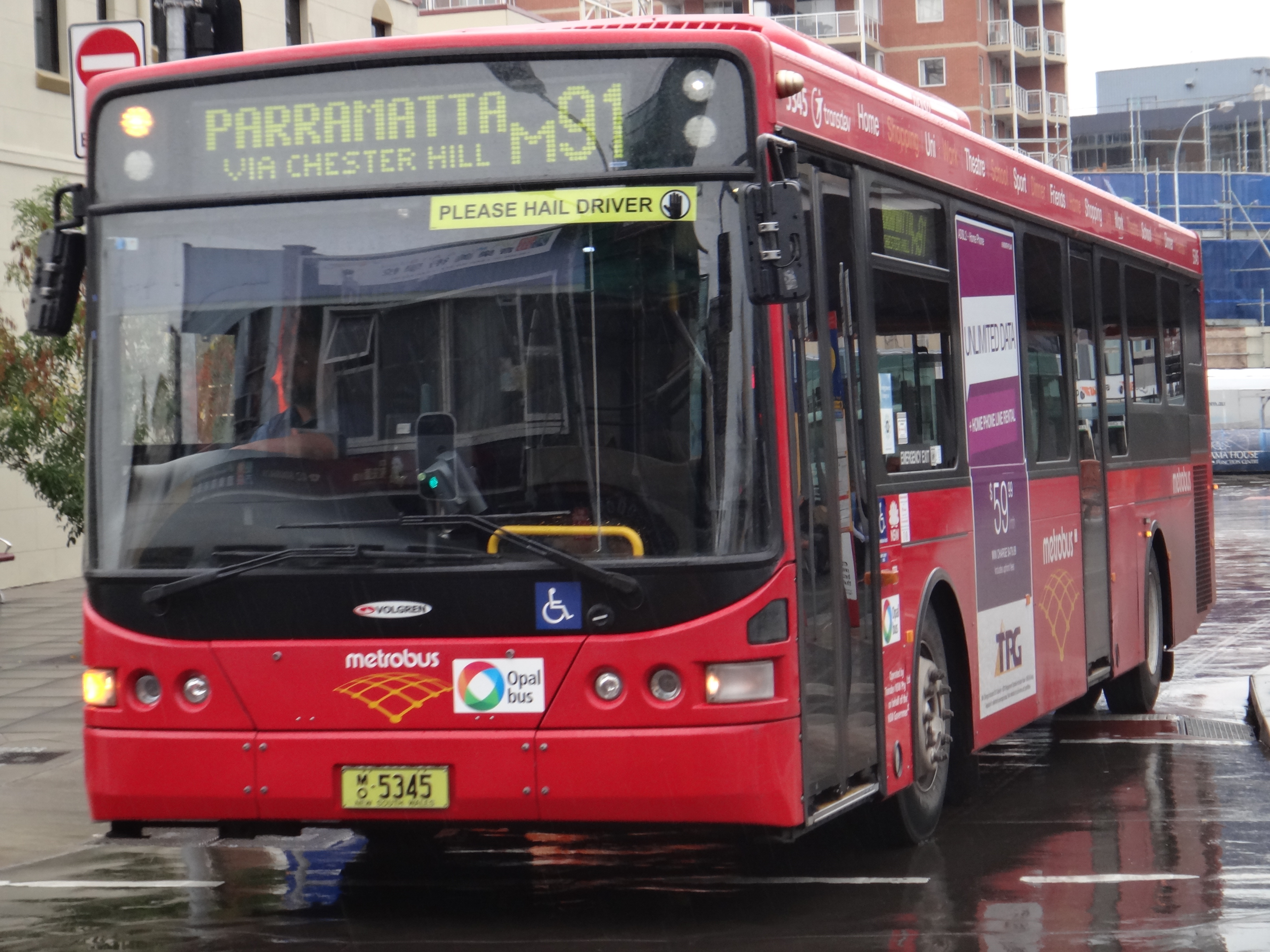
Volgren bodied Volvo B7RLE at Hurstville station

The origins of Transdev NSW can be traced back to February 1935 when GH Ramsay commenced a bus service between Sutherland station and Woronora River. It was sold to Mayman Brothers in 1948 and Doug and Barry Smith in 1966 trading as Woronora Bus Company. Following the opening of the Alfords Point Bridge in September 1973 the service was extended to Padstow station. The operation was renamed Menai Bus Service.

In August 1988, Menai Bus Service was purchased by Ron Deane who at the time operated Deanes Coaches on the North Shore. In March 1989 the Hurstville to Bankstown and Lugarno services of Peakhurst Coaches were purchased, although the latter was sold in August 1989 to Punchbowl Bus Company. In July 1989, the business of Hadfields Bus Lines, Engadine was purchased and at this point, all the operations were rebranded as Southtrans. In October 1990, three routes were transferred from South Western Coach Lines, followed in December 1990 by two routes from Sutherland Bus Service.

Other bus companies subsequently acquired were:

- Carss Park Chartered Tours & Bus Lines in December 1993
- Kogarah-Carss Park Bus Service (Blythe's), Bexley in April 1994
- Pioneer Coaches in January 2001
- Crossley Bus Lines, Revesby in November 2001
- Transit First in February 2007
- Crowthers, Caringbah in January 2009
- Caringbah Bus Service in October 2011

Crowthers remained as charter operator as of January 2016. Caringbah Bus Service also remained as a charter operator under their previous charter operation name Tiger Tours until May 2015, when the business was purchased by Dunn Motor Traction and merged into its Telford's Bus & Coach operations.

In September 1999, Southtrans was sold to French transport company Connex (a subsidiary of the then Vivendi Environnement, now Veolia Environnement) and became Connex Southtrans. It was renamed to Connex NSW in 2002. In January 2005, the Granville and Bankstown routes of Baxter's Bus Lines were transferred to Connex and Transit First and became part of Region 13.

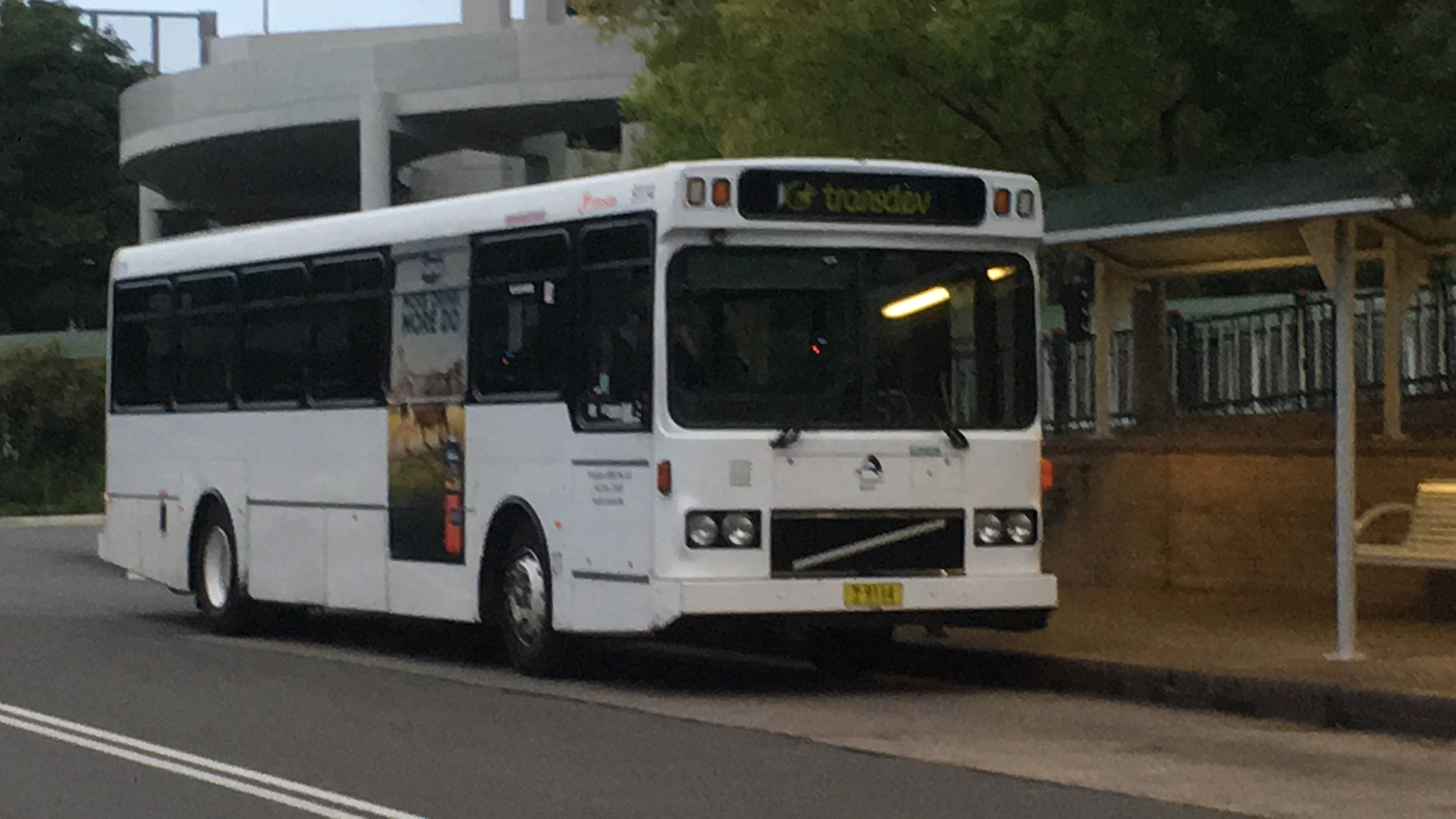
Volvo B10M Mk III at Sutherland Station.

In April 2006, the company was renamed Veolia Transport NSW as part of a global re-branding exercise of the company. Soon after, Veolia undertook a re-organisation and simplification of its route services across Region 13 in September 2006 and Region 10 in November 2007. However, many of the altered Region 10 bus routes were later restored to their original state due to a severe decline in passenger numbers and high levels of passenger complaints. The idea to make bus services "straighter" did not have a welcome reception with passengers who preferred convenience as opposed to speed for the sake of it on shorter routes.

In February 2007, Veolia bought out its Region 13 partner Transit First which included the transfer of 86 buses, 15 routes and the lease on the current Bankstown Airport depot. This purchase also saw Veolia move its head office from Taren Point to Bankstown Airport. In January 2009, Region 11 operator Crowthers was purchased followed in October 2011 by fellow Region 11 operator Caringbah Bus Service.

In March 2011, Veolia Transport worldwide merged with French-German company Transdev, to form Veolia Transdev. As a result, in July 2013, Veolia Transport NSW was renamed Transdev NSW. Later that year, fellow Transdev subsidiary Transdev Shorelink, was also absorbed into the Transdev NSW business. Rebranding of all Transdev NSW buses to the new Transdev logo took place in mid 2014. A new website for all Transdev NSW public bus operations was opened on 8 September 2014.

After its regions were re-tendered, region 12 services were taken over by CDC NSW on 21 May 2023, region 10 services by U-Go Mobility on 1 July 2023 and region 13 services by Transit Systems on 6 August 2023. Transdev NSW also wound up its charter bus operations.

== Operations ==
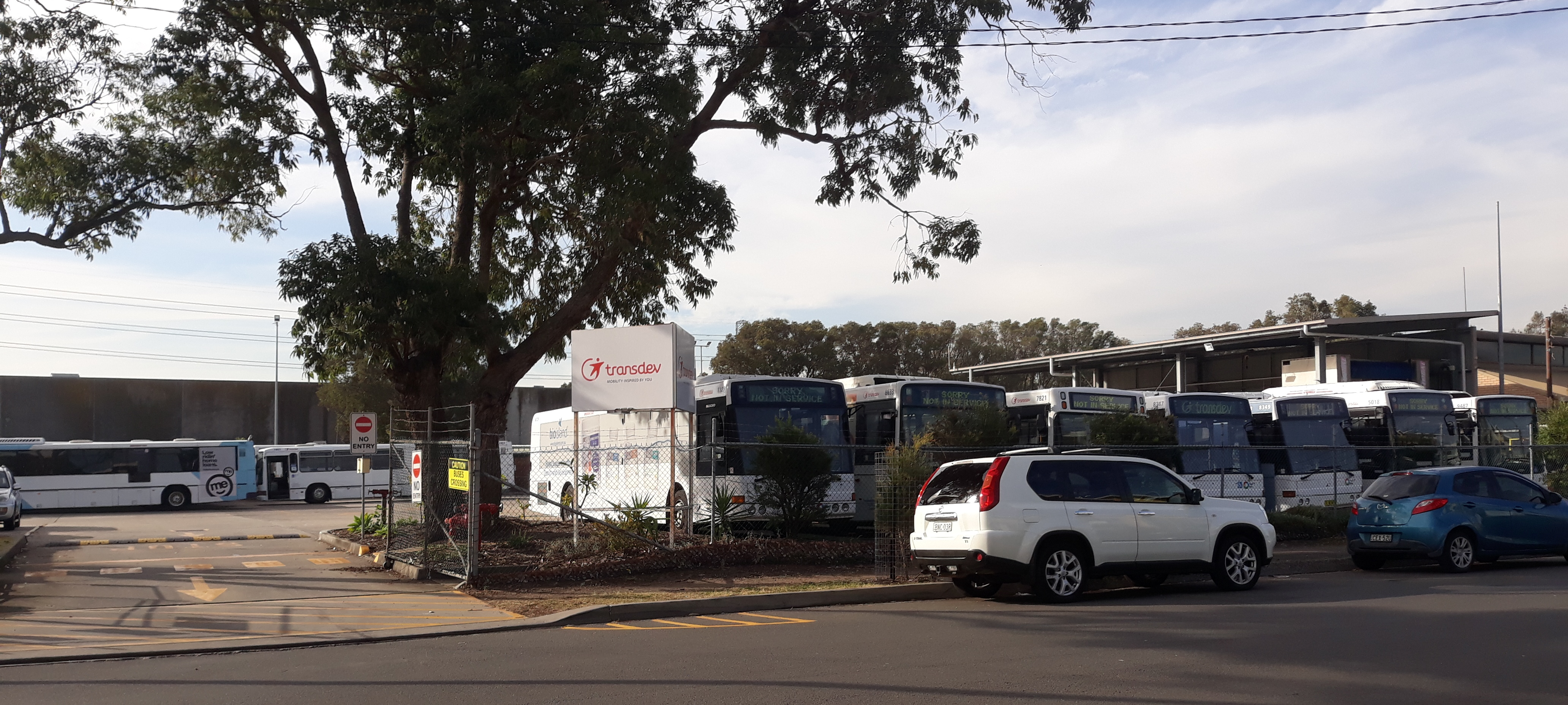
Transdev bus depot in Taren Point

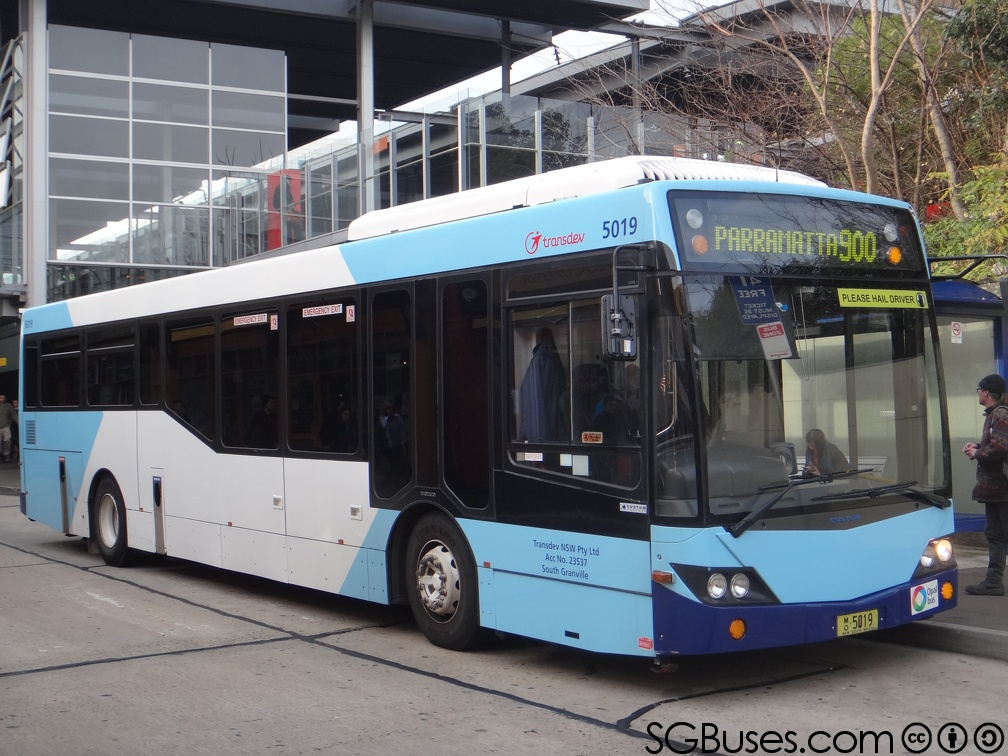
Custom Coaches bodied Volvo B7RLE in Transport for NSW livery

Transdev NSW operated the Region 13 commuter bus services and previously operated Region 10 and 12 services, under contract to Transport for NSW. Regions 10 services were operated by the company (then Connex) since the early 2000s. Region 11 and 13 services became fully operated by the company after the acquisition of other bus companies such as Transit First in the late 2000s and early 2010s. As a result, the smaller Region 11 was merged into the larger neighbouring Region 10. Transdev NSW also took responsibility for Transdev Shorelink routes in Region 12 in 2014, resulting in Transdev NSW operating in both northern and southern Sydney.

In November 2012, Transdev Shorelink retained the contract to operate Region 12, and this contract was passed on to Transdev NSW in 2014. Also in January 2013, Veolia were granted seven year extensions to their Region 10 and 13 contracts. In November 2022, the contract for Region 12 was awarded to rival operator ComfortDelGro Australia. Existing services operated by Transdev NSW were taken over by CDC NSW in May 2023.

Transdev NSW operated bus routes from depots at Bankstown Airport, Kingsgrove, Menai, Mount Kuring-gai, Revesby, South Granville and Taren Point. Transdev operated three of Sydney's Metrobus routes: M90 between Liverpool and Burwood, M91 between Hurstville and Parramatta and M92 between Sutherland and Parramatta. Transdev also operated one bus route to the Sydney CBD: 594 from North Turramurra.

Transdev jointly operated the temporary North West Night Bus (NW1 & NW2) with Hillsbus from May 2019 until November 2019. The bus service stopped at stations along the Metro North West Line on Sunday to Wednesday nights. Transdev also used to operate the Station Link services (SLx series) between September 2018 and May 2019, while the Epping to Chatswood rail link was closed for upgrading and conversion to Sydney Metro Northwest. The Station Link stopped at Epping, Chatswood, Macquarie Park, Eastwood, Macquarie University, Beecroft and St Leonards stations. Like the North West Night Bus, it was jointly operated with Hillsbus.

== Fleet ==
As of November 2021, the fleet consisted of 461 buses. Most of the buses have white liveries. The fronts of the older white buses were originally yellow and were repainted when the company was rebranded as Veolia in April 2006. Buses dedicated to the Metrobus operation had a red livery applied, there was also dedicated free shuttle bus liveries though this was later removed. Since 2010 the Transport for NSW white and blue livery progressively began to be applied to the bus fleet.
