= Baxter's Coaches =

Australian bus charter company in Sydney

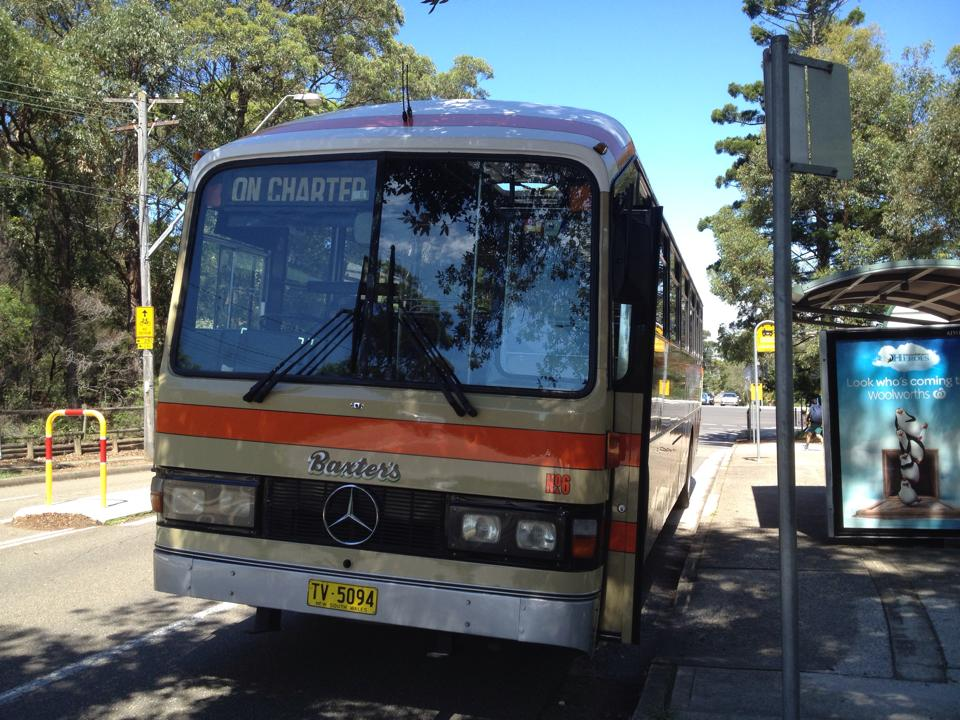
- Newnham bodied Mercedes-Benz OC1621 in March 2014
- Parent: Baxter family
- Commenced operation: 1981
- Headquarters: Girraween
- Service type: Coach charter services
- Depots: 1
- Fleet: 28 (September 2021)
- Website: baxterscoaches.com.au

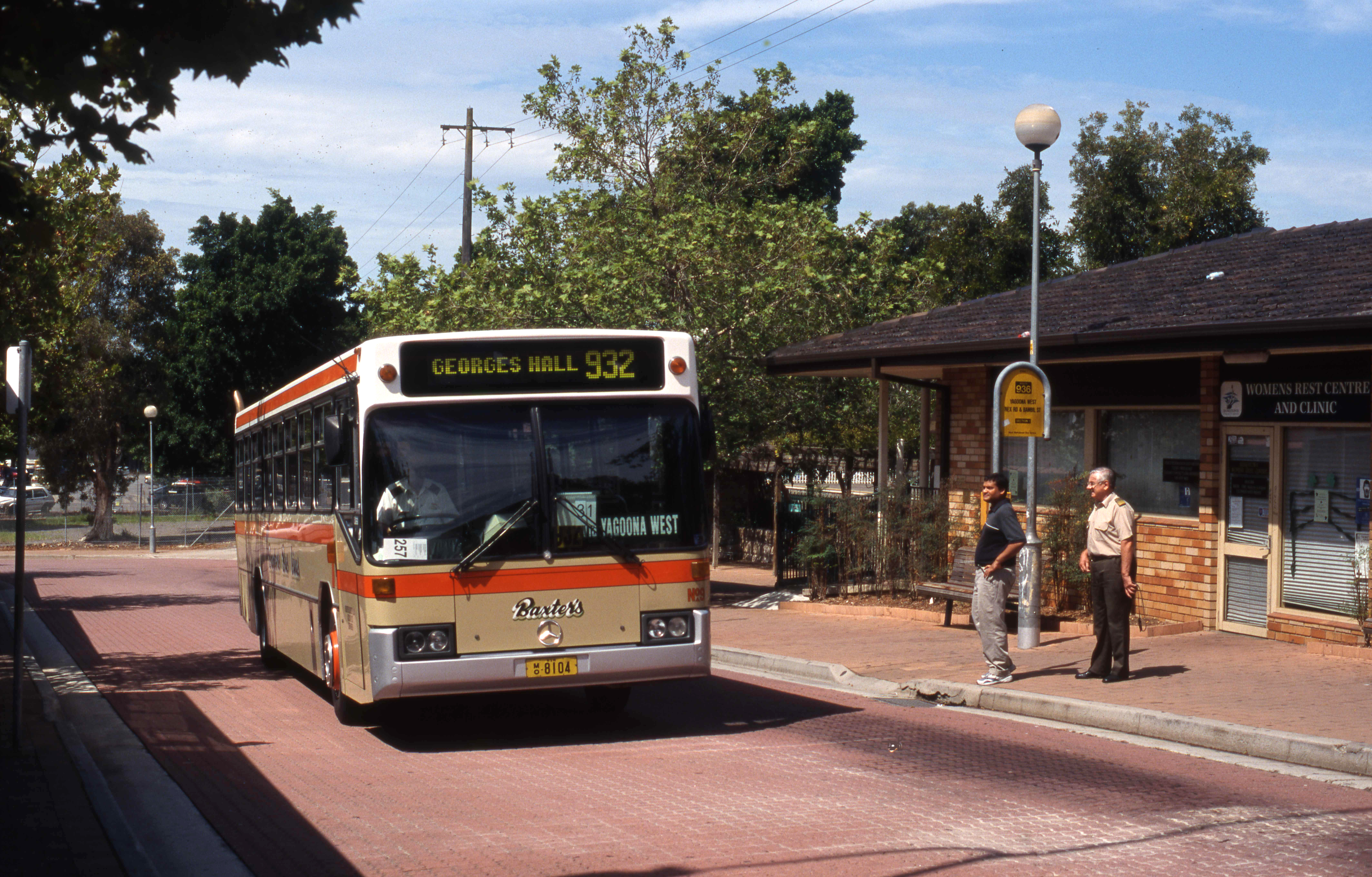
Pressed Metal Corporation bodied Mercedes O405 at Bankstown railway station, March 2003

Baxter's Coaches is an Australian bus charter company in Sydney. Until August 2006, it operated route bus services in Western Sydney.

== History ==
Baxter's Coaches was founded by Roy Baxter and his son Garry after the Merrylands based services of Barklimore Brothers were purchased in April 1981. In January 1987 the Wentworthville services of Western Road Transport Services were acquired.

In April 1992, the Granville based services of Delwood Coaches were purchased, and in June 1995 the services of Bass Hill Bus Service were acquired. The Bass Hill bus services were renumbered 930 and 932 from 20 and 21 shortly after, while the Villawood part of route 21 was amalgamated with ex Delwood route 902.

In April 2004, bus services 817 and 818 were transferred from Bustrans to Baxter's. They were soon transferred to Transit First along with the former Bass Hill Bus routes 930 and 932 in January 2005. On the same day, the former Delwood Coaches services were transferred to Connex NSW In August 2006, the remaining bus services were sold and transferred to Westbus.

Baxter's also operates a charter fleet and after the bus services were sold, was retained and relocated to Glendenning. Following Westbus vacating the Girraween depot, Baxer's moved back in December 2013.

Bus routes transferred to Connex in January 2005:

- 902 Bankstown – Yagoona – Villawood – Granville – Parramatta
- 903/905 Merrylands – Excelsior St – Blaxcell St – Granville – Alfred St – Parramatta
- 904 Lidcombe – Auburn – Parramatta
- 910 Chester Hill – Clyde St – Granville – Parramatta

Bus routes transferred to Transit First in January 2005:

- 817 Fairfield – Lansvale – Cabramatta
- 818 Fairfield – Chester Hill
- 930 Bankstown – Bankstown Hospital – Bankstown Showground
- 932 Georges Hall – Bass Hill – Glassop St – Yagoona – Bankstown

Remaining bus routes transferred to Westbus in September 2006:

- 810 Merrylands – South Wentworthville – Parramatta
- 811/813/815 Merrylands – Greystanes – Parramatta
- 812 Merrylands – Gilroy Village – Merrylands West
- 814 Merrylands – South Wentworthville – Westmead

== Fleet ==
As at September 2021, the fleet consisted of 28 buses and coaches. Baxter's fleet livery has always been fawn with an orange stripe. Fleet presentation has always been a high priority with vehicles rarely seen in anything but pristine condition.
