= Maianbar Bundeena Bus Service =

Australian bus company

- Parent: Peter Leahy
- Commenced operation: April 1953
- Headquarters: Bundeena
- Service area: Southern Sydney
- Service type: Bus services
- Routes: 989
- Depots: 1
- Fleet: 1 (February 2026)
- Website: www.maianbarbundeenabus.com

Maianbar Bundeena Bus Service is an Australian bus company operating services in southern Sydney.

== History ==
In April 1953, SM Allison commenced operating route 64 Bundeena Wharf to Bonnie Vale Camping Ground. After passing through a number of owners, the business was purchased by Peter Leahy in 1983. This was followed in 1989 by Bundeena Bus Service being purchased from Western Road Liners. In 2018 the service was purchased and continued by the Straney family. The 989 service continues under MBBS's stewardship, operating as the smallest private GMBC contracted operator in Sydney, under U-Go Mobility's Region 10.

== Routes ==
They operate bus route 989 for local bus services between Maianbar and Bundeena on school days only. In addition there is one return trip every Wednesday to Engadine and one return trip every Friday to Miranda both from Bundeena via Maianbar and through the Royal National Park. Since 2005 Bundeena Bus' services have been part of Sydney Bus Region 11, now Region 10.

== Fleet ==
As of February 2026, the fleet consists of 1 bus, a 2006 Mercedes-Benz O500LE with a Bustech VST body and proprietary livery, registered as m/o 9074.
