= South Granville, New South Wales =

South Granville
- Suburb
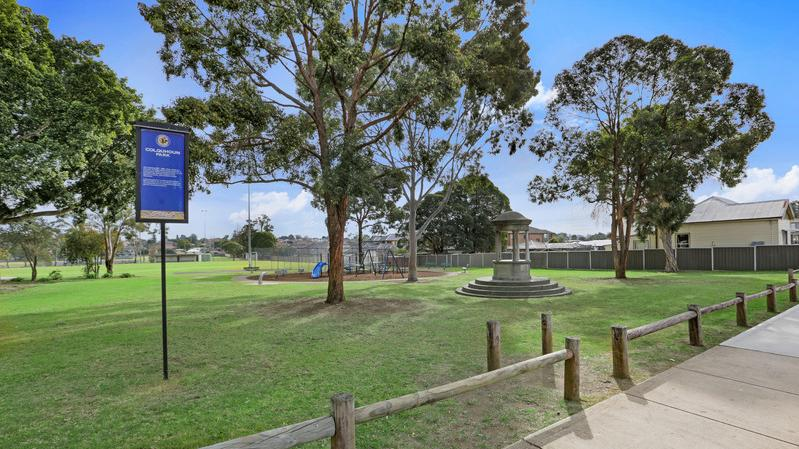
- Colquhoun Park

- Interactive map of South Granville
- Coordinates: 33°51′16″S 151°0′15″E
- Country: Australia
- State: New South Wales
- City: Sydney
- LGA: Cumberland City Council
- Location: 23 km (14 mi) west of Sydney CBD

Government
  - State electorates: Auburn; Granville
  - Federal division: Blaxland
- Elevation: 20 m (66 ft)

Population
  - Total: 5,829 (2021 census)
- Postcode: 2142
Suburbs around South Granville
Merrylands	Granville	Clyde
Guildford	South Granville	Auburn
Chester Hill	Sefton	Regents Park

South Granville is a suburb in western Sydney, in the state of New South Wales, Australia. It is located 23 kilometres (14 mi) west of the Sydney central business district, in the local government area of the Cumberland City Council.

South Granville is an extension of Granville. They share the postcode of 2142 along with the separate suburbs of Camellia, Holroyd and Rosehill.

== History ==
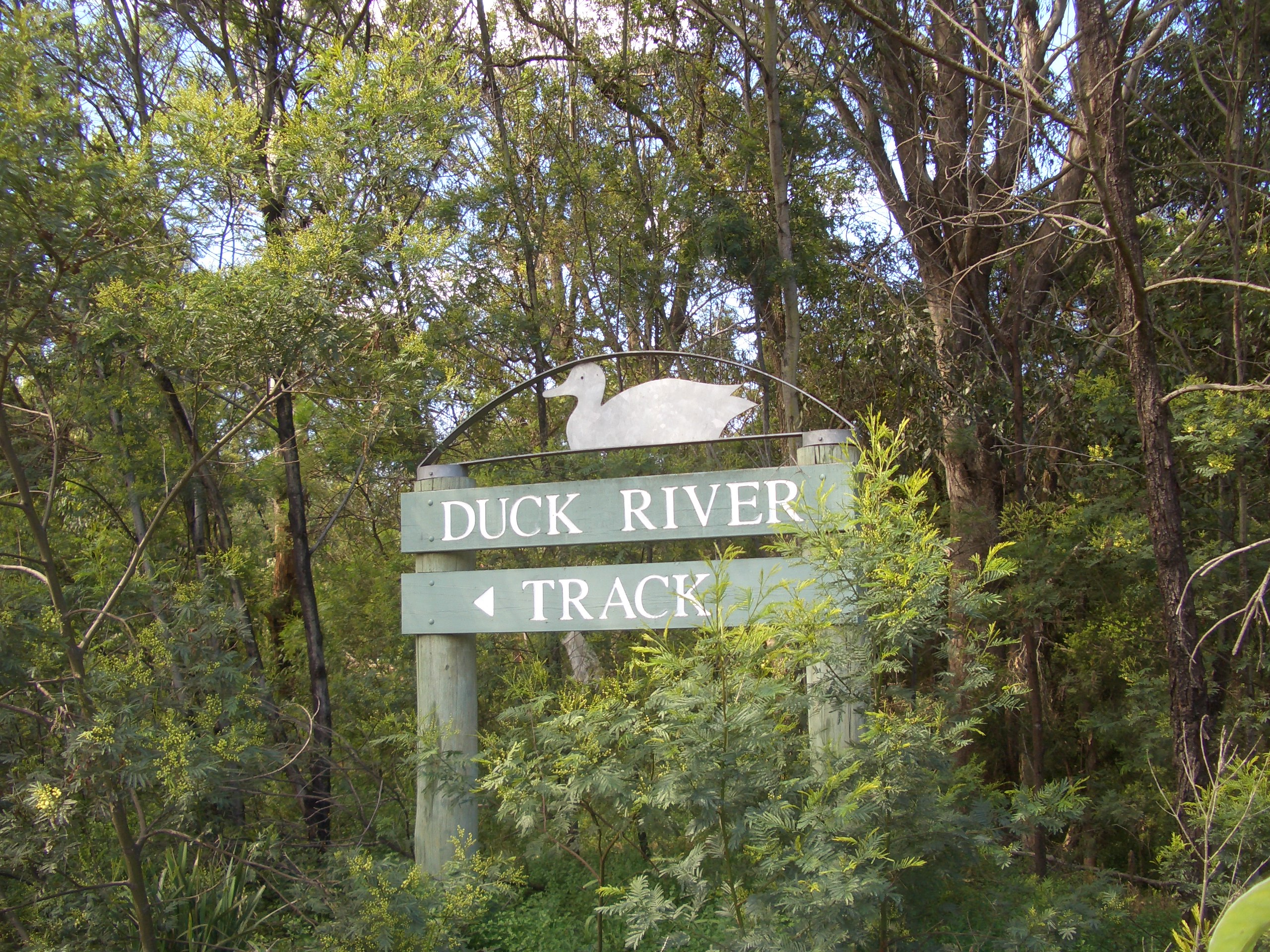
Duck River Track, Wellington Road

Granville was named in 1880, after the British Colonial Secretary, the Granville Leveson-Gower, 2nd Earl Granville.

== Parks and sports grounds ==
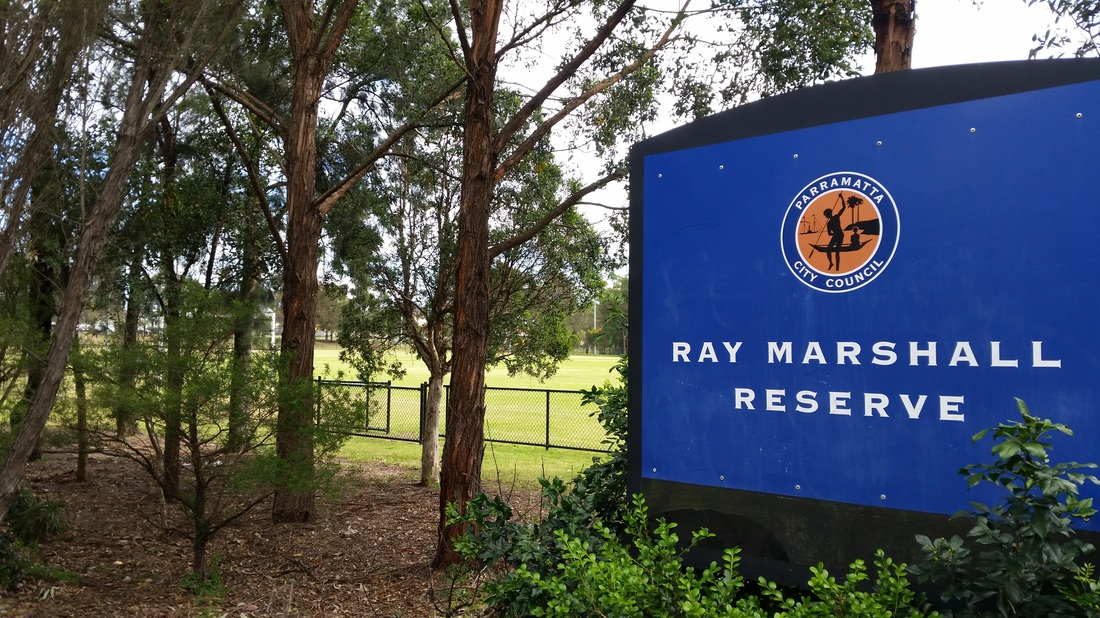
Ray Marshall Reserve

- Ray Marshall Reserve
- Horlyck Reserve and playground
- Harry Gapes Reserve
- Colquhoun Park
- Everley Park
- Melita Stadium

== Education ==
There are a number of schools around South Granville including Granville East Public School, Blaxcell Street Public School, and Holy Family Primary School, Granville South Creative and Performing Arts High School, and Granville South Public School
