= Custom Denning =

Australian bus body manufacturer

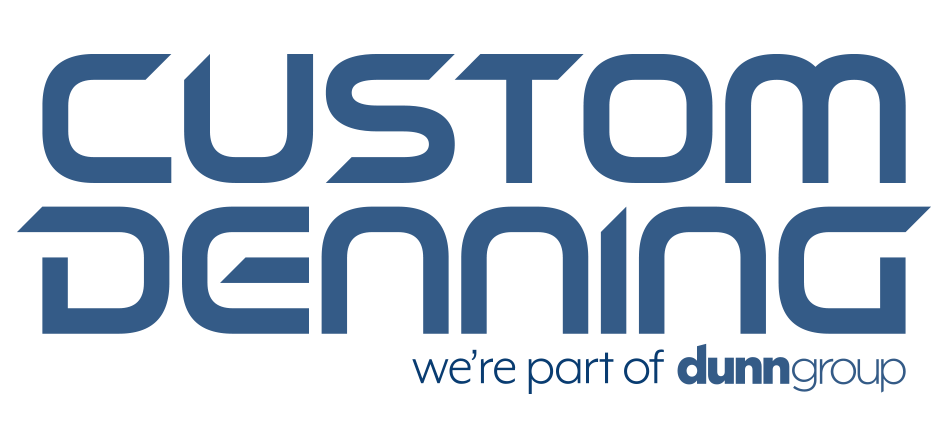

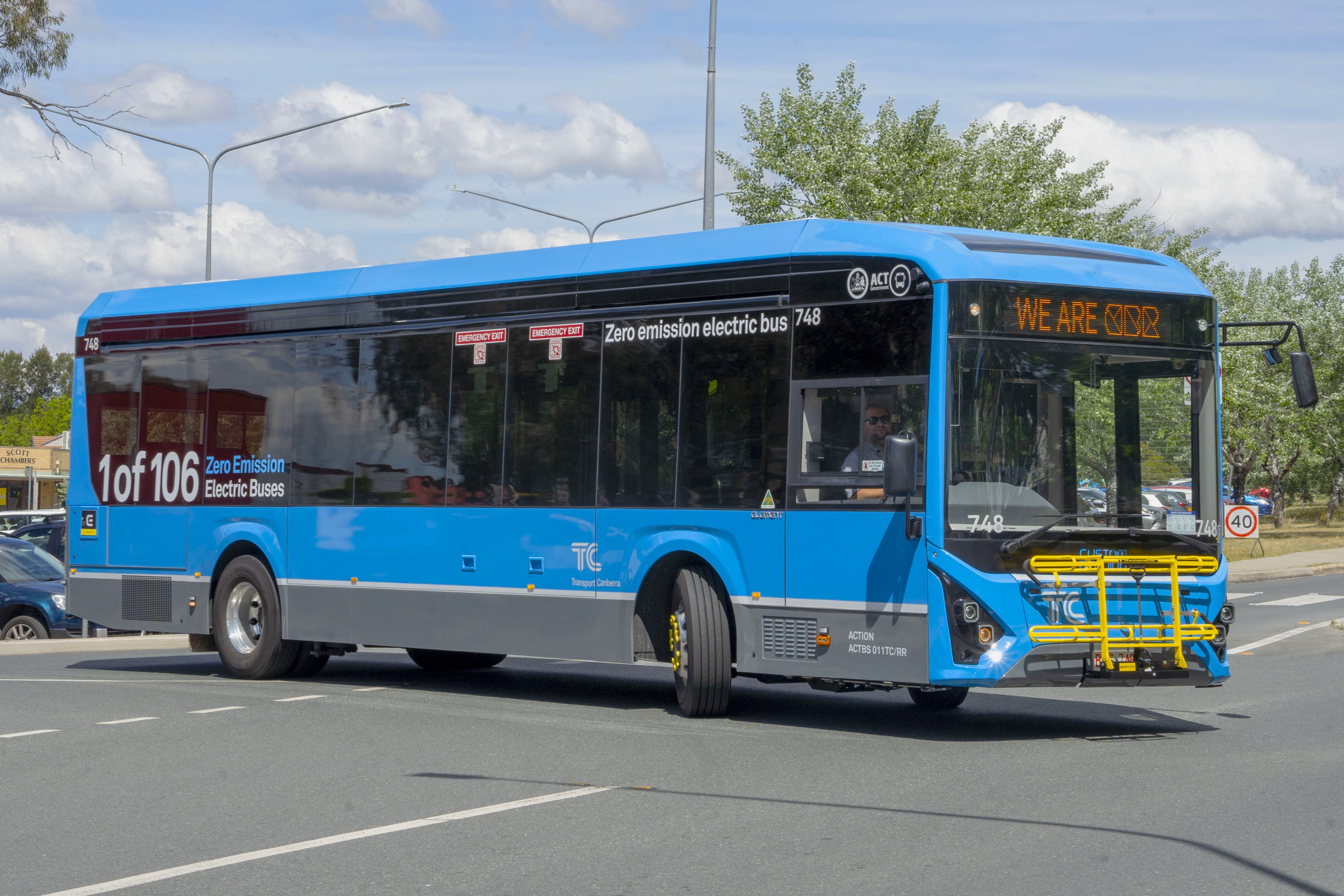
- A Custom Denning Element operated by ACTION Canberra in November 2024
- Industry: Bus manufacturing
- Founded: 1935
- Founder: Stanley Hillsdon
- Headquarters: St Marys
- Key people: Scott Dunn (Managing Director) Daniel Bale (Head of Operations).
- Revenue: $80 million (2012)
- Website: www.customdenning.com.au

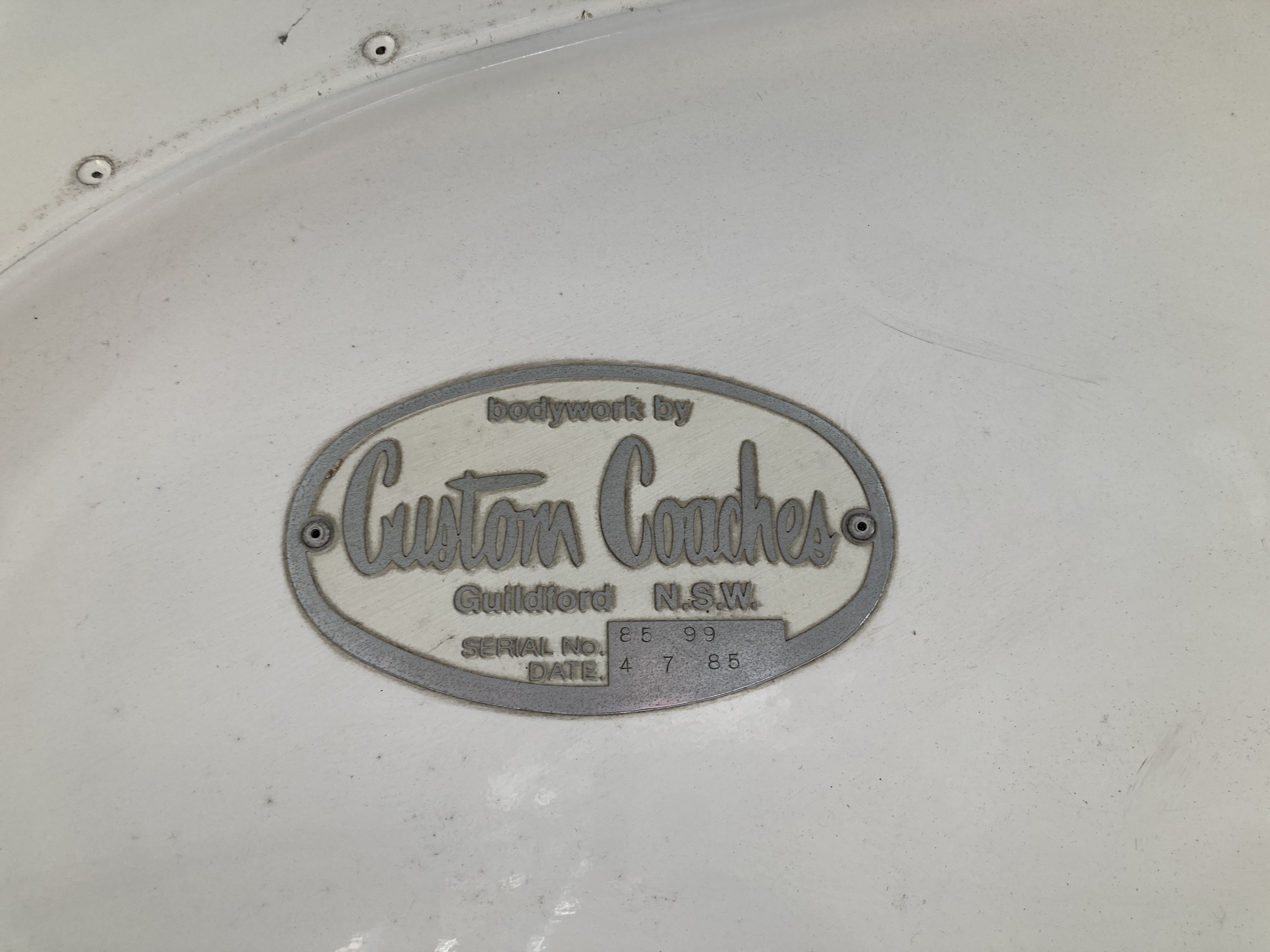
A Custom Coaches manufacturer plate dated July 1985 inside a former Harris Park Transport Volvo B10M

Custom Denning (previously Custom Bus and Custom Coaches) is an Australian bus body builder based in St Marys, New South Wales.

== History ==
=== Cycle Components Manufacturing Company ===
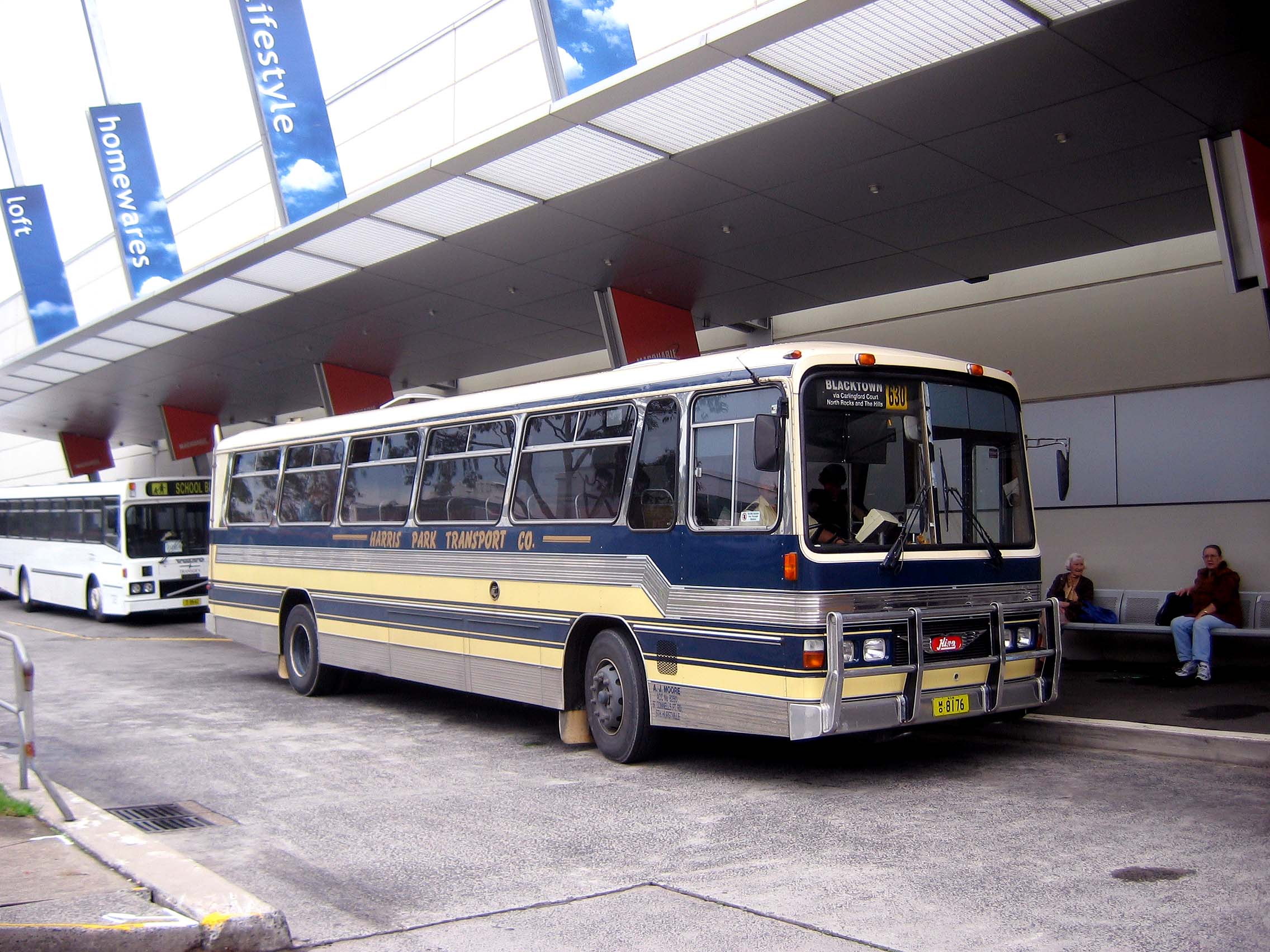
Harris Park Transport Hino CM277 bodied in 1990 seen in October 2004

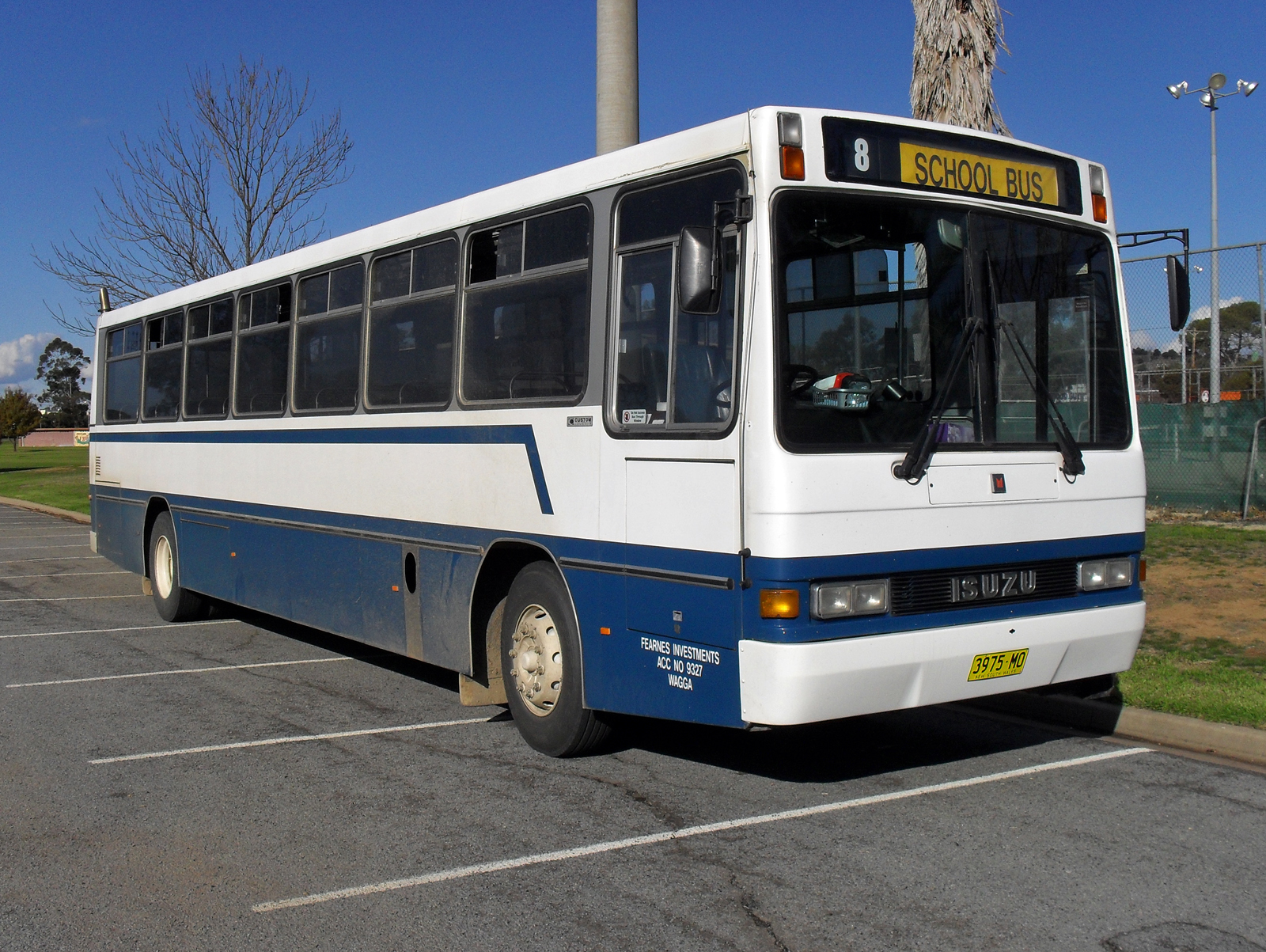
Busabout Wagga Wagga Isuzu LT1-11P bodied in 1994 seen in June 2009

In 1935, Stanley Hillsdon founded Cycle Components Manufacturing Company (CCMC) in Guildford, having been involved in manufacture of bicycles since 1911. In 1946 the company won the contract to manufacture reversible seats for Sydney's tram system.

In 1955, CCMC successfully tendered to body 125 single deck Leyland Royal Tiger Worldmaster buses for the NSW Department of Government Transport. In May 1956, Jack Violet, Hillsdon's nephew by marriage, was employed as Bus Divisional Manager to oversee operations. In April 1958, CCMC bodied their first bus for a private operator, a Leyland Comet for Rowes Bus Service.

Apart from six MAN SL200 and SG192s bodied for ACTION in 1982/82 as part of a contracted included when Smithfield Bus & Coach Works was purchased and 19 Scania K112TR coaches bodied for the State Rail Authority in 1985/86, CCMC built bodies exclusively for private operators after the completion of the Leyland Worldmaster contract for the next 37 years.

=== Custom Coaches Manufacturing Company ===
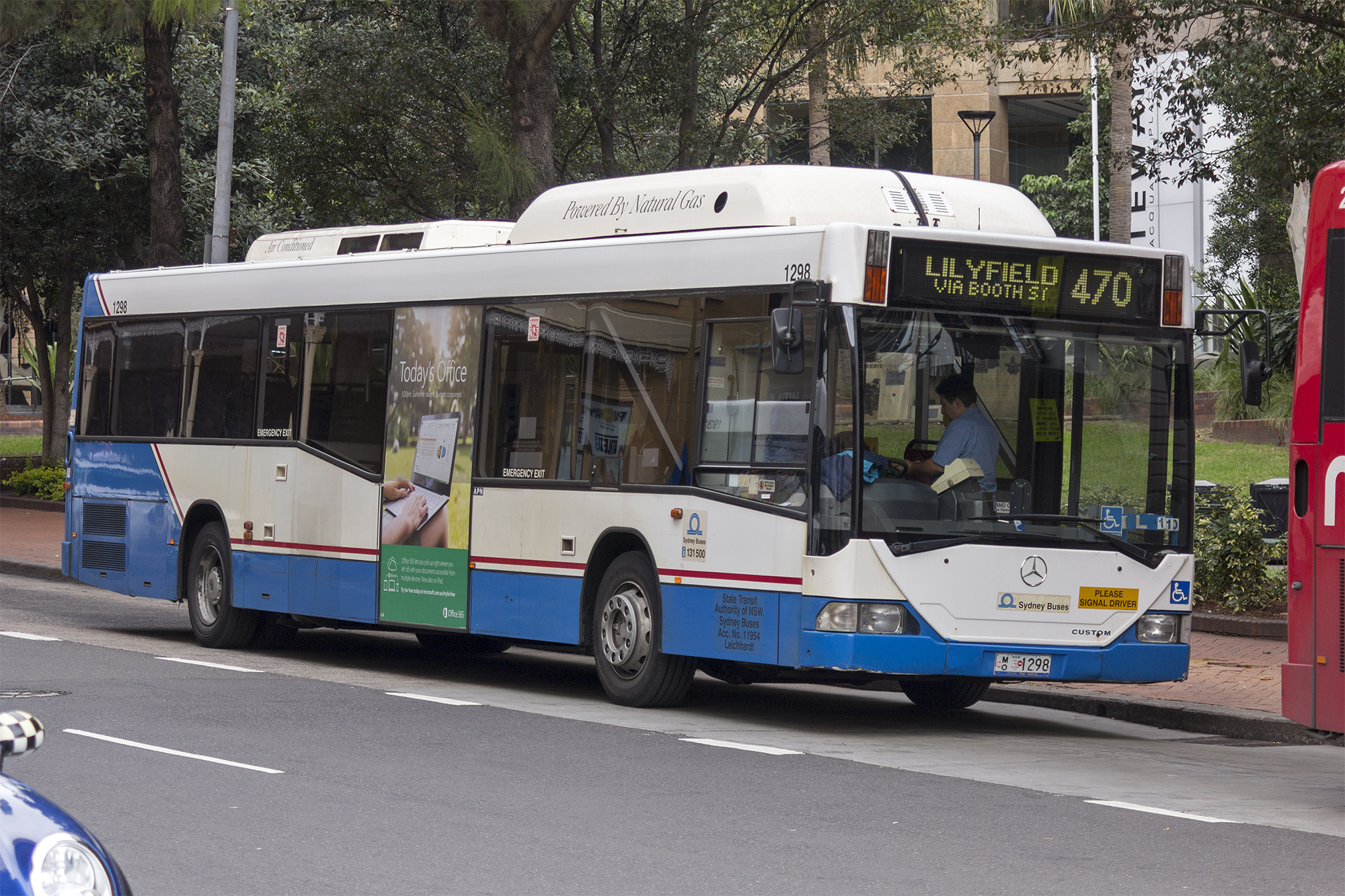
One of STA's Mercedes O405 Custom Citaro vehicles.

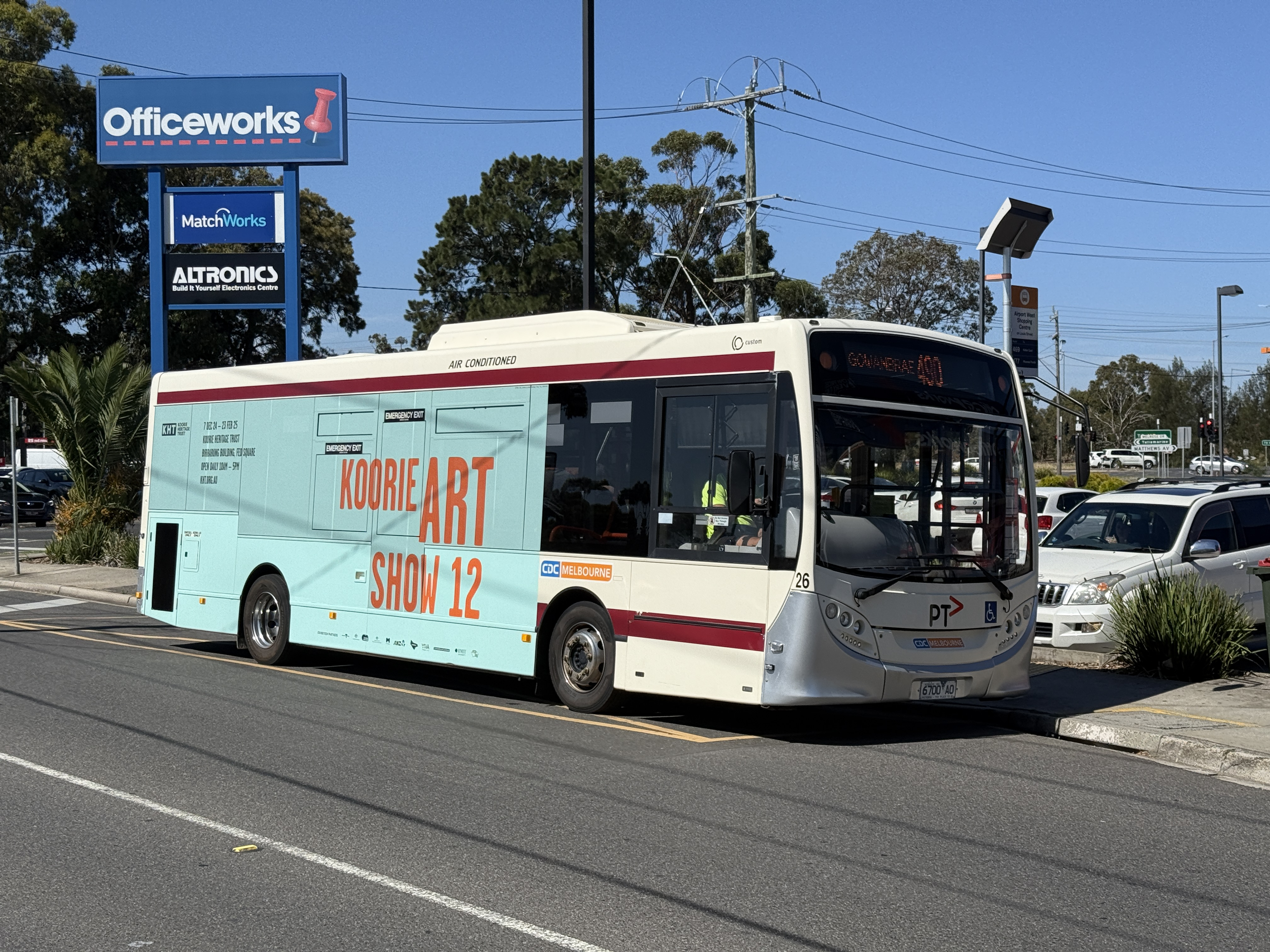
A Custom Coaches Enviro200 bus assembled during Alexandar Dennis ownership

In 1962, control of CCMC passed from Hillsdon to Violet. At some point, the business was renamed Custom Coaches Manufacturing Company, upon the suggestion of Kathleen Metcalfe, sister-in-law of Violet and niece of Hillsdon and wife of Ray Metcalfe, another employee, in order to maintain the CCMC initials. In May 1981, the Smithfield Bus & Coach Works business was purchased from the Bosnjak family. Custom Coaches concentrated on bodying buses for the private sector. In 1967, CCMC entered into an agreement with Melbourne bodybuilder WA Newnham & Sons for CCMC to provide frames and other components. CCMC also supplied components to Brisbane bodybuilder Watt Brothers in the 1960s and Perth's Howard Porter in the 1970s.

In 1988, CCMC purchased WA Newnham & Sons with the business renamed Newnham Custom. In 1995, a plant was opened at Arundel on the Gold Coast. Newnham Custom closed in 2001 with production transferred to Adelaide.

In 1997, Mercedes-Benz, along with Custom Coaches as a sub-contractor, was awarded a contract by the Government of New South Wales to supply 300 ultra low floor CNG-powered uses for the State Transit Authority. As a result, in 1998, Custom Coaches began bodying the new buses for State Transit after a break of over 37 years. The bodies became known as the Custom Coaches' Citaro bodies, assembled on the Mercedes-Benz O405NH CNG chassis. Custom Coaches continued to body buses for State Transit beyond the Mercedes-Benz contract, and by April 2013, over 1,280 had been bodied for the government operator.

In 2000, Australian Bus Manufacturing (ABM) in Adelaide was purchased. It had been formed in 1999 when a consortium of CCMC, Jim Bosnjak and John Hewson purchased the PMC Australia business following the collapse of Clifford Corporation. Australian Bus Manufacturing was rebranded as Custom Coaches in 2004.

In late 2001, Custom Care was established as a bus refurbishment operation.

In 2002, Mark Burgess, a great-nephew of Hillsdon by marriage, became CEO of the company. He, his brother Paul and a long-term business partner, Chris Absalom, completed the purchase of the business from Jack Violet in 2005.

In July 2008, New South Wales bus operator ComfortDelGro Cabcharge (CDC) planned to venture into the bus building industry, and entered a memorandum of understanding to acquire Custom Coaches. In late August that year, CDC announced it would not proceed with the planned acquisition of Custom Coaches. Cabcharge stated that "given the current world economic situation", CDC decided they "should not proceed with this (bus building) business in Australia", and they would "focus on their core operations". To demonstrate their "confidence in Custom Coaches", CDC placed a significant number of new orders with Custom Coaches.

In 2008, production exceeded 400 buses per year, and by 2009 the total number of buses bodied had exceeded 15,000. In May 2010, the Sydney plant moved to new premises in Villawood and in June 2012 the company was purchased by British bus manufacturer Alexander Dennis. Custom Coaches was placed in administration in May 2014. On 15 August 2014, the business was purchased back by Mark Burgess and Allegro Funds and the company was renamed Custom Bus. The Royal Park, South Australia plant closed down in September 2014.

=== Dunn ownership ===
In February 2018, Custom Bus was again placed in administration, resulting in the sacking of 122 staff. The following month, Dunn Group purchased Custom Bus, and in May 2018, relocated its factory to St Marys. A year later, in June 2019, Custom Bus completed its 100th bus under Dunn ownership. In September 2019, Custom Bus acquired Denning Manufacturing, but the latter's branding and operations will be retained.

In February 2021, they announced the production of their first electric bus under the Custom Denning brand, the Element, which is now in production.

== Products ==
=== 420 ===
The 420 is a heavy-duty coach designed for high mileage operation and sustained use in demanding Australian conditions. It is suitable for a range of applications, including urban and regional services, tour operations, charter work, special events, and airport transfers.

The vehicle features a wide entrance and large windows to improve passenger access and visibility. Interior design focuses on passenger comfort, while the driver’s area is configured to allow straightforward entry and exit. The coach is also equipped with high-capacity luggage compartments to support long-distance and airport operations.

=== 510 ===
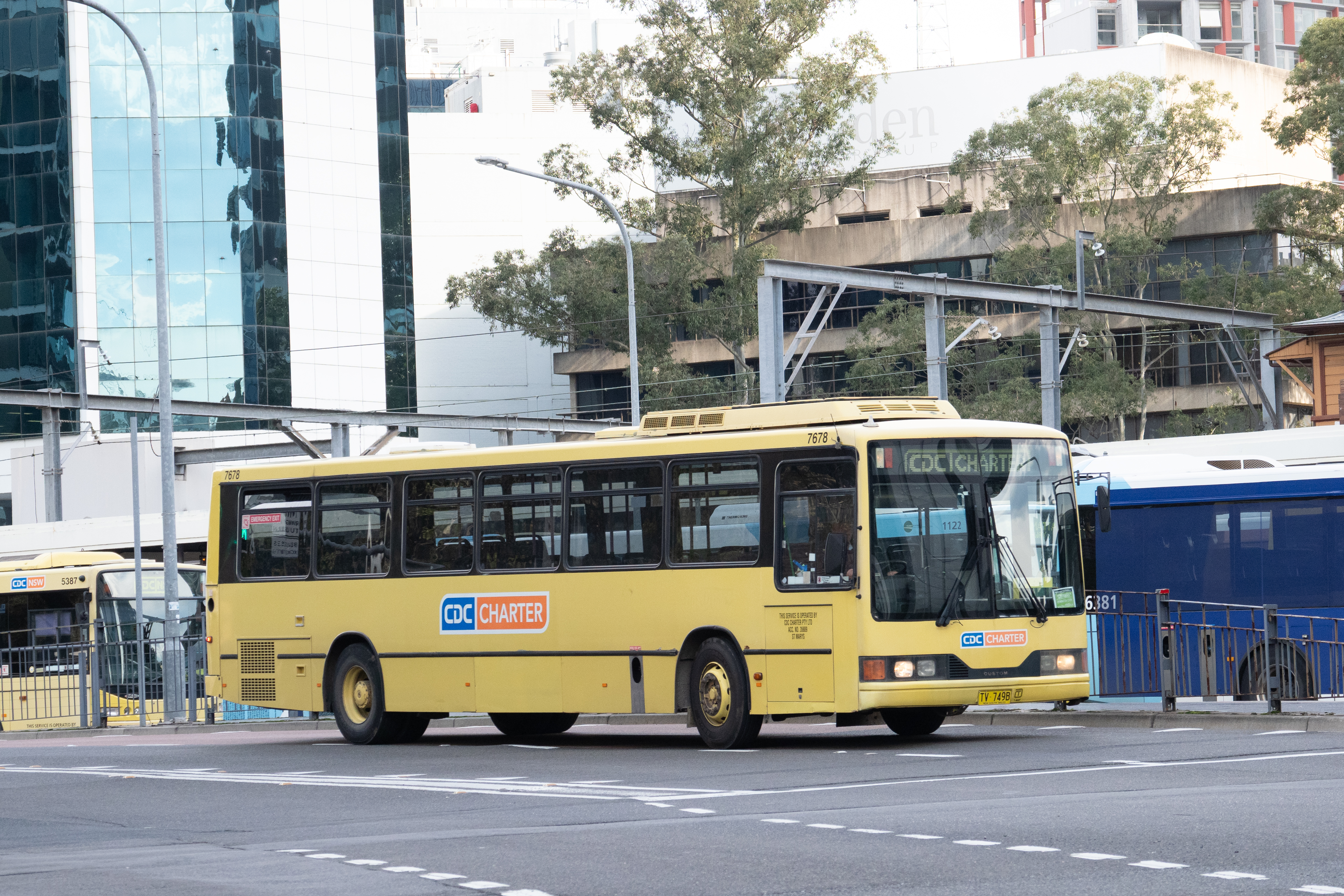
A Custom Coaches 510 bodied Mercedes-Benz O405 operated by CDC Charter, St Marys on WSU Shuttle Bus at Parramatta.

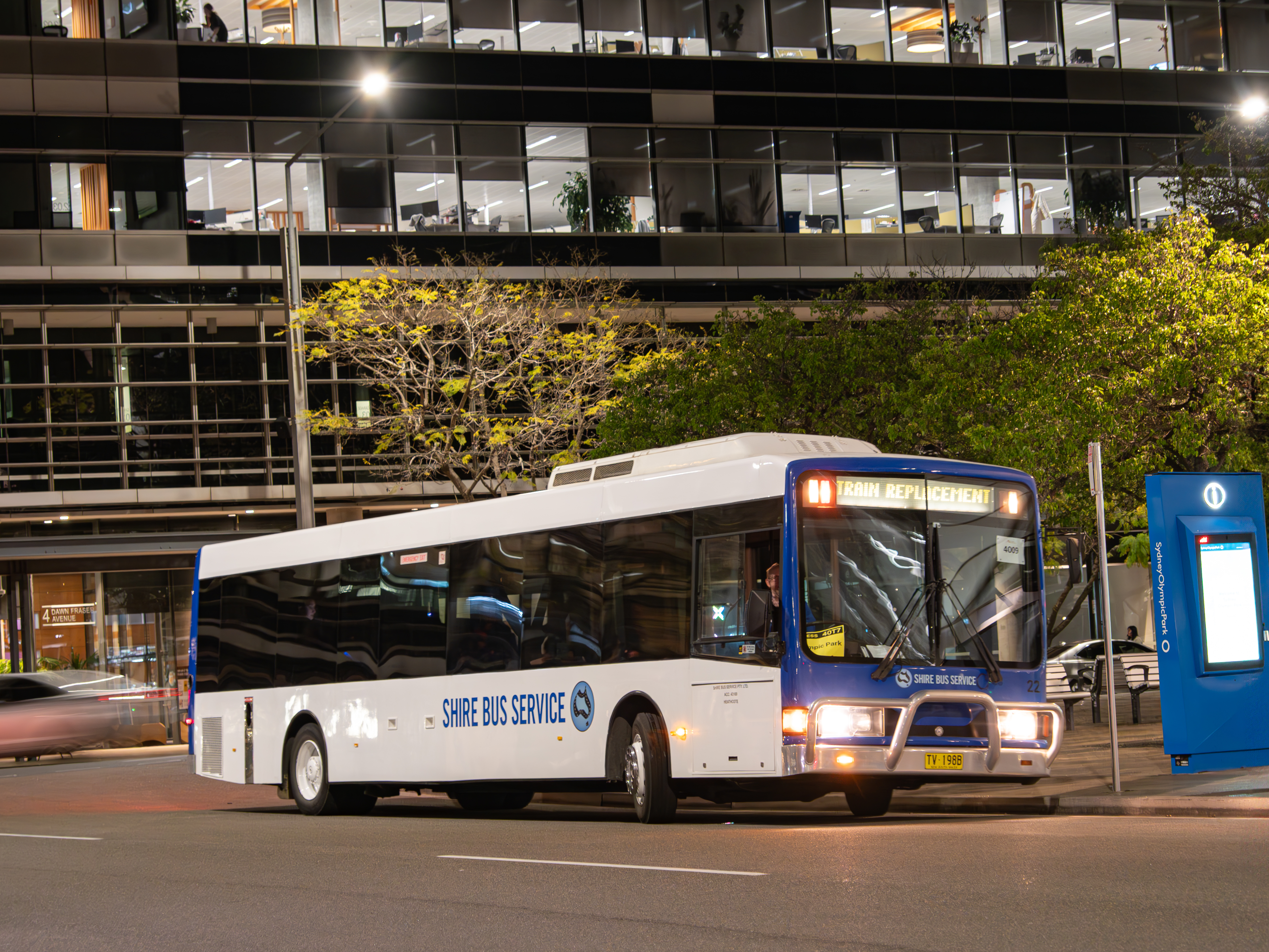
A Custom Coaches 510 bodied Mercedes-Benz O405NH operated by Shire Bus Service on Sydney Trains T7 replacement Service at Olympic Park.

The 510 is a bus body built by Custom Coaches. It features a front headlight design similar to Neoplan, and it is available in both high-floor and low-entry configurations.

In Sydney, Hillsbus have a sizeable fleet of Mercedes-Benz O405 high-floor city bus with Custom Coaches 510 bodywork. However, because of Disability Discrimination Act (DDA) requirements, these buses are limited to charters and school specials only. Some of these vehicles have been transferred to CDC Charter, St Marys, where they have been re-registered on Tourist Vehicle (TV) plates. Busways also operated Mercedes-Benz O405 high-floor city buses with Custom Coaches 510 bodywork, which were formerly owned by King Brothers. In addition, operators such as Harris Park Transport and Baxter's Bus Lines also operated buses with various chassis fitted with the Custom Coaches 510 body.

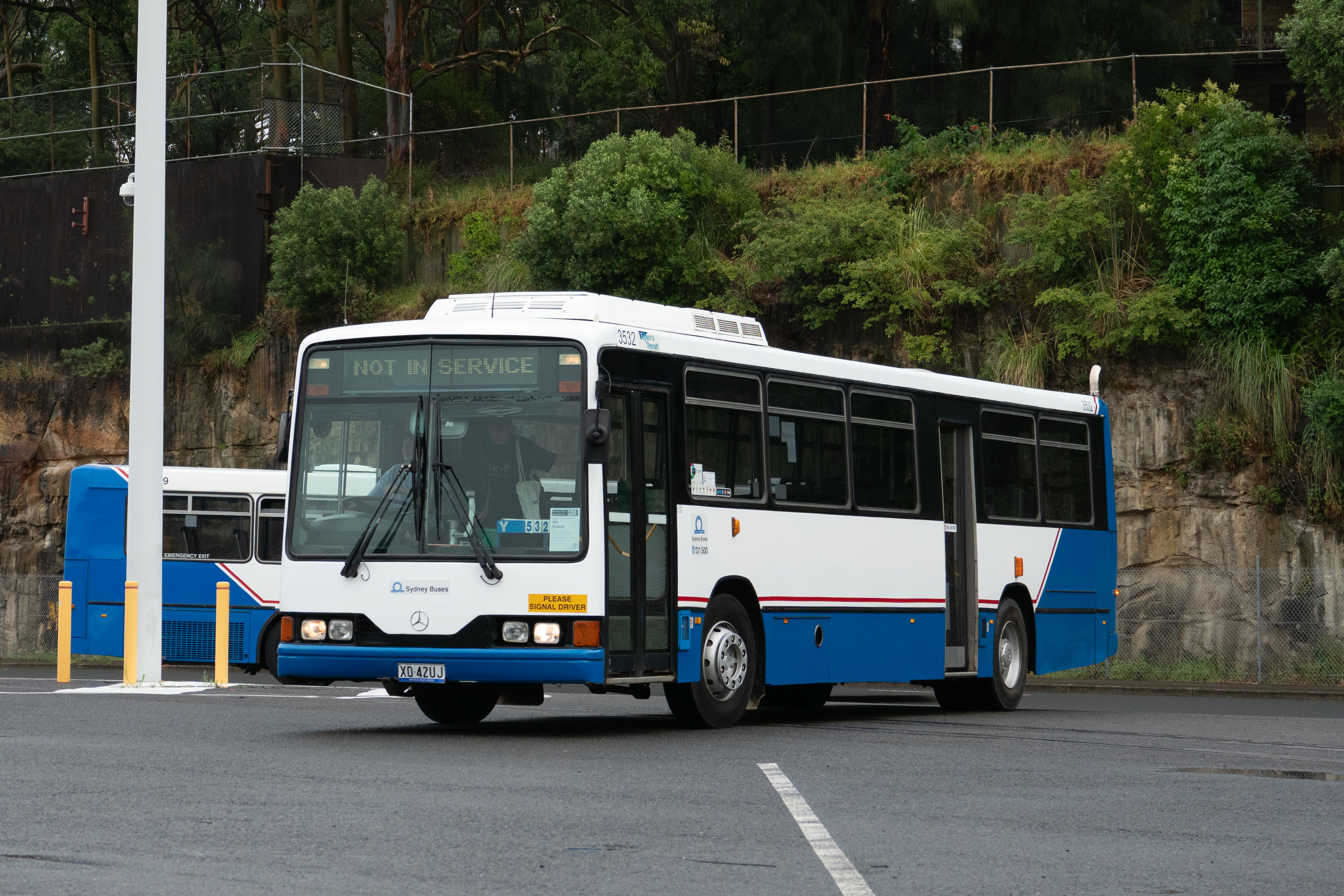
A Custom Coaches 516 bodied Mercedes-Benz O405 formerly operated by North & Western Bus Lines and State Transit Authority, and now privately preserved.

=== 516 ===
The 516 is a bus body produced by Custom Coaches. It was visually similar to the Custom Coaches 510, but differed in having flat windscreens.

In Sydney, North & Western Bus Lines ordered four Mercedes-Benz O405 buses with Custom Coaches 516 bodywork in April 1998. The vehicles passed to the State Transit Authority in 1999, and later to Busways North West following the Region 7 takeover on 9 January 2022.

=== 550 ===
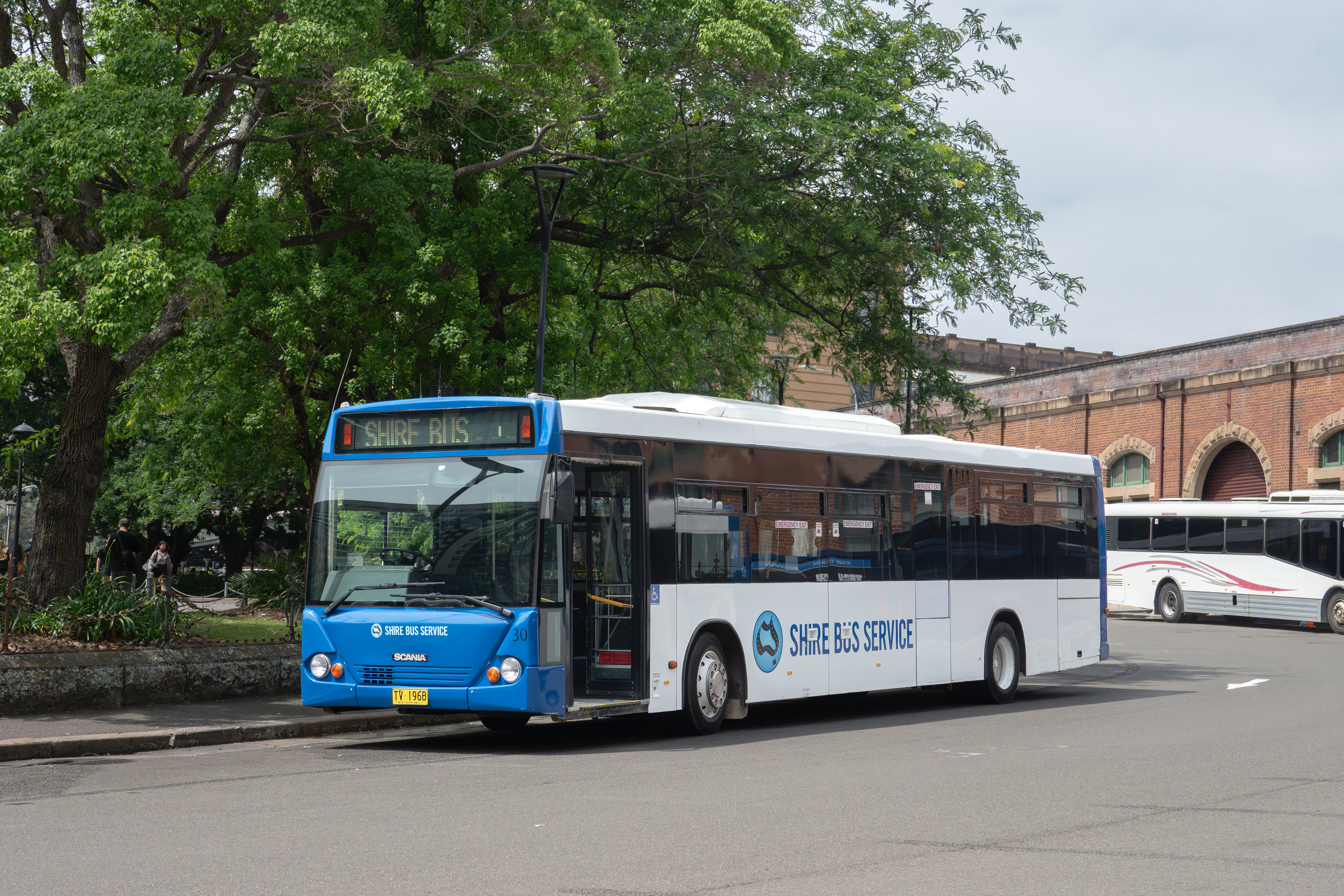
A Custom Coaches 550 bodied Scania L113CRL operated by Shire Bus Service at Central.

The 550 is a bus body built by Custom Coaches for low-entry chassis.

In Sydney, Busways still operates one Mercedes-Benz O405NH with Custom Coaches 550 bodywork as of April 2026, and previously operated two others of the same type. Some charter operators have also operated buses with Custom Coaches 550 bodywork, with a small number remaining in use.

=== CB20 ===
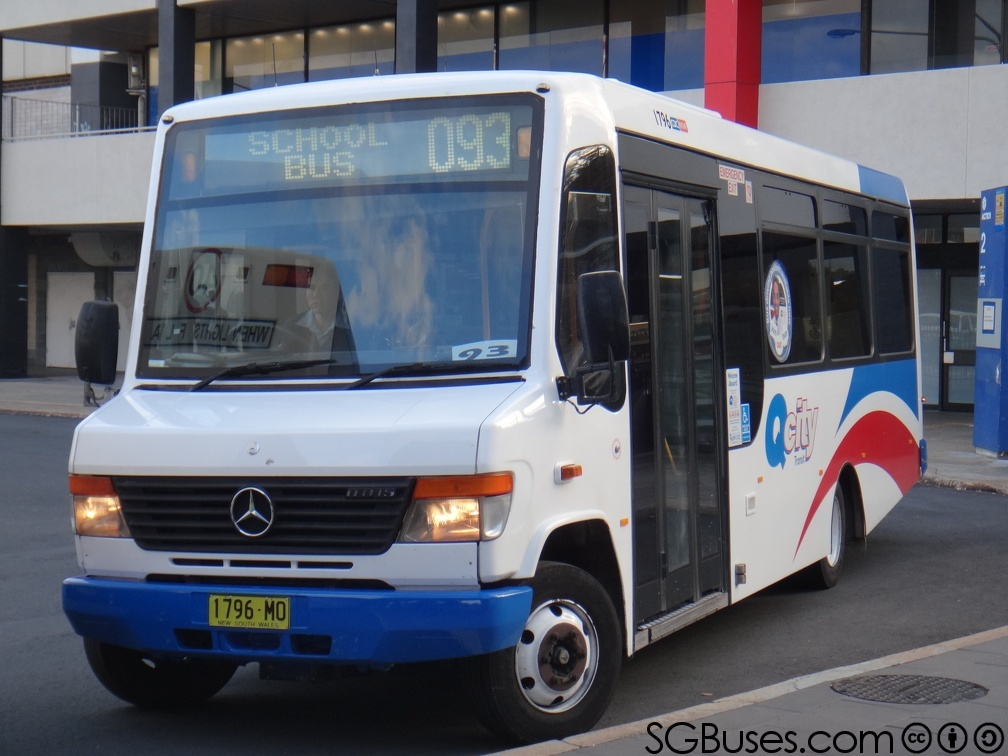
A CB20 bodied Mercedes-Benz Vario operated by Qcity Transit

The CB20 is a minibus body built by Custom Coaches at its Queensland facility on a Mercedes-Benz 815D chassis with an automatic transmission. The model was developed as a cost-effective solution to meet Disability Discrimination Act (DDA) accessibility requirements.

The vehicle incorporates a wheelchair-accessible position located at the front entrance, with adjacent fold-down seating. The remainder of the passenger saloon is accessed via a raised step behind the entry area.

Due to its compact dimensions, the CB20 is suited to operation in narrow streets and densely built urban environments, and is typically used for community transport and local service applications.

Busabout had two examples in its fleet, but are now withdrawn.

=== CB30 ===
The Custom CB30 was available as both an 11m midibus and a 12.5m full sized bus. The CB30 comes in a variety of configurations from 30 to 42 seats. CDC NSW has a sizeable fleet of MAN 12.220 midibuses with CB30 bodywork while Transdev Melbourne had many full size CB30s with MAN chassis.

The CB20 and CB30 ceased production around 2007 with no replacement vehicles provided.

=== CB50 ===
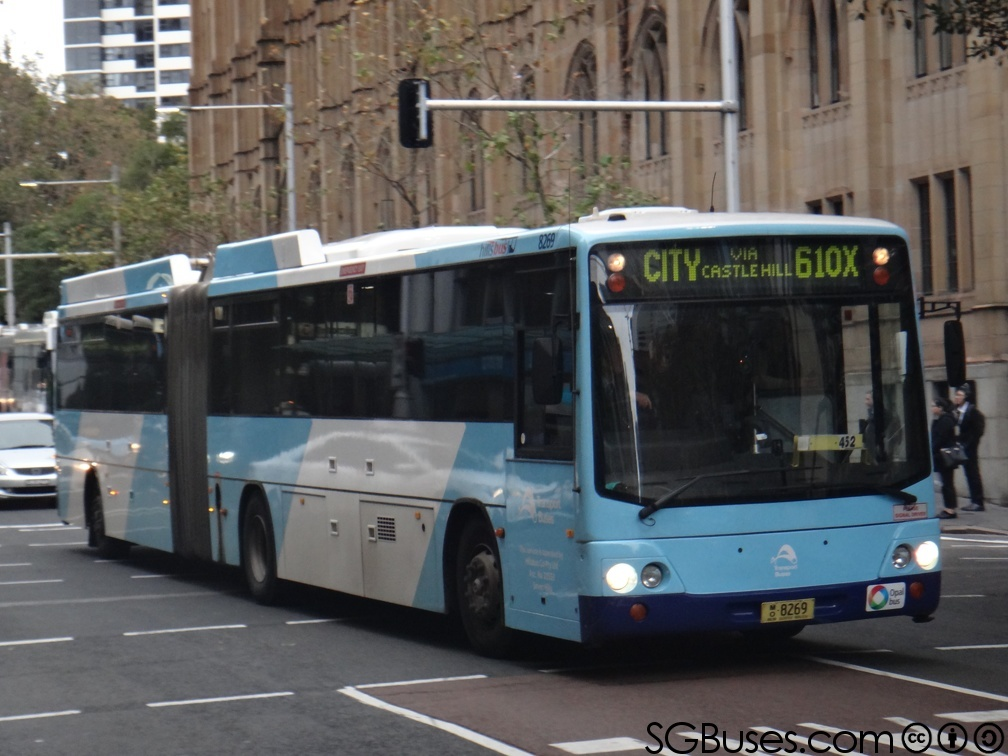
A CB50 bodied Volvo B10MA operated by Hillsbus

The Custom CB50 was in production from 1999 to 2006, replacing the Custom CB30 and the Custom Coaches 550 and being succeeded by the Custom CB60.

There were two variants, the high floor CB50 ordered in small numbers by several operators and the low floor CB50HCL which was more popular, with Premier Motor Service ordering 10 on Volvo B7RLE chassis. The CB50HCL had a window line similar to the Bustech VST.

=== CB60 ===
==== Early versions ====
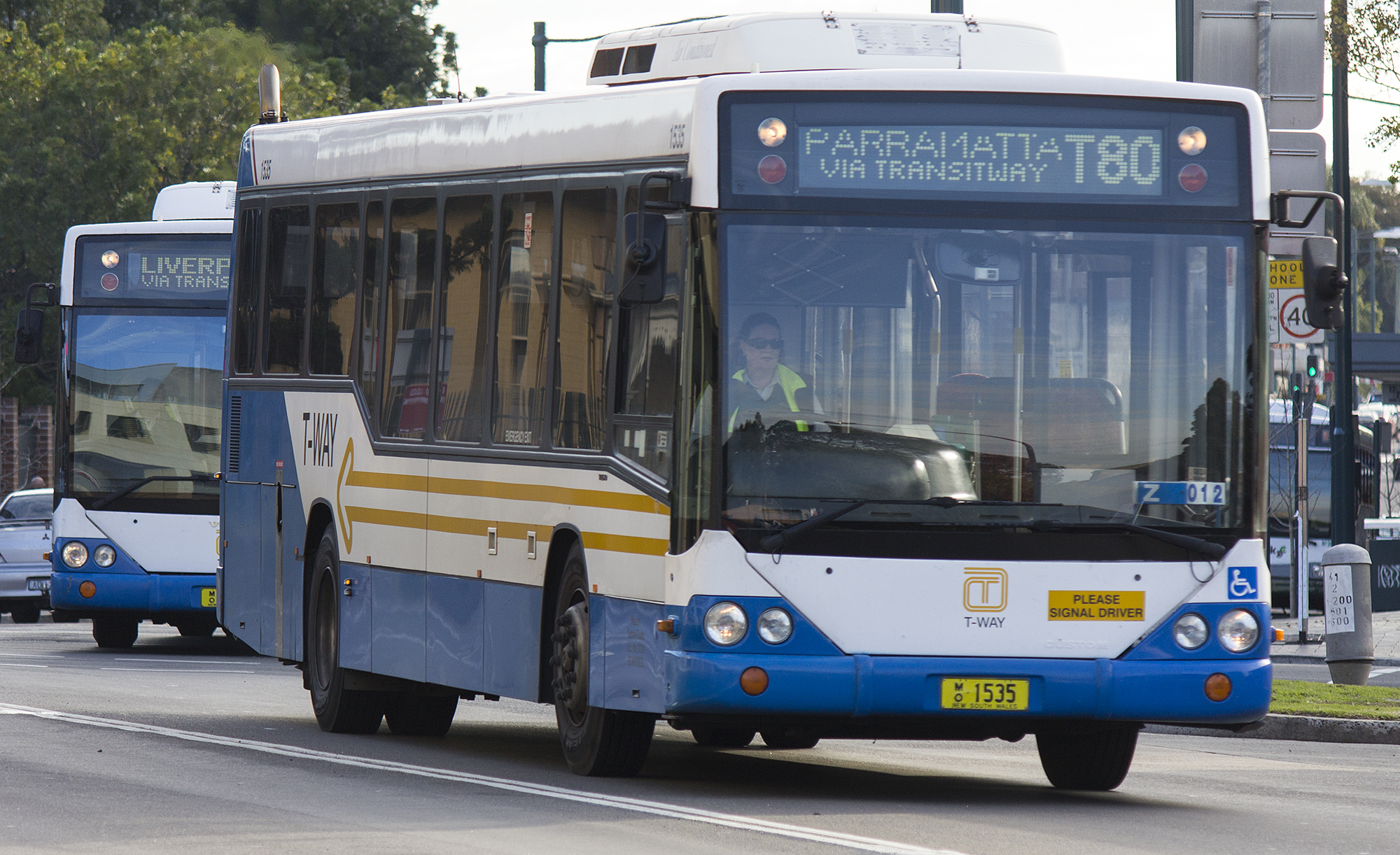
A State Transit Authority Western Sydney Buses Volvo B12BLE Euro 3 Custom Coaches CB60 on the Liverpool-Parramatta T-Way operating a T80 service.

The CB60 was produced between 1999 and 2007 by Custom Coaches and ABM, taking much of its design inspiration from the Custom Coaches Citaro, it replaced the Custom Coaches 550 and was succeeded by the CB60 Evo II. The earliest CB60s featured a one piece front corner/bumper/headlight piece, this was later changed to a two piece design with the front corner/bumper and headlight surround being two separate parts as opposed to one. A third variant was introduced which added additional fog lights to the front corner pieces. These additional fog lights were set into the bumper and located next to the turn signals, with the majority of these being purchased by various operators in Adelaide and by Action Canberra. Busways in New South Wales ordered a fourth variant which separated the front bumpers from the corners and got rid of the three piece bumper design, instead going to a one piece bumper but still retaining the separate headlight surrounds.

ABM produced several slightly modified variants of the CB60 body for Adelaide operators. These were called the CB62A, CB64A, CB60A and CB60 Combo. The first of these was the ABM CB62A, it featured the Custom Coaches Citaro front corners with additional fog lights and front headboard. It was only ever built on MAN NL202 and 232 CNG chassis for Torrens Transit in Adelaide. The ABM CB64A and the ABM CB60A both changed the headboard of the CB60, instead being fitted with the Custom Coaches Citaro headboard and had the front corner pieces with additional fog lights as opposed to the standard corner pieces. The CB64A was only built on MAN 18.320 chassis and the CB60A was built on Scania L94UB chassis and a one off was built on a Mercedes-Benz O405NH chassis, the one off CB60A had a standard CB60 headboard but retained the additional fog light front corner pieces, with all CB64A and CB60A buses being built for Adelaide operators. Following the complete acquisition of ABM by Custom Coaches the Custom Coaches CB60 Combo was introduced. The CB60 Combo, like the CB64A and CB60A was fitted with the Custom Coaches Citaro headboard as opposed to the standard CB60 headboard, it was only offered as an articulated combo floor body and was only ordered by Adelaide operators on Scania L94UA chassis. Other CB60 articulated buses were ordered by State Transit, in Sydney, who placed an order for 80 Volvo B12BLEA Euro 3 articulated buses with standard CB60 bodies.

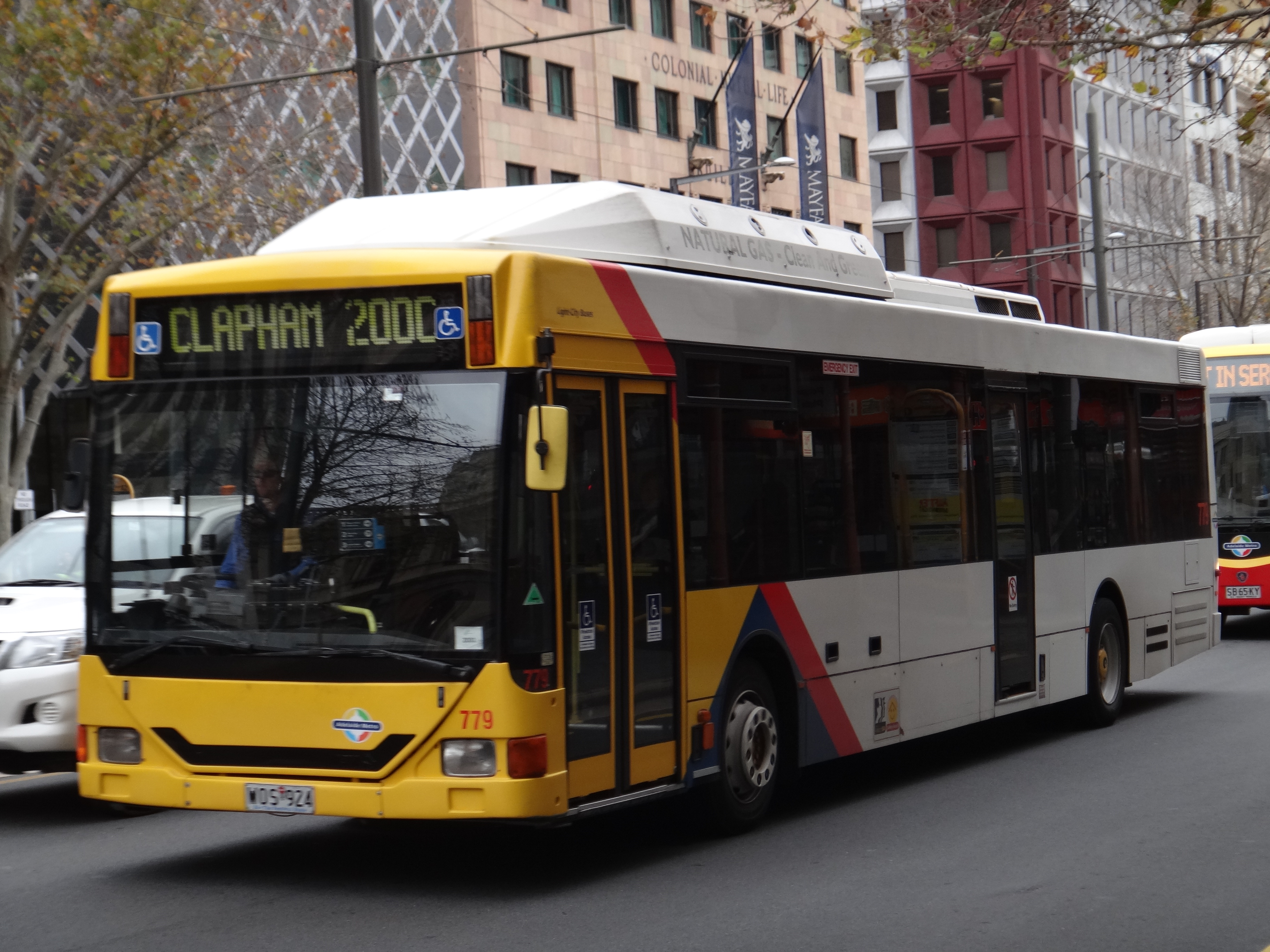
An ABM CB62A.

The Custom CB60 CMAX was produced between 2004 and 2007, it did not have any significant changes from the standard CB60 and was primarily ordered by Ventura in Melbourne (before Transdev) on the Scania L94UB chassis, and by Busways Western Sydney on Scania K230UB Euro 3 chassis.

==== Evo II ====
The CB60 Evo II was introduced in late 2006, it featured a more lightweight body construction, a facelifted front, a slight modification to the rear end and an increased height.

The CB60 Evo II ceased production in 2012, being one of Custom's most popular bodies.

=== CB80 ===
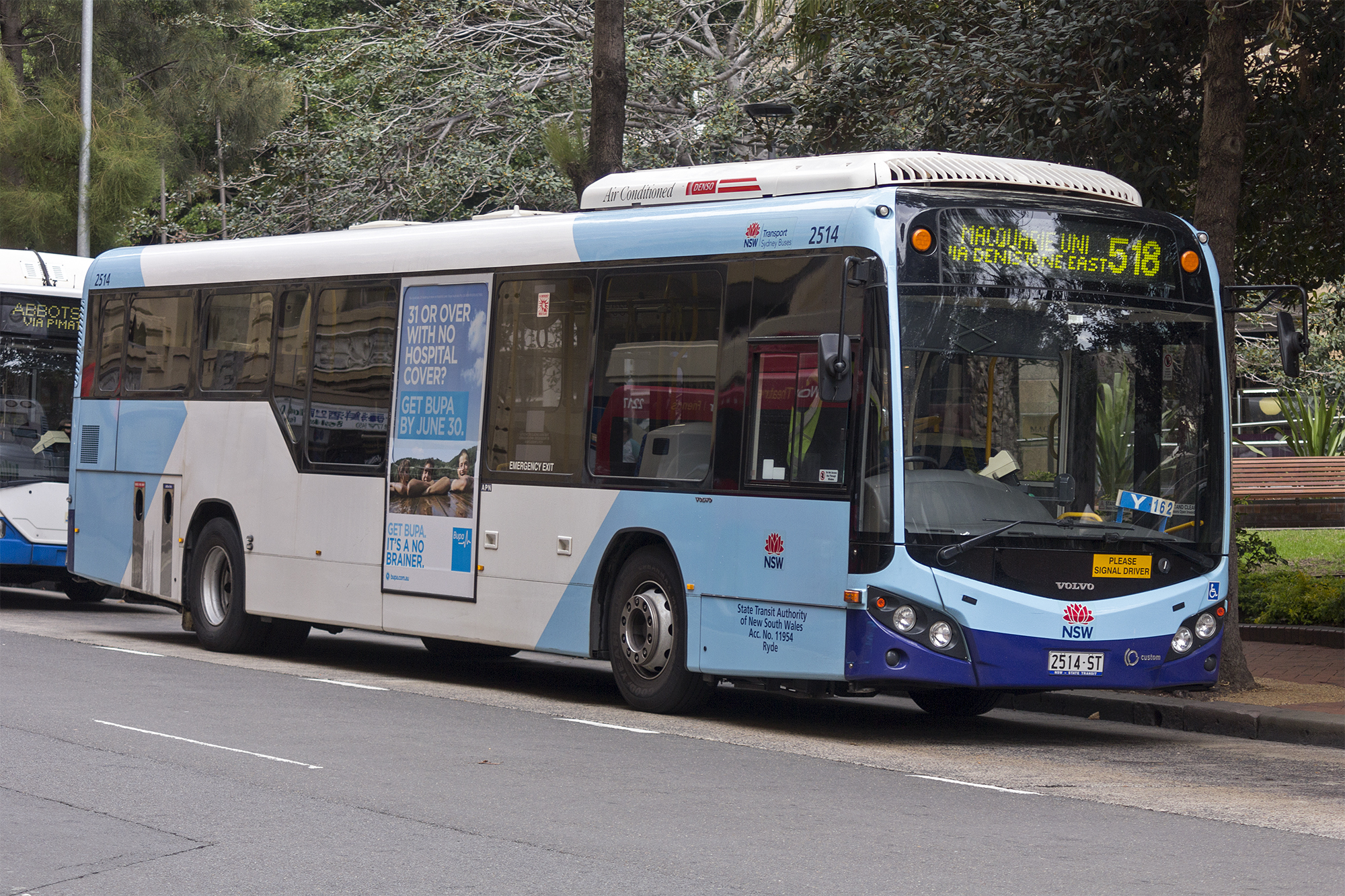
A CB80 bodied Volvo B7RLE operated by the State Transit Authority

The Custom CB80 was first revealed to the public in 2009 as a demonstrator vehicle on Mercedes O500LE chassis, which visited various depots. It was supplied by Mercedes to State Transit as a replacement unit after a Mercedes O500LE CNG Custom Coaches CB60 Evo II was destroyed by fire near Hillsdale. The first batch Custom CB80 was delivered to Ventura (now Kinetic) in 2010 with MAN 18.310 and 18.320 chassis respectively on the smart bus routes. Following privatisation, the demonstrator is now M/O 4878 with Transdev John Holland Buses.

State Transit was the first operator to order the CB80, a batch of 100 on Scania K280UB chassis were delivered in 2011. All vehicles are dual door and in Transport for NSW livery.

The CB80 was designed using 3D modelling. It is still Custom's lightest bus body and has lightweight plastic ducting. Composite materials are used extensively in the bus. It also has several innovative features such as the wireless stop bells, front wheel hump design to maximise seating space and the positioning of the rear engine grilles to maximise advertising space.

==== Series 2 ====
The CB80 Series 2 brought a range of improvements to the original CB80. It came with LED destination displays by default, had improved stop bells (the ones on the original CB80 were notorious for malfunctioning) and other minor differences.

The first CB80 Series 2 vehicles were delivered to State Transit in 2017 on Volvo B7RLE Euro 5 chassis.The CB80 Series 2 ceased production in 2019, being replaced by the Custom Endeavour. The final CB80 was 3120 ST, a Volvo B8RLE Custom CB80 for State Transit built in April 2020.

=== SB30 ===
The SB30 is a mid-size, front-engined school bus body developed by Custom Coaches in partnership with Iveco. It was launched on 1 September 2006 in Adelaide alongside the Iveco Euro Midi MC100 chassis.

The SB30 was designed as a 43-seat, seat-belt-equipped school bus, reflecting increasing regulatory requirements in several Australian states for seat-belted school transport. The body was purpose-built for the Iveco Euro Midi platform and shared structural elements with the larger SB40 model, allowing for component commonality across the manufacturer’s product range.

The vehicle featured a front-end design consistent with Iveco’s truck styling, incorporating a modular front assembly that could be removed to allow access to mechanical and electrical components. Standard body features included a rear luggage compartment, underfloor storage, a forward-mounted single passenger door, and a two-piece flat windscreen.

The SB30 was built on the Iveco Euro Midi chassis, equipped with an Iveco Tector 6.0-litre turbocharged and intercooled inline six-cylinder diesel engine, paired with a six-speed synchromesh transmission. Additional chassis features included four-wheel disc brakes, anti-lock braking system (ABS), electronically controlled air suspension (ECAS), and front underrun protection.

The model was intended for use in school transport operations, particularly in rural or dusty environments, where the front-engine configuration was considered advantageous for maintenance and operating conditions.

=== SB40 ===
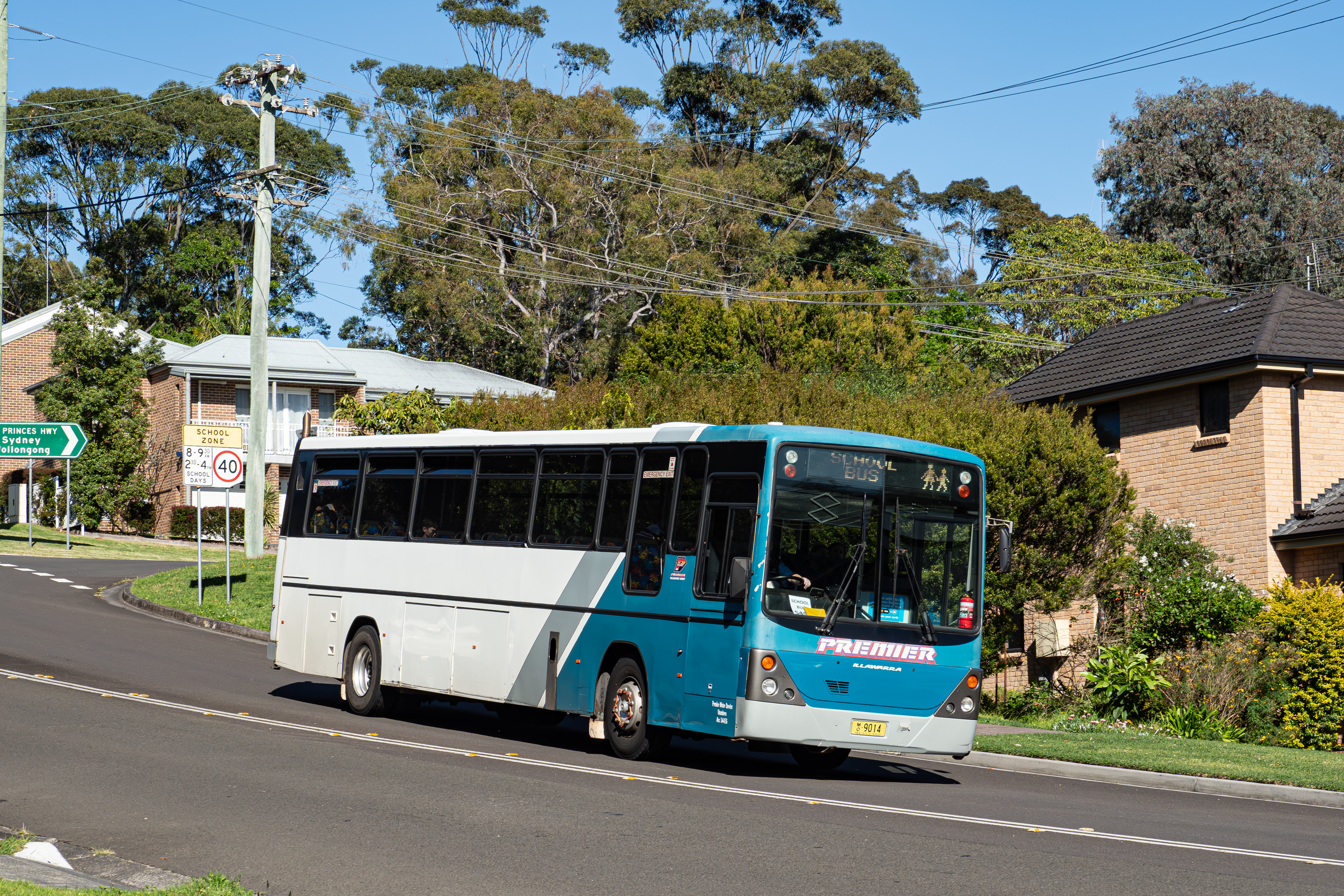
A Custom Coaches SB40 bodied Volvo B7R operated by Premier Illawarra on school bus service at Kiama.

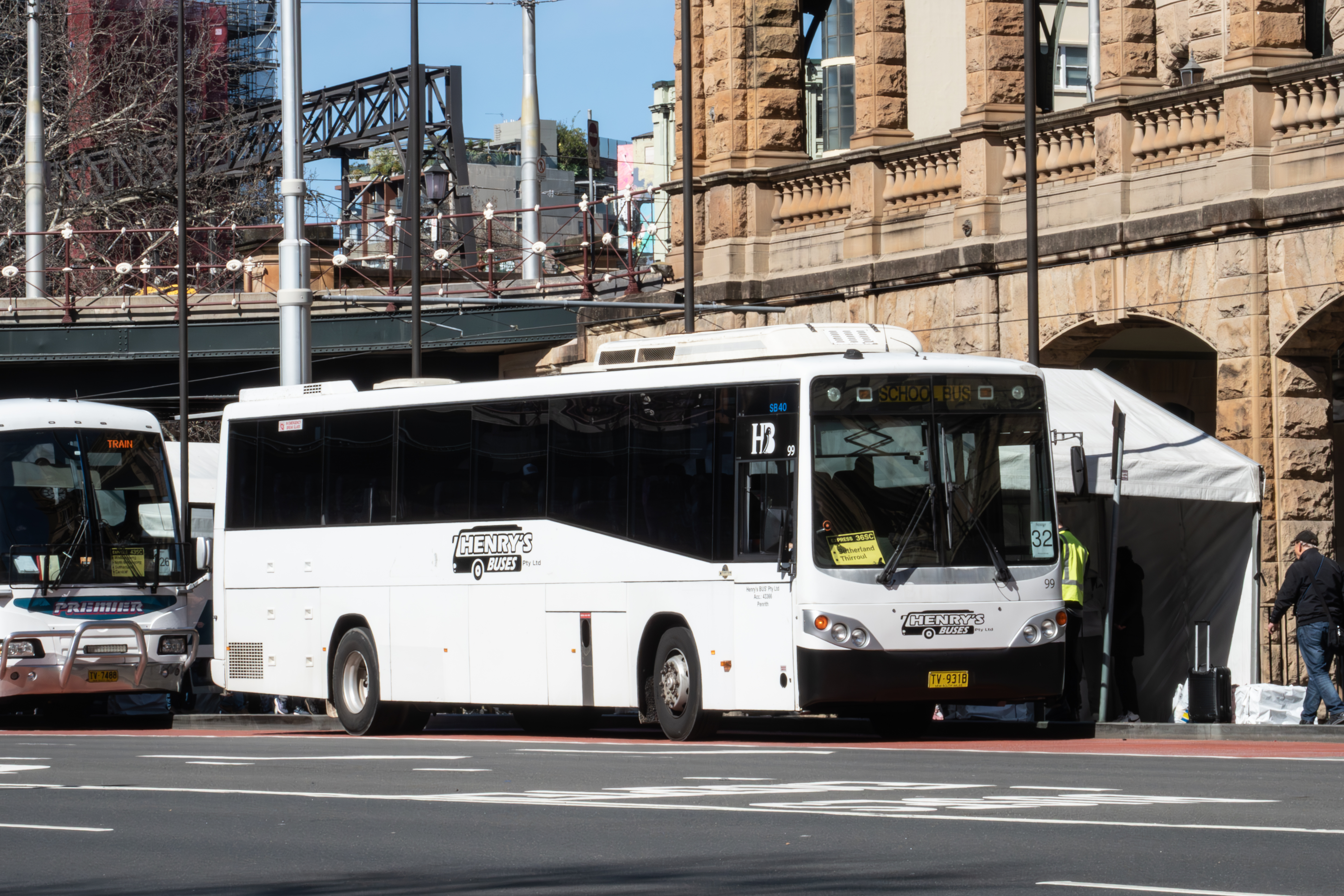
A Custom Coaches SB40 "Starliner" bodied Mercedes-Benz OH1728L operated by Henry's Buses on NSW TrainLink SCO Line replacement at Central.

The SB40 is a multi-purpose bus body produced by Custom Coaches for school, charter, and route service applications.

It has a choice of two front exteriors. (including the Starliner design)

=== SB400 ===
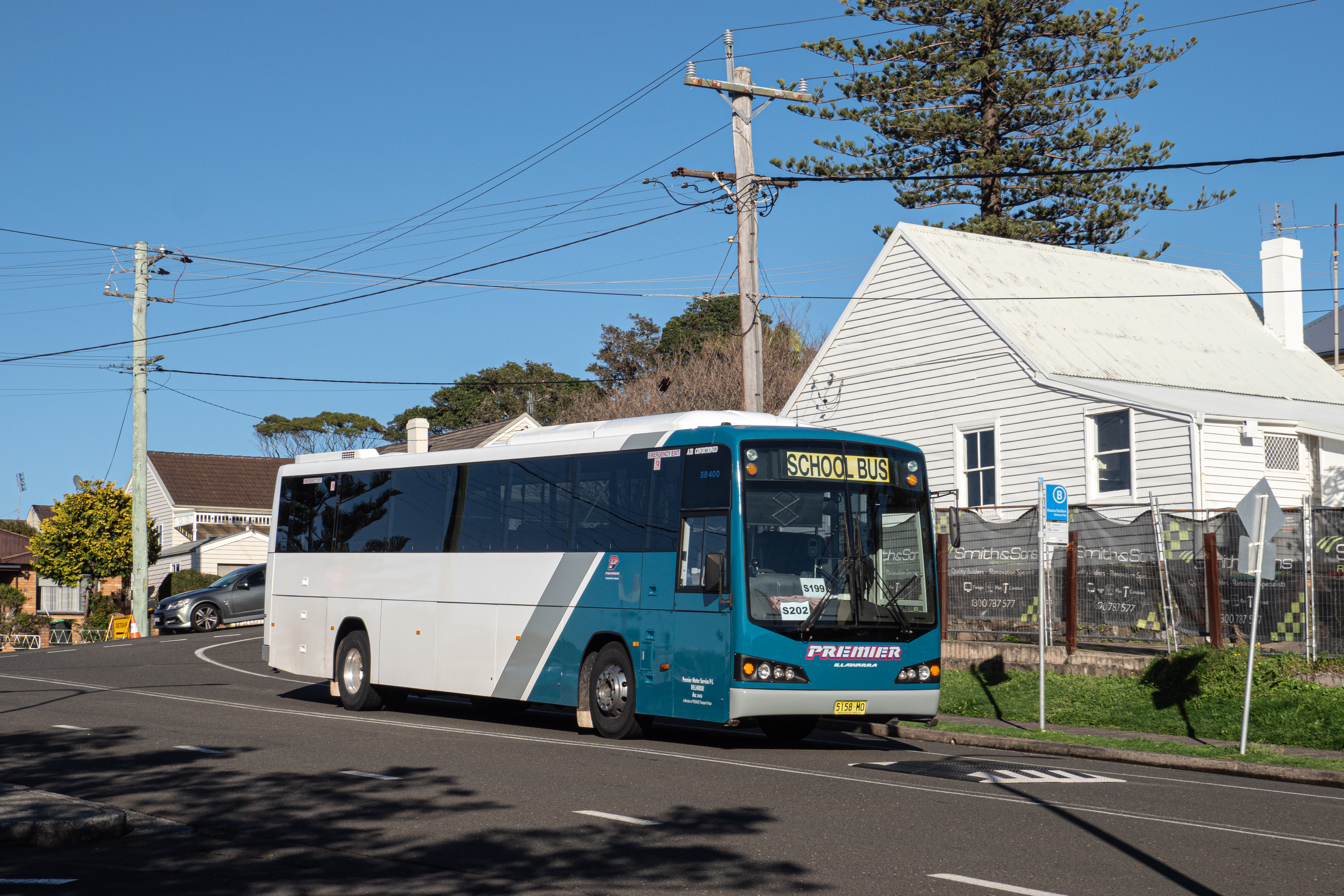
A Custom Coaches SB400 bodied Volvo B7R operated by Premier Illawarra on school bus service at Kiama.

In July 2003, Custom Coaches introduced the SB400, a higher-specification variant of its SB40 school bus. The model featured a coach-style exterior with a curved front design, incorporating a two-piece curved windscreen and integrated headlight cluster.

The driver’s area was designed with an automotive-style dashboard, including a wraparound layout and soft-touch materials. Features such as overhead storage, air-conditioning and fresh-air vents, and a large windscreen were intended to enhance driver visibility and ergonomics.

The SB400 utilised UV-resistant plastics in window and service areas, along with bonded tinted windows. Passenger amenities included individual air-conditioning vents. The model could be specified with or without seat belts, depending on operator requirements. Storage configurations included through bins or side bins.

The first SB400 was constructed with a space frame body and through-bin storage on a Mercedes-Benz OH 1725L chassis. Access hatches on both sides of the vehicle were designed to allow maintenance access to chassis components, while the rear engine bay door provided full access for servicing.

Modifications to the body frame increased passenger capacity by approximately three seats compared with the SB40. The SB400 was designed for compatibility with multiple chassis types and could be manufactured at Custom Coaches’ facilities in Adelaide, Sydney, or Queensland.

=== Endeavour ===
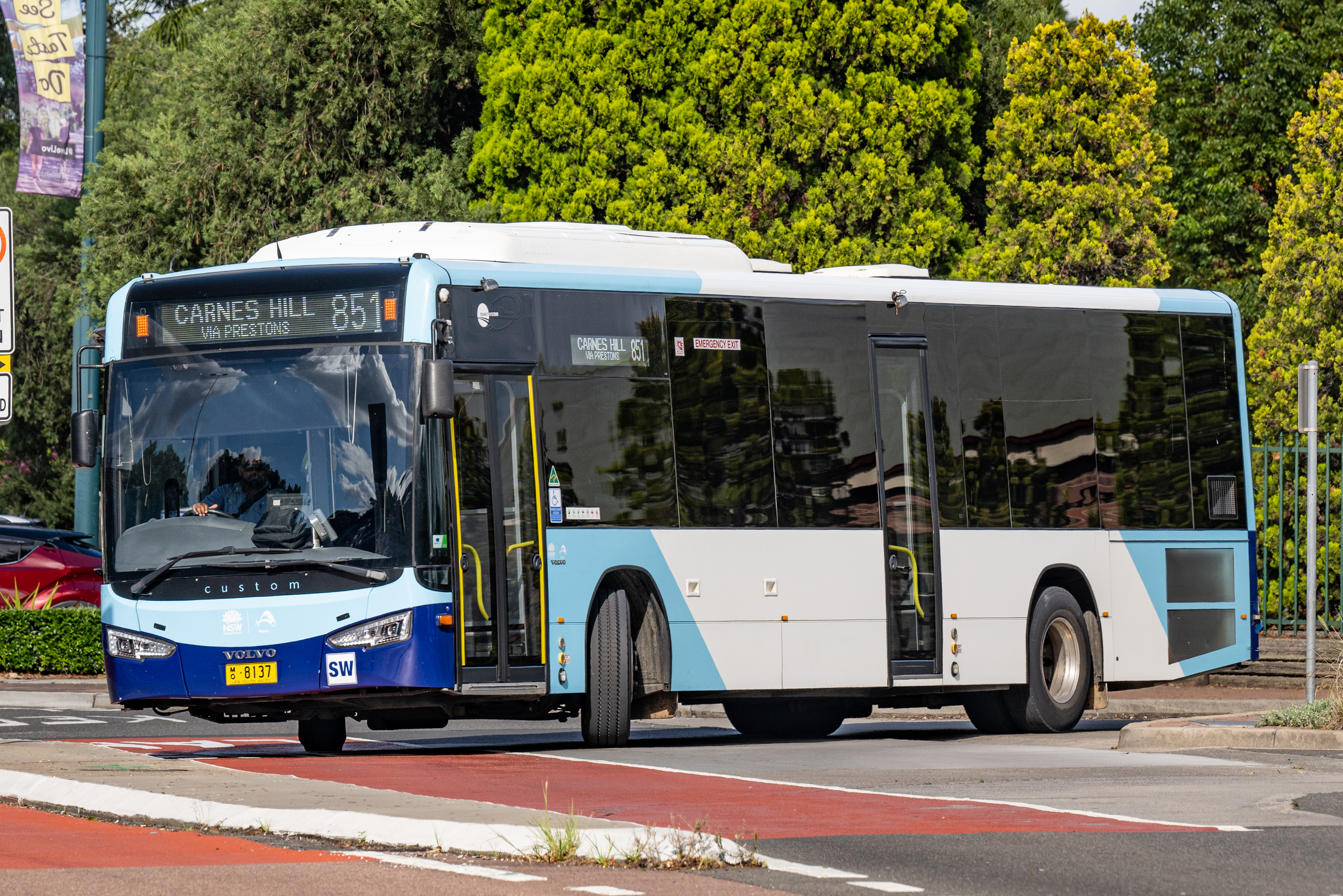
A Custom Denning Endeavour bodied Volvo B8RLE operated by Transit Systems NSW

The Custom Endeavour was launched in early 2020 as a low floor diesel bus that could seat 45 passengers. Though the Endeavour was officially launched in 2020, there were reported sightings since at least October 2019. The Endeavour marked a shift for the Custom Bus company, being the first bus produced entirely under the leadership of Dunn Group. The first Endeavours were built on the Mercedes O500LE chassis, leading to a quieter and smoother ride, and positive reviews from both drivers and passengers.

==== Endeavour One Door ====
The Custom Endeavour One Door is as a single-door version of the Endeavour, with space for 53 seated passengers. The first 5 Endeavour One Doors were built in June 2020 on the Volvo B8RLE chassis for Busabout Wagga Wagga and entered service in July. By the time the One Door entered service, Endeavour buses were operating in Sydney, Brisbane and Regional New South Wales.

==== Endeavour Hybrid ====
The Endeavour Hybrid was introduced in 2023 as an alternative to the Endeavour. The first Endeavour Hybrid was built on the Scania Hybrid chassis in August 2023 for McGinty group, a bus operator that serves much of Victoria. Major Victorian bus operator Ventura Bus Lines ordered 22 Endeavour Hybrid buses using the Scania chassis in 2023.

The Endeavour Hybrid, along with the electric Element bus, have been the centrepieces of the Custom Denning product lineup following the merger of Custom Coaches and Denning Manufacturing in 2019.

=== Element ===
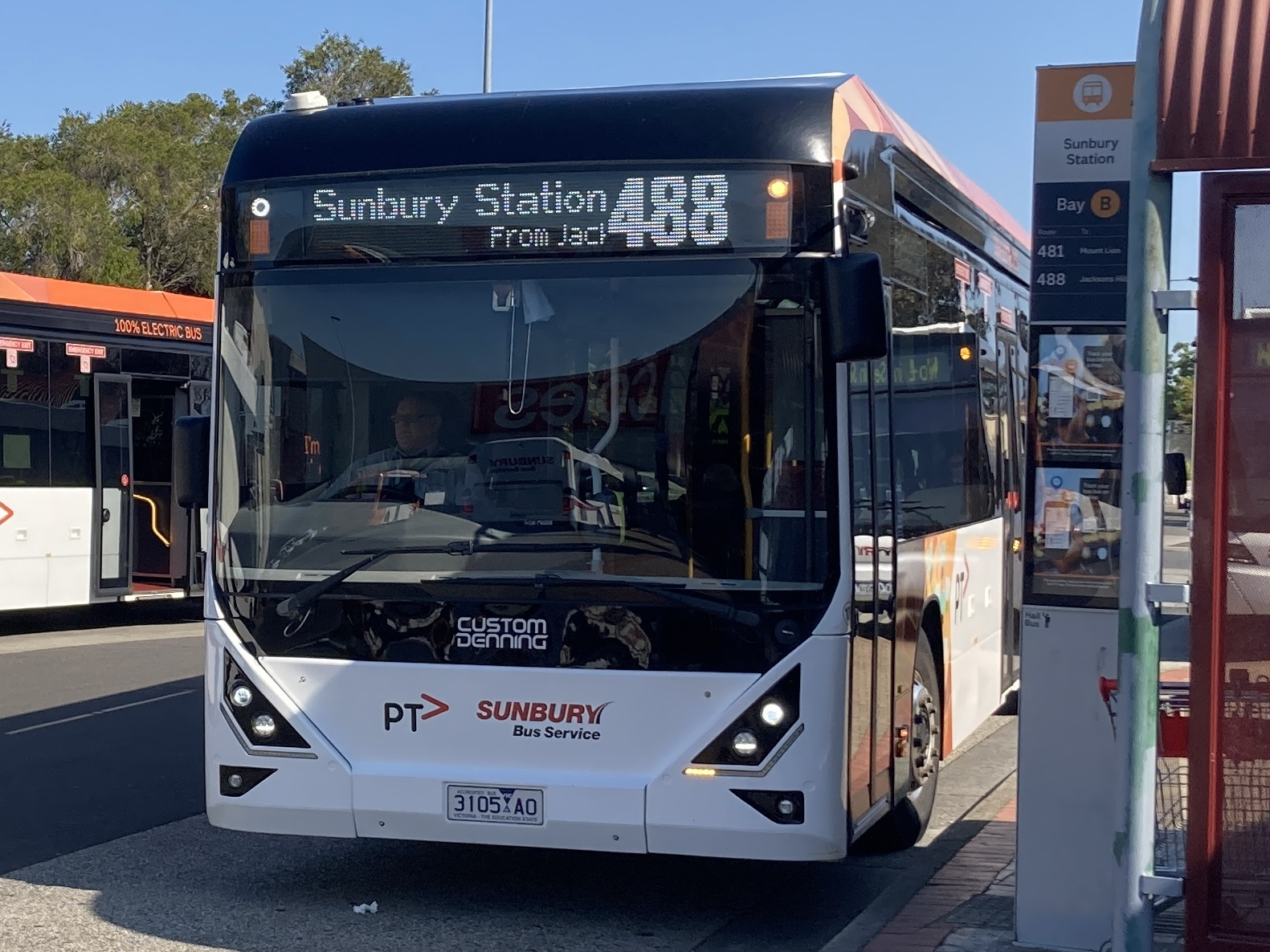
Custom Denning Element operated by Sunbury Bus Service

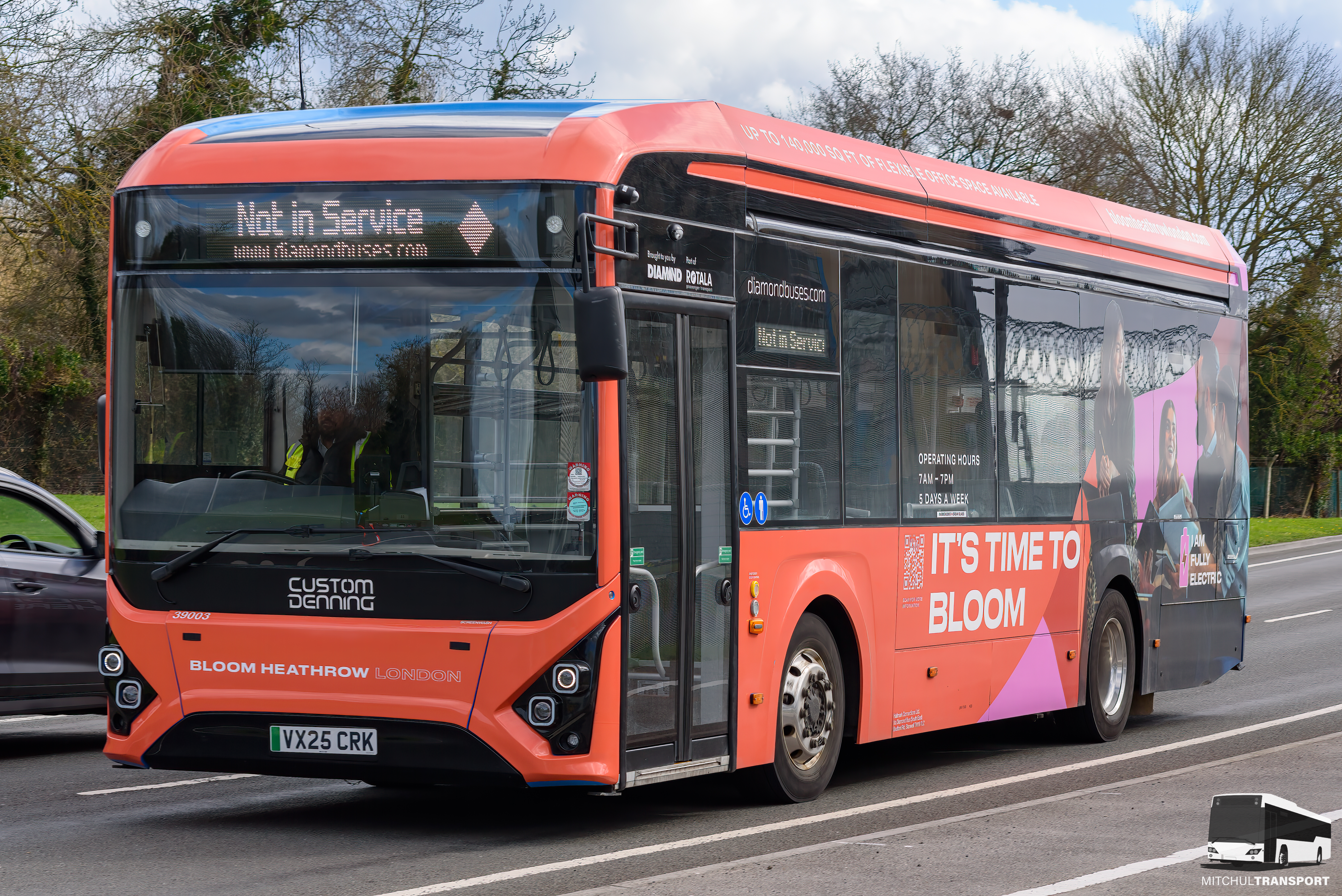
Custom Denning Element 2 with its revised front fascia

The Custom Denning Element is an electric bus that can travel up to 500 kilometres, a typical range from a full charge and can seat up to 45 passengers. It features driver assistance technologies and with lightweight engineered frame. It has a fully low-floor design, common in buses made for the European market. It is a Transport for NSW Panel 3 approved bus and is manufactured in St Marys.

Following trials, the first 6 Elements entered service with Busways in late 2021, operating around Penrith. The State Transit Authority then placed an order for 10 vehicles to be delivered from December 2021 to March 2022 out of Waverley Bus Depot.

Transport for NSW placed an order for 79 vehicles in 2022, which would operate under Transit Systems in Sydney's Inner West. The first Elements to operate outside of NSW entered service with Donric & Sunbury Bus Service rolled out in mid-2022, with a demonstration model already operating for it. Custom Denning launched the Element electric bus in the United Kingdom, with Diamond East Midlands ordering six vehicles for use around Burton upon Trent in March 2024. The company also plans to build a left-hand drive model for continental European countries like France and Denmark, and possibly launch the Element model in North America.

Beginning in 2023, Custom Denning started producing an updated model of the Element, called the Element 2. Differences from the original Element include, a change from using Actia drive motors to ZF CeTrax motors, a switch in battery technology from Lithium Metal Polymer to Nickel Manganese Cobalt batteries, a new high-voltage system and pantograph overhead charging capability. Visual changes include a revised front bumper and headlights, as well as a reduction in overall vehicle length from 12.5 metres to 12 metres. In addition to the 12 metre bus, Custom Denning also produces a shorter 10.5 metre midibus version of the Element 2.

Custom Denning is also planning a hydrogen fuel-cell powered variant, dubbed the Element H2.
