= Busabout =

Busabout may refer to:

- Busabout Sydney - bus operator in Sydney, Australia
- Busabout Wagga Wagga - bus operator in Wagga Wagga, Australia
- Busabout, a European travel operator owned by The Travel Corporation
