= Busways =

Australian bus company

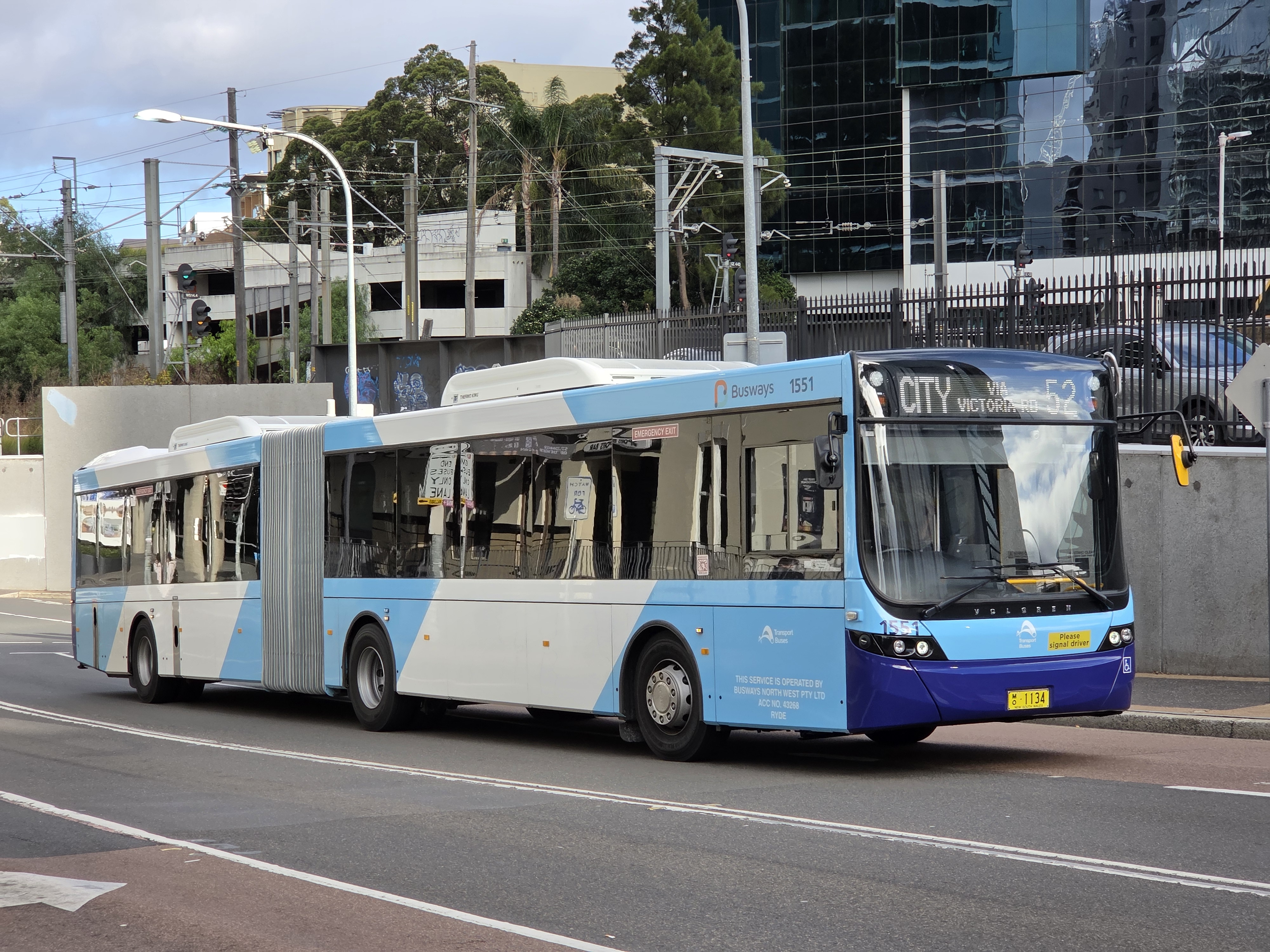
- A Volgren bodied Scania K360CA in July 2026
- Parent: Rowe family
- Commenced operation: 1942; 84 years ago
- Headquarters: Pymble
- Service area: Adelaide; Sydney; Central Coast; Mid North Coast
- Service type: Bus services
- Depots: 20
- Fleet: 1375 (July 2026)
- Managing Director: Byron Rowe
- Website: www.busways.com.au

The Busways logo between 2008 and 2019

Busways is an Australian bus company operating services in Sydney, and in the Central Coast, Mid North Coast regions of New South Wales and Adelaide. It is the largest privately owned bus operator in Australia.

== History ==
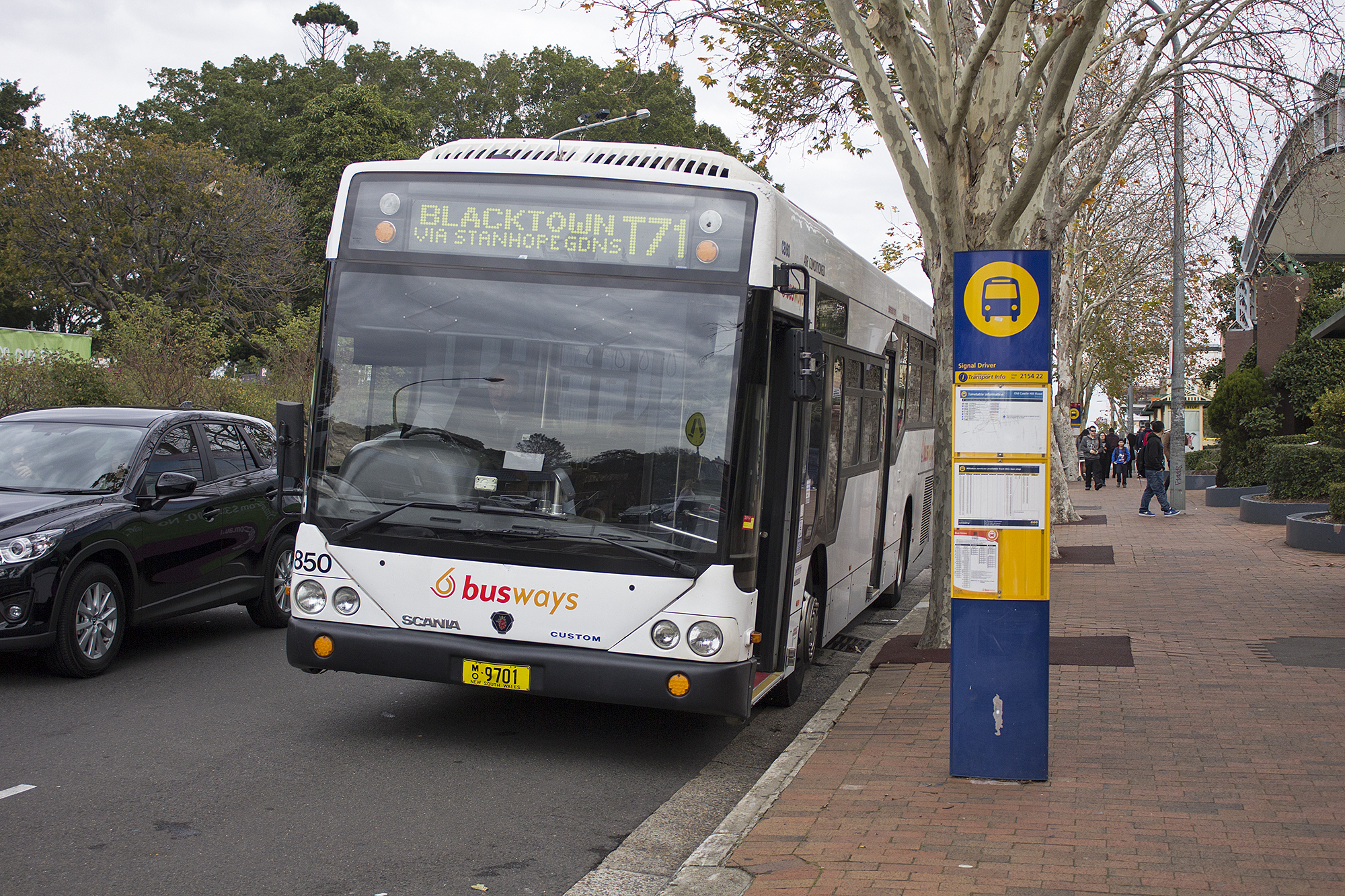
A Custom Coaches bodied Scania K230UB at Castle Hill in July 2013

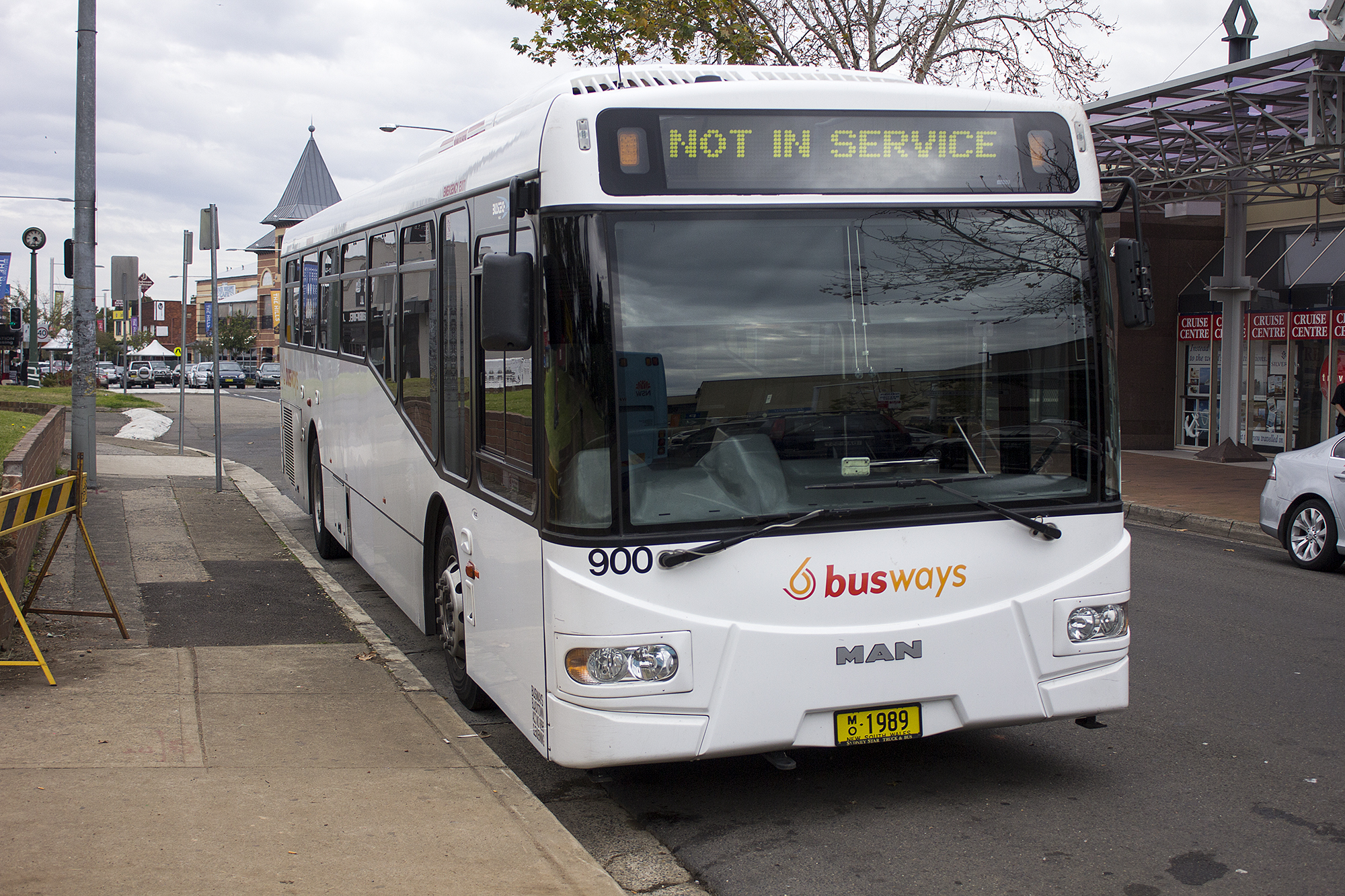
A BusTech 'VST' bodied MAN 18-310 in old white livery

The origins of Busways can be traced to 1942 when Dick Rowe commenced a hire car service from Rooty Hill to Plumpton. In 1946 Rowe purchased his first bus and further expansion saw a depot established in Plumpton in 1958.

In 1958, in partnership with Fred Bowman, Rowe purchased Parramatta-Villawood Bus Service followed by Campbelltown Transit on 13 May 1967 in partnership with Roger Graham and Jim Newport. In 1970, Rowe had taken full ownership of Campbelltown Transit and in January 1978 sold out of Parramatta–Villawood.

In 1984, Riverstone Bus Service was purchased and merged with Rowe's Bus Service. In June 1986 Higlett's Motor Coach Services, Camden was purchased and rebranded Macarthur Coaches.

In 1988, Campbelltown Transit, Macarthur Coaches and Rowe's Bus Service were all rebranded as Busways. In February 1990 the Seargent's, Charmhaven business on the Central Coast was purchased followed in July 1994 by the neighbouring Peninsula Bus Lines business in Kincumber, Ourimbah and Umina.

In June 1991, the Campbelltown to Wollongong service of Farmborough Coaches was acquired. In November 1992 Busways took over operation of the routes of Leslies, Arndell Park following its collapse before purchasing them in May 1993.

In September 2003, Busways purchased the Great Lakes and Mid North Coast services of King Brothers from its administrator. In January 2008 the school services of Yarramalong Bus Lines, Wyong were purchased followed by those of Kulnura Bus Lines in July 2009.

Between 2014 and 2015, Busways attempted to venture overseas by submitting a bid for the Bulim Bus Package in Singapore. It was among the 10 local and foreign bus operators who had submitted a bid for the tender. The bid was ultimately unsuccessful.

In 2020, Busways was successful in expanding its bus operations outside of New South Wales, when it was awarded the contract to operate the Outer South bus network in Adelaide. Busways took over the operations from SouthLink in July that year.

== Current operations ==
=== Western Sydney services ===
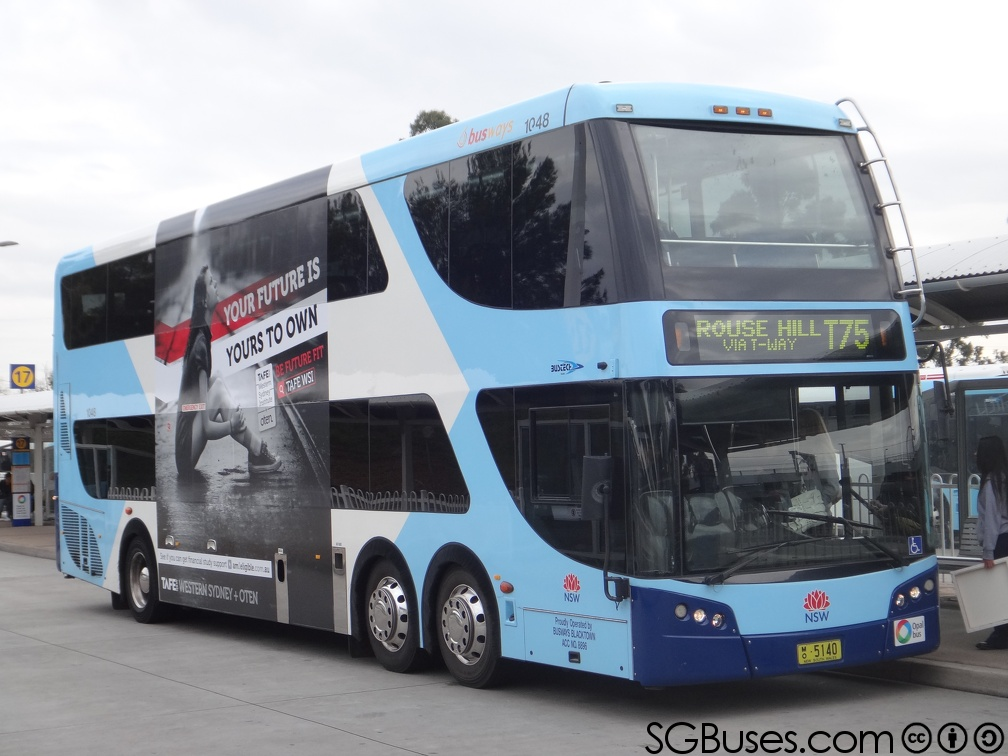
Bustech CDi double decker, running route T75

Since 2005, Busways' services in the Blacktown area have formed part of Sydney Bus Region 1, held in partnership with Westbus and Hawkesbury Valley Buses. Operating from a depot in Glendenning, scheduled route and school services cover an area encompassed by Seven Hills and Castle Hill in the east; Rouse Hill and Riverstone in the north; Shalvey and St Marys in the west; Minchinbury and Prospect to the south.

The regional centres of Blacktown and Mount Druitt are a focus for all services, with trips also serving the employment centres of Eastern Creek, Huntingwood and Macquarie Park. Bus/train connections are provided at a variety of railway stations. Busways also operates services along the North-West T-way between Blacktown and Rouse Hill.

In March 2007, the Parramatta - Rouse Hill section of the North-West T-way opened. Bus routes 730 (renumbered T63) and 735 (renumbered 616, now 616X) were transferred from Busways to Hillsbus while bus route 718 was transferred from Hillsbus to Busways. In November 2007, the Blacktown to Parklea of the North-West T-way opened. Existing Busways bus routes were amended and renumbered to become new T-way routes (T70, T71, T74 and T75) and ran mainly along the new section.

In October 2013, Busways after winning the tender for Sydney Bus Region 1, took over the operation of services in the St Marys, Penrith, Windsor and Richmond areas from Hawkesbury Valley Buses and Westbus.

In May 2019, as part of the Sydney Metro opening, all Busways T-way services were renumbered from "T7x" to "73x", and the former Hawkesbury Valley Buses services (661–664) were renumbered to "67x" or "74x". Some services were also rerouted to stop at Tallawong station.

Between 2022 and 2023, the contract for region 1 was put out to tender and was subsequently retained by Busways. The new contract commenced in December 2023 for a period of seven years.

=== Sydney North Shore & West services ===
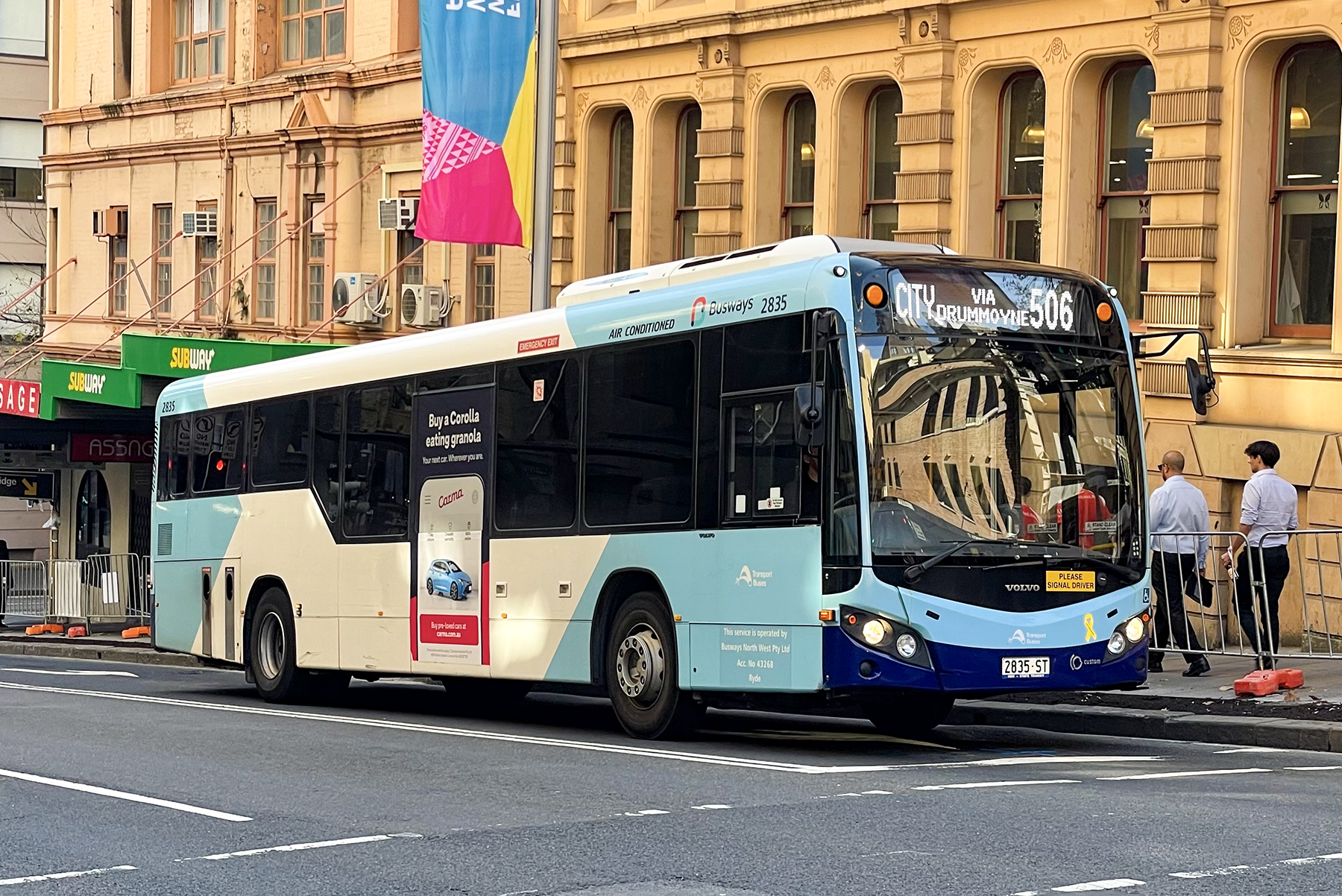
A Custom Coaches bodied Volvo B7RLE in July 2023

In July 2021, Busways was announced as the new operator for Sydney Bus Region 7 in the North Shore, Northern and Western regions of Sydney. Busways commenced operating Region 7 on 9 January 2022 as part of an eight-year contract, taking over from State Transit.

=== Central Coast services ===
The Central Coast has services provided under the Outer Metropolitan Bus System Contract Region 6. This contract with the NSW Government covers a broad area that stretches from Patonga and Wagstaffe in the south through to Swansea and Morisset in the north; and Dooralong and Mangrove Mountain in the west to Terrigal and MacMasters Beach in the east.

With depots at Kincumber and Woongarrah, the key centres served by Busways routes include Gosford, Tuggerah, Wyong, Lake Haven, Erina Fair and Woy Woy. Occasional trips also serve Charlestown in the north and Spencer in the west.

Between 2021 and 2023, the contract for region 6 was put out to tender and was subsequently retained by Busways. The new contract will commence on 28 July 2024 for a period of seven years.

=== North Coast services ===
In September 2003, Busways purchased the services of King Brothers on the Mid North Coast from its administrator. Busways provides services throughout Grafton, Kempsey, Wauchope, Laurieton, Coffs Harbour, Port Macquarie, Yamba, Bulahdelah, Heatherbrae, Macksville and Raleigh.

=== Adelaide Outer South services ===
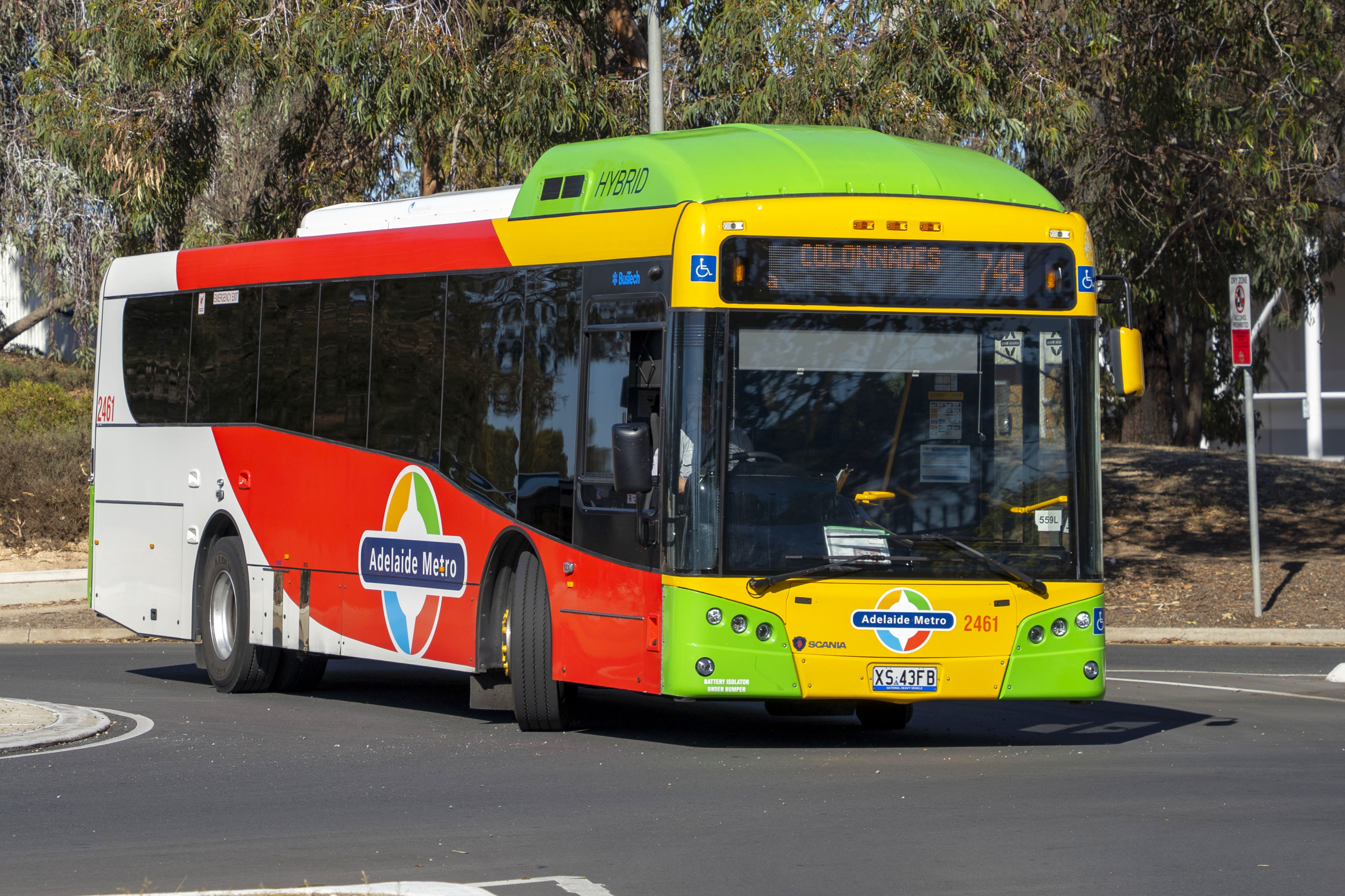
An Adelaide Metro BusTech bodied Scania K320UB hybrid departing Noarlunga Centre Interchange in April 2025

In July 2020, Busways took over Adelaide's Outer South network from SouthLink, including the Lonsdale and Seaford depots.

== Former operations ==
=== Macarthur services ===
From 2005 Busways' services in the Macarthur Region formed Sydney Bus Region 15. Operating from depots at Campbelltown and Smeaton Grange, route and school services operated as far east as Kentlyn and Wedderburn; south to Appin and Wollongong; west to The Oaks and Warragamba; and north to Catherine Field and Raby.

Regional and district centres such as Campbelltown, Macarthur Square, Narellan and Camden were the focus of all routes. Busways operated the free Macarthur CBD shuttle which was terminated in August 2014. In June 2014 operation of the Sydney Bus Region 15 passed to Busabout.

=== Coach services ===
Rowe's Bus Service previously operated coach services with a fleet of six Dennings until the coach licences were sold to Westbus in 1986. Macarthur Coaches also operated some coaches that were sold in 1990. Until October 2011 Busways operated a service from Forster to Sydney. Busways operate coach services from Newcastle to Taree under contract to NSW TrainLink.

== Fleet ==
Having traditionally purchased Leyland buses, in November 1978 the first of 30 Volvo B58s were delivered. Since then, Busways have purchased buses from MAN, Mercedes-Benz, Scania and Volvo. In the 1970s the Rowe fleet livery was white with a red stripe, with an orange stripe added in 1988. Since 2010, the blue and white Transport for NSW livery has been applied to the Sydney and Central Coast fleets.

As of July 2026, Busways operates 1,238 buses in NSW, including 58 electric buses, and 137 buses in Adelaide. Busways operates a total of 1,375 buses across Australia.
