= Smithfield Bus & Coach Works =

- Industry: Bus manufacturing
- Founded: June 1971
- Founder: Bosnjak family
- Defunct: May 1981
- Successor: Custom Coaches
- Headquarters: Smithfield, Australia

Smithfield Bus & Coach Works was an Australian bus bodybuilder in Smithfield, Sydney.

== History ==
Smithfield Bus & Coach Works was formed when Westbus proprietors Bob and John Bosnjak purchased the bus bodying designs and jigs of Commonwealth Engineering in 1971.

As well as buses for private operators, Smithfield bodied these buses for government operators:

- 312 Leyland Leopards for the Public Transport Commission
- 22 AEC Swift 505s for ACTION
- 74 Volvo B58s for ACTION
- 16 MAN SL200s for ACTION
- 1 MAN SG192 for ACTION
- 33 Volvo B58s for Metro Tasmania

In May 1981 Smithfield Bus & Coach Works was sold to Custom Coaches.
