= Hawkesbury Valley Buses =

Australian bus company

- Parent: Joe & Tony Calabro
- Commenced operation: June 1958
- Ceased operation: 24 April 2017
- Headquarters: Oakville
- Service area: City of Hawkesbury
- Service type: Bus charter operator
- Alliance: Busabout Sydney
- Depots: 1
- Fleet: 11 (December 2014)
- Website: www.busabout.com.au

Hawkesbury Valley Buses was an Australian bus company in Western Sydney.

== History ==
Hawkesbury Valley was formed in June 1958 when Bob Kirkpatrick purchased the Maraylya to Windsor and Riverstone services from NK Lakeman-Fidler. In 1977 the depot moved from George Street, South Windsor to Old Stock Route Road, Oakville. In February 1984 the Windsor to Wisemans Ferry service was purchased from R Clarkson.

In November 1990, Hawkesbury Valley was sold to Joe and Tony Calabro. The Calabro family had sold their 70 vehicle Bonnyrigg operation to Westbus in June 1989 and subsequently purchased Surfside Buslines in October 1989.

The Calabros expanded their Sydney presence purchasing Neville's Bus Service in 1994 and Liverpool Transport Co in 1997. During 1994/95 Hawkesbury Valley operated a service between the international and domestic terminals at Sydney Airport for Qantas.

From 2005 Hawkesbury Valley's services formed part of Sydney Bus Region 1, held in partnership with Busways and Westbus. On 6 October 2013, Busways commenced operating Region 1 services in its own right. This resulted in it taking over the services operated by Hawkesbury Valley. It continued to trade as a charter operator until closing on 24 April 2017. As at December 2021, the Oakville depot was occupied by Telfords Bus & Coach.

== Fleet ==
As at December 2014, the fleet consisted of 11 buses. Until 1990 Hawkesbury Valley operated two Austral Tourmaster coaches. Many of Hawkesbury Valley's buses came from or went to other Calabro group companies. The fleet livery was blue and gold.
