= Busabout Wagga Wagga =

Australian bus company

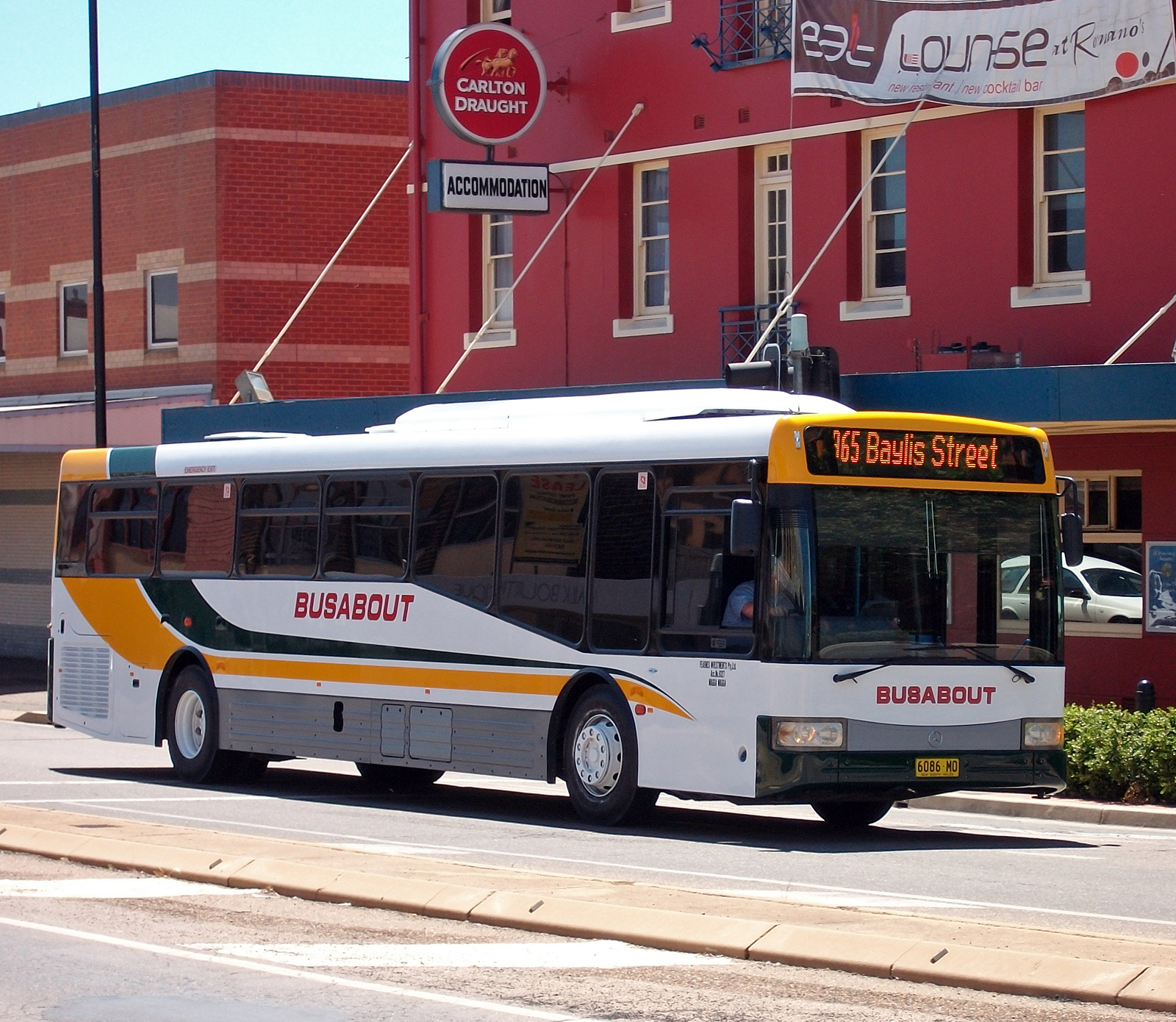
- Bustech bodied Mercedes-Benz OC500LE in October 2009
- Parent: Joe & Tony Calabro
- Founded: 1916
- Headquarters: East Wagga Wagga
- Service area: Wagga Wagga; Harden
- Service type: Bus services
- Alliance: Busabout Sydney
- Routes: 8 town services 48 school bus routes
- Depots: 2
- Fleet: 61 (December 2014)
- Website: www.busaboutwagga.com.au

Busabout Wagga Wagga, formerly Fearnes Coaches, is an Australian bus company with depots in Wagga Wagga and Harden, New South Wales.

== History ==
=== Fearnes Coaches ===
Fearnes Coaches logo

Fearnes Coaches was founded by William Fearne and William Borlase in 1916 as a general carrier and charter bus operator, however Borlase pulled out of the partnership in the early 1920s. In 1927, William Fearne commenced the first route and timetable in Wagga Wagga between the suburb of Turvey Park and Docker Street which was later extended to North Wagga Wagga.

In 1936, William Fearne's son Clive bought the company and ran it until his death in 1989. The business then passed to his son Garry, who died in 1996, leaving the business to his widow Audrey, who ran it until deciding to retire and sell the business in December 2008.

In 1952, two school services were taken over from George Greely and a depot established in Harden. By 1969, the Harden fleet comprised eight buses. Extended touring to the Northern Territory commenced in the 1960s, and in 1974 Fearnes began operating tours from Sydney to Cairns as a contractor for Carah Coaches.

In 1988, an express service to Sydney was introduced followed in 1998 by a service to Melbourne.

In June 1990, Fearnes began coach services from Cootamundra to Tumbarumba, Cootammudra to Griffith and Wagga Wagga to Griffith under a contract with CountryLink. These were retained when re-tendered from December 1992.

Upon being re-tendered, in January 2003 the Albury to Echuca, Wagga Wagga to Echuca and Cootamundra to Condobolin services all passed to King Brothers, the Cootamundra to Tumbarumba service to Transborder Express and the Wagga Wagga to Griffith service to Makeham Coaches. Following King Brothers being placed in administration, Fearnes took over its four CountryLink routes on 22 April 2003.

=== Sale to Busabout ===
On 5 December 2008, Fearnes Coaches was purchased by Sydney bus company Busabout and rebranded as Busabout Wagga Wagga in 2009. In February 2009, the coach service to Sydney was discontinued.

In November 2013, Busabout commenced operating the services previously provided by Charles Sturt University.

== Fleet ==
As of December 2014, the fleet consisted of 57 buses and coaches.
