= Busabout Sydney =

Australian bus company

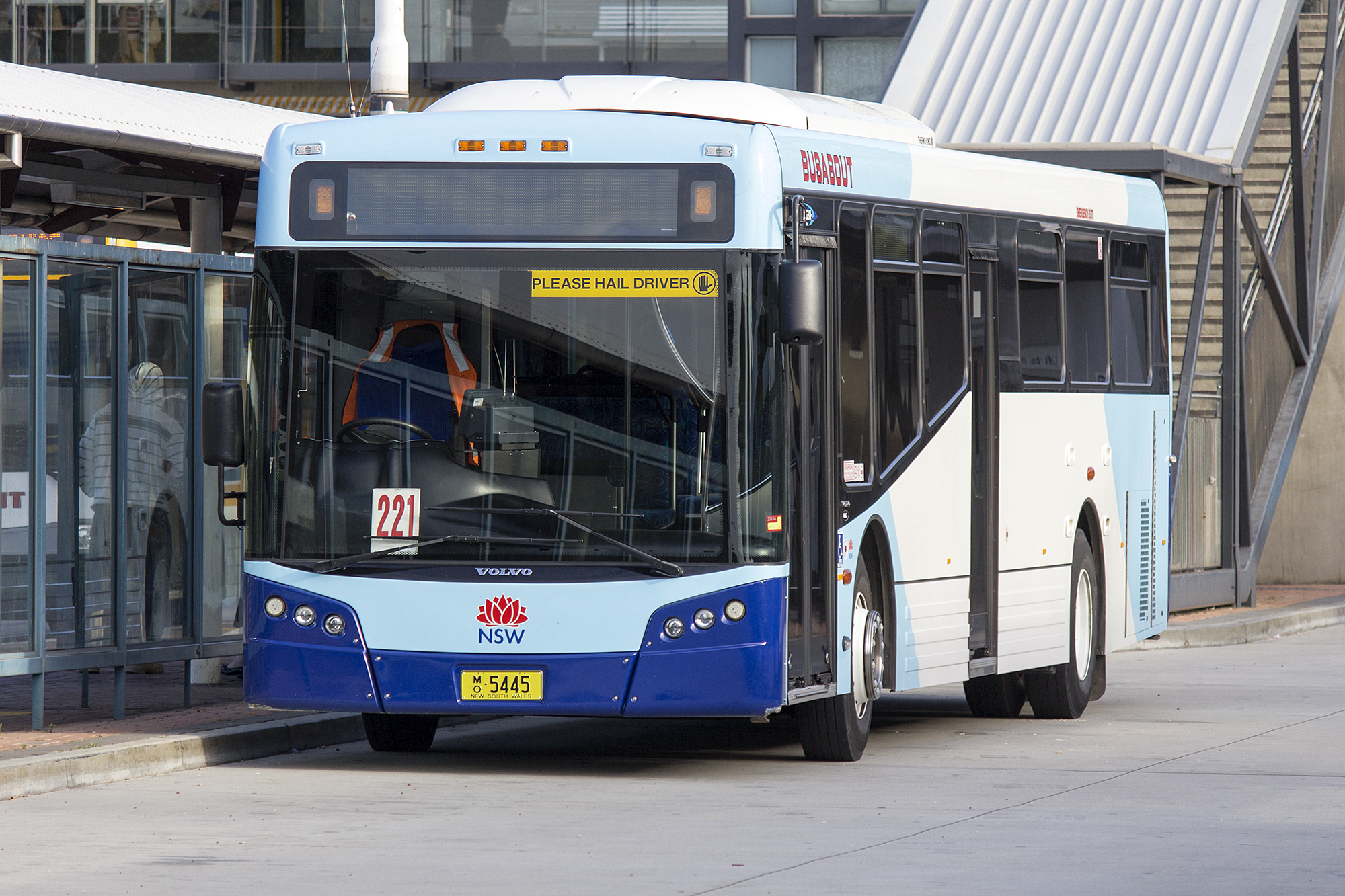
- Bustech bodied Volvo B7RLE at Liverpool station in July 2013
- Parent: Joe & Tony Calabro
- Commenced operation: November 1947
- Ceased operation: 7 October 2023
- Headquarters: Smeaton Grange
- Service area: South West Sydney
- Service type: Bus services
- Alliance: Busabout Wagga Wagga; Hawkesbury Valley Buses
- Hubs: Campbelltown station
- Depots: 3
- Fleet: 124 (December 2020)
- Website: www.busabout.com.au

Busabout Sydney was a bus company that operated route bus services in South West Sydney, Australia. It operated on behalf of Transport for NSW.

== History ==
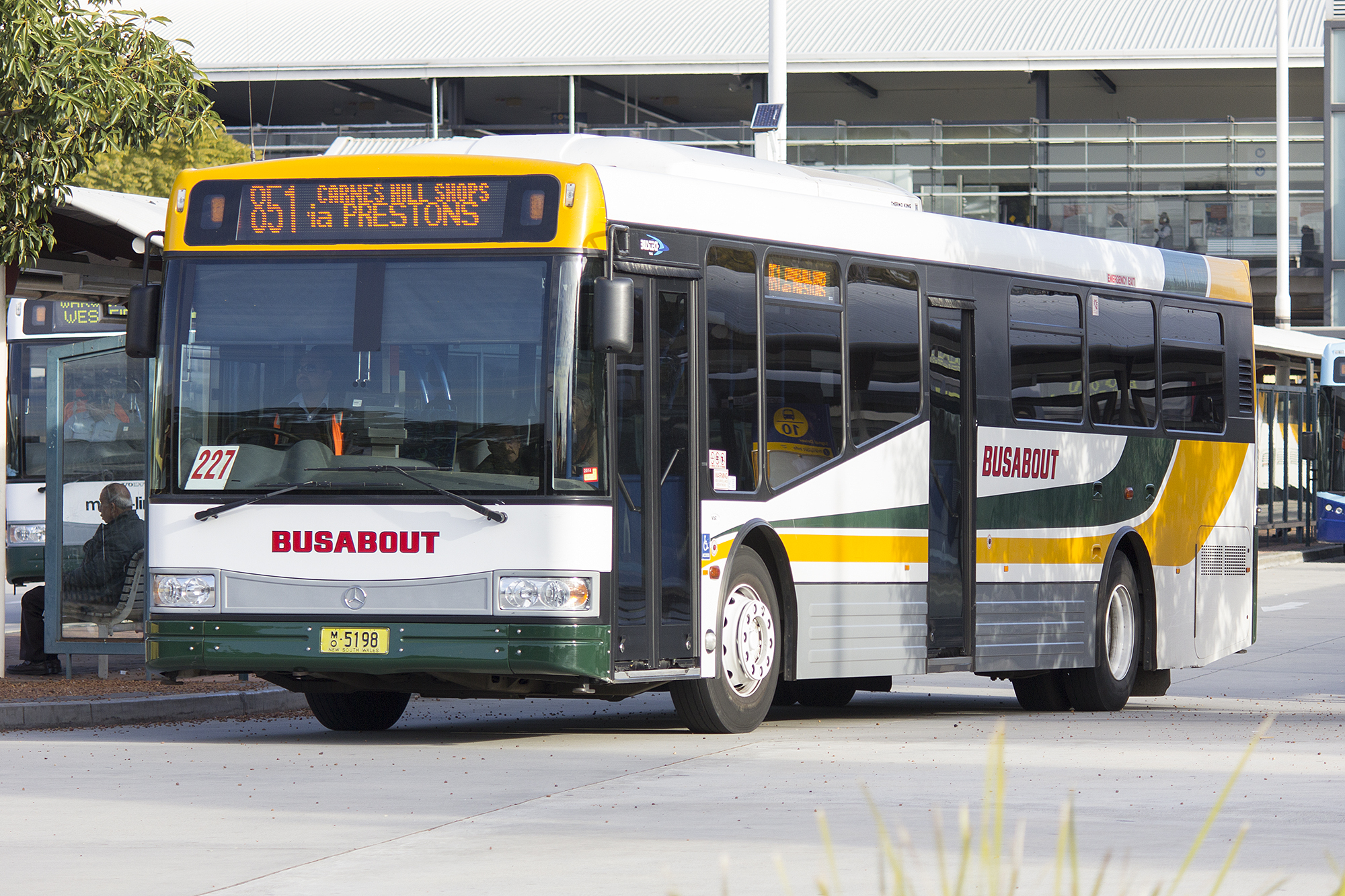
Bustech bodied Mercedes-Benz O 500LE in previous livery at Liverpool station in July 2013

In November 1947, Sid Neville purchased route 58 Liverpool – Leppington – Rossmore – Bringelly from MB & AK Scott. In April 1955, Neville purchased route 94 Liverpool – Ingleburn from Liverpool-Ingleburn Bus Service. In the 1960s, a coach charter business was established under the Coachways brand.

In 1994, Joe and Tony Calabro bought a 50% share of Neville's Bus Service with the operation rebranded as Busabout.

The Calabro family had a long history with the south-western suburbs, having operated services in Bonnyrigg from 1951 until selling the operation to Westbus in June 1989 with 70 buses and coaches. Joe and Tony Calabro subsequently purchased Surfside Buslines in October 1989 followed by Hawkesbury Valley in November 1990.

In September 1997, the Calabros purchased Liverpool Transport Co from the Garrard family, who operated services from Liverpool to Miller, Austral, Hillview and Cartwright. In October 2001, the Calabros purchased the remaining shares in Busabout and it was amalgamated with Liverpool Transport Co at the latter's West Hoxton depot under the Busabout name.

On 2 December 2008, the Calabros purchased the Fearne's Coaches business in Wagga Wagga and Harden and rebranded it as Busabout Wagga Wagga.

From 2005 to 2013, Busabout's services were part of Sydney Bus Region 2, with some routes part of Region 3. On 13 October 2013, Transit Systems took over Region 3 having won a tender to operate the new region including two routes that were operated by Busabout.

On 1 June 2014, Busabout's Sydney Bus Region 2 services passed to Interline and Busabout took over the Sydney Bus Region 15 services from Busways. A new depot in region 15 opened 20 January 2015.

On 8 October 2023, Region 15 services passed from Busabout to Transit Systems NSW, as part of a consolidated Region 2.

== Fleet ==
As at December 2020, the fleet consists of 124 buses. Since 2001 all purchases have been bodied at the Calabro's Bustech operation. With the introduction of the Busabout name in 1994, a white, green and yellow livery was introduced. In 2010 the Transport for NSW white and blue livery began to be applied.
