= King Brothers (bus operator) =

Australian bus company operating scheduled and school services

- Parent: Peter & Tony King
- Commenced operation: 1924
- Ceased operation: 2003
- Headquarters: Kempsey
- Service area: Mid North Coast
- Service type: Bus services
- Depots: 11

King Brothers was an Australian bus company operating route and school services in the Mid North Coast region of New South Wales. It collapsed in April 2003 with debts of $220 million, after owners Peter and Tony King were charged with, and later convicted of, fraud.

== History ==
J&L King was a small family bus operator with route and school services between Kempsey and Crescent Head. It also operated a used bus dealership. In February 1991 it purchased the school services of Argent's. At some stage it operated a Port Macquarie to Tamworth service that was sold in 1996.

After control passed to adopted twin sons Tony and Peter, in the late 1990s / early 2000s King Brothers expanded rapidly with the acquisition of a number of operators in the Great Lakes and Mid North Coast regions including:

- Coffs Harbour Bus Lines
- Glynn's, Grafton
- Grafton Bus Co
- Grafton-Yamba Bus Service
- Great Lakes Coaches, Bulahdelah & Heatherbrae
- Joyce Valley Link, Urunga
- Newman's Bus Service, Macksville
- Pell's Bus Service, Nambucca Heads
- Port Macquarie Bus Service
- Sonter's Bus Service, Laurieton

The business was put up for sale however in April 2003 the business collapsed with debts of $220 million after the owners were charged with, and later convicted of, having defrauded the National Australia Bank and Toyota Financial Services by selling and leasing back fictitious buses. The operation was sold by its administrator to Busways in September 2003.

== Fleet ==
Prior to the expansion of the late 1990s, King's fleet turned over regularly as buses were run in and out of the fleet in quick succession as part of its dealership activities. After the acquisitions it purchased over 60 new Mercedes-Benz such as O405's and O405NH's with the OM447 Engine and Renaults in 1999/2000. A livery containing silver with light green and pink streaks along the side of the bus was adopted.
