= Outer Sydney Metropolitan Bus Service Contracts =

The Outer Sydney Metropolitan Bus Service Contracts (OSMBSC) are contracts issued by the Government of New South Wales to bus operators in areas surrounding Sydney. These regions include the Hunter Region, Central Coast, Illawarra and the Blue Mountains. In 2016–17, 21.6 million passenger journeys were made on Outer Metropolitan bus services.

== History ==
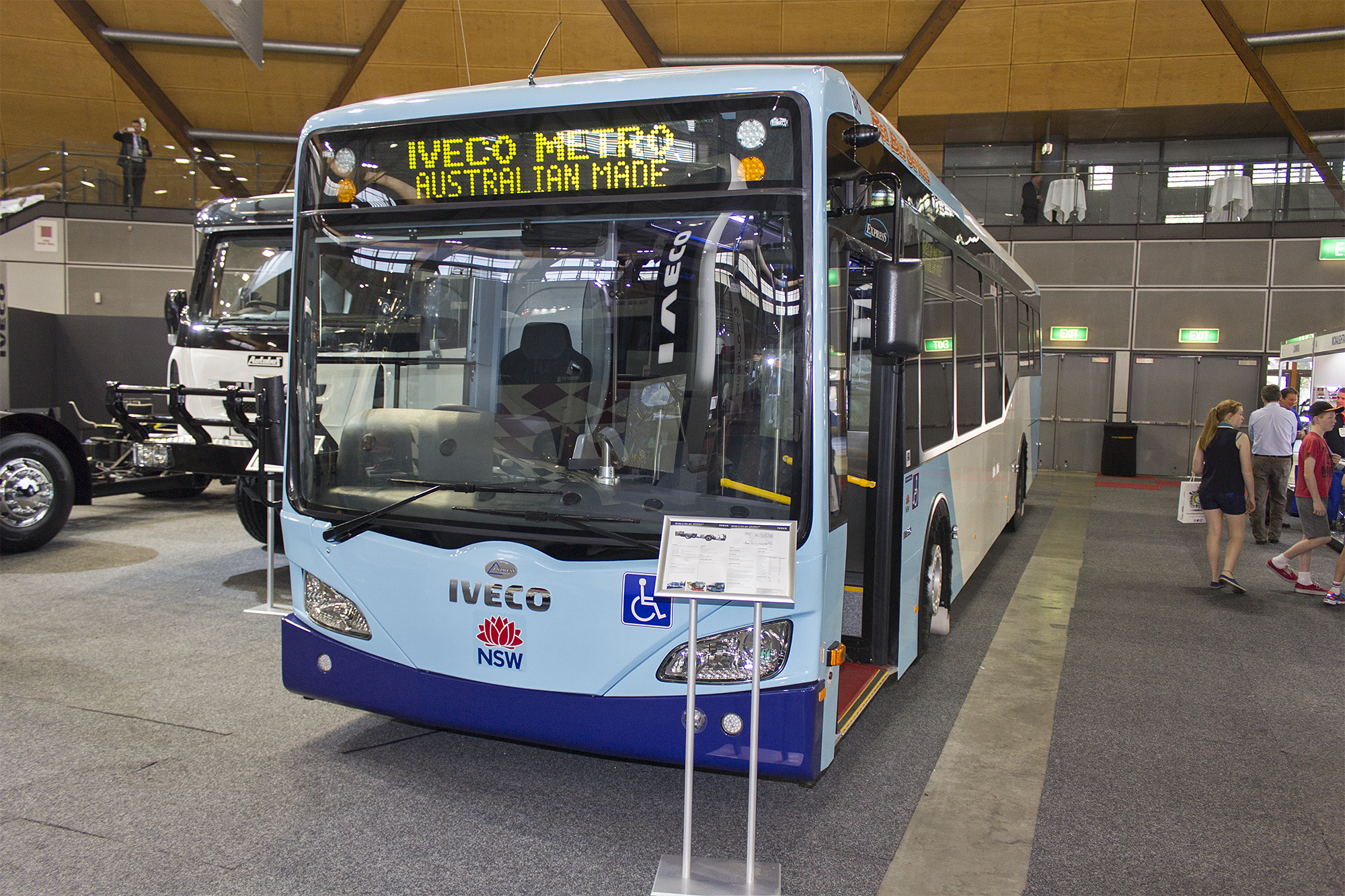
Red Bus Services' Express bodied Iveco Metro in Transport for NSW livery in September 2013

The OSMBSC was initially made up of ten bus system contract regions, OSMBSC 1 to 10. These regions were declared and appeared in the NSW Government Gazette on 1 August 2008.

Unlike the Sydney Metropolitan Bus Service Contracts which are put out to open tender, the government has indicated it does not intend to go down this path with the OSMBSCs, but negotiate with the incumbent operators.

Like the bus contracts in Sydney, a requirement of the OSMBSC contracts is that operators cease using their own liveries and adopt a standardised white and two blues livery as prescribed by Transport for NSW. This livery was first implemented from 2010. As of 2014, the transition to the standardised livery is ongoing.

Originally, regions OSMBSC 6 and OSMBSC 9 each had two operators. In 2013–2014, each of the operators in OSMBSC 6 and OSMBSC 9 were offered separate individual contracts, resulting in the creation of two new regions OSMBSC 11 & 12 from OSMBSC 6 and OSMBSC 9 respectively. This gives a total of 12 regions, with each region having one operator. There was no change of operators or takeover of services between operators. However, Coastal Liner (now Hunter Valley Buses) continues to operate some trips on routes 78, 80, 91 and 98 in Busways region OSMBSC 6.

All OSMBSC contracts were renewed between 1 July 2014 and 2 January 2015, including the Newcastle Buses & Ferries contract for region 5, which was renewed for three years from 1 July 2014. At the end of the three year renewal, region 5 was replaced by NISC 001, with Keolis Downer operating as Newcastle Transport taking over bus and ferry services from Newcastle Buses & Ferries in July 2017.

It was announced in July 2021 that OSMBSC regions 6 and 7 would be put up to tender. OSMBSC region 7 was put out to tender in September 2021. The incumbent operator for OSMBSC region 6 (Busways) retained the contract, with the new contract commencing on 6 July 2024 for eight years. The incumbent operator for OSMBSC region 7 (Red Bus Services) formed a joint venture with CDC NSW to retain the contract which commenced 28 July 2024 for seven years.

== Regions ==
The list of regions and its respective operators in the Transport for NSW or the eTendering NSW website. The information is accurate as of July 2024.

=== Hunter, Newcastle & Central Coast ===
Region	Location	Operators	End date of current contract
OSMBSC 1	Cessnock, Kurri Kurri	Rover Coaches (Buslines Group)	30 June 2028
OSMBSC 2	Maitland, Raymond Terrace	Hunter Valley Buses (CDC NSW)	30 June 2028
OSMBSC 3	Port Stephens	Port Stephens Coaches	30 June 2028
OSMBSC 4	Toronto, Wyee, Morisset	Hunter Valley Buses (CDC NSW)	30 June 2028
NISC 1 (formerly OSMBSC 5)	Newcastle, Charlestown	Newcastle Transport (Keolis Downer)	30 June 2027
OSMBSC 6	Wyong, Tuggerah, Gosford	Busways	27 July 2031
OSMBSC 7	Gosford, The Entrance	Red Bus CDC NSW (CDC NSW)	30 June 2032
OSMBSC 11	Wyong	Hunter Valley Buses (CDC NSW)	30 June 2028

OSMBSC 11 used to be part of OSMBSC 6 until 2014, when it was created as a separate contract region. Its routes were formerly operated by Coastal Liner until it was acquired by ComfortDelGro Australia and its subsidiary Hunter Valley Buses on 1 August 2018.

NISC 1 used to be OSMBSC 5 until July 2017, and was operated by Newcastle Buses & Ferries.

OSMBSC 7 was operated by Red Bus Services until July 2024, when the latter was rebranded as Red Bus CDC NSW and fully acquired by ComfortDelGro Australia.

=== Blue Mountains ===
Region	Location	Operators	End date of current contract
OSMBSC 8	Katoomba, Springwood, Penrith	Blue Mountains Transit (CDC NSW)	30 June 2028

Blue Mountains Transit routes were formerly operated by the Blue Mountains Bus Company until taken over by ComfortDelGro Cabcharge (now ComfortDelGro Australia) and its subsidiary Blue Mountains Transit in December 2014.

=== Illawarra ===
Region	Location	Operators	End date of current contract
OSMBSC 9	Helensburgh	Premier Charters (Premier Transport Group)	30 June 2028
OSMBSC 10	Wollongong South	Premier Illawarra (Premier Transport Group)	30 June 2028
OSMBSC 12	Wollongong North	Dion's Bus Service	30 June 2028

Premier Charters' region 9 routes were operated by Green's Northern Coaches, until taken over by Premier Transport Group in February 2015. OSMBSC 12 used to be part of OSMBSC 9 until 2014, when it was created as a separate contract region.

== Patronage ==
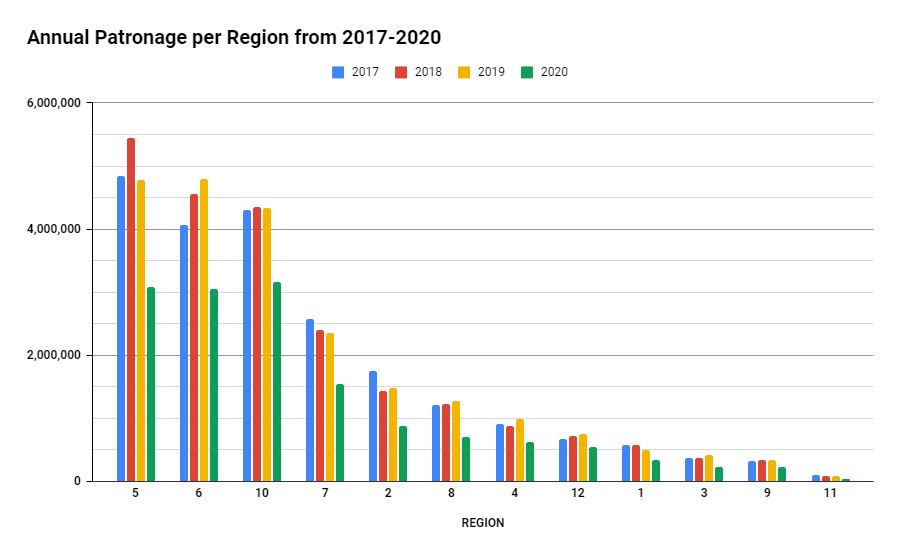
Outer Sydney Metropolitan Bus Contract patronage between 2017 and 2020

Annual Patronage per Region from 2017 to 2025
Rank	Region	Operator	2017	2018	2019	2020 (Note: Patronage was lower than previous years due to people staying at home and not taking public transport to school or work during the COVID-19 pandemic)	2021	2022	2023	2024	2025	Total % Change 2017–24	Total % Change 2024-25
1	OSMBSC 10	Premier Illawarra	4,294,690	4,343,188	4,337,631	3,154,189	2,594,513	3,243,158	3,813,377	3,914,649	3,932,017	-8.85%	+0.44%
2	OSMBSC 6	Busways	4,071,489	4,559,199	4,797,179	3,046,639	2,458,669	2,836,008	3,248,651	3,223,846	3,045,422	-20.82%	-5.53%
3	OSMBSC 7	Red Bus Service	2,565,850	2,391,899	2,350,896	1,541,501	1,428,086	1,531,515	1,641,988	1,563,039	1,496,206	-39.08%	-4.28%
4	NISC	Newcastle Transport	4,840,734	5,445,887	4,775,355	3,075,518	2,686,682	2,478,333	3,376,530	3,424,192	1,456,634 (Note: Patronage figures in Newcastle were significantly underreported in 2025 due to widespread industrial action involving drivers disabling opal readers.)	-29.26%	-57.46%
5	OSMBSC 8	Blue Mountains Transit	1,208,318	1,223,773	1,267,793	696,522	514,236	733,138	1,040,893	1,119,787	1,189,599	-7.33%	+6.23%
6	OSMBSC 12	Dion's Bus Service	661,649	721,573	753,457	536,794	460,813	530,480	628,561	715,743	717,581	+8.18%	+0.26%
7	OSMBSC 4	Hunter Valley Buses	908,598	880,380	981,596	620,029	499,236	530,420	614,203	621,545	606,326	-31.59%	-2.45%
8	OSMBSC 2	Hunter Valley Buses	1,741,286	1,430,096	1,472,078	870,123	667,901	527,156	631,907	607,654	596,640	-65.10%	-1.81%
9	OSMBSC 3	Port Stephens Coaches	363,488	368,397	412,164	224,934	211,262	232,035	279,264	317,221	330,210	-12.73%	+4.09%
10	OSMBSC 9	Premier Charters	321,232	331,140	342,676	229,651	163,517	179,409	239,711	246,232	245,816	-23.35%	-0.17%
11	OSMBSC 1	Rover Coaches	581,377	577,492	494,007	330,797	248,180	237,339	246,060	236,254	228,152	-59.36%	-3.43%
12	OSMBSC 11	Hunter Valley Buses	102,797	88,912	78,333	41,849	29,039	33,450	33,739	34,651	33,897	-66.29%	-2.18%
TOTAL			21,661,508	22,361,936	22,063,165	14,368,546	11,462,898	13,092,441	15,794,884	16,024,813	13,878,500	-26.02%	-13.39%

== See also ==
- Sydney Metropolitan Bus Service Contracts
