= Rover Coaches =

Australian bus company

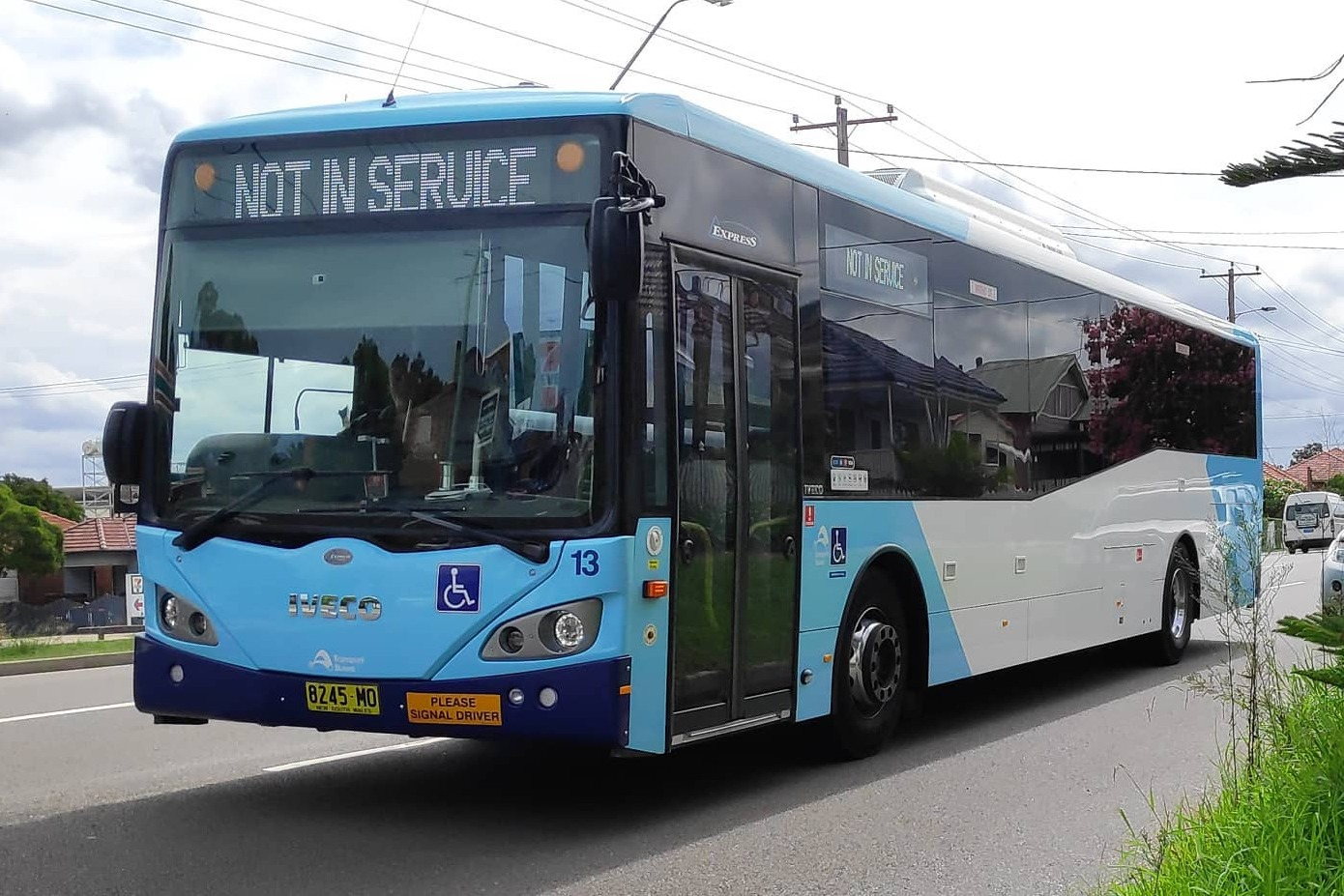
- Express Coach Builders bodied Iveco Metro in February 2024
- Parent: Buslines Group
- Commenced operation: 1925
- Headquarters: Cessnock
- Service area: Hunter Valley
- Service type: Bus & coach operator
- Routes: 11
- Depots: 3
- Fleet: 59 (February 2024)
- Website: www.rovercoaches.com.au

Rover Coaches is an Australian bus company operating services in the Hunter Valley. It is a subsidiary of Buslines Group.

== History ==
In 1925, George Ryder purchased two small bus operators, the South Maitland Motor Company and the Marble Bar Motor Service, and named the company Rover Motors. Ryder was soon joined in the business by Rab Lewis. In the 1930s, Rover Motors introduced the first centre-door double decker buses in Australia and purchased the Cessnock to Maitland service from the Fogg family. In 1944, Rover Motors introduced the first semi-trailer bus in New South Wales. In the 1940s, the Fogg and Mordue families become part owners of the business.

By the 1950s, services ran to Maitland every half-hour from 04:30 until midnight. Services commenced to Wangi Wangi and Swansea on Friday nights, returning on Sundays. Services commenced operating to transport employees to the BHP Newcastle Steelworks. In the 1960s, Rover Motors begins operating coach tours to the Gold Coast and Snowy Mountains. With the withdrawal of passenger services from the South Maitland Railway to Cessnock, Rover Motors began operating services to Newcastle on 3 October 1967.

In the 1970s, Rover Motors opened a travel agency and began operating tours across Australia as well as providing overseas and domestic travel arrangements. In 1986, the Lewis and Mordue families terminated their shared interests in Rover Motors and Hunter Valley Coaches, with the Lewis family taking full ownership of Rover and the Mordue family, Hunter Valley.

In July 2009, a Cessnock to Morisset station service was introduced.

In December 2022, the Lewis family sold Rover Coaches to Buslines Group. The Rover name will be retained.

== Services ==
Since September 2006, Rover's services have formed Sydney Outer Metropolitan Bus Region 1. It primarily operates services from Cessnock to Maitland, with limited services to Morisset and Newcastle Interchange.

== Fleet ==
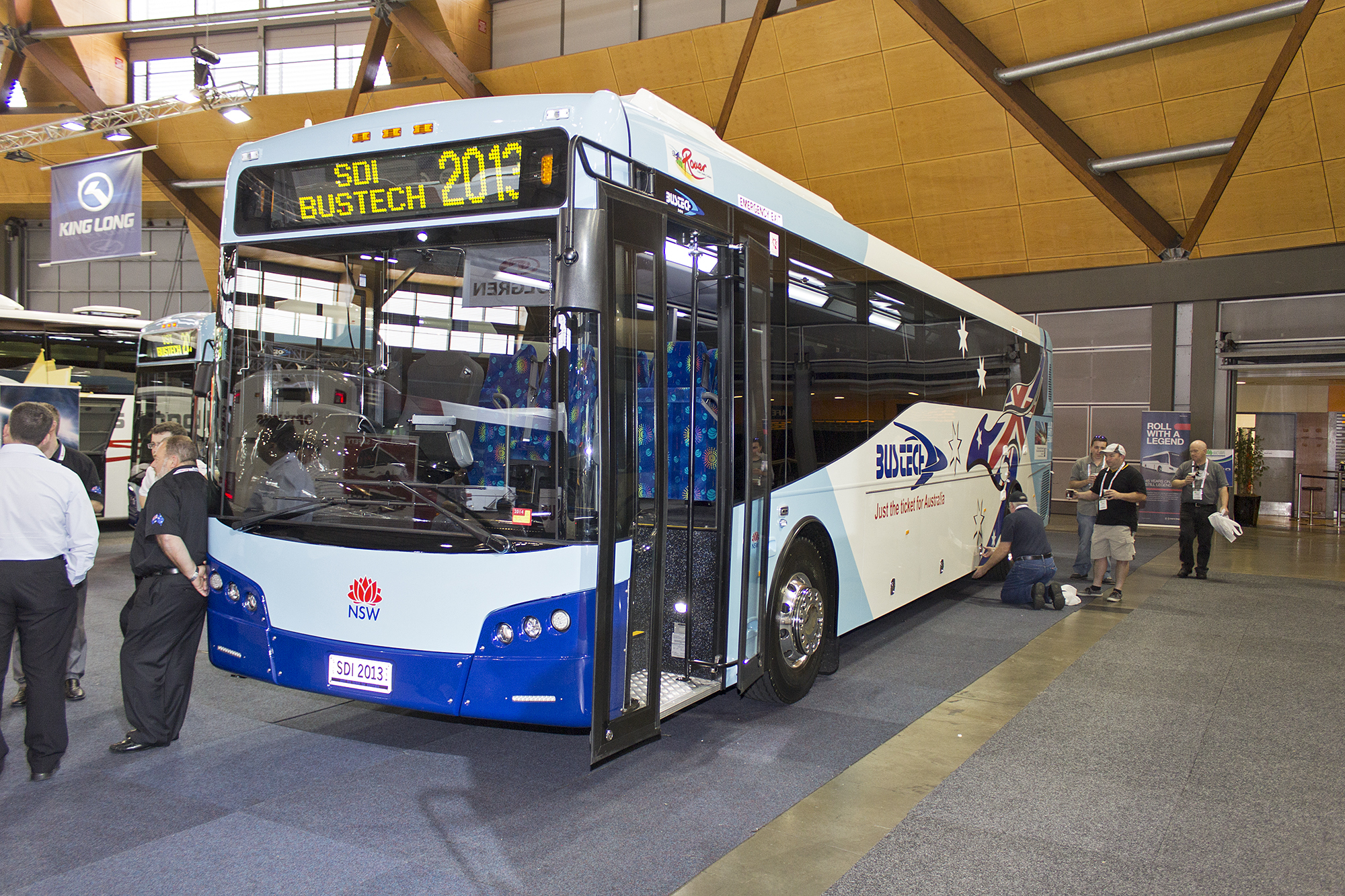
Rover Coaches Bustech SDi on display at the 2013 Australian Bus & Coach Show

As at 20 February 2024, the fleet consisted of 59 buses and coaches. Rover was a long time Leyland purchaser, continuing to build up its fleet with second-hand Tigers long after it had gone out of production. The original all red livery was replaced by red and white in the 1980s, and white and red in the late 1990s. In 2012, the Transport for NSW white and blue livery was adopted for route buses.

== Depots ==
Rover Coaches operate a depot and overflow yard in Cessnock as well as a depot in Kurri Kurri.
