= Red Bus CDC NSW =

Bus company in New South Wales, Australia

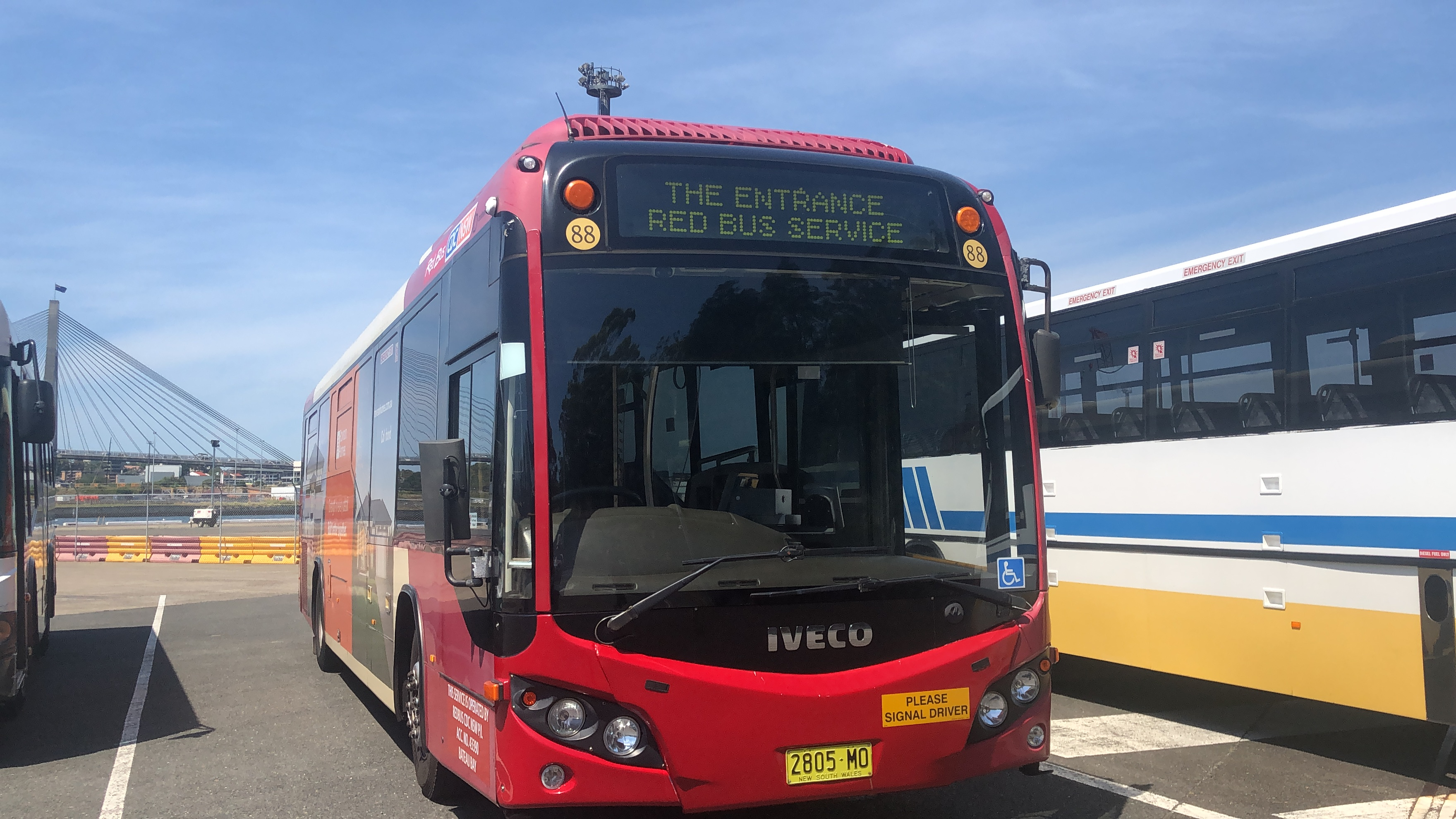
- Custom Coaches-bodied Iveco Metro in 2024
- Parent: ComfortDelGro Australia
- Commenced operation: 1923
- Headquarters: Bateau Bay
- Service area: Central Coast
- Service type: Bus services
- Routes: 25
- Hubs: Erina Fair; Gosford station Westfield Tuggerah; Wyong station
- Depots: 1
- Fleet: 92 (February 2026)
- Website: www.redbuscdc.com.au

Red Bus CDC NSW, formerly Red Bus Services, is an Australian bus company operating route bus services on the New South Wales Central Coast.

== History ==
Former Red Bus Services logo

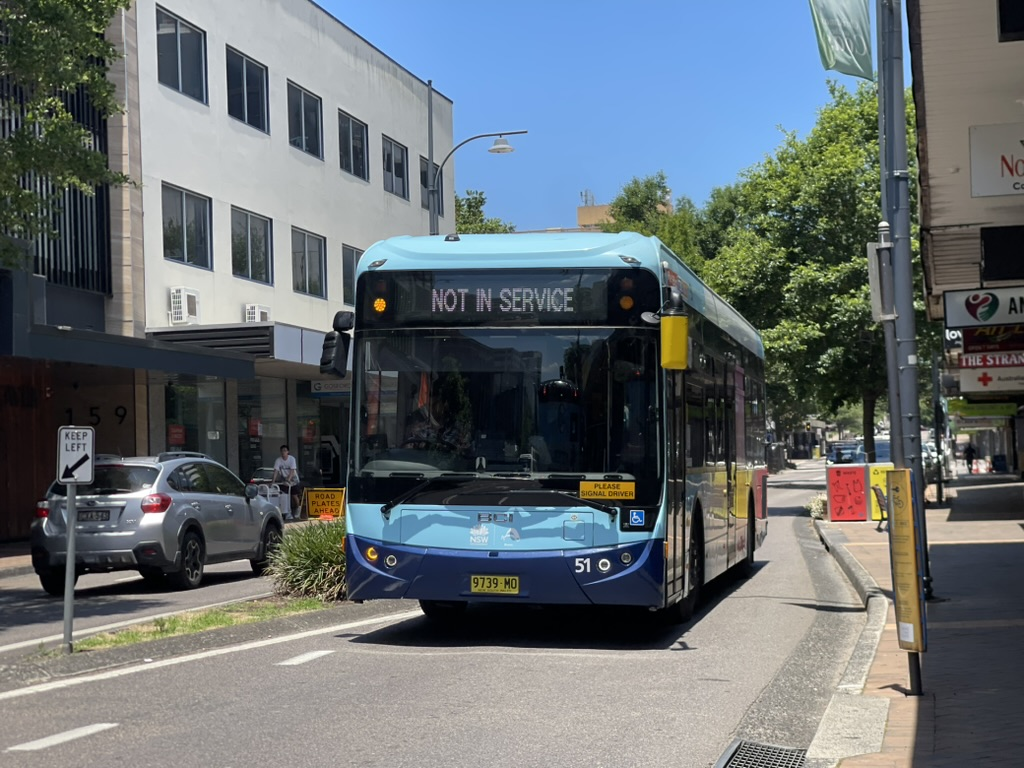
BCI FBC6120BRS6 "Citirider" seen at Gosford

In 1923 Messrs. Barham & Wells started a bus service between The Entrance and Wyong in opposition to a ferry service. In 1924 a service commenced between The Entrance and Gosford trading as The Red Bus Company - Tuggerah Lakes Motors. The business was sold in 1929 to the Sloman family and renamed The Entrance Red Bus Service. In 1946 a service between Gosford and East Springfield was purchased and renamed Gosford Bus Service.

In 1949, services from The Entrance to Wyong, The Entrance to Ourimbah and Ourimbah to Wyong were purchased. In 1952, local services in The Entrance were purchased giving The Entrance Red Bus Service control of all services operating in the area. In the early 1950s, Red Bus also operated coach services out of Newcastle, Gosford and Cooma and was the first mainland bus company to operate a coach to Tasmania. In 1961 the Snowy Mountains tourist services were sold to Ansett Pioneer.

The Gosford to Kariong and Lisarow services were purchased and later sold. In December 1973, the Gosford to Matcham and Holgate service was acquired.

In 1982, a new depot opened at Bateau Bay to replace the one at The Entrance. In 1984, the Central Coast Coaches charter business was sold to Seargents. In June 1988, the Central Coast Airbus between Bateau Bay and Sydney Airport service commenced, ceasing in 2000. The Gosford Bus Service and The Entrance Red Bus Service names remained in use until the late 1990s when both were rebranded as Red Bus Services and all operations consolidated at the Bateau Bay depot.

Since 2008, Red Bus Services has operated Sydney Outer Metropolitan Bus Region 7.

In February 2023, Red Bus and ComfortDelGro Australia (via its subsidiary CDC NSW) set up Red Bus CDC NSW, a 50/50 joint venture, to bid for a renewed region 7 bus contract, which was awarded to the joint venture in July 2023. The new contract began on 6 July 2024 and will run for eight years. On the same day, the Shore family sold its shareholding in the joint venture to CDC. The Shore family retained ownership of the Bateau Bay depot that Red Bus CDC NSW continues to use.

== Services ==
As of January 2025, Red Bus CDC NSW operates services on 25 routes.

== Fleet ==
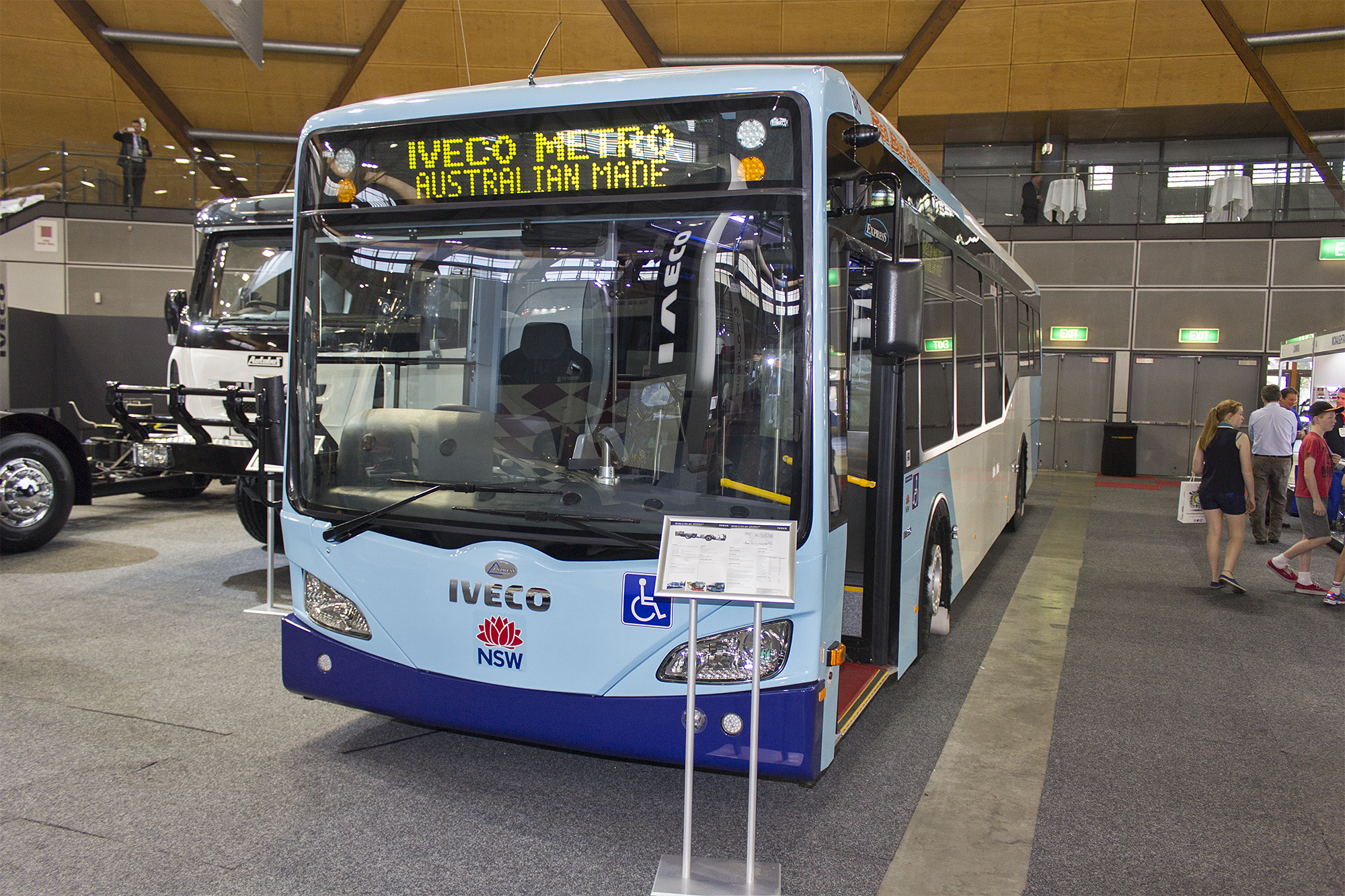
Express bodied Iveco Metro on display at the 2013 Australian Bus & Coach Show

As of February 2026, the fleet consists of 92 buses and coaches. The fleet livery was red and cream until the Transport for NSW white and blue livery was adopted in 2010. The Central Coast Airbus fleet was painted in a grey, white, red and yellow scheme.
