= Bus trailer =

A bus trailer may be:

- A trailer attached to a bus or coach, usually for extra luggage space, or batteries for an electric bus
- the rear portions of an articulated bus, permanently attached
- a passenger carrying trailer, attached by a drawbar (haulage) to a bus
- a passenger carrying semi-trailer, as in a trailer bus
