= P&D =

P&D may refer to:

- Pattern and Decoration, United States art movement
- P&D Coachworks, Australian bus manufacturer
- Shortness of breath
- VESA Plug and Display
