= Stonestreets Coaches =

Australian bus company

- Parent: Premier Transport Group
- Commenced operation: April 1993
- Headquarters: Toowoomba
- Service area: Dalby; Gladstone; Ipswich; Roma; Toowoomba
- Service type: Bus services Tour operator
- Depots: 6
- Fleet: 245
- Website: Official website

Stonestreets Coaches is an Australian bus company operating services in the Dalby, Gladstone, Ipswich and Toowoomba regions in Queensland. Initially a route and school bus operator, it has diversified into providing transport for energy and mining projects and operating tours.

== History ==
Stonestreets Coaches was formed when in April 1993 the Stonestreet family purchased the Centenary Heights & Middle Ridge Bus Service in Toowoomba. Expansion came through the purchase of a shareholding in Dunkley's Coaches and a further three school runs from Cambooya, Greenmount and Wyreema.

In 1997 an operation was established at Roma following the purchase of a school run in Mitchell. In 1999, Stonestreets commenced operating a three-year contract for Bechtel for the transportation of construction workers to the Millmerran Power Station with 17 buses. In 2002, the remainder of Dunkley's Coaches was purchased and a portion of the Cambooya school run. A further contract from Betchel resulted in over 30 buses being mobilised to transport construction workers on the Darwin LNG project.

In 2006, seven school runs in Dalby were purchased from French's Coaches. Geeford Coaches was also acquired in June 2006. In the next few years a number of other companies and services were acquired including additional Dalby school runs, the Ipswich Grammar and Ipswich Girls Grammar school runs, Aries Tours, the remainder of French's Coaches and Toowoomba Transit Coaches, the latter operating a service to Brisbane.

In 2011, Stonestreets commenced operating another contract for Bechtel during the construction of the Gladstone LNG plant. It also commenced operations in the Bowen Basin and Gladstone areas, with contracts for the BHP Mitsubishi Alliance at Daunia and South Walker Creek and its largest contract to date to transport over 600,000 workers a year during Bechtel's construction of three LNG plants on Curtis Island. It has since won further work in the Surat Basin including at the Kogan Creek Power Station.

On 28 February 2012 the service to Brisbane ceased.

In August 2019 Stonestreets Coaches were taken over by the Premier Transport Group

== Fleet ==
As of December 2015, Stonestreets operates 245 buses and coaches.
