= Premier Transport Group =

Australian commercial intercity bus company

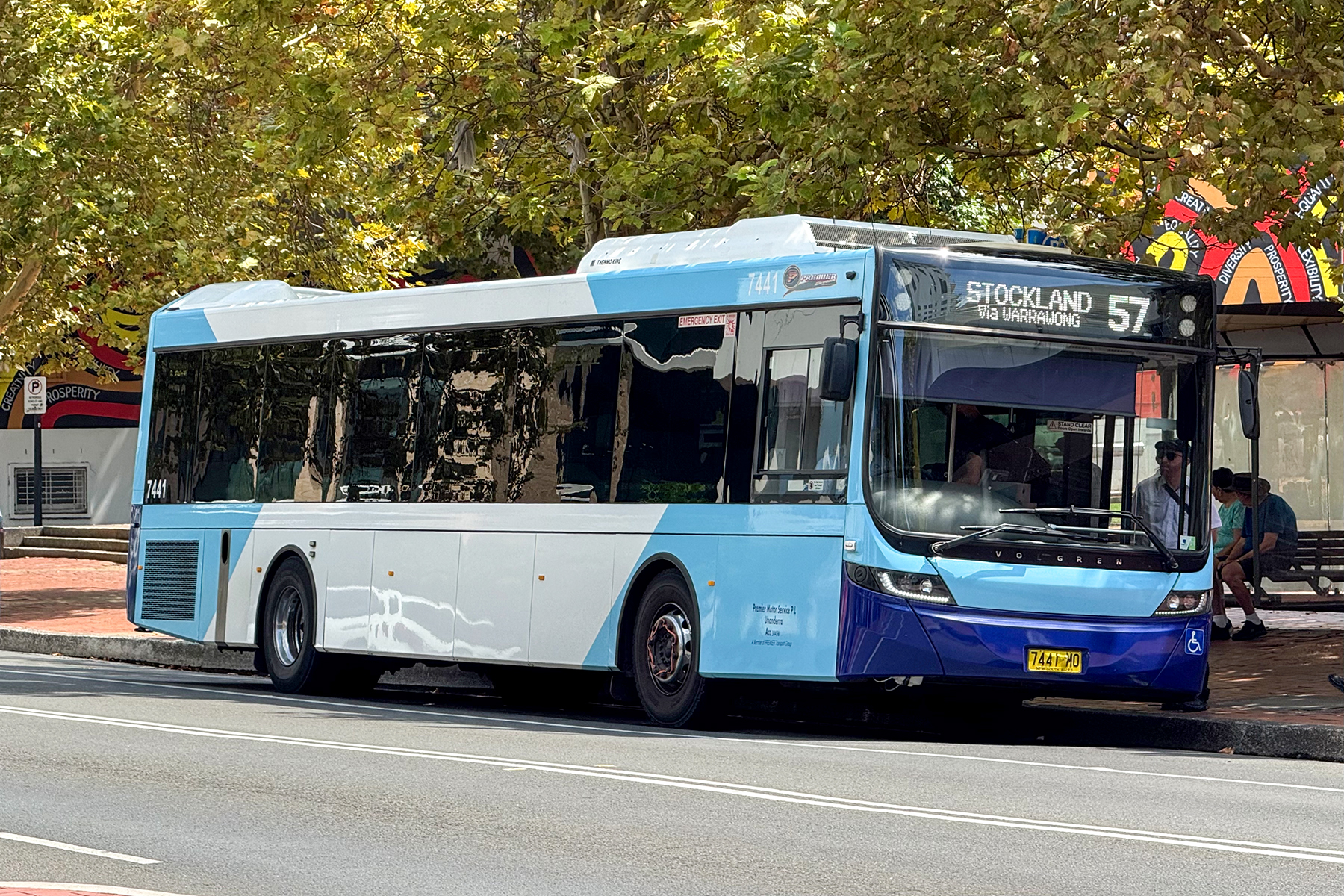
- Premier Illawarra Volgren bodied MAN 18.320 in February 2025
- Parent: John King
- Founded: December 1987
- Headquarters: Nowra
- Service area: Nowra; Wollongong; Gold Coast; Central Queensland
- Service type: Bus and coach
- Alliance: Hopkinsons
- Depots: 9
- Operator: Premier Shoalhaven; Premier Motor Service; Premier Illawarra; Surf City; Premier Queensland; Premier Charters
- Website: premierms.com.au

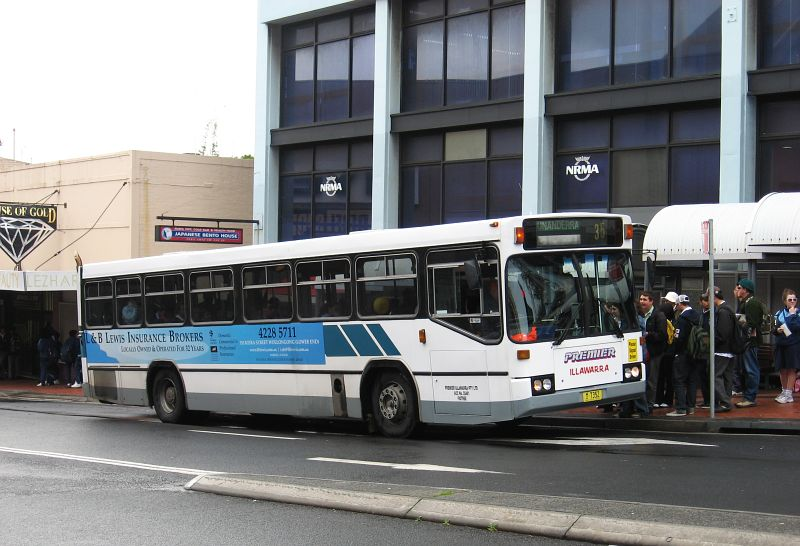
Premier Illawarra Pressed Metal Corporation bodied Mercedes-Benz O405 in Wollongong, September 2007

Premier Transport Group is an Australian operator of bus and coach services in New South Wales and Queensland. Its origins can be traced back to December 1987 when John King purchased Nowra Coaches. It has since expanded through a number of acquisitions.

== Premier Shoalhaven ==
In December 1987, John King purchased Nowra Coaches from Bill Gill. Nowra Coaches expanded in August 1988 when the school bus services of Sampson Tours were acquired. An all blue livery was adopted. Following the purchase of Pioneer Motor Service, the turquoise and white livery of the express operator was adopted in the 2000s and the operation rebranded Premier Shoalhaven.

In July 2013, Premier Shoalhaven commenced operating a service between Moss Vale station and Goulburn under contract to NSW TrainLink. It also operates late night services between Bomaderry and Kiama for NSW TrainLink.

Local bus services operated in Nowra still under the Nowra Coaches name:

- 101: Nowra to Wollongong University Shoalhaven Campus
- 102: Nowra to Basin View
- 103: Nowra to Hyams Beach

== Premier Motor Service ==
Pioneer Motor Service commenced operating in August 1929 when Cecil Haigh commenced operating a service from Bomaderry station (Nowra) to Bega via Tilba, Bermagui, Cobargo and Quaama. In 1946 the Bega to Eden service was purchase from Edwards Bus Service. Towns north of Tilba were served by Bartletts Bus Service and Harrisons Motor Service.

In 1962, Pioneer Motor Service purchased Bartletts Bus Service from John A Gilbert resulting in Pioneer Motor Service covering the whole of the South Coast between Nowra and Eden. Harrisons continued to operate the night service until it ceased operating the service in the 1970s. Pioneer Motor Service commenced picking up on the night service also, becoming the sole long-distance operator on the South Coast. Following deregulation in the 1990s, Pioneer Motor Service extended its services north to Sydney.

In May 1995, the Haigh family sold the business to John King with the depot relocated to the Nowra Coaches facility.

In June 1996, the Sydney to Brisbane services of Kirkland's Bros were acquired followed in August 1996 by the Sydney to Brisbane services of Lindsay's Coaches. Both of these were rebranded as Pioneer Motor Service. In 1997 Greyhound Pioneer Australia took legal action to prevent the Pioneer Motor Service name being used on the services north of Sydney. This action was successful and the operation was rebranded as Premier Motor Service.

In November 1998, services were extended from Eden to Melbourne This extension ceased on 12 December 2014. After a takeover bid for Greyhound Pioneer Australia was unsuccessful, Premier Motor Service commenced a Brisbane to Cairns service in August 2000.

In August 2008, the Lismore to Brisbane services of Kirkland Bros were acquired.

== Premier Illawarra ==
On 14 June 2001, John King purchased the two largest operators in Wollongong, John J Hill and Rutty's Bus Service with 125 buses, and rebranded both as Premier Illawarra.

Since 2008, Premier Illawarra's routes have formed Sydney Outer Metropolitan Bus Region 10 in Wollongong's southern suburbs. It operates depots in Shellharbour and Unanderra.

== Surf City ==
In July 2007, the Surf City coach operation on the Gold Coast was purchased.

== Premier Queensland ==
In 2012, Premier Transport Group purchased the business of Busit Queensland with depots in Mackay and Moranbah. It operates school services and contracts for Central Queensland mines including for the BHP Billiton Mitsubishi Alliance.

== Premier Charters ==
On 2 February 2015, the business of Green's Northern Coaches, Thirroul was purchased with 18 buses and rebranded as Premier Charters. It operates two routes as part of Sydney Outer Metropolitan Bus Region 9 in Wollongong's northern suburbs.

- 2: Stanwell Park – Wollongong
- 15: Helensburgh station – Coalcliff

== Hopkinsons ==
On 1 March 2015, a 50% shareholding in Western Sydney charter operator Hopkinsons was purchased. The other 50% was acquired by Gerard King of Kiama Coaches.

== Kiama Coaches ==
At the time Hopkinsons was acquired, Kiama Coaches also became part of the Premier Transport Group. Kiama Coaches operate local, charter and school bus services in and around the Kiama, Jamberoo, Gerringong and Gerroa regions.

== Stonestreets Coaches ==
In August 2019, Stonestreets Coaches were taken over.
