= Hopkinsons =

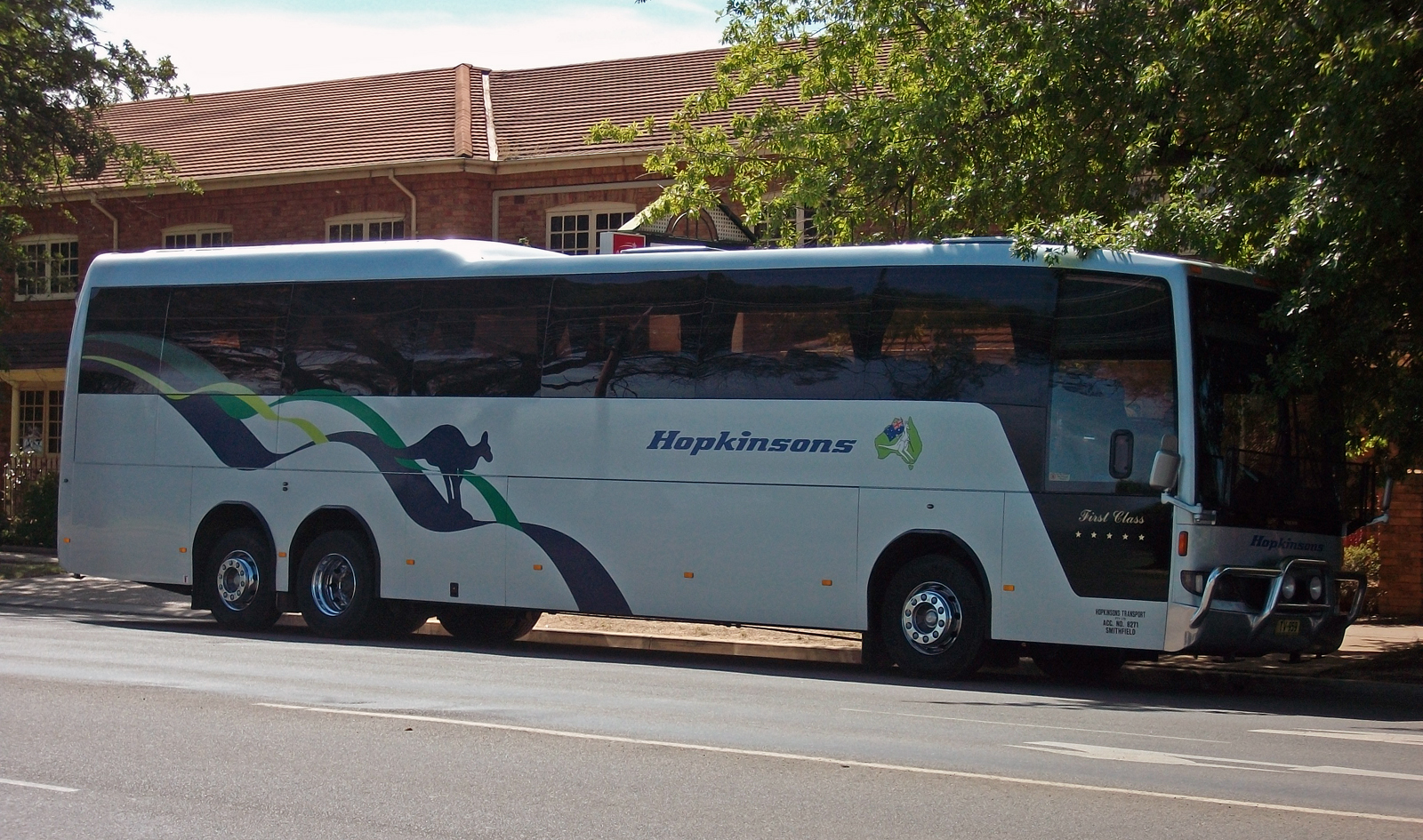
- Australian Autobus bodied Volvo B12B in Wagga Wagga in February 2010
- Parent: Gerard King (50%); John King (50%)
- Commenced operation: 1923
- Headquarters: Helensburgh
- Service type: Coach charter services
- Alliance: Premier Transport Group
- Depots: 1
- Fleet: 25 (June 2015)
- Website: www.hopkinsons.com.au

Hopkinsons is an Australian bus company in Western Sydney. Until October 2013 it operated route services until these passed to Transit Systems. It continues to trade as a charter operator.

== History ==
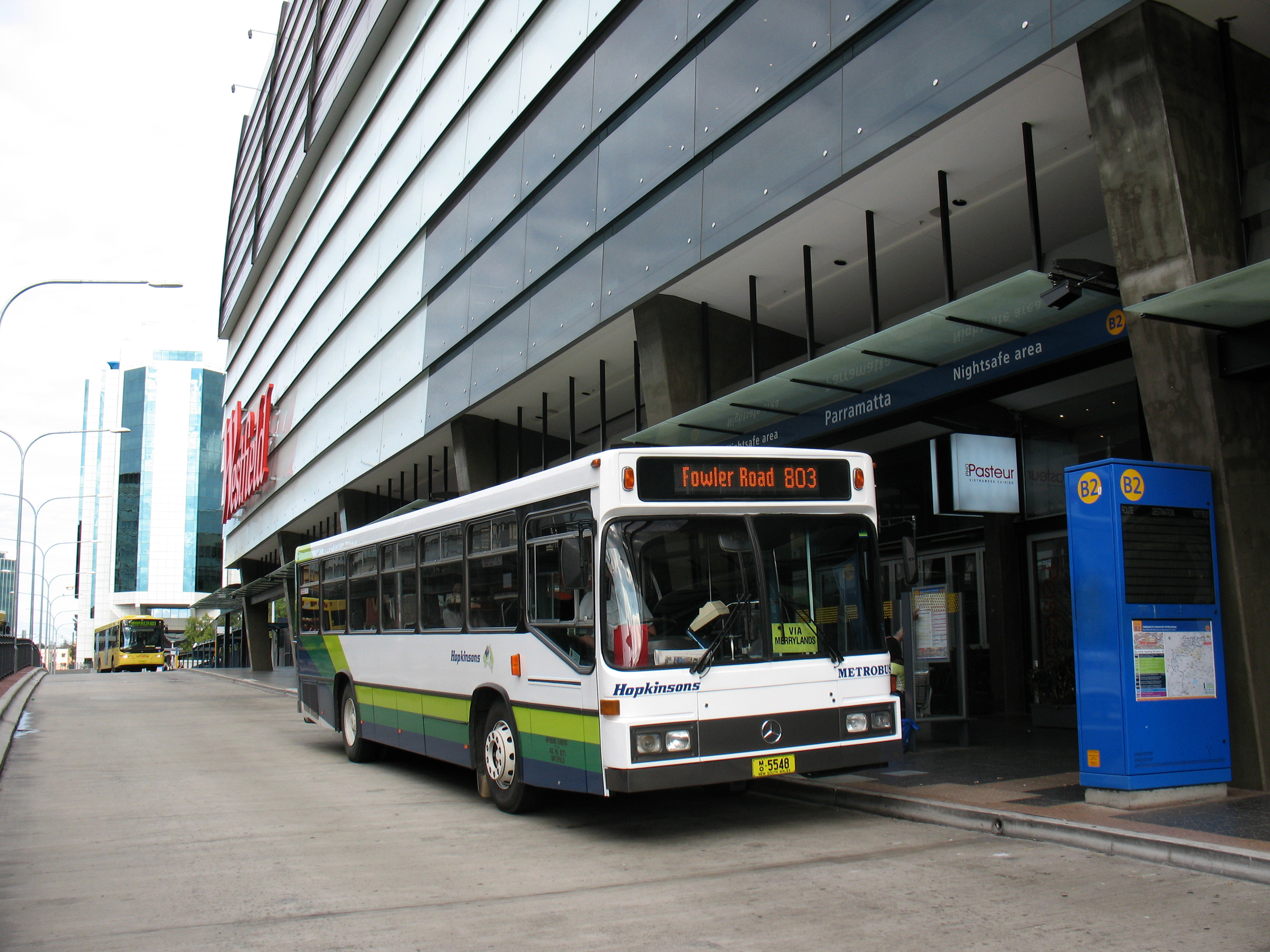
Pressed Metal Corporation South Australia bodied Mercedes O405 at Parramatta in August 2007

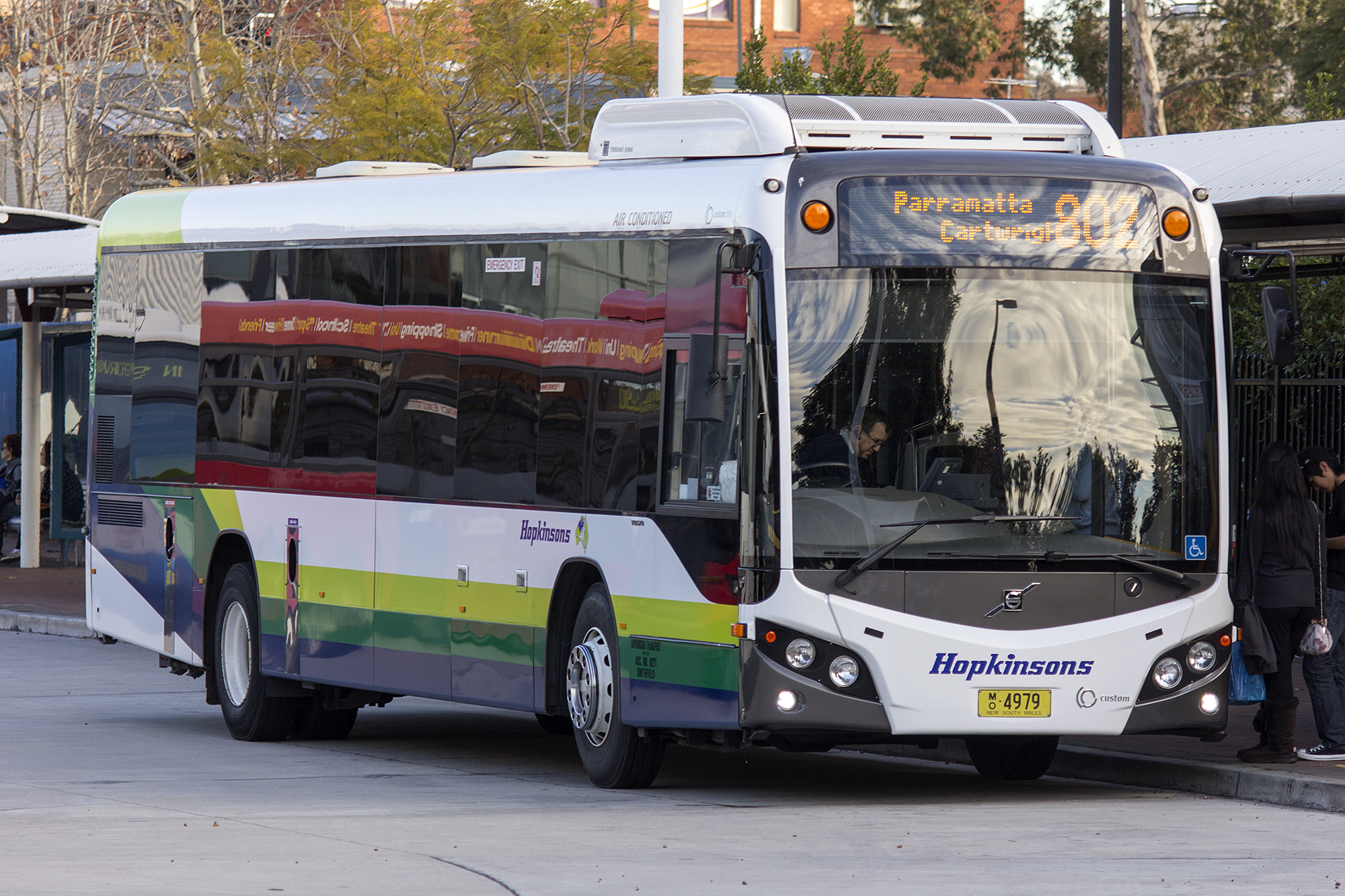
Custom Coaches bodied Volvo B12BLE at Liverpool station in July 2013

Hopkinsons' origins can be traced to 1923 when the Try family, trading as Merrylands Bus Company, commenced operating services in the Fairfield, Guildford and Merrylands area with four buses. By 1957, the fleet had expanded to 16 buses. In 1978, Merrylands Bus Company was sold to Graham Hopkinson and renamed Hopkinsons and relocated to Smithfield.

In late 2003, the coach business of Challenge Coachlines was purchased and amalgamated with Hopkinsons' existing coach charter business. Following the death of Graham Hopkinson in 2011, his four daughters took over running the business.

From 2005, Hopkinsons' services formed part of Sydney Bus Region 3. In October 2013, Transit Systems commenced operating Region 3 including the services formerly operated by Hopkinsons. Hopkinsons continues to trade as a charter operator.

On 1 March 2015, the business was purchased by Kiama Coaches proprietor Gerard King and Premier Transport Group owner John King. Having downsized, the depot in Smithfield closed in June 2020 with the remaining vehicles relocated to that of sister company Premier Charters in Helensburgh.

== Fleet ==
As at June 2015, the fleet consisted of five buses and 20 coaches.

When Hopkinsons purchased the business in 1978 it consisted of Bedfords. In the 1980s these were replaced by ex ACTION AEC Swift and Volvo B58s. In the 1990s it had some ex Public Transport Corporation Volvo B59s rebodied by P&D Coachworks to a design by Hopkinsons followed by some similarly bodied Volvo B10Bs. More recent purchases have been Custom Coaches bodied Volvo B12BLEs.

Hopkinsons has long operated charter coaches. Initially operating Denning Denairs and later Austral Tourmasters, it has since moved to Scania and Volvos.

In the 1980s, the two tone green livery was replaced by the current white, green and blue colour scheme. Coaches used to also carry this livery until a silver livery was adopted at about the same time as the purchase of Challenge Coachlines.
