= Forster Bus Service =

Former Australian bus company

- Parent: Deane family
- Headquarters: Forster
- Service area: Mid North Coast
- Service type: Bus services
- Routes: 42
- Depots: 4
- Fleet: 42 (December 2014)
- Website: www.forsterbus.com.au

Forster Bus Service was an Australian bus company operating route bus services on the New South Wales Mid North Coast.

== History ==
On 20 April 1979, GL & J Nixon purchased Forster Bus Service from Charlie Brown with six buses. In November 1981, the business of D&W Thomas of Bungwahl was acquired with three buses. By March 1990, the fleet had grown to 19.

In November 1990, the business of JJ & CJ Sultana of Dyers Crossing was purchased with four buses.

In 1999, the business was purchased by the Deane family, former proprietors of Sydney operators Clipper Tours, Deanes Coaches and Southtrans. On 1 June 2011, the Wisely's Bus & Coach Service of Wingham was purchased. In October 2011, a service to Sydney commenced after Busways ceased operating a similar service. It ceased on 30 March 2013. In October 2015, the business was sold to the Buslines Group.

== Fleet ==
As at December 2014, the fleet comprised 42 buses.
