= Trailer bus =

Bus formed out of a bus bodied semi-trailer pulled by a conventional tractor unit

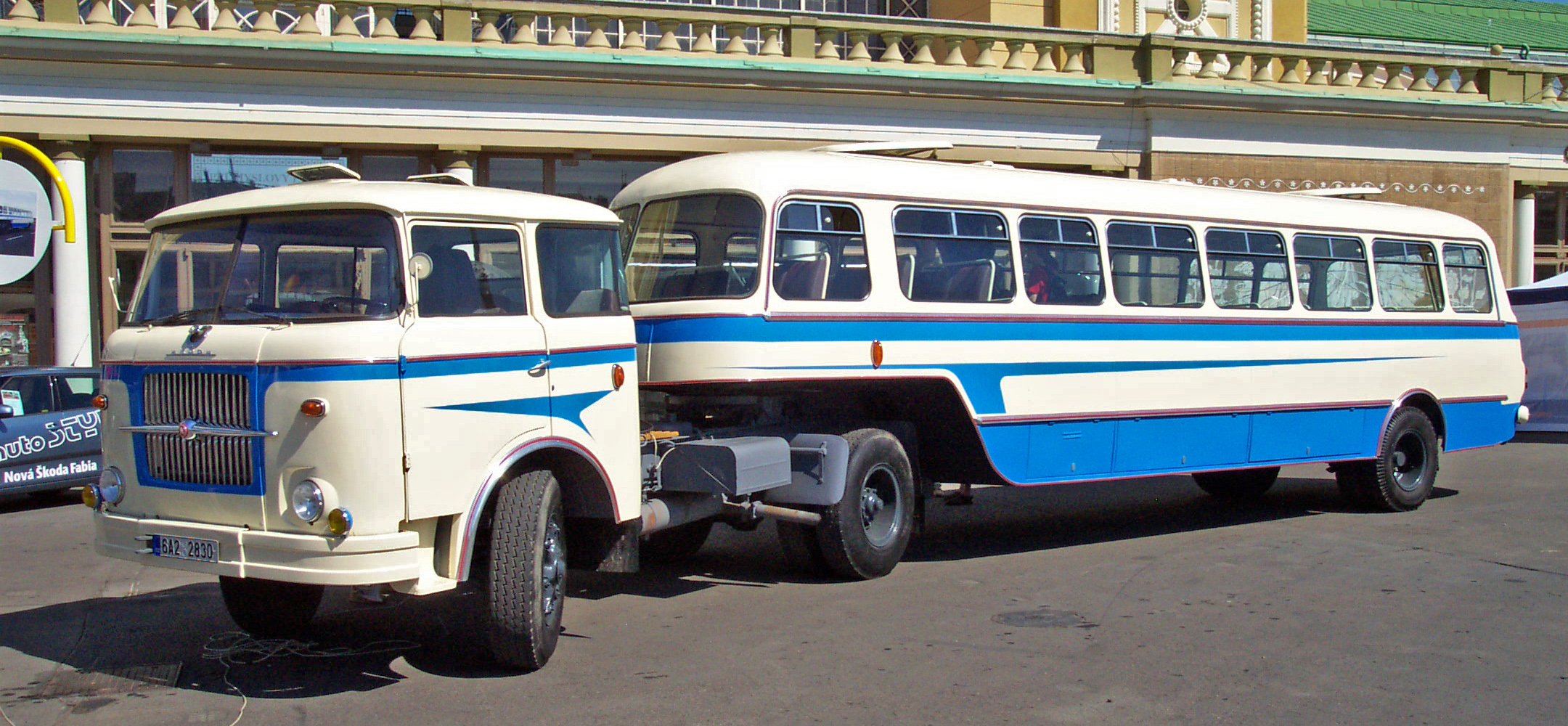
A trailer bus (Karosa NO 80) exhibited in Prague

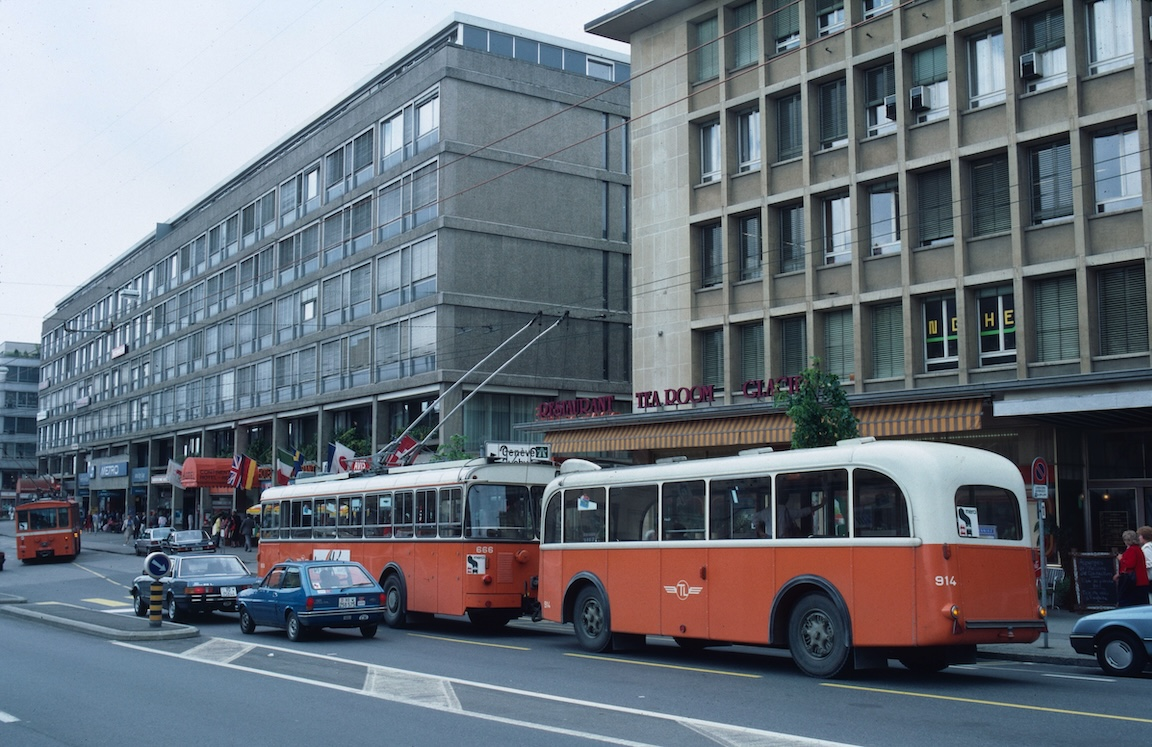
The Lausanne trolleybus system, in Switzerland, used passenger trailers with trolleybuses for 70 years. Double-articulated trolleybuses replaced the last trailers in 2021.

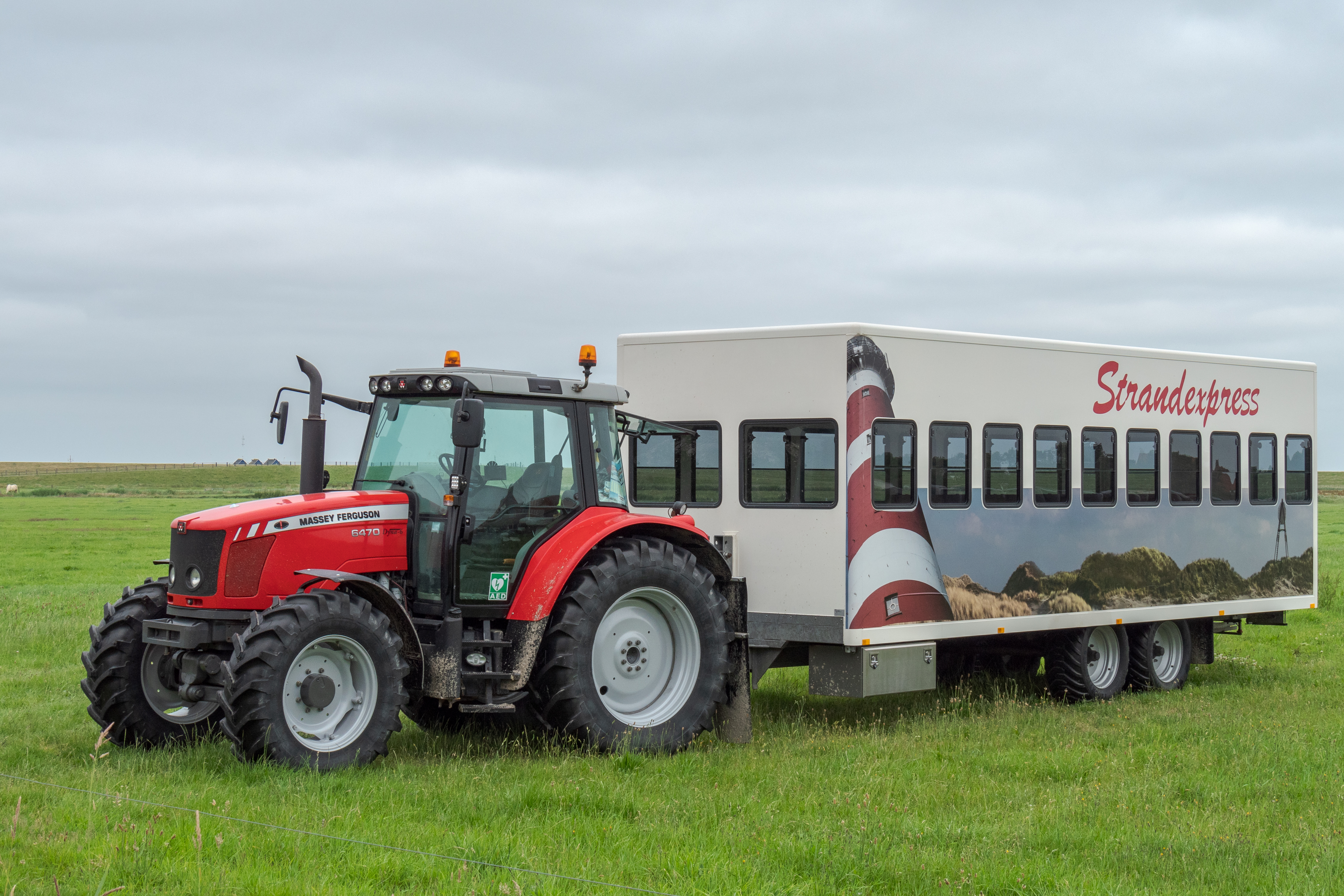
Trailer bus (powered by a farm tractor) in Friesland, the Netherlands

A trailer bus, or bus trailer, is a trailer vehicle designed specifically for the transportation of passengers (a bus). Trailer buses typically take one of two forms:

- a semi-trailer pulled by a tractor unit (in the same way as a semi-trailer truck). The tractor unit may either be a purpose-built unit designed specifically for operation with the trailer bus, or a regular conventional tractor unit.
- a full trailer pulled by a conventional bus, typically to provide extra capacity. Also referred to as a 'bus trailer'.

Although semi-trailer buses are now typically obsolete and have been retired, full trailer buses attached to conventional buses remain in use in limited applications around the world, including as tourist vehicles.

== History ==
In 1922 a 65-seater passenger trailer bus went into service for the Department of Parks and Boulevard of Detroit, United States, which was developed by Fruehauf Trailer Corporation, also from Detroit. The bus was 8.8 metres (29 ft) long, made up of steel chassis and cabin built of natural oak with tram-like interior. For comfort the trailer had leaf spring suspension, air vents and four doors for easy access, the doors were interconnected with brakes and were controlled via the tractor unit hauling the trailer. The tractor was a six-wheeled Packard tractor unit which was coupled with the trailer via a fifth wheel, making the turning radius as small as 12 metres (39 ft).

An early trailer bus was designed in Amsterdam, Netherlands, in the 1920s as bus designs got longer. As a solution to possible grounding hazards on humped bridges, three prototypes were built in 1924, but proved to be problematic, and later converted to rigid bodies in 1927.

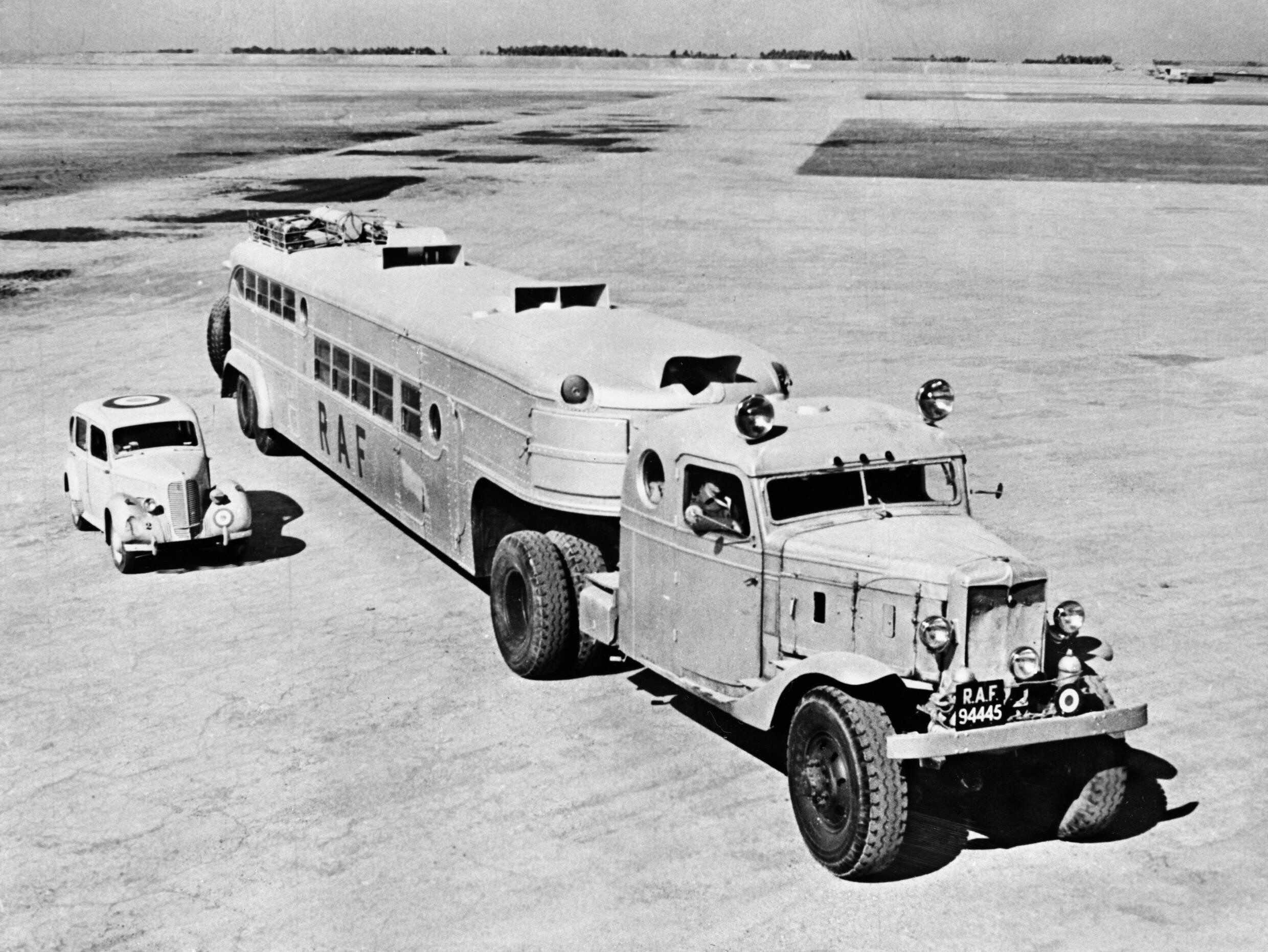
Royal Air Force trailer bus in the Middle East, 1944

In 1930 Nairn Transport Company, which ran 890 kilometres (550 mi) of transport services from Damascus, Syria, to Baghdad, Iraq, experimented with a trailer bus which was hauled by a Buick Roadster which had a very successful run. Motivated by this the company later built a customized double-decker trailer bus in 1934 which had capacity of 40 passengers divided in first class and normal class. The bus also had reclining seats, an onboard kitchen and a luggage capacity of approximately 700 kg. The trailer was hauled by a Marion-Herrington 6x6 tractor powered by a 140-kilowatt (188 hp) Hercules engine, which helped it cover the route in 24 hours. At that time, it was the longest bus ever made with a length of 24 metres (80 ft) and weighed 26 tons, making it one of the first successful trailer buses.

During World War II and in the immediate post-war years, trailer buses were turned to as a simple and economical way of providing bus transport to replace worn out conventional bus fleets. The semi-trailers were basic and uncomfortable, but each could carry more passengers than an ordinary single-decker bus, and nearly as many as a double-decker bus. In India BEST of Mumbai and BMTC of Bangalore had double-decker trailer buses in its fleet during the 1970s and 1980s.

In Australia, 123 semi-trailer type buses were built from 1939. Large purchasers included Parramatta-Ryde Bus Service and Rover Coaches. A 1947 semi-trailer coupled with an American-built 1943 White M3A1 tractor is preserved at the Sydney Bus Museum in Sydney. The Sydney exhibit was the last trailer bus used in NSW, withdrawn in 1977.

Trailer buses were also used in Perth, Western Australia, by several private bus companies from 1943 onwards, including Metro Buses (formerly Metropolitan Omnibus), Pioneer Omnibus and Scarborough Bus Services. The units were bodied by various companies, including Boltons, Campbell & Mannix and Motor Body Builders, a subsidiary of Scarborough Bus Services. From 1958 onwards, many trailer buses passed to the state-owned Metropolitan Transport Trust as the private operators were bought by the Western Australian Government. A number were also purchased by the Western Australian Government Railways from 1945 to 1948, with the trailer bodies built by Fowler Constructions and Campbell & Mannix.

In 1948, ten British-built trailer buses saw service as staff canteens for London Transport (in country green livery) with one passing to the Cobham Bus Museum in 1972.

A large order for 1,175 buses from the Dutch Railways for buses from Crossley included an order for 250 trailer buses, each to carry 52 seated and 28 standing passengers. The tractor units were delivered as short Crossley DD42s, and these were matched in the Netherlands with DAF built trailer chassis fitted with bus bodies.

From 1967 to 1968 the Indian city of Mumbai had double-decker trailer buses with seating capacity of 100 passengers, run by Brihanmumbai Electric Supply and Transport company. The city of Kolkata and Bengaluru also had such buses.

In the late 1980s, a Mexican-built trailer bus was in test service in the Los Angeles / Orange County area of California, United States. In the 1990s, Orange County Transportation Authority used it on two express routes. The trailer buses were known as Superbuses.

Custom motor/trailer units manufactured by Orion Bus Industries were used from 1985 to 2012 on the Niagara Parks Commission People Mover route in Niagara Falls, Ontario, Canada.

In Greece, trailer buses are still often used for tours, usually in small villages. Trailer buses are also used in some kids' attractions.

== Obsolescence ==
As early as the mid-1940s, trailer buses began to quickly fall out of favor for a variety of factors:

- The length of trailer buses made them difficult to negotiate sharp turns at narrow street corners;
- Each trailer bus normally required a two-person crew, with the driver in the tractor and the conductor in the semi-trailer;
- The perceived danger of a passenger-laden semi-trailer dislodging from its tractor while under way has led to many jurisdictions in the United States, Canada and Australia restricting or prohibiting trailer buses.

Trailer buses saw service until at least 1984 in South Africa, possibly due to the rugged terrain in its remote areas, and the availability of specialist bus builders as opposed to truck dealers and basic body builders.

Trailer buses are still in service in Cuba, where they were introduced under the nickname of "camellos" ("camels", from the twin-humped shape of the trailers) during the Special Period after the fall of the Soviet Union. As of 2008, the trailer buses were being gradually retired from service in Havana, replaced by Chinese-made buses.

Nonetheless, the Munich transit authority ordered a batch of trailer buses from Solaris with deliveries starting in 2013. The buses were intended for service on the city's busiest routes. The advantages of such buses were the ability to attach or detach the trailer depending on demand, spaciousness and flexibility.

Munich is experimenting with "bus trains" on heavily used routes as it electrifies its bus fleet. One design by MVG has solar panels on the roof and the trailer is made by Göppel. The interest is how much of the demand for electricity for interior systems can be supplied by the solar panels. Some are conversions of buses in their fleet.

== Gallery ==
=== Semi-trailer buses ===
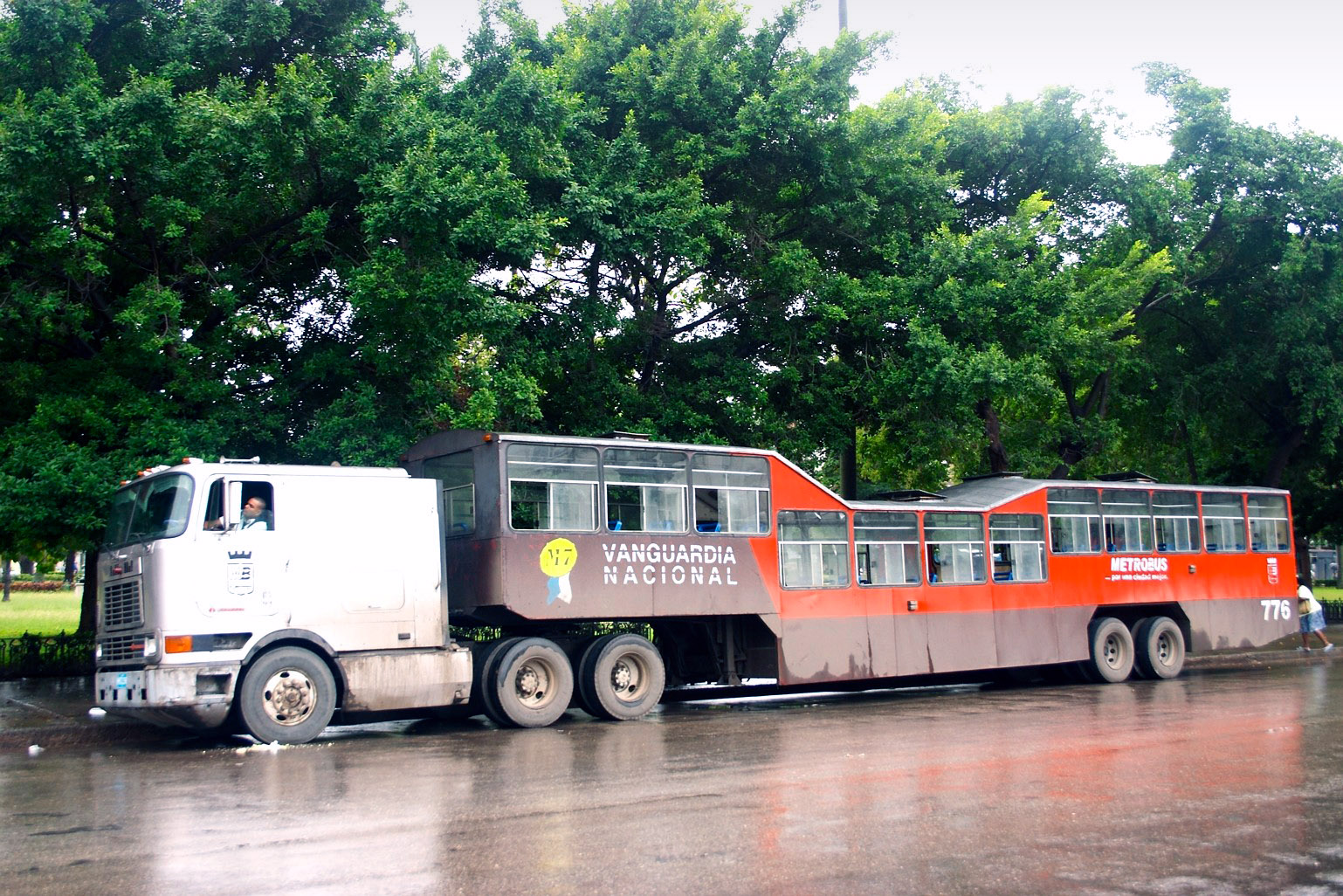
A camel bus in Havana

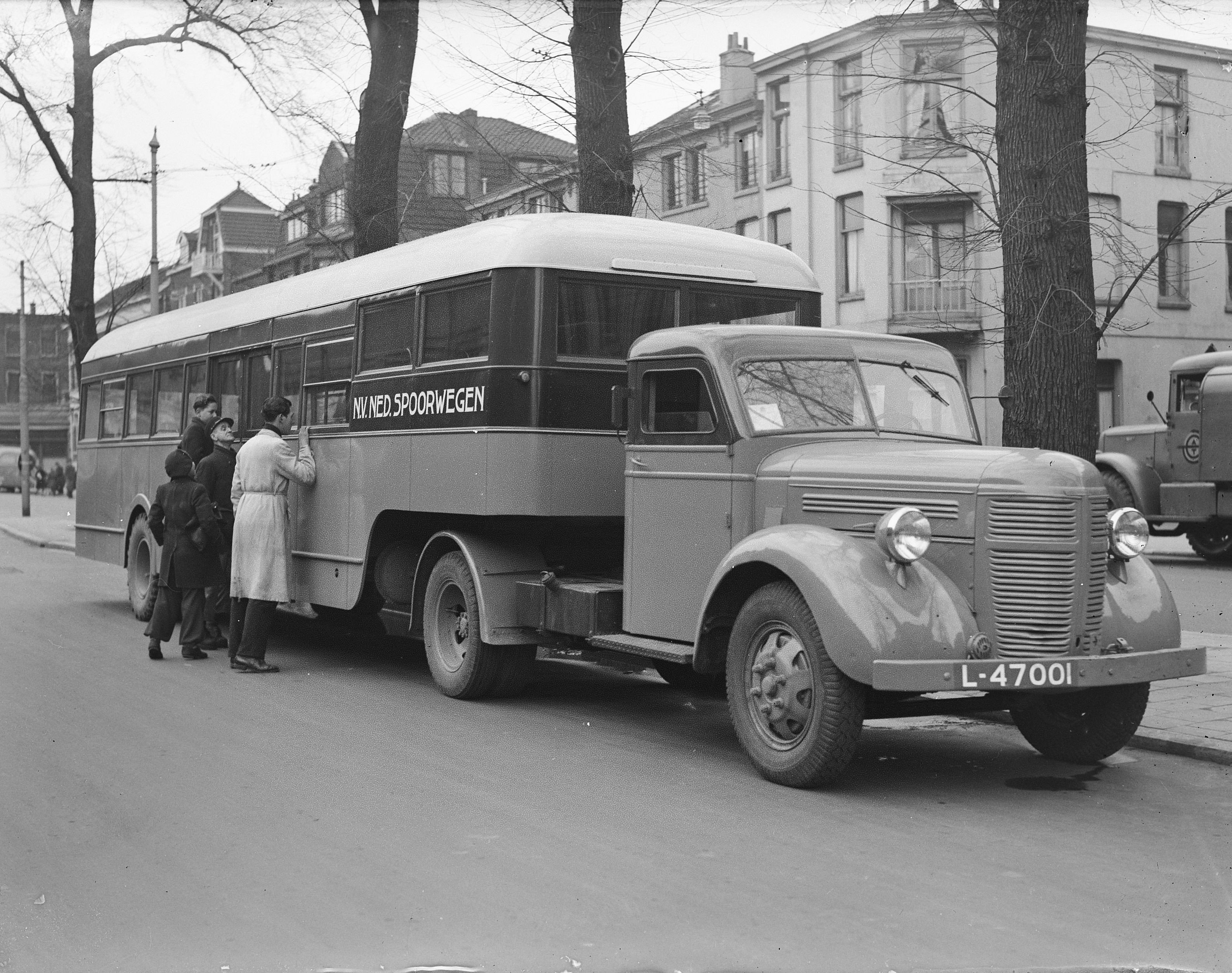
Trailer bus based on Dodge truck

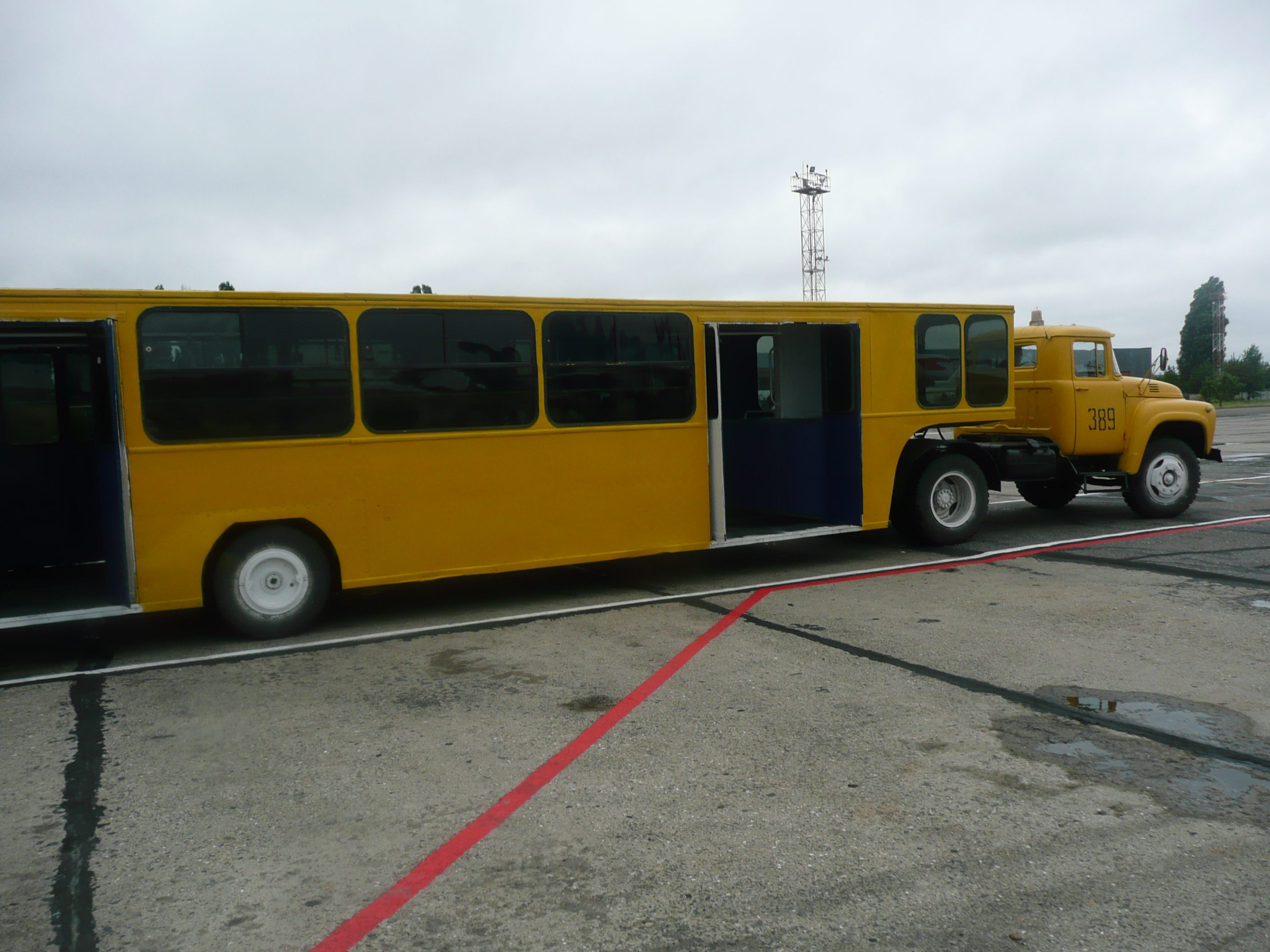
A trailer bus at Odesa International Airport

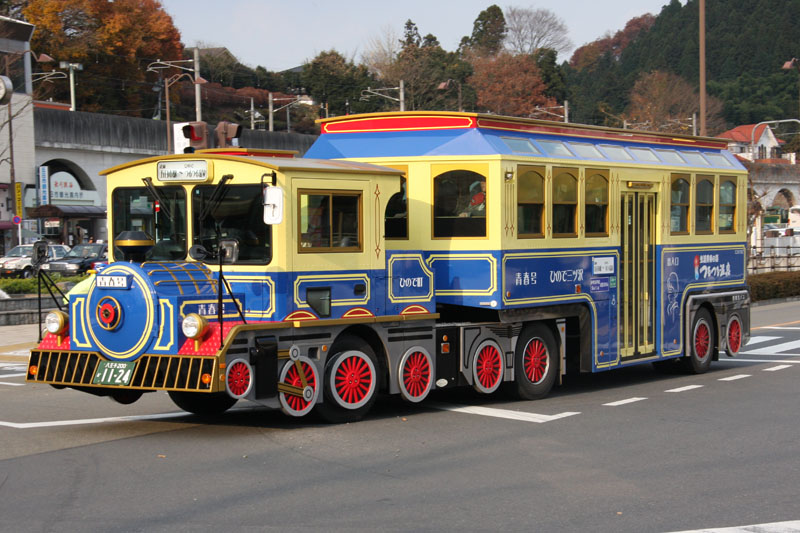
A Hino Ranger trailer bus with a tractor unit looking like a locomotive

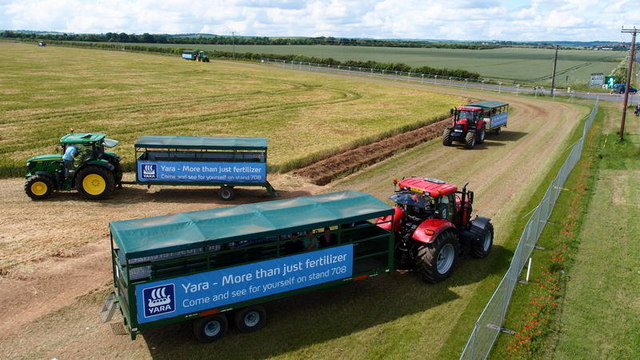
Trailer buses (pulled by farm tractors) in the United Kingdom

=== Full trailer buses ===
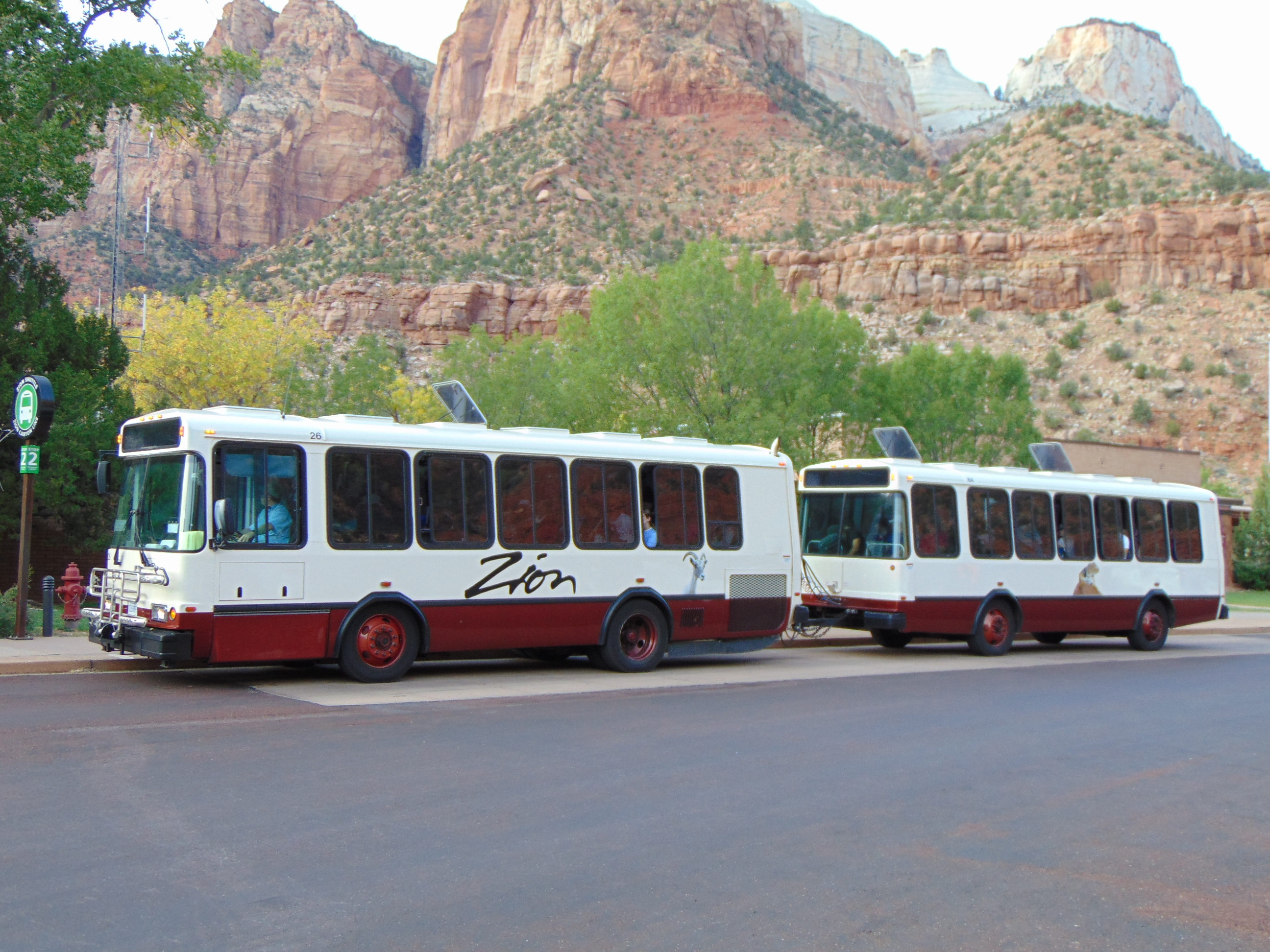
A tourist shuttle bus service in use at Zion National Park

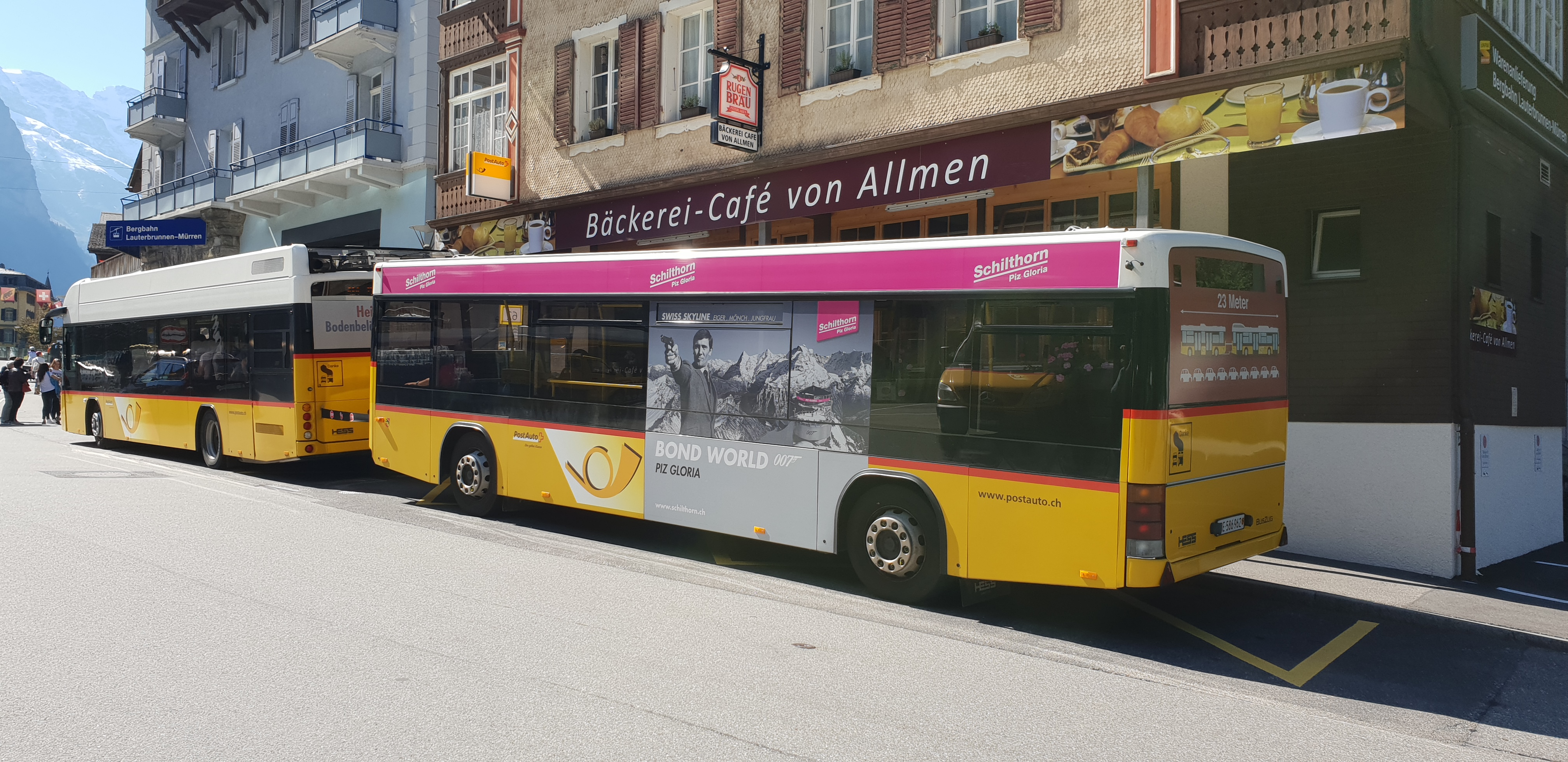
A bus trailer in use in Lauterbrunnen, Switzerland

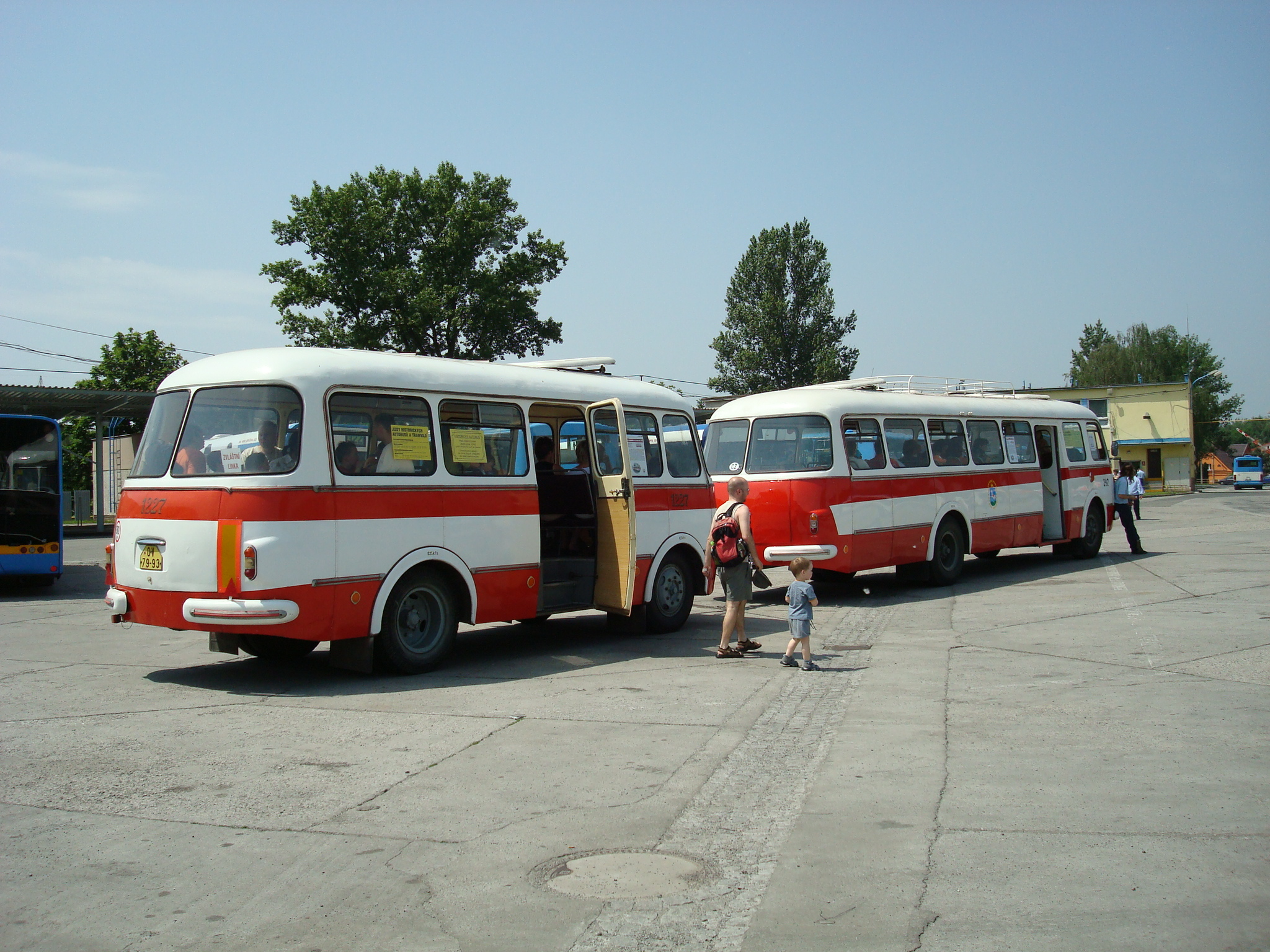
A historic bus trailer in Ostrava, Czech Republic

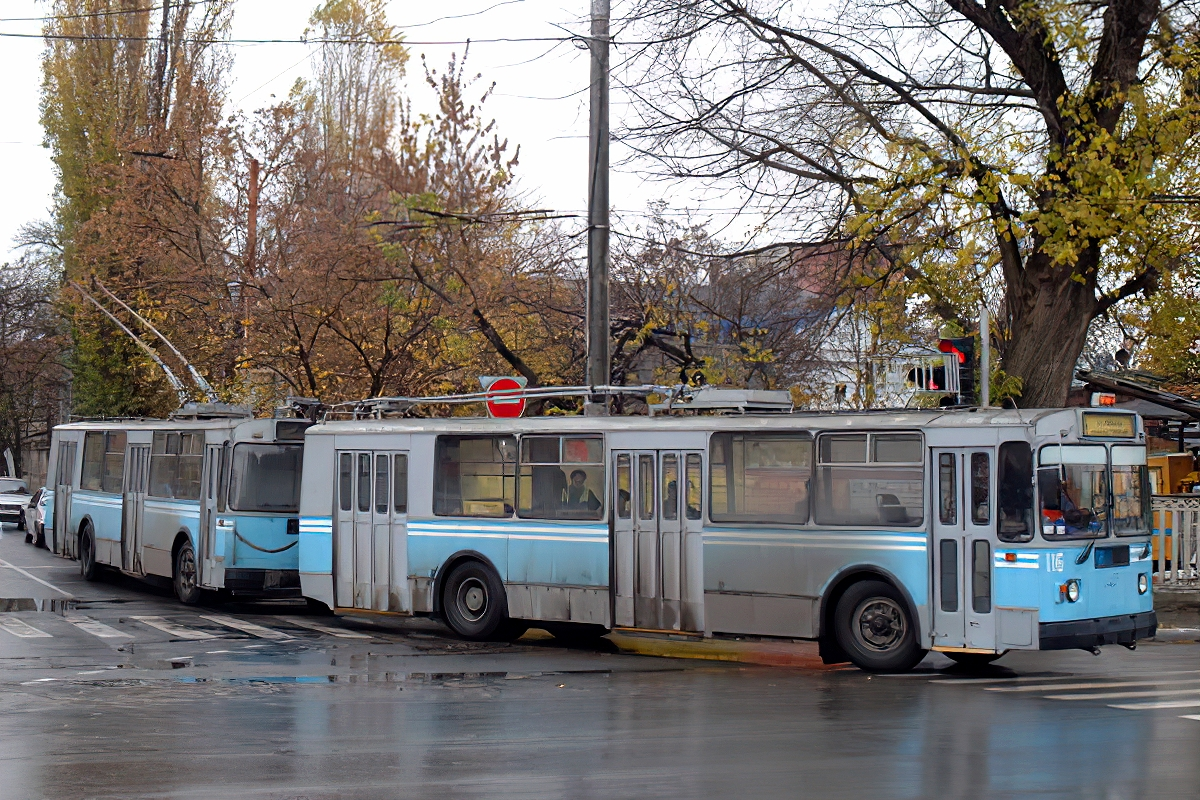
Two coupled ZiU-9 trolleybuses in Krasnodar, with the second unit converted into a trailer
