= Iveco Metro =

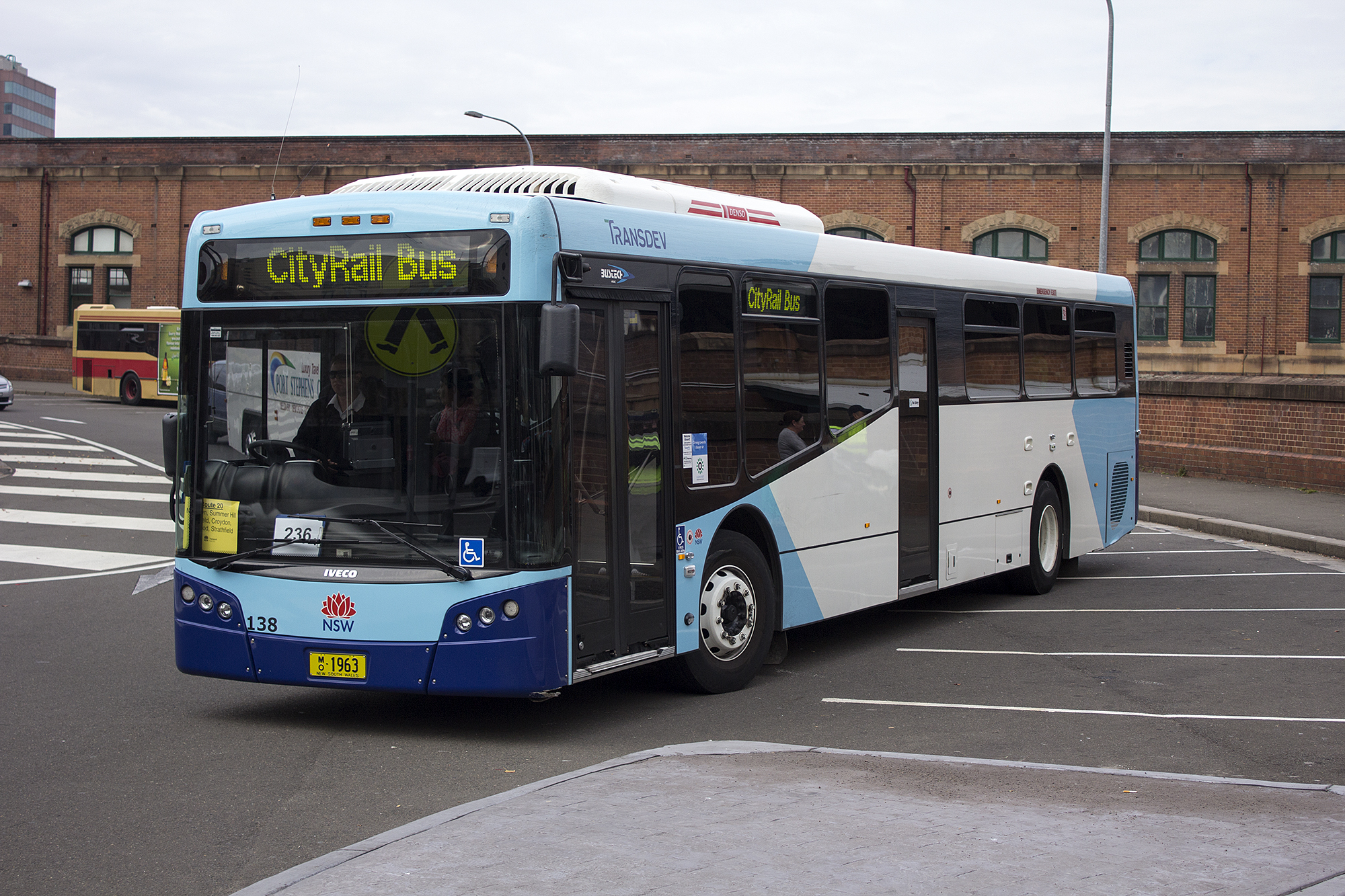
- Transdev Shorelink Bustech-bodied Iveco Metro at Sydney Central station in July 2013

Overview
- Manufacturer: Iveco Bus
- Production: 2005–2017
- Assembly: Dandenong, Australia

Body and chassis
- Class: Bus chassis
- Doors: 1-2
- Floor type: Low entry

Powertrain
- Engine: Cummins ISLe
- Capacity: 8.9 litres
- Transmission: Allison T375R

Dimensions
- Length: 10.85 m (35.6 ft); 12 m (39.4 ft)
- Width: 2.5 m (8.2 ft)
- Height: 3.3 m (10.8 ft)

Chronology
- Predecessor: Irisbus Agora; Irisbus Citelis

The Iveco Metro is a low-entry single-decker bus chassis manufactured by Iveco Bus in Dandenong, Victoria for the Australian market.

It has been purchased by a number of Australian operators including Carbridge, Coastal Liner, Green's Northern Coaches, Grenda's Bus Service, Ivanhoe Bus Company, Moonee Valley Coaches, Red Bus Services, State Transit, Telford's Bus & Coach, Torrens Transit and Transdev Shorelink.
