= Green's Northern Coaches =

Australian transport company

- Parent: Rod Green
- Commenced operation: August 1973
- Ceased operation: February 2015
- Headquarters: Thirroul
- Service area: Wollongong
- Service type: Bus operator
- Routes: 2
- Depots: 2
- Fleet: 18 (February 2015)
- Website: www.greensnortherncoaches.com.au

Green's Northern Coaches was an Australian bus company operating services in Wollongong.

== History ==
In August 1973, Rod Green purchased route 2 Wollongong - Stanwell Park from Hill's Bus Service with six buses. On 1 January 1992, the Helensburgh Bus Service business was purchased from Colin Crossley with route 15 Helensburgh - Stanwell Park with five buses. In February 2015, the business was sold to the Premier Transport Group and rebranded Premier Charters.

== Services ==
From 2008 until February 2015, Green's services were part of Sydney Outer Metropolitan Bus Region 9.

Green's operated 2 routes in the northern suburbs of Wollongong and the southern part of the Royal National Park:

- 2: Stanwell Park - Wollongong
- 15: Helensburgh station - Stanwell Park

== Fleet ==
As at February 2015, the fleet consisted of 18 buses and coaches. The fleet livery was green and white. In 2011, the Transport for NSW white and blue livery was adopted for route buses.

== Depots ==
Green's operated depots in Helensburgh and Thirroul.
