= Buslines Group =

Australian bus operator in New South Wales

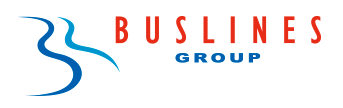

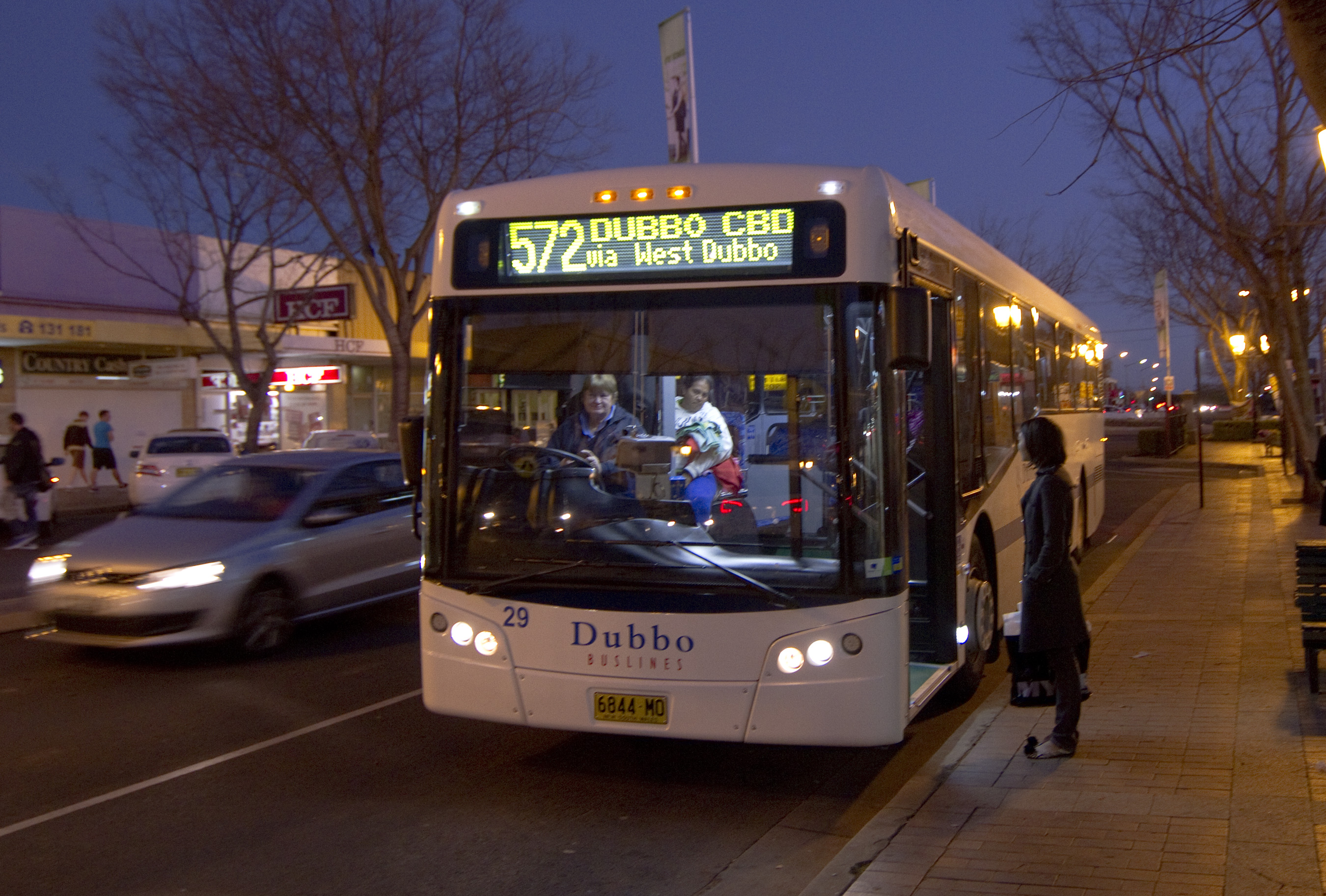
- Dubbo Buslines Bustech bodied Mercedes-Benz OC 500 LE in August 2013
- Parent: Frank D'Apuzzo; Peter Simpson
- Commenced operation: 1926
- Headquarters: Burwood
- Service area: New South Wales
- Service type: Bus operator
- Depots: 13
- Fleet: 401 (October 2019)
- Operator: Ballina Buslines; Bathurst Buslines; Berrima Buslines; Dubbo Buslines; Forster Buslines; Griffith Buslines; Lithgow Buslines; Northern Rivers Buslines; Orange Buslines; Tamworth Buslines; Ulladulla Buslines; Wingham Buslines; Rover Coaches
- Website: www.buslinesgroup.com.au

The Buslines Group is an Australian bus operator in New South Wales and is the third largest private bus operator in New South Wales.

== History ==
=== John A Gilbert Group ===
The John A Gilbert group was founded in March 1926 by John A Gilbert as Reo Motors, being renamed in 1951. Initially a motor dealer, in 1941 it diversified into operating bus services. Its first operation was in Parkes followed by Bathurst, Dubbo, Goulburn, Mittagong, Orange and Tamworth. It also operated services in Sydney with suburban companies in Bronte, Ramsgate and Matraville. Most of these were sold over the years, with only Mittagong, Orange and Tamworth remaining by 1980. From 1954 until 1982 it was listed on the Sydney Stock Exchange.

In November 1988, the Lismore based business of Kirklands Omnibus Services was purchased taking the fleet to 250 vehicles. In October 1992 Sydney operator Shorelink was purchased.

In March 1996, John A Gilbert sold its remaining bus operations to Frank D'Apuzzo and Peter Simpson. In March 2000 Picton Omnibus Service was purchased. In September 2001, Shorelink was sold to Transdev.

=== Buslines brand ===
From 2004 the Buslines brand was rolled out across all operations. In June 2006, Ritchies Bus Service, Griffith was purchased, followed by Perrett's Coach Service, Werris Creek in April 2008 and Selwood Coaches, Orange in December 2009, these latter two being integrated into the Tamworth, Orange and Dubbo operations.

In April 2012, the business of Jones Brothers, Lithgow and Bathurst was purchased, the latter having previously been part of the group until sold in 1977.

In October 2015, the Forster Bus Service and Wingham Coaches businesses were purchased with 41 buses.

On 3 December 2018, Ulladulla Bus Lines was acquired with the name changing to Ulladula Buslines

Buslines co-owner Peter Simpson died in May 2020.

== Current operations ==
=== Ballina Buslines / Northern Rivers Buslines ===
In 1939, Clarrie and Jim Kirkland purchased two bus runs in Evans Head. Trading as Kirkland Bros, further operations would be purchased in the Northern Rivers region. In January 1970, the business of New England Motor Company which operated long-distance services from Lismore to Brisbane, Tenterfield and Grafton. By this stage, the fleet stood at 45.

In November 1974, a service commenced from Ballina to Sydney. It was later extended to Brisbane. In 1986, the business was sold to Waugh & Josephson which in turn was sold to Bond Corporation in 1987. Kirkland Bros was sold to John A Gilbert in 1988. As at August 1989, the fleet comprised 111 buses and coaches.

In June 1996, the Brisbane to Sydney services were sold to Premier Motor Service who in April 2008, also purchased the Lismore to Brisbane service. In the 2000s, the Kirklands name was dropped with the business split into Ballina Buslines and Northern Rivers Buslines.

In June 2019 route 650 of Wallers Buslines to Nimbin was taken over and incorporated in Northern River Buslines.

=== Bathurst Buslines ===
Having been owned by John A Gilbert until sold to Warren Bremner in June 1977, the Buslines Group purchased the Bathurst business from Jones Bros in April 2012.

=== Berrima Buslines ===
The Berrima business is the depot with the highest quantity of buses.

=== Dubbo Buslines ===
Having earlier sold the business, in July 1985 John A Gilbert purchased the Dubbo business from the Stonestreet family.

=== Forster Buslines ===
Forster Bus Service was purchased on 1 October 2015 from the Deane family and rebranded Forster Buslines.

=== Griffith Buslines ===
Ritchies Bus Service was founded by Jock Ritchie in Griffith in March 1937, being taken over by son John in 1958. It was sold to Buslines Group on 1 October 2006 and rebranded Griffith Buslines.

=== Lithgow Buslines ===
Established in 1922 by Lewis and Maurice Jones, Jones Bros, Lithgow was purchased by the Buslines Group in April 2012.

=== Orange Buslines ===
In 1946, the Orange business was purchased from John Foley with eight buses, with Foley's Bus Service purchasing route 32 Kogarah station to Ramsgate in return.

=== Tamworth Buslines ===
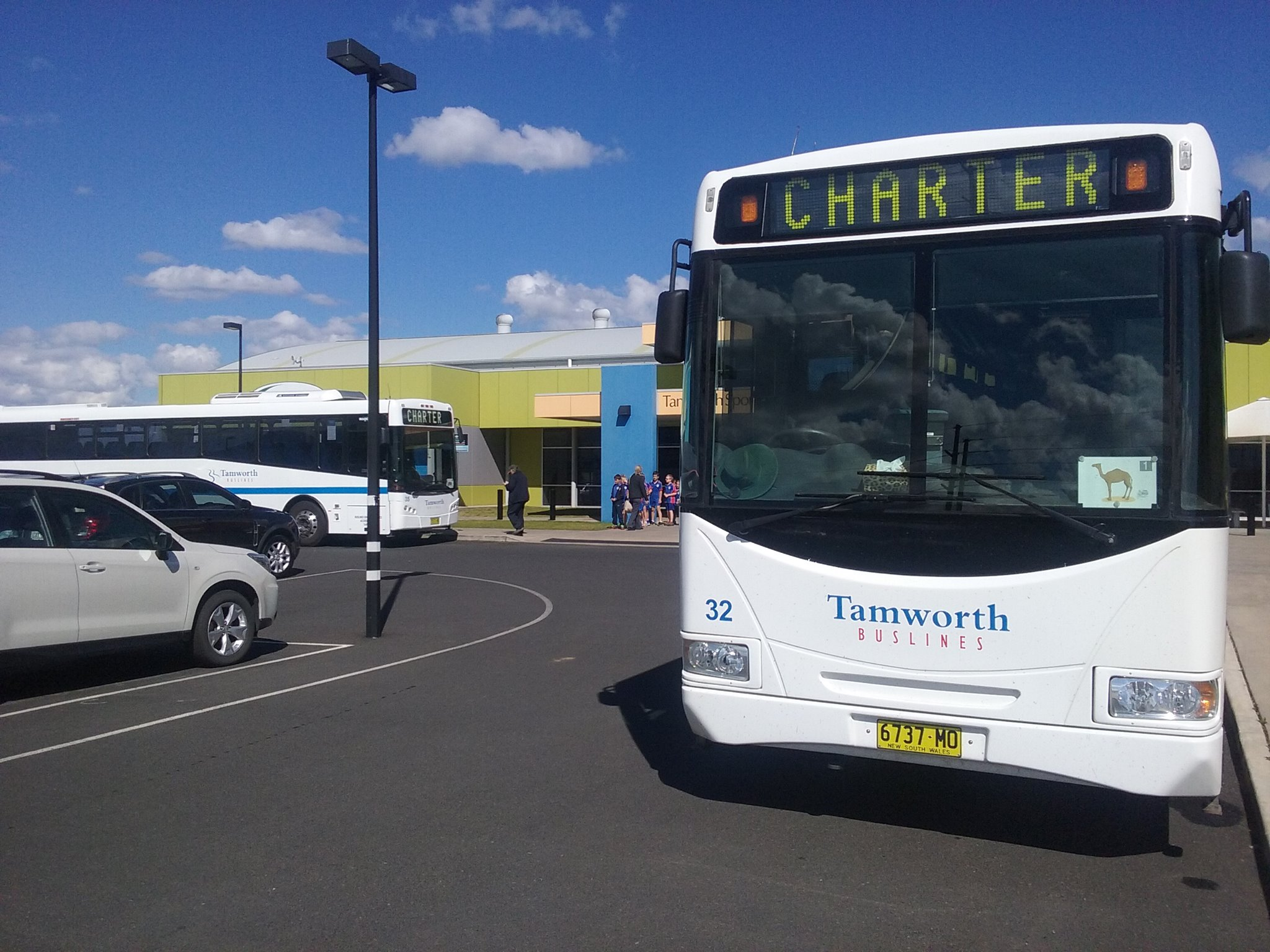
Tamworth Buslines Bustech bodied Volvo B7R

The Tamworth business was acquired in December 1943 from Herbert Smith. Tamworth was the first depot to be operated by John A Gilbert, and the starting ground for bus operations. On 14 April 2008, Perrett's Coach Service of Werris Creek was purchased in April 2008 with 15 vehicles.

=== Ulladulla Buslines ===
Ulladulla Bus Lines was established in Ulladulla by John Owens, being sold in 1969 to David Bray with five buses. It was purchased by Buslines Australia on 3 December 2018 with 17 vehicles.

=== Wingham Buslines ===
Wingham Coaches was purchased on 1 October 2015 from the Deane family and rebranded Wingham Buslines.

=== Rover Coaches ===
Buslines purchased Rover Coaches in December 2022. The Rover name will be retained.

== Fleet ==
As at October 2019, the fleet consisted of 401 buses.

=== Livery ===
Up until the mid-1980s the John A Gilbert fleet were painted white and black. This was then replaced by a white background, and three blue stripes going from dark to light. This was then simplified when Buslines Group took over to a single dark blue stripe on a white background.

== Former operations ==
=== Sydney bus operations ===
In 1956 John A Gilbert sold route 81 in Sydney from Fairfield to Cabramatta to Katen & Heath.

=== Picton Buslines ===
The Picton business was purchased on 29 March 2000 from George Lee (Picton Omnibus Service) acquiring 23 vehicles. Picton Buslines left the Buslines Group in September 2021 after its ownership was passed to the Ferris family. The business now operates as an independent entity with the same name but a different logo.

=== Shorelink ===
In October 1992 Sydney operator Shorelink was purchased. In September 2001 it was sold to Transdev.

=== Dealerships ===
In 1939 John A Gilbert became a GMC dealer. It relinquished its GMC dealership in 1958. It would later become a distributor of Bedford, Isuzu, International, Isuzu, MAN, Mercedes-Benz, Nissan and RFW operating out of Guildford. It closed its dealership in 1999.

It previously owned Holden car dealerships in Parramatta and Waitara.
