= P&D Coachworks =

Australian bus manufacturer

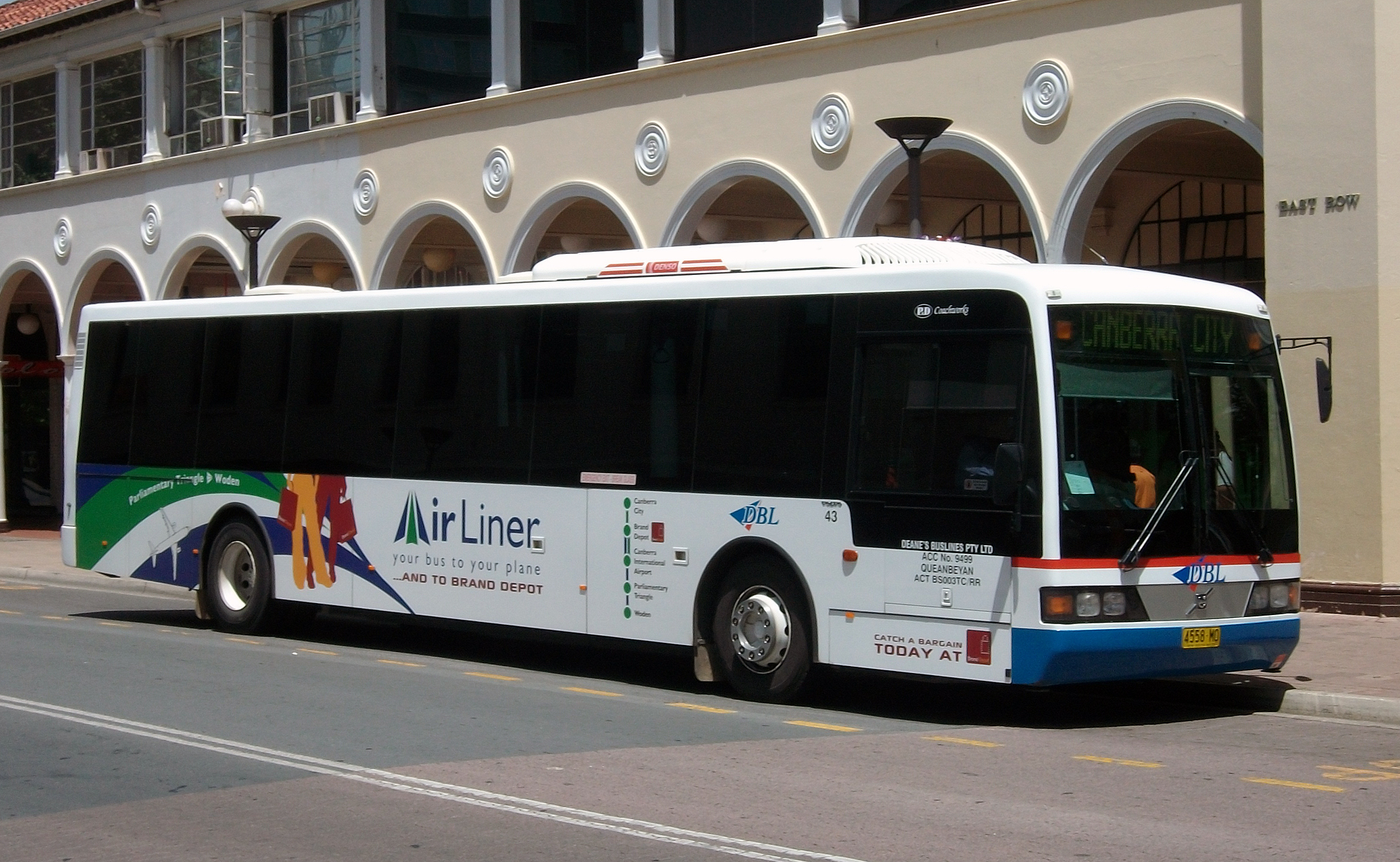
- Deane's Buslines Volvo B7RLE in Canberra in November 2009
- Industry: Bus manufacturing
- Founded: 1988
- Founder: Paul McGavin
- Headquarters: Murwillumbah, Australia
- Website: www.pdcoachworks.com

P&D Coachworks is an Australian bus bodybuilder in Murwillumbah, New South Wales.

== History ==
In 1988, former Denning employee Paul McGavin founded P&D Body Repairs in Tweed Heads West before relocating to Murwillumbah and in 1990 diversified into bus body manufacturing bodying a Hino.

Initially bodying school buses, in 1993, it bodied five Volvo B59 city buses for Hopkinsons. In February 1995 it completed its first coach.
