= Express Coach Builders =

Australian bus bodybuilder

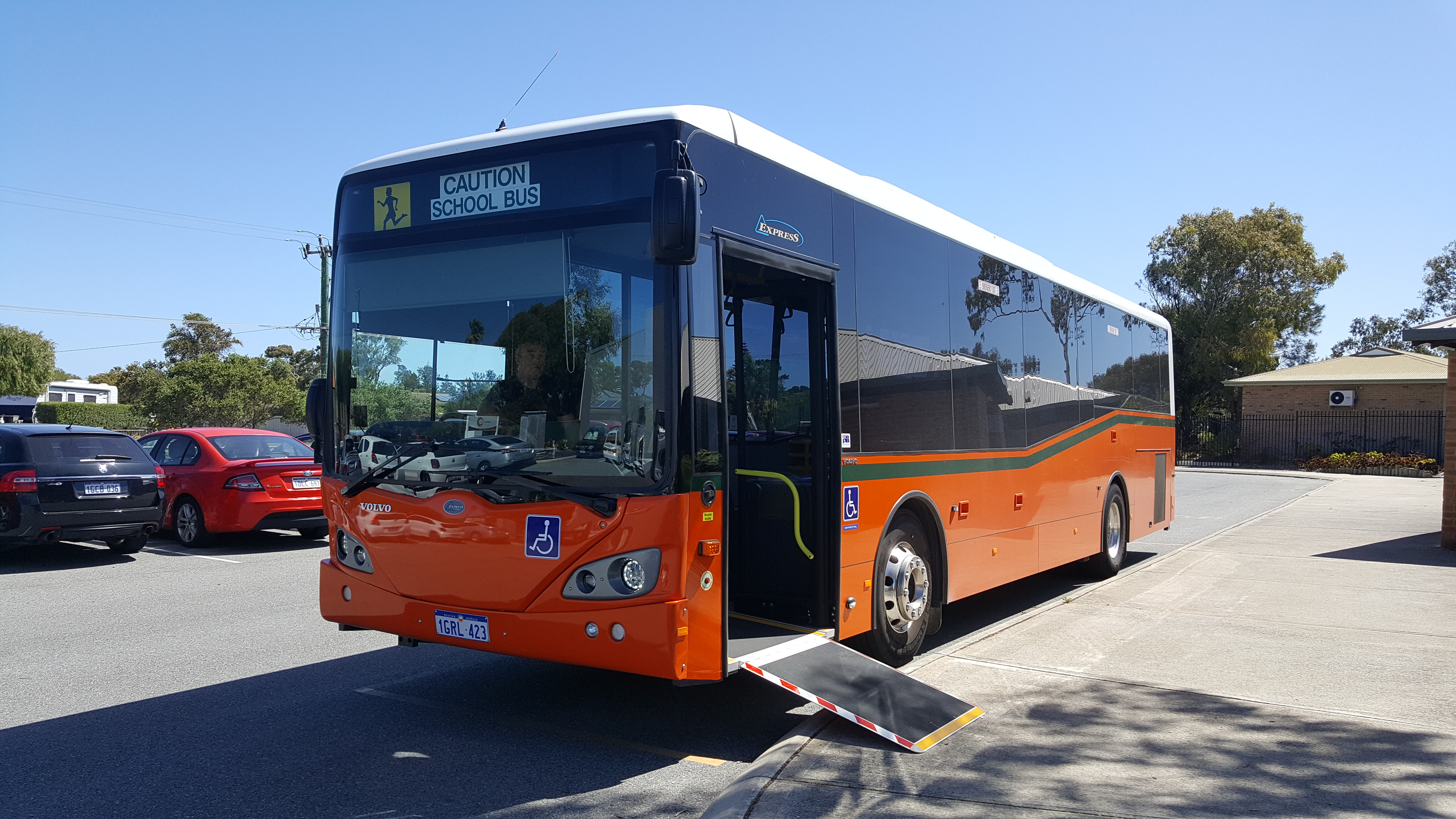
- Express bodied Volvo B8RLE
- Formerly: Nambucca River Engineering
- Industry: Bus manufacturing
- Founded: 1971
- Founder: John Bishop; Geoff Christian
- Headquarters: Macksville, Australia
- Website: expresscoachbuilders.com

Express Coach Builders, formerly Nambucca River Engineering, is an Australian bus bodybuilder in Macksville.

== History ==
Express Coach Builders was formed as Nambucca River Engineering in 1971. It initially manufactured custom bodies on mid-sized Austin chassis. It first full size body was on an Albion Viking in 1972.

In April 1995, it was placed in administration with Ferrier Hodgson appointed as administrator. In August 1995, it was sold to Pepe Bonaccordo and Lloyd Ilett and renamed Express Coach Builders.

In 2014, the factory moved from McKay Street to Kylie Street in Macksville's south. In August 2016, it completed its 1,000th vehicle.
