= Campbell =

Campbell may refer to:

== People ==
=== Surname ===
- Campbell (surname), includes a list of people with the surname Campbell

=== Given name ===
- Campbell Brown (footballer), an Australian rules footballer
- Campbell Brown (journalist) (born 1968), American television news reporter and anchor
- Campbell Cowan Edgar (1870–1938), Scottish Egyptologist and Secretary-General of the Egyptian Museum at Cairo
- Campbell Jackson (born 1981), Northern Irish darts player
- Campbell Johnstone (born 1980), New Zealand rugby union player
- Campbell Lake (footballer) (born 2004), Australian rules footballer
- Stretch Miller (Campbell A. Miller, 1910–1972), American sportscaster
- Campbell Money (born 1960), Scottish footballer
- Campbell Newman (born 1963), Australian politician
- Campbell Scott (born 1961), American actor, director, and voice artist

== Places ==
In Australia:

- Campbell, Australian Capital Territory, a suburb of Canberra, Australia

In Canada:

- Campbell, Nova Scotia, on Cape Breton Island Nova Scotia
- Campbell Branch Little Black River, South of Quebec, Canada (and Maine)
- Campbell Road, Edmonton, Alberta

In Malta:

- Fort Campbell (Malta), a former fort in Mellieħa, Malta

In New Zealand:

- Campbell Islands, a sub-Antarctic group of islands in New Zealand

In South Africa:

- Campbell, Northern Cape, a town in the Northern Cape Province of South Africa

In the United States:

- Campbell, Alabama
- Campbell, California, city in Santa Clara County
- Campbell, Florida, census-designated place and an unincorporated community in Osceola County
- Campbell Branch Little Black River, North of Maine, and South of Quebec, in Canada
- Campbell, Michigan, an unincorporated community
- Campbell, Minnesota, city in Wilkin County
- Campbell, Missouri, city in Dunklin County
- Campbell, Nebraska, village in Franklin County
- Campbell, New York, town in Steuben County
  - Campbell (CDP), New York, the main hamlet in the town
- Campbell, North Dakota, alternate name for Kintyre
- Campbell, Ohio, city in Mahoning County
- Campbell, Texas, city in Hunt County
- Campbell, Wisconsin, town in La Crosse County
- Campbell Corner, Missouri, extinct hamlet in Holt County
- Campbell County (disambiguation), several counties
- Campbell Township (disambiguation), several townships
- Campbell University, a Baptist school in Buies Creek, North Carolina
- Fort Campbell, Kentucky, a large U.S. army base

=== Non-terrestrial ===
- Campbell (lunar crater)
- Campbell (Martian crater)
- 2751 Campbell, an asteroid

== Other uses ==
- Campbell's, well-known American producer of canned soups and related products
- Campbell diagram, a plot of natural frequency versus rotor speed used to determine critical speeds in rotordynamics
- Campbell College, a school in Northern Ireland
- Campbell Saunders, fictional character in Degrassi
- Campbell Motor Car Company, a short-lived American automobile manufacturer
- Campbell Motor Industries, a vehicle assembler in New Zealand

== See also ==
- Clan Campbell, a Scottish clan
- Clan Campbell of Cawdor, a Scottish clan (armigerous clan)
- Campbell of Craignish, a family branch of Clan Campbell
- Campbells of Strachur, a family branch of Clan Campbell
- Campbellford, Ontario, Canada
- Campbelltown (disambiguation)
- Campbellton (disambiguation)
- Campbell High School (disambiguation)
- Campbell Island (disambiguation)
- Justice Campbell (disambiguation)
