= Caimbeul =

Caimbeul is a surname. Notable people with the surname include:

- Alexander Campbell (disambiguation), several people named Alexander Campbell
- Aonghas Pàdraig Caimbeul (born 1952), Scottish award-winning poet, novelist, journalist, broadcaster and actor
- Cailean Mor Caimbeul (died 1296), also known as Sir Colin Campbell, one of the earliest attested members of Clan Campbell
- Maoilios Caimbeul (born 1944), award-winning Scottish writer of poetry, prose and children's literature
- Niall Caimbeul, several people named Neil Campbell
- Niall Caimbeul (bishop) (died 1613), the son of Alasdair mac a' Phearsain, a member of the Campbells of Carnassarie
- Tormod Caimbeul (1942–2015), Scottish Gaelic writer

== See also ==
- Cambell (disambiguation)
- Cambil
- Campbell (disambiguation)
- Campel
- Cumbel
