= Campbeltown (disambiguation) =

Campbeltown is a town on the Kintyre peninsula, Argyll and Bute, Scotland.

Campbeltown may also refer to:

== Places ==
- Campbeltown of Ardersier near Inverness, Scotland
- Campbeltown (Parliament of Scotland constituency), constituency electing a Commissioner to the Estates of Scotland, 1700-1707

== Ships ==
- HMS Campbeltown, Royal Navy ships named after the town

== Other uses ==
- Campbeltown railway station, former light railway station in Campbeltown
- Campbeltown Airport, at Machrihanish, west of Campbeltown
- Campbeltown single malts, Whisky distilled in Campbeltown
- Campbeltown Loch, may refer to the loch or the song

== See also ==
- Campbelltown (disambiguation)
- Campbellton (disambiguation)
