= Campbell Township, Indiana =

Campbell Township is the name of two townships in the U.S. state of Indiana:

- Campbell Township, Jennings County, Indiana
- Campbell Township, Warrick County, Indiana

== See also ==
- Campbell Township (disambiguation).
