= Interline Bus Services =

Australian bus company

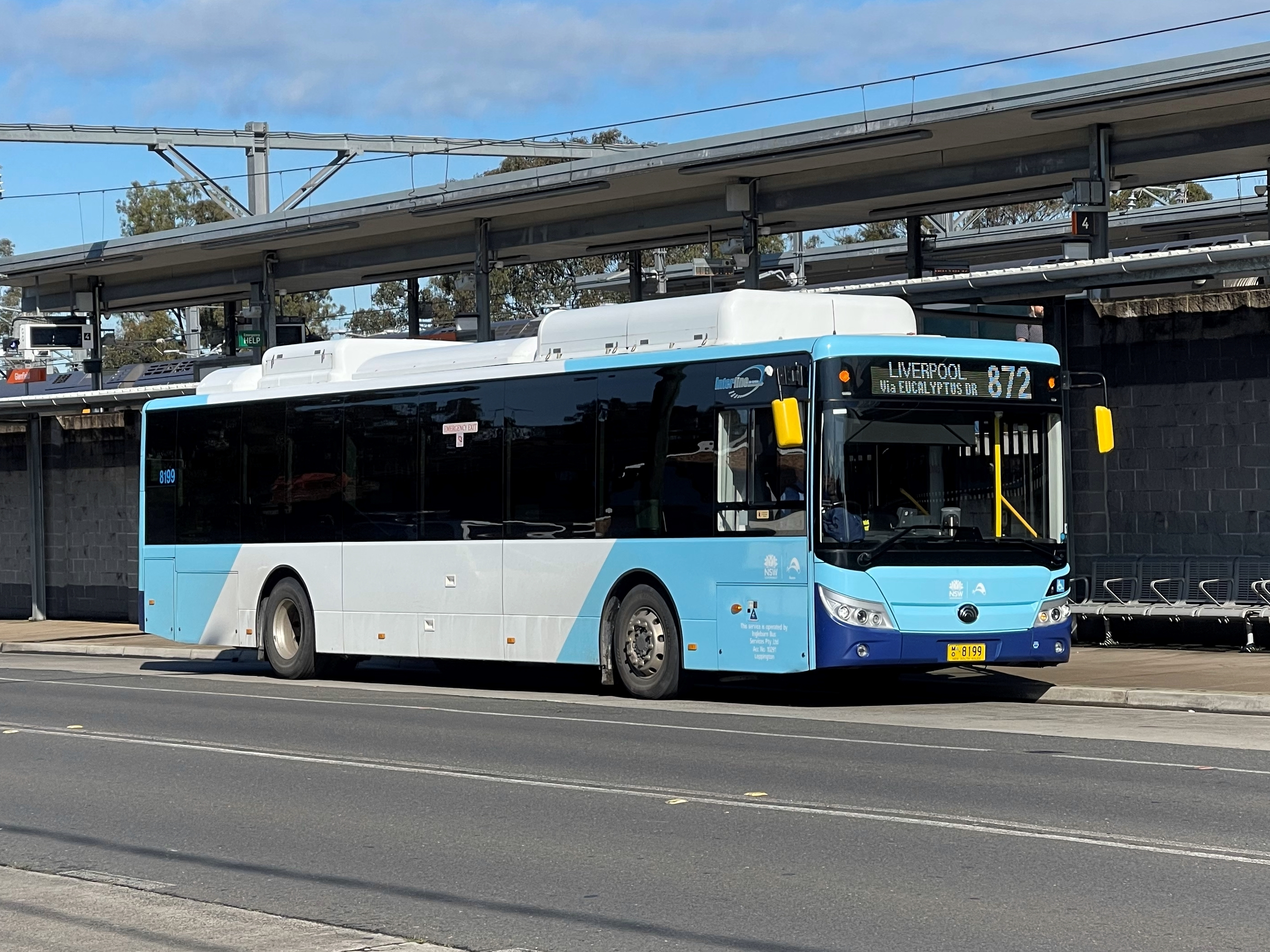
- Interline Yutong E12 in September 2022
- Commenced operation: 1961
- Ceased operation: 7 October 2023
- Headquarters: Macquarie Fields
- Service area: South West Sydney
- Service type: Bus services
- Depots: 2
- Fleet: 119 (September 2023)
- Website: www.interlinebus.com.au

Interline Bus Services was an Australian bus company which operated services in South West Sydney.

== History ==
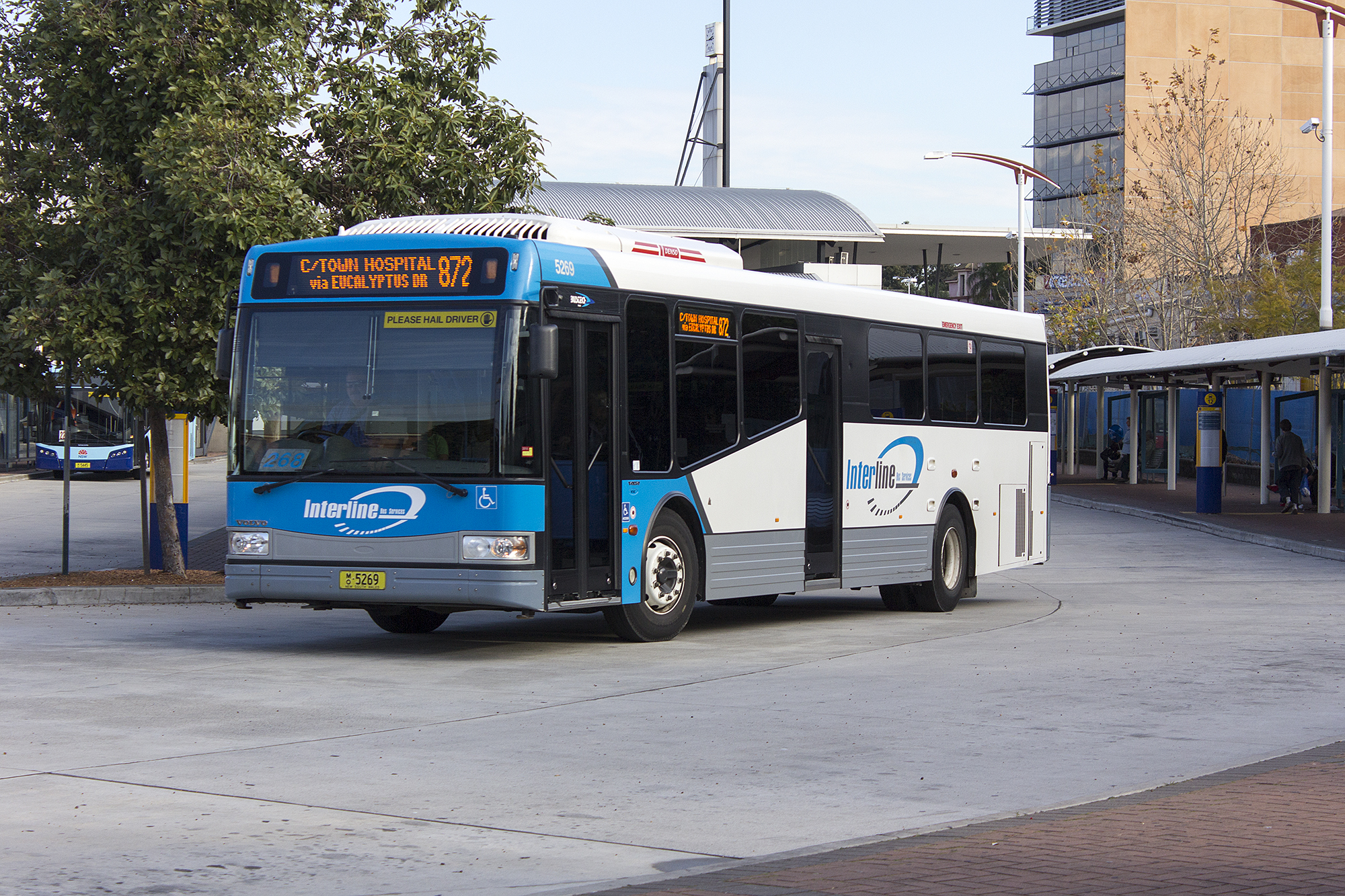
Bustech bodied Volvo B7RLE in old livery at Liverpool station in July 2013

Interline Bus Services was formed when the Oliveri family purchased route 102 Campbelltown – Macquarie Fields from Herbert Harrison on 1 September 1961.

On 1 June 1989, it merged with Oliveri's Transport Service, Green Valley with both renamed Metro-link Bus Lines. In August 1992, it was separated from Oliveri Metro-link operation when the founding Oliveri families parted company and the family of the late John Oliveri acquired all the shares in Ingleburn Bus Services Pty Ltd and started trading as Interline Bus Services.

In August 2002, Southern Cross Transit, Karalee, was purchased by the Oliveri family and is now the sister company of Interline.

Since 2005, Interline partnered with Busabout to jointly provide the services of Sydney Bus Region 2.

On 1 June 2014, having been independently successful in the next round of tenders, Interline commenced operating all services in the Sydney Bus Region 2..

On 8 October 2023, Region 2 has been passed on to Transit Systems with Interline to cease trading. Besides interline connect

== Routes ==
On 1 June 2014, Interline took over all Region 2 routes from Region 2 partner Busabout. As of 8 October 2023, Transit Systems took over all of the routes.

== Fleet ==
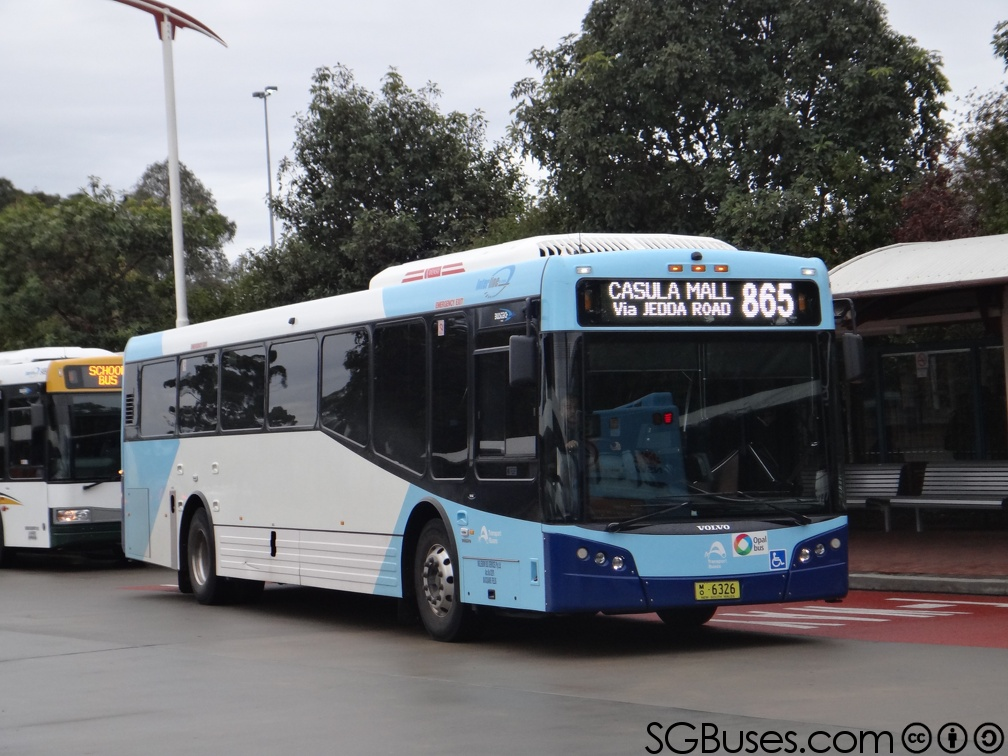
Bustech bodied Volvo B7RLE in June 2015

In the 1980s the Ingleburn Bus Service fleet consisted of Bedford YMT3s and Leyland Super Vikings and Tigers, two of which were configured as coaches.

In the early 1990s, ex ACTION Leyland Nationals, Transperth Leyland B21s and Urban Transit Authority Leyland Atlanteans were purchased. These were in turn replaced by ex ACTION Mercedes-Benz O305s and Renault PR100.2s. More recently new Volvos and Daewoos have been purchased.

Following the Oliveri family's purchase of Southern Cross Transit in August 2002, many Interline buses have been transferred for further service.

Ingleburn Bus Service had a light green and red livery that gave way to Metro-link's turquoise. Interline adopted a white and blue scheme.

In February 2021, Interline received their first electric buses, with ten BCI CitiRiders rolled out into service on two routes. Nine Yutong E12s later arrived from April 2021.

As of September 2023, the Interline fleet consisted of 119 buses.
