= Neil Campbell =

Neil or Niall Campbell may refer to:

- Neil Campbell (Scottish noble) (died 1316), warrior of the Wars of Scottish Independence
- Neil Campbell (bishop of Argyll) (died 1613), Scots bishop
- Neil Campbell (bishop of the Isles) (c. 1590–1645), Scots bishop
- Lord Neill Campbell (c. 1630–1692), Scottish nobleman, governor of New Jersey, 1686–1687
- Sir Neil Campbell (British Army officer) (1776–1827), fought in the Napoleonic Wars
- Neil Campbell (minister) (1678–1761), Principal of Glasgow University and Moderator of the General Assembly of the Church of Scotland
- Robert Neil Campbell (1854–1928), a Scottish physician, known as Sir Neil Campbell
- Neil Campbell (politician) (1880–1960), Australian politician, Tasmanian Leader of the Opposition from 1945 to 1950
- Neil Campbell (chemist) (1903–1996), Scottish chemist and amateur athlete
- Neil Campbell (geologist) (1914–1978), Canadian geologist
- Neil Campbell (rower) (1931–2006), Canadian rower and coach
- Neil Campbell (scientist) (1946–2004), American author of biology textbooks
- Neil Campbell (musician) (born 1966), British experimental musician
- Neil Campbell (footballer) (1977–2022), English footballer
- Neil Campbell (producer), comedian, writer, and producer
- Niall Campbell, 10th Duke of Argyll (1872–1949), British Lord Lieutenant of Argyllshire
- Niall Campbell (poet), Scottish poet
