= Campbells =

Campbells may refer to:

- Clan Campbell
- Campbell's or Campbell's

== See also ==
- Campbell (disambiguation)
