= John Campbell (bishop of Argyll) =

Styles of John Campbell
- Reference style: The Right Reverend
- Spoken style: My Lord or Bishop

John Campbell (Scottish Gaelic: Iain Caimbeul) (died 1613) was a Scottish clergyman who served as the Protestant Bishop of Argyll from 1611 to 1613.

== Life ==
Born in Kilmartin, he was the eldest son of Neil Campbell, Bishop of Argyll.

He succeeded his father as bishop of the diocese of Argyll. He was nominated on 1 June 1608 and consecrated sometime between 23 January and 24 February 1611.

He died of facial cancer in January 1613.

== Family ==
He married twice, first to an unnamed woman of the MacDougall of Raray family and then to Margaret, daughter of Gavin Hamilton, Bishop of Galloway.
