= Metro-link Bus Lines =

Charter operator in Sydney, Australia

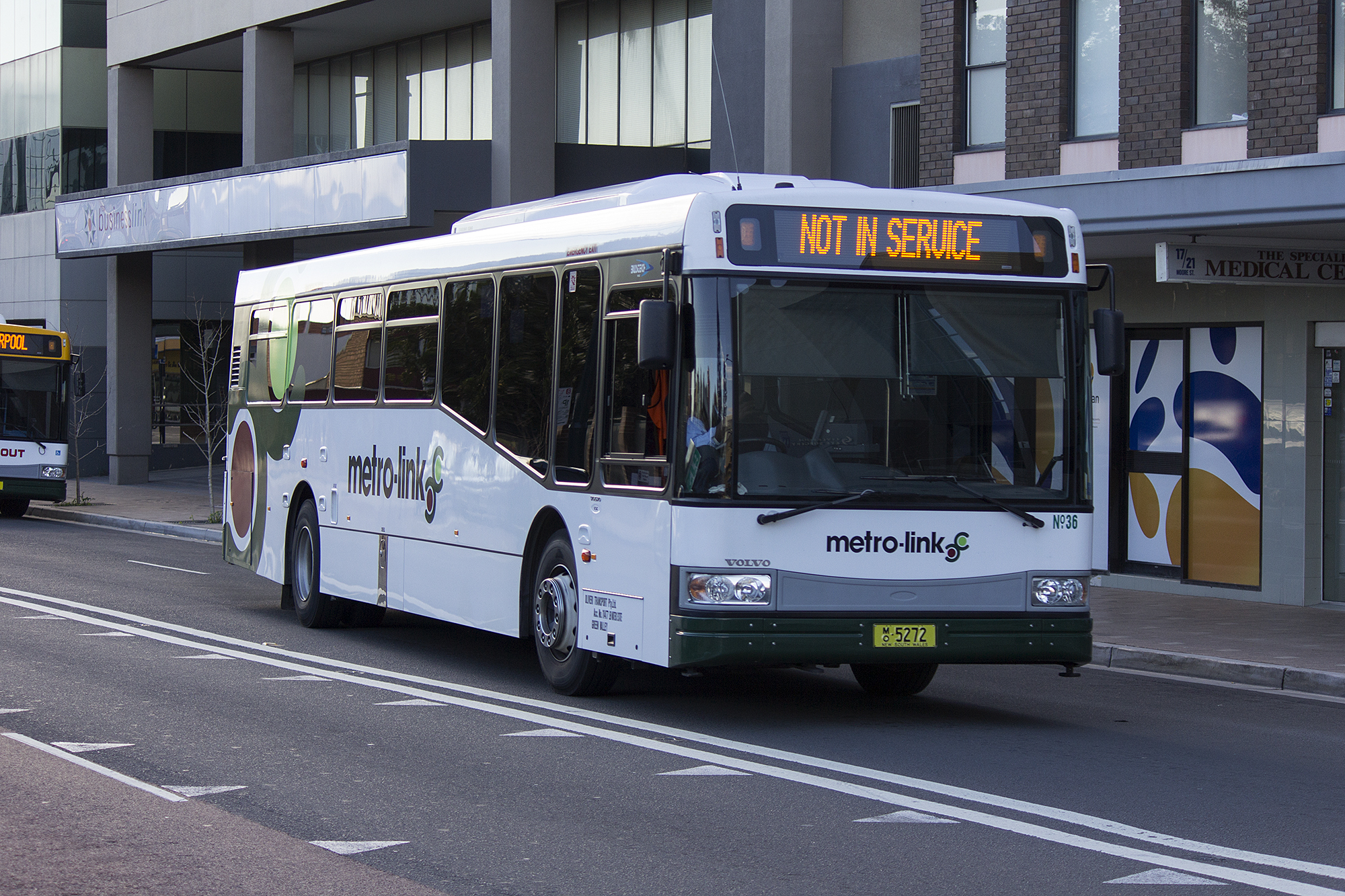
- Bustech bodied Volvo B7RLE at Liverpool in July 2013
- Parent: Oliveri family
- Commenced operation: November 1954
- Headquarters: Green Valley
- Service type: Bus charter operator
- Depots: 1
- Fleet: 15 (May 2014)
- Website: www.metrolink.com.au

Metro-link Bus Lines is an Australian bus charter company operating services in South West Sydney.

== History ==
Metro-link Bus Lines was established in November 1954 when the Oliveri family, trading as Oliveri Transport Service purchased route 41 Liverpool station to Green Valley.

In November 1988, it was merged with Ingleburn Bus Service, which the Oliveri family also owned, and in July 1989 both were renamed Metro-link Bus Lines. In September 1993, the business were again separated.

From 2005, Metro-link's services were part of Sydney Bus Region 3. In October 2013, Transit Systems NSW commenced operating Region 3 including the services formerly operated by Metro-link. Transit Systems leased Metro-link's Green Valley depot, which opened in December 2010. After operating as a charter operator out of another depot in Ingleburn, Metro-link later returned to the Green Valley depot.

From the 1970s until the early 1990s, a coach charter operation was operated under the Relaxaway Tours banner.

== Fleet ==
As at May 2014, the fleet consisted of 15 buses. A long time Leyland purchaser, the fleet today consists of Leyland Tigers and Volvo buses. In the mid-1980s three Volvo B10M coaches were purchased for the Relaxaway Tours division.

For many years the fleet livery was turquoise and red. From 1994 it was changed to the current white, two greens and red scheme. The Relaxaway Tours coaches were painted in a yellow and white livery.
