= James Hamilton (bishop of Argyll) =

SCOTTISH CHURCHMAN AND BISHOP

James Hamilton (died 1580) was a Scottish churchman who served as Bishop of Argyll both pre- and post-Reformation and as Sub-Dean of Glasgow.

== Life ==
He was the illegitimate son of James Hamilton, 1st Earl of Arran. His natural brothers were James Hamilton, Duke of Châtellerault and John Hamilton, Archbishop of St Andrews.

His first ecclesiastical posts were as reader of Petty, Highland, then rector of Spott, East Lothian. He was nominated Archbishop of Glasgow by the crown's representative on 31 July 1547, but was rejected by the papacy in the summer of 1548 on the grounds of illegitimacy. Five years later, he receives a dispensation for his illegitimacy and appointed Bishop of Argyll on 14 July 1553, although it is not certain whether he was ever consecrated to the Episcopate. He also held, in commendam, the Sub-Deanery of Glasgow.

He became a protestant and sat as Bishop of Argyll in the Scottish Reformation Parliament which ratified the Confession of Faith in August 1560.

He died at Monkland on 6 January 1580 n.s. (1579 o.s.).

== Family ==
He married Janet Murray (died before 1 October 1572) and they had three sons, William (burgess first in Canongate then in Glasgow), Gavin, and Paul Hamilton of Coats (entitled "Captain of Arran").

Religious titles
Preceded by William Cunningham	Bishop of Argyll; 1553–1580	Succeeded by Niall Caimbeul
