= Sydney metropolitan bus service contracts =

Australian state transport contracts

Contracts are issued by the Government of New South Wales to metropolitan bus operators in Sydney, Australia, to operate its public bus route network. Since 2005, the government has moved from individual contracts with operators to larger contract regions, leading to the consolidation of bus operators.

== History ==
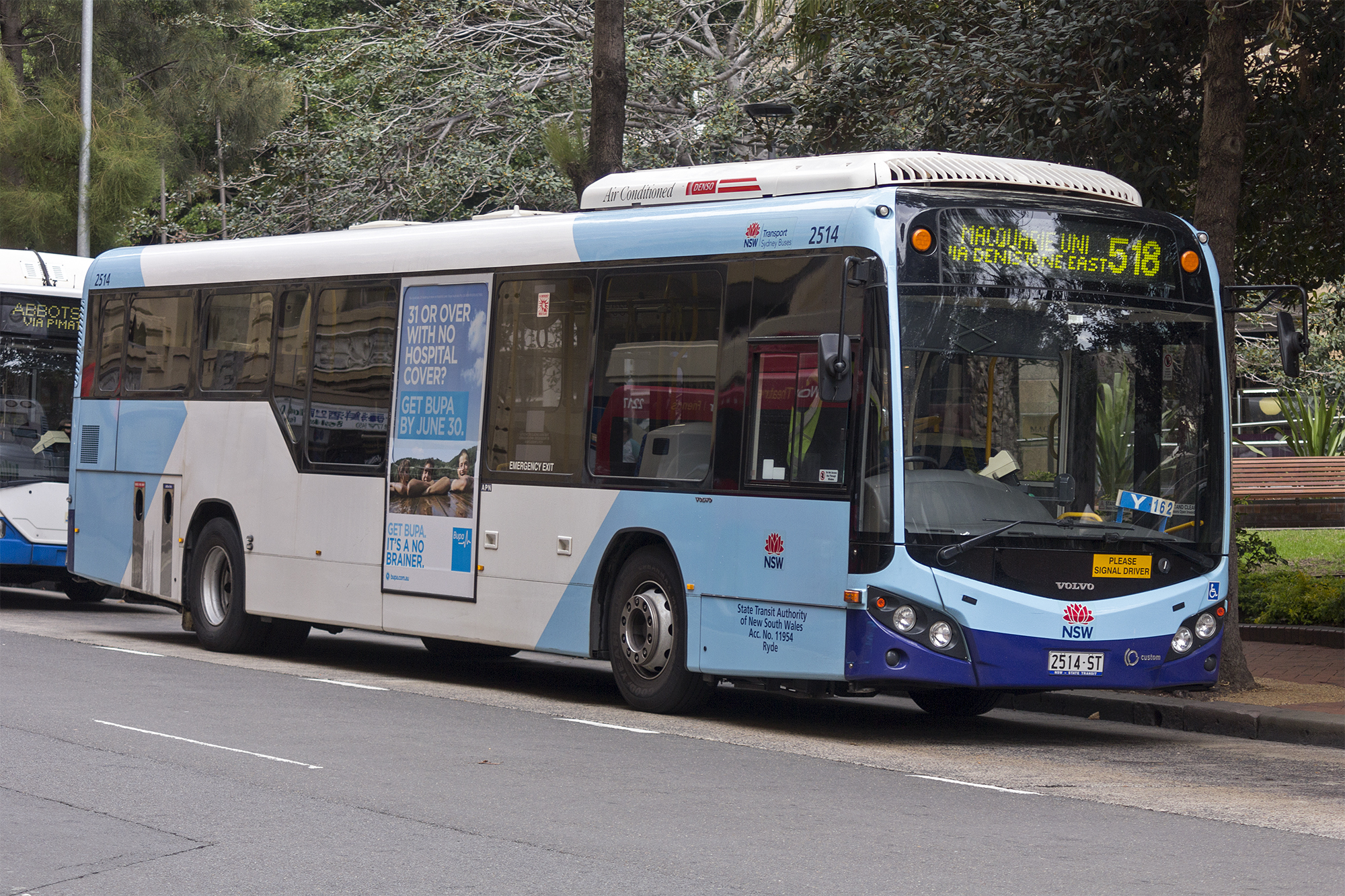
State Transit Custom Coaches bodied Volvo B7RLE at Circular Quay in June 2014 in Transport for NSW livery

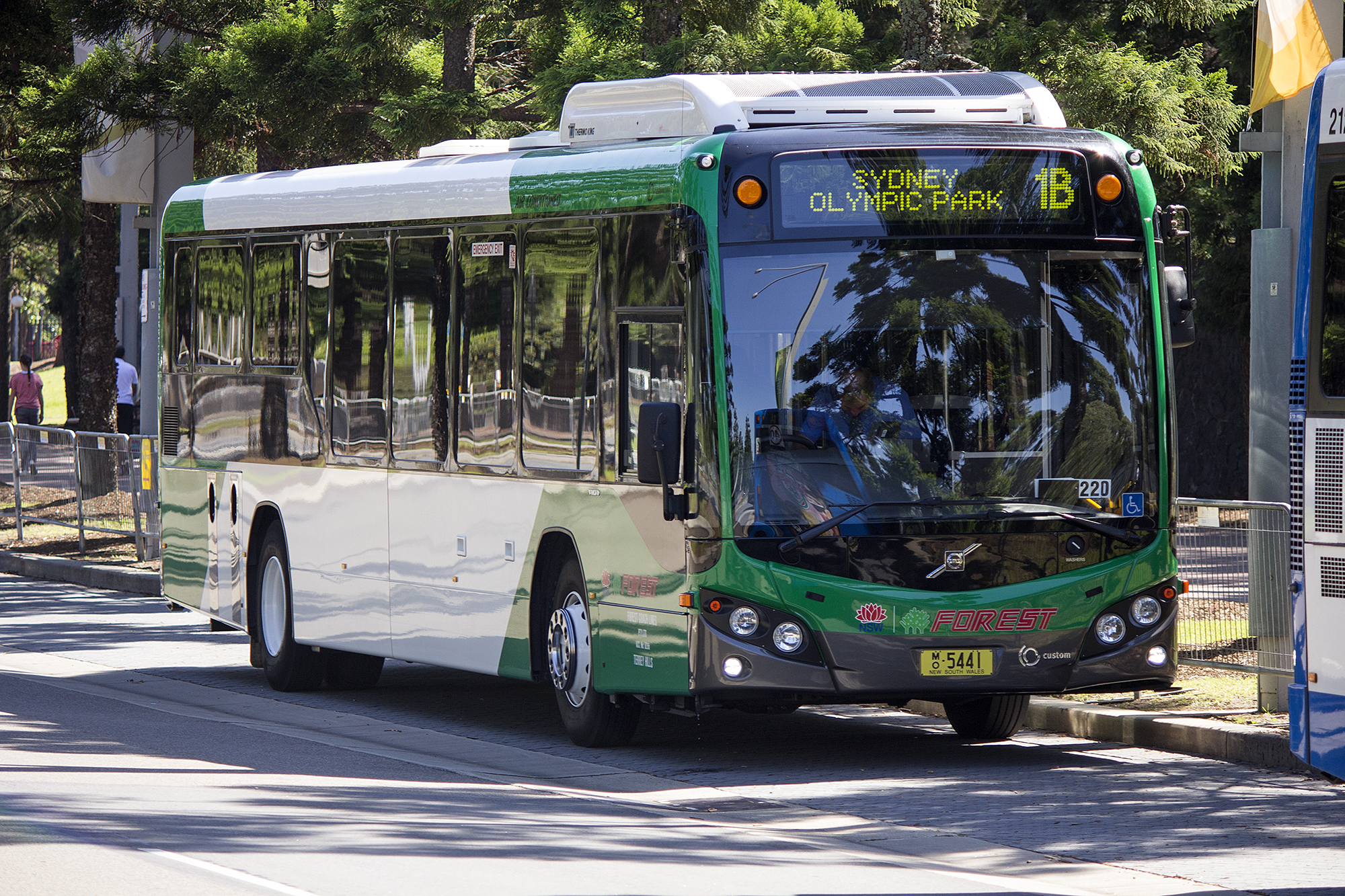
Forest Coach Lines Custom Coaches bodied Volvo B7RLE at Sydney Olympic Park in March 2013 in its green version of Transport for NSW's livery

In February 2004, the Unsworth Review of Bus Services conducted by former transport minister and former premier Barrie Unsworth, reported its findings to the Carr government, recommending that the number of contract areas that existed in Sydney be reduced from 87 to 15 with a lead entity identified for each region to negotiate a contract. This was adopted with the first seven-year performance based contract signed in January 2005. By June 2005, eight had been signed. In some cases the existing operators formed joint venture companies to have a single contract with the government while in other regions there were some takeovers.

The contracts resulted in some consolidation of operators. Harris Park Transport and Moores Tours decided to cease operating at short notice in December 2004. Some of Baxter's Bus Lines routes passed to Connex and Transit First in January 2005. Further consolidation took place after the contracts commenced with Baxter's selling its remaining routes to Westbus in September 2006, Transit First selling out to Connex in February 2007. Veolia (formerly Connex), who operated in regions 10 and 13, took over region 11 operators Crowthers in January 2009 and Caringbah Bus Service in October 2011. The two takeovers resulted in the merger of regions 10 and 11 to form an expanded region 10, reducing the total number of regions to fourteen.

With the contracts coming up for renewal and following a change in government, the O'Farrell Government decided to put the provision of the services out to competitive tender. Transdev NSW was able to negotiate a direct award for regions 10 and 13 after agreeing to provide access to its bus and depot assets at the end of the contracts. The regions operated by State Transit were not included at this stage, however region 6 was tendered out from July 2018.

Under the 2005 contracts, all new buses were purchased by the government and leased to the operators. As a result, when regions have changed hands, all of the post 2005 built buses have remained with the region, with the older buses retained by the outgoing operators.

=== 2020–2023 tenders ===
With the exception of region 6, the government announced in October 2019 that the contracts for the other thirteen regions will be put out to competitive tender by 2022. These contracts were originally due to expire in 2021 and 2022.

The first three regions to be put out to tender were the three remaining State Transit regions 7 to 9. Tenders for Region 8 opened in June 2020 and closed on 30 September 2020, with Keolis Downer announced as the successful tenderer in May 2021. Tenders for Region 7 opened in August 2020 and closed on 18 December 2020, with Busways announced as the successful tenderer in July 2021. Tenders for Region 9 opened in November 2020, with a joint venture of Transdev and John Holland announced as the successful tenderer in November 2021. The three regions were transitioned to the new operators on these following dates:

- Region 7 (North West) in January 2022
- Region 8 (Northern Beaches) in October 2021
- Region 9 (East) in April 2022

Between December 2021 and August 2022, the remaining ten regions were put out to tender in three tranches:

- Tranche 1: Regions 4, 12 and 14. Contracts for Regions 12 and 14 can be consolidated in a single bid. Tenders opened in January 2022 and closed on 14 April 2022. In November 2022, CDC NSW, the incumbent operator for Regions 4 and 14, was awarded the contracts for the three regions, with region 12 to be consolidated into Region 14.
- Tranche 2: Regions 3, 5, 10 and 13. Any combination of the four contracts can be consolidated in a single bid. Tenders opened between March and May 2022. In December 2022, Transit Systems NSW, the incumbent operator for Region 3, was awarded the contracts for Regions 3 and 13, with region 13 to be consolidated into Region 3. The contracts for Regions 5 and 10, with region 5 consolidated into region 10, were awarded to U-Go Mobility, a new joint venture between UGL and Go-Ahead Group.
- Tranche 3: Regions 1, 2 and 15. Tenders opened between June and August 2022. In February 2023, Busways, the incumbent operator for Region 1, was awarded the contract for the region, while Transit Systems was awarded the contracts for Regions 2 and 15, with Region 15 to be consolidated into Region 2.

The new contracts of the ten regions commenced between April and December 2023.

== Livery ==
A requirement of the contracts is that operators adopt a white and two blues livery as prescribed by Transport for NSW, this was implemented from 2010. Forest Coach Lines' 2005 contract did not require their buses to be repainted blue, hence the livery applied to their buses saw the blue replaced with green. This loophole was closed when the region was tendered in 2012.

== Current contracts ==
Since October 2023, there are 10 contract regions in Sydney, each of which is tied to a geographical area. Current contracts commenced prior to 2018 operate for five years, with an option to extend for a further three years. Contracts commenced and awarded since 2018 are for an eight-year period. All of these contracts were awarded via open tender.

Region	Service area	Current operators	Start date of current contract	End date of current contract (if known)
1	Blacktown LGA, Penrith LGA	Busways	10 December 2023	28 June 2031
2	Campbelltown LGA, Liverpool LGA, Camden LGA	Transit Systems	8 October 2023	28 June 2031
3	Liverpool LGA, Fairfield LGA, Cumberland LGA, Canterbury-Bankstown LGA	Transit Systems	6 August 2023	30 November 2030
4	Hills District	CDC NSW	April 2023	28 June 2031
6	Inner West	Transit Systems	1 July 2018	30 June 2026
7	Northern Suburbs	Busways	9 January 2022	9 January 2030
8	Northern Beaches	Keolis Downer Northern Beaches	31 October 2021	31 October 2029
9	Eastern Suburbs	Transdev John Holland	3 April 2022	2 April 2030
10	Sutherland Shire, Georges River LGA, Canterbury-Bankstown LGA	U-Go Mobility; Maianbar Bundeena Bus Service (route 989)	1 July 2023	30 November 2028
14	Ku-ring-gai LGA, Northern Beaches	CDC NSW	21 May 2023	29 June 2030

== Region details ==
=== Region 1 ===
Region 1 covers the outer western suburbs between Blacktown, Penrith, Windsor and Richmond. It also operated route 740 services via the M2 Hills Motorway to Macquarie Centre, which ceased in May 2019.

When the region was established in 2005, services were operated by the Area 1 Management Company consortium of incumbent operators Busways, Hawkesbury Valley Buses and Westbus. Following a competitive tendering process, on 6 October 2013 Busways took over all services in the region in its own right. In February 2023, following another competitive tendering process, Busways successfully retained and was awarded a seven-year contract for Region 1. The contract will commence in December 2023.

Region 1 routes
Route	Description
545	Macquarie Park to Parramatta via Eastwood and Telopea
668	Richmond to Windsor via Glossodia and Wilberforce
669	Wilberforce to Sackville via Ebenezer
671	Riverstone to Windsor via McGraths Hill and Vineyard
672	Windsor to Wisemans Ferry (Loop Service)
673	Penrith to Windsor via Cranebrook
674	Mount Druitt to Windsor via Shanes Park and Bligh Park
675A	Windsor to Richmond via RAAF Base and Bligh Park (Loop Service)
675C	Windsor to Richmond via Bligh Park and RAAF Base (Loop Service)
676	Windsor to South Windsor (Loop Service)
677	Penrith to Richmond via Londonderry
678	Penrith to Richmond via Cranebrook
679	Windsor to Maraylya via McGraths Hill
680	Richmond to Bowen Mountain via Grose Vale and Grose Wold (Loop Service)
682	Richmond to Kurrajong via Berambing (Loop Service)
718	Seven Hills to Kings Langley
721	Blacktown to Blacktown Hospital (Loop Service)
722	Blacktown to Prospect via Flushcombe Rd (Loop Service)
723	Blacktown to Mount Druitt via Eastern Creek
724	Blacktown to Arndell Park via Huntingwood (Loop Service)
726	Blacktown to Doonside via Monash Rd (Loop Service)
728	Blacktown to Mount Druitt
729	Blacktown to Mount Druitt via Minchinbury
730	Blacktown to Castle Hill via Glenwood and Norwest
731	Blacktown to Rouse Hill Station via Stanhope Gardens
732	Blacktown to Rouse Hill Station via The Ponds
734	Blacktown to Riverstone via Schofields
735	Rouse Hill to Blacktown (Loop Service)
738	Mount Druitt to Eastern Creek via Rooty Hill (Loop Service)
739V	Mount Druitt to Mount Druitt South (Loop Service)
740	Rouse Hill to Gables
741	Riverstone to Oakville via Box Hill and Maraylya
742	Rouse Hill Station to Marsden Park
743	Blacktown to Kings Langley
744	Blacktown to Blacktown Industrial Area
745	St Marys to Norwest Private Hospital via Stanhope Gardens
746	Rouse Hill to Riverstone
747	Rouse Hill Station to Mount Druitt via Riverstone and Marsden Park
748	Tallawong Station to Melonba via Schofields
750	Blacktown to Mount Druitt via Bidwill
751	Blacktown to Melonba via Colebee
752	Blacktown to Rouse Hill Station via Quakers Hill
753	Blacktown to Doonside (Loop Service)
754	Mount Druitt to Blacktown via Hassall Grove (Loop Service)
755	Mount Druitt to Shalvey and Plumpton Marketplace
756	Blacktown to Mount Druitt via Woodcroft and Plumpton
758	St Marys to Mount Druitt via Tregear and Shalvey
759	St Marys to Mount Druitt via Ropes Crossing
761	Mount Druitt to Bidwill (Loop Service)
770	Penrith to Mount Druitt via St Marys
771	Mount Druitt to St Marys via Colyton
772	WSI Airport to Mount Druitt via St Clair
774	Penrith to Mount Druitt via Nepean Hospital
775	Penrith to Mount Druitt via Erskine Park
776	Penrith to Mount Druitt via St Clair
779	Kemps Creek to St Marys via Erskine Park
780	Mount Druitt to Penrith via Ropes Crossing
781	Penrith to St Marys via Glenmore Park
782	Penrith to St Marys via Werrington
783	Penrith to Werrington via Jordan Springs
784	Penrith to Cranebrook (Loop Service)
785	Werrington to Penrith via Cambridge Park
786	Penrith to Cranebrook via North Penrith (Loop Service)
789	Penrith to Luddenham
790	WSI Airport to Penrith via Kingswood
791	Penrith to Jamisontown via South Penrith (Loop Service)
793	Penrith to South Penrith (Loop Service)
794	Penrith to Glenmore Park via The Northern Rd
795	Warragamba to Penrith
797	Penrith to Glenmore Park (Loop Service)
799	Penrith to Glenmore Park via Regentville
S11	St Marys to St Clair (Loop Service)
S13	Penrith to Mountainview Retreat Retirement Village (Loop Service)
S7	Blacktown to Myrtle Glen Stanhope Gardens

=== Region 2 ===
Region 2 initially covered the south western suburbs between Liverpool, Ingleburn and Hoxton Park. Other principal suburbs are Bringelly and Glenfield.

When the region was established in 2005, services were operated by the Area 2 Management Company consortium of incumbent operators Busabout and Interline. Following a competitive tendering process, on 1 June 2014 Interline took over all services in the region in its own right.

Nine years later, in February 2023, following another competitive tendering process, Transit Systems was awarded a new contract for the region. The region also consolidated region 15 and expanded to cover Camden, Narellan and Macarthur, as well as services to Wollongong. The new contract commenced on 8 October 2023, with Transit Systems taking over Region 2 services from Interline and Region 15 services from Busabout.

Region 2 routes
Route	Description
31	Camden to Cut Hill Rd, Cobbitty via Coates Park Rd
32	Camden to Warragamba via Theresa Park and Werombi
38	Camden to Spring Creek and Brownlow Hill (Loop Service)
39	Camden to The Oaks via Mowbray Park and Belimbla Park
40	Camden to Belimbla Park and Oakdale via The Oaks (Loop Service)
49	Camden to Menangle and Razorback (Loop Service)
825	WSI Airport to Liverpool via Bonnyrigg
840	Campbelltown Hospital to Oran Park
841	Leppington to Narellan via Gregory Hills
845	WSI Airport to Campbelltown via Oran Park
849	Macarthur to Macarthur Heights (Loop Service)
850	Minto to Narellan
851	Liverpool to Carnes Hill via Cowpasture Rd
852	Liverpool to Carnes Hill via Greenway Dr and Cowpasture Rd
853	Liverpool to Carnes Hill via Hoxton Park Rd
854	Liverpool to Carnes Hill via Greenway Dr and Hoxton Park Rd
855	Liverpool to Rutleigh Park via Austral and Leppington Station
856	Liverpool to Bringelly
857	Liverpool to Narellan
858	Leppington to Oran Park
859	Edmondson Park Station to Carnes Hill
860	WSI Airport to Liverpool via Leppington
861	Carnes Hill to Denham Court via Austral
864	Glenfield to Carnes Hill via Horningsea Park
865	Liverpool to Casula Mall via Lurnea Shops
866	Liverpool to Casula Mall
867	Glenfield to Prestons
868	Ingleburn to Edmondson Park Station
869	Liverpool to Ingleburn via Prestons and Edmondson Park
870	Liverpool to Campbelltown via Glenfield
871	Liverpool to Campbelltown
872	Liverpool to Campbelltown via Macquarie Fields
873	Ingleburn to Minto
874	Minto to Raby (Loop Service)
875	Minto to St Andrews (Loop Service)
876	Macquarie Fields Station to Eucalyptus Dr (Loop Service)
877	Campbelltown to Kearns via Eagle Vale and Eschol Park (Loop Service)
878	Campbelltown to Kearns via Eschol Park (Loop Service)
879	Campelltown to Leumeah Station via Blair Athol
880	Campbelltown to Minto via Eagle Vale and Kearns
881	Campbelltown to Leumeah North (Loop Service)
882	Campbelltown to Leumeah South (Loop Service)
883	Campbelltown to Ruse (Loop Service)
883K	Campbelltown to Kentlyn via Ruse
884	Campbelltown to Airds (Loop Service)
884W	Campbelltown to Wedderburn via Airds
885	Campbelltown to Bradbury and St Helens Park North (Loop Service)
885A	Campbelltown to Bradbury via Airds (Loop Service)
886	Campbelltown to Glen Alpine (Loop Service)
887	Campbelltown to Wollongong via Appin
888	Campbelltown to St Helens Park via Ambarvale and Rosemeadow (Loop Service)
889	Campbelltown to Menangle via Menangle Park
890	Campbelltown to Harrington Park via Narellan Vale and Narellan (Loop Service)
890C	Campbelltown to Camden via Narellan
891	Campbelltown to Mount Annan via Currans Hill
892	Campbelltown to Mount Annan via Narellan Vale (Loop Service)
893	Campbelltown to Narellan via Spring Farm and Elderslie
894	Campbelltown to Bridgewater via Narellan and Camden
894X	Campbelltown to Bridgewater via Camden bypass
895	Campbelltown to Camden South via Camden (Loop Service)
896	Campbelltown to Oran Park (Loop Service)
897	Campbelltown to Smeaton Grange
898	Campbelltown to Harrington Park via Narellan Rd
899	Camden to Catherine Field
S17	Camden to Narellan via Spring Farm

=== Region 3 ===
Region 3 initially covered the south western suburbs between Parramatta, Liverpool and Bonnyrigg. Other principal suburbs are Cabramatta, Fairfield and Wetherill Park.

When the region was established in 2005, services were operated by the Area 3 Management Company consortium of incumbent operators Baxter's Bus Lines, Busabout, Hopkinsons, Metro-link and Westbus which operated all routes except Liverpool–Parramatta T-way route T80 which was operated by Western Sydney Buses. Baxter's sold its routes to Westbus in September 2006.

Following a competitive tendering process, on 13 October 2013, Transit Systems took over the operation of the region. Nine years later, in December 2022, following another competitive tender process, Transit Systems retained and was awarded a seven-year contract for the region. The region also consolidated region 13 and expanded to cover Lidcombe, Granville, Bankstown and Burwood. The new contract commenced on 6 August 2023, with Transit Systems taking over Region 13 services from Transdev NSW.

Region 3 routes
Route	Description
525	Lidcombe to Parramatta
80	Parramatta to Liverpool
800	Fairfield to Blacktown via Pemulwuy
801	Liverpool to Badgerys Creek
802	Parramatta to Liverpool via Guildford West
803	Liverpool to Miller (Loop Service)
804	Parramatta to Liverpool via Fairfield West
805	Cabramatta to Liverpool via Bonnyrigg
806	Parramatta to Liverpool via Abbotsbury
807	Cabramatta to Cecil Hills via Bonnyrigg
808	Fairfield to Liverpool via Abbotsbury
809	Merrylands to Pemulwuy via South Wentworthville
810	Parramatta to Merrylands via Pemulwuy
811	Parramatta to Pemulwuy via Beresford Rd
812	Fairfield to Blacktown via Prospect Hwy
813	Fairfield to Western Sydney Parklands and Bonnyrigg
814	Fairfield to Smithfield and Wetherill Park Industrial Area (Loop Service)
815	Cabramatta to Mount Pritchard (Loop Service)
816	Cabramatta to Greenfield Park (Loop Service)
817	Fairfield to Cabramatta via Edensor Park
818	Merrylands to Westmead Hospitals
819	Liverpool to Prairiewood via Orange Grove Rd (Loop Service)
820	Merrylands to Guildford via Woodpark
821	Guildford to Woodpark or Smithfield Industrial Area
822	Merrylands to Guildford (Loop Service)
823	Liverpool to Warwick Farm (Loop Service)
824	Parramatta to Westmead Hospitals via South Wentworthville
827	Liverpool to Carnes Hill
835	Prairiewood to St Marys
901	Liverpool to Holsworthy via Wattle Grove
902	Liverpool to Holsworthy via Moorebank
903	Liverpool to Chipping Norton (Loop Service)
904	Liverpool to Fairfield
905	Fairfield to Bankstown
906	Fairfield to Parramatta
907	Parramatta to Bankstown via Bass Hill
908	Bankstown to Merrylands via Auburn and Birrong
909	Parramatta to Bankstown via Auburn and Birrong
910	Bankstown to Parramatta via Chester Hill
911	Bankstown to Auburn via Georges Hall
912	Holsworthy to Sandy Point via Voyager Point
913	Bankstown to Strathfield
914	Strathfield to Greenacre
916	Guildford to Chester Hill
920	Bankstown to Parramatta
925	Lidcombe to East Hills via Bankstown
928	Revesby to Milperra
M90	Burwood to Liverpool
N30	City Town Hall to Macarthur (Night Service)
N40	City Town Hall to East Hills (Night Service)
S1	Cabramatta to Lansvale (Loop Service)
S10	Heckenberg to Miller Shops
S2	Granville to Sefton
S3	Auburn to Chrisholm Road
S4	Fairfield to Chester Hill via Villawood and Carramar

=== Region 4 ===
Region 4 covers The Hills district including Parramatta, Pennant Hills, Castle Hill and Rouse Hill. Other principal suburbs are Dural, Blacktown and Baulkham Hills. It also operates services via the M2 Hills Motorway to Macquarie Centre, Chatswood, Milsons Point and the Sydney CBD.

When the region was established in 2005, services were operated by incumbent operator Hillsbus. Hillsbus successfully bid to retain the region with a new contract commencing on 1 August 2014.

Following the short notice cessation of operations by Harris Park Transport, its routes in the Hills District were taken over by Hillsbus on 20 December 2004, then transferred to Sydney Buses as part of region 7 on 28 January 2005, with six routes returning to Region 4 on 25 September 2005.

Following a tendering process, CDC NSW (parent company of Hillsbus) retained and was awarded an eight-year contract for Region 4 in November 2022. The new contract commenced in April 2023. The Hillsbus brand was phased out in favour of the CDC NSW brand.

Region 4 routes
Route	Description
549	Epping to Parramatta
553	Beecroft to West Pennant Hills (Loop Service)
590	Pennant Hills to Hornsby via Normanhurst
600	Parramatta to Pennant Hills via Castle Hill
601	Parramatta to Rouse Hill Station via Hills Showground
603	Parramatta to Rouse Hill Station via Glenhaven
604	Parramatta to Dural via Castle Hill
605	Rouse Hill Station to North Kellyville
606	Parramatta to Winston Hills
607X	City QVB to Bella Vista Station (Express Service)
608	Rouse Hill to Windsor
609	Parramatta to North Parramatta (Loop Service)
610X	City QVB to Castle Hill (Express Service)
611	Macquarie Park to Blacktown via M2 Mwy
612X	North Sydney to Baulkham Hills (Express Service)
613X	City QVB to Bella Vista (Express Service)
614X	City Clarence St to Baulkham Hills (Express Service)
615X	City QVB to Kellyville and North Kellyville (Express Service)
616X	City QVB to Kellyville Ridge (Express Service)
617	Kellyville Station to Rouse Hill via Beaumont Hills
620X	City Kent St to Cherrybrook (Express Service)
622	Milsons Point to Cherrybrook
625	Parramatta to Pennant Hills
626	Pennant Hills to Kellyville via Cherrybrook
630	Epping to Blacktown via Baulkham Hills
632	Pennant Hills to Rouse Hill Station via Norwest and Castle Hill
633	Pennant Hills to Rouse Hill via Kellyville and Castle Hill
634	Castle Hill to Castlewood (Loop Service)
635	Beecroft to Castle Hill via West Pennant Hills
637	Castle Hill to Glenorie via Round Corner and Galston
638	Castle Hill or Pennant Hills to Berrilee and Berowra Waters
639	Castle Hill to Kenthurst and Maraylya
640	Kenthurst Pitt Town Rd to Kenthurst Cadwells Rd
641	Dural to Rouse Hill
642X	City Wynyard to Dural (Express Service)
643	Rouse Hill to Gables via Box Hill
651	Epping to Rouse Hill Station via Castle Hill
652X	City Wynyard to West Pennant Hills (Express Service)
660	Parramatta to Castle Hill via Crestwood
661	Parramatta to Blacktown via North West Twy and Kings Langley
662	Parramatta to Castle Hill via North West Twy and Bella Vista
663	Parramatta to Rouse Hill Station via Glenwood
664	Parramatta to Rouse Hill Station via Norwest
665	Parramatta to Rouse Hill Station
700	Parramatta to Blacktown
702	Seven Hills to Blacktown
705	Parramatta to Blacktown via Pendle Hill
706	Parramatta to Blacktown via Kings Langley and Winston Hills
708	Parramatta to Constitution Hill Retirement Community via Pendle Hill
709	Wentworthville Shopping Plaza to Constitution Hill Retirement Community
711	Parramatta to Blacktown via Constitution Hill
714	Seven Hills to Norwest Station via Crestwood
715	Seven Hills to Rouse Hill Station via Norwest and Kellyville
N31	Liverpool to Leppington (Night Service)
N50	City Town Hall to Liverpool via Strathfield (Night Service)
N60	City Town Hall to Fairfield via Strathfield (Night Service)
N61	City Town Hall to Carlingford via Strathfield (Night Service)
N70	City Town Hall to Penrith via Parramatta (Night Service)
N71	City Town Hall to Richmond via Parramatta (Night Service)
N92	City Town Hall to Tallawong via Macquarie Park (Night Service)

=== Region 6 ===
Region 6 covers the Inner West and southern suburbs with services extending to the Sydney CBD, Chatswood, Westfield Eastgardens, Bondi Junction, Hurstville and Miranda. Principal suburbs are Ashfield, Burwood, Campsie, Leichhardt, Rockdale and Sydney Olympic Park. The region operates out of Burwood, Kingsgrove, Leichhardt and Tempe depots.

When the region was established in 2005, the region was operated by incumbent operator State Transit. The contract was renewed 1 July 2013 for five years without a competitive tendering process.

In May 2017, the government announced the operation of region 6 would be contracted out to the private sector. The contract was awarded to Transit Systems with operations commencing on 1 July 2018.

Region 6 routes
Route	Description
303	Prince of Wales Hospital to Sans Souci
305	Redfern to Mascot Stamford Hotel
308	Marrickville Metro to Central Eddy Ave via Redfern (Loop Service)
320	Central Railway Square to Green Square (Loop Service)
348	Prince of Wales Hospital to Wolli Creek
358	Sydenham to Randwick (Loop Service)
389	Pyrmont to Bondi Junction
401	Lidcombe Station to Lidcombe Birnie Ave (Loop Service)
406	Hurlstone Park to Five Dock
407	Strathfield to Burwood
408	Burwood to Rookwood Cemetery via Flemington
410	Hurstville to Macquarie Park
412	City Martin Place to Campsie via Earlwood and Dulwich Hill
413	Central Pitt St to Campsie
415	Campsie to Chiswick
418	Burwood to Sydenham and Tempe
420	Burwood to Mascot Station
422	Central Pitt St to Kogarah
423	City Martin Place to Kingsgrove
423X	City Martin Place to Kingsgrove
426	City Martin Place to Dulwich Hill
428	City Martin Place to Canterbury
428X	City Martin Place to Canterbury
430	Sydenham to Central Railway Square (Loop Service)
431	City Martin Place to Glebe Point
433	Central Pitt St to Balmain Gladstone Park
437	City QVB to Five Dock via City West Link
438N	City Martin Place to Abbotsford
438X	City Martin Place to Abbotsford
440	Rozelle to Bondi Junction
441	Birchgrove to City Art Gallery via QVB (Loop Service)
442	Balmain East Wharf to City QVB (Loop Service)
445	Balmain to Campsie via MarketPlace Leichhardt
458	Burwood to Ryde
461N	City Hyde Park to Burwood
461X	City Domain to Burwood
464	Ashfield to Mortlake
466	Burwood to Cabarita
469	MarketPlace Leichhardt to Glebe (Loop Service)
470	City Martin Place to Lilyfield
473	Campsie to Rockdale
476	Rockdale to Dolls Point (Loop Service)
477	Rockdale to Miranda
478	Rockdale to Miranda via Ramsgate
479	Rockdale to Kyeemagh (Loop Service)
480	Central Pitt St to Strathfield via Homebush Rd
483	Central Pitt St to Strathfield via South Strathfield
487	Canterbury to Bankstown Central
490	Drummoyne to Hurstville
491	Five Dock to Hurstville
492	Drummoyne to Rockdale
493	Rockdale to Roselands
502	City Town Hall and Drummoyne to Cabarita Wharf
504	City Domain to Chiswick
526	Strathfield to Rhodes Shopping Centre
530	Chatswood to Burwood

=== Region 7 ===
Region 7 covers the north western suburbs with services extending to the Sydney CBD. Principal suburbs are Chatswood, Epping, Macquarie Park, North Sydney, Ryde and Parramatta. The region operates out of Ryde depot and Willoughby depot.

When the region was established in 2005, the region was operated by incumbent operator State Transit. State Transit permanently took control of a few former Harris Park Transport services in September 2005, and the region expanded to cover the whole of Carlingford, Epping and include North Rocks, West Pennant Hills and Beecroft for the first time.

The contract was renewed on 1 July 2013, and again on 1 July 2017 for five years without a competitive tendering process. The contract was put out to competitive tender in 2020 and was awarded to Busways, with operations commencing on 9 January 2022.

Region 7 routes
Route	Description
113	Royal North Shore Hospital to Chatswood
115	Chatswood to North Sydney Station (Loop Service)
119	North Sydney to Gore Hill
120	Chatswood to City QVB (Loop Service)
202	City Bridge St to Northbridge via North Sydney
203	Milsons Point to Castlecrag via North Sydney
204	City Bridge St to Northbridge via Freeway
205	City Bridge St to East Willoughby via Freeway
206	City Bridge St to East Lindfield via Freeway
207	City Bridge St to East Lindfield via North Sydney
208	City Bridge St to East Lindfield via North Sydney and Northbridge
209	Milsons Point to East Lindfield via North Sydney
251	City Wynyard to Lane Cove West via Freeway
252	North Sydney to Gladesville
253	City Wynyard to Riverview via Freeway
254	McMahons Point to Riverview via North Sydney
255	Chatswood to Colwell Cres and Beaconsfield Rd
256	Chatswood to Chatswood West (Loop Service)
258	Chatswood to Lane Cove West
261	North Sydney to Lane Cove via Longueville
265	North Sydney to Lane Cove via Crows Nest
267	Greenwich to Chatswood via Crows Nest
269	North Sydney to Milsons Point via Kirribilli (Loop Service)
275	Castlecrag to Chatswood
285	City Wynyard to Lane Cove West via Freeway
286	Milsons Point to Denistone East via North Sydney and St Leonards
287	Milsons Point to Ryde via North Sydney and St Leonards
288	City Erskine St to Macquarie University via Freeway
290	City Erskine St to Epping via North Sydney (Night Service)
291	McMahons Point to Epping via North Sydney
292	City Erskine St to Marsfield via Freeway, Lane Cove North and Macquarie Park
293	City Wynyard to Marsfield via Lane Cove Tunnel
295	Epping to North Epping (Loop Service)
297	City Wynyard to Denistone East via Lane Cove Tunnel
501	Central Pitt St to West Ryde
505	City Town Hall to Woolwich
506	City Domain to Macquarie University via East Ryde
507	City Hyde Park and Gladesville to Meadowbank via Putney
513	West Ryde to Carlingford via Dundas Valley
515	Ryde to Eastwood
516	Chatswood to Top Ryde City via North Ryde
517	Ryde to Macquarie Park via Bridge Rd
518	Meadowbank Wharf to Macquarie University via Ryde
52	City Hyde Park to Parramatta via West Ryde
521	Eastwood to Parramatta via Park Rd
523	West Ryde to Parramatta via Bartlett St
524	West Ryde to Parramatta
533	Chatswood to Sydney Olympic Park via North Ryde and Rhodes
536	Chatswood to Gladesville via Hunters Hill
538	Woolwich to Gladesville
540	Newington to Auburn
541	Eastwood to Epping
544	Macquarie Centre to Auburn via Eastwood
546	Epping to Parramatta via North Rocks and Oatlands
550	Macquarie Park to Parramatta via Epping
551	Marsfield to Eastwood via Vimiera Rd
N80	City Town Hall to Hornsby via Strathfield (Night Service)
N81	City Town Hall to Parramatta via Sydney Olympic Park (Night Service)
N90	City Town Hall to Hornsby via Chatswood (Night Service)
N91	Macquarie Centre to City Town Hall (Night Service)

=== Region 8 ===
Region 8 covers the lower North Shore and Northern Beaches with services extending to the Sydney CBD. Principal suburbs are Brookvale, Chatswood, Manly, Mosman, North Sydney and Palm Beach. The region operates out of Brookvale, Mona Vale, North Sydney depots.

When the region was established in 2005, the region was operated by incumbent operator State Transit. The contract was renewed on 1 July 2013, and again on 1 July 2017 for five years without a competitive tendering process. The contract was put out to competitive tender in 2020 and was awarded to Keolis Downer Northern Beaches, with operations commencing on 31 October 2021.

Region 8 routes
Route	Description
100	Taronga Zoo to City QVB
111	South Mosman Wharf to Chowder Bay
114	Royal North Shore Hospital to Balmoral
144	Chatswood to Manly via St Leonards
145	Seaforth to Warringah Mall
150X	Milsons Point to Manly (Express Service)
154X	Milsons Point to Dee Why (Express Service)
155	Frenchs Forest to Bayview Garden Village
156	Mona Vale to McCarrs Creek
160X	Chatswood to Dee Why via Frenchs Forest (Express Service)
161	Manly to North Head (Loop Service)
162	Manly to Seaforth
165X	City Wynyard to South Curl Curl (Express Service)
166	Manly to Frenchs Forest via Dee Why Beach
167	Manly to Warringah Mall via South Curl Curl
168X	City Wynyard to Balgowlah via North Balgowlah (Express Service)
170X	City Wynyard to Manly (Express Service)
171X	City Wynyard to Balgowlah via Clontarf (Express Service)
172X	City Wynyard to Warringah Mall via North Balgowlah (Express Service)
173X	City Wynyard to Warringah Mall via Balgowlah Shops (Express Service)
174X	City Wynyard to Narraweena (Express Service)
176X	City Wynyard to Dee Why via North Curl Curl (Express Service)
177	Warringah Mall to Dee Why
177X	City Wynyard to Dee Why via Wingala (Express Service)
178	Warringah Mall to Cromer Heights
179	Warringah Mall to Wheeler Heights
180	Warringah Mall to Collaroy Plateau
180X	City Wynyard to Collaroy Plateau (Express Service)
181X	City Wynyard to Narrabeen (Express Service)
182	Narrabeen to Mona Vale
185	Narrabeen to Mona Vale via Warriewood Valley
190X	City Wynyard to North Avalon (Express Service)
191	Avalon Beach to Taylors Point (Loop Service)
192	Avalon Beach to Stokes Point (Loop Service)
199	Manly to Palm Beach via Dee Why and Mona Vale
201	City Bridge St to Cremorne
225	Neutral Bay Wharf to Cremorne Point Wharf
228	Mosman to Clifton Gardens
229	North Sydney to Beauty Point
230	Milsons Point to Mosman Wharf via North Sydney
238	Balmoral to Taronga Zoo Wharf
243	City Wynyard to Spit Junction via North Cremorne
246	City Wynyard to Balmoral Heights
249	City Wynyard to Beauty Point
263	City Bridge St to Crows Nest via Cremorne
280	Chatswood to Warringah Mall
B1	B-Line City Wynyard to Mona Vale
BN1	B-Line City QVB to Mona Vale (Night Service)

=== Region 9 ===
Region 9 covers the Eastern Suburbs with services extending to the Sydney CBD and Leichhardt. Principal suburbs are Bondi Junction, Botany, Maroubra, Mascot, Randwick and Surry Hills. The region operates out of Port Botany, Randwick and Waverley depots.

When the region was established in 2005, the region was operated by incumbent operator State Transit. The contract was renewed on 1 July 2013, and again on 1 July 2017 for five years without a competitive tendering process. The contract was put out to competitive tender in 2021 and was awarded to Transdev John Holland, with operations commencing on 3 April 2022.

Region 9 routes
Route	Description
1	Moore Park Interchange to Central Chalmers Street
304	City Circular Quay to Green Square (Loop Service)
306	Redfern to Mascot Station (Loop Service)
307	Eastgardens to Mascot Station (Loop Service)
309	Redfern to Port Botany
310	Central Railway Square to Botany
311	City Millers Point to Central Belmore Park via Potts Point and Darlinghurst
313	Bondi Junction to Coogee via Carrington Rd
323	Edgecliff to North Bondi via New South Head Rd
324	City Walsh Bay to Watsons Bay via Old South Head Rd
325	City Walsh Bay to Watsons Bay via Vaucluse Rd
326	Edgecliff to Bondi Junction via Bellevue Hill
327	Edgecliff to Bondi Junction via Manning Rd and Bellevue Rd
328	Bondi Junction to Darling Point via Edgecliff (Loop Service)
333	City Circular Quay to North Bondi via Bondi Junction
339	Clovelly to Central Foveaux St (Loop Service)
339X	City Martin Place to Clovelly (Express Service)
342	Kingsford to Daceyville
343	City Circular Quay to Kingsford
350	Bondi Junction to Sydney Airport Domestic
352	Bondi Junction to Marrickville Metro via Oxford St, Crown St and King St
355	Bondi Junction to Marrickville Metro via Moore Park and Erskineville
356	Bondi Junction to Eastgardens
360	Bondi Junction to Clovelly
362	Rose Bay to Coogee
370	Glebe Point to Coogee
373	Coogee to City Museum (Loop Service)
373X	City Martin Place to Coogee (Express Service)
374	Central Belmore Park to Coogee via Bream St
374X	City Martin Place to Coogee via Bream St (Express Service)
375	Eastgardens to Randwick (Loop Service)
377X	City Martin Place to Maroubra Beach via South Coogee (Express Service)
379	Bronte to North Bondi
380	Bondi Junction to Watsons Bay via Bondi Beach
381	Bondi Junction to Tamarama (Loop Service)
386	Bondi Junction to Vaucluse via New South Head Rd and Old South Head Rd
387	Bondi Junction to South Head Cemetery
388	Paddington to Bondi Junction
390X	Bondi Junction to La Perouse (Express Service)
392	Redfern to Little Bay
392N	City Circular Quay to Matraville (Night Service)
392X	Little Bay to City Museum (Loop Service)
393	Eastgardens to Matraville
394X	La Perouse to City Museum (Express Service)
396	City Circular Quay to Maroubra Beach
396X	City Martin Place to Maroubra Beach (Express Service)
397	Eastgardens to South Maroubra (Loop Service)
397X	City Martin Place to South Maroubra (Express Service)
399	Little Bay to UNSW (Loop Service)

=== Region 10 ===
Region 10 initially covered the south western suburbs between Bankstown, Sutherland and Engadine. Other principal suburbs are Hurstville, Menai, and Miranda. It also operates services to Burwood, Parramatta and Liverpool.

When the region was established in 2005, it was operated by incumbent operator Connex that was later rebranded Veolia Transport, Veolia Transdev then Transdev NSW.

Region 11 was absorbed into Region 10 in September 2009. Region 10 then covered all of the Sutherland Shire. Caringbah Bus Service's routes were taken over by Veolia in October 2011.

On 1 January 2013, Transdev NSW commenced a new contract that was awarded without a competitive tendering process. Maianbar Bundeena Bus Service continue to operate route 989 from Bundeena as a subcontractor to Transdev. In December 2022, following a competitive tender process, U-Go Mobility was awarded a seven-year contract for region 10. The region also consolidated region 5 and expanded to cover Lakemba, Punchbowl, Roselands and Mortdale. The new contract commenced on 1 July 2023, with U-Go Mobility taking over Region 10 services from Transdev NSW and Region 5 services from Punchbowl Bus Company.

Region 10 routes
Route	Description
301	Eastgardens to Rosebery (Loop Service)
446	Roselands to St George Hospital
450	Hurstville to Strathfield
452	Rockdale to Beverly Hills
453	Rockdale Station to Percival Street Rockdale
455	St George Hospital to Kingsgrove
922	Bankstown to East Hills via Milperra
923	Bankstown to Panania via Picnic Point
924	Bankstown to East Hills via Panania
926	Bankstown to Revesby Heights
927	Padstow to One Tree Point
938	Mount Lewis to Lakemba
939	Greenacre to Bankstown
940	Hurstville to Bankstown via Riverwood
941	Hurstville to Chullora Marketplace via Roselands and Punchbowl
942	Campsie to Riverwood via Lakemba
944	Roselands to Bankstown via Punchbowl
945	Hurstville to Bankstown via Mortdale
946	Roselands to Bankstown via Lakemba and Greenacre
947	Hurstville to Kogarah via Dolls Point
948	Riverwood to Lugarno
949	Hurstville to Lugarno
950	Hurstville to Bankstown via Padstow
951	Roselands to Peakhurst
952	Hurstville to Roselands
953	Hurstville to Connells Point (Loop Service)
954	Hurstville to Hurstville Grove
955	Hurstville to Mortdale via Oatley
956	Mortdale to Peakhurst Heights (Loop Service)
958	Hurstville to Kogarah via Carss Park
959	Hurstville to Bald Face Point (Loop Service)
960	Bankstown to Sutherland
961	Miranda to Barden Ridge
962	Miranda to East Hills
963	Menai Marketplace to Alfords Point (Loop Service)
965	Sutherland to Woronora (Loop Service)
967	Miranda to Como West via Oyster Bay
968	Miranda to Bonnet Bay via Kareela
969	Sutherland to Cronulla
970	Hurstville to Miranda
971	Hurstville to Cronulla
972	Miranda to Sylvania via Sylvania Waters
973	Miranda to Yowie Bay (Loop Service)
974	Miranda to Gymea Bay (Loop Service)
975	Miranda to Grays Point (Loop Service)
976	Sutherland to Grays Point (Loop Service)
977	Miranda to Lilli Pilli (Loop Service)
978	Miranda to Dolans Bay via Port Hacking (Loop Service)
985	Miranda to Cronulla via Woolooware Bay
986	Miranda to Miranda North
987	Cronulla to Kurnell (Loop Service)
988	Caringbah to Cronulla via Burraneer
989	Bundeena to Maianbar (Loop Service)
991	Sutherland to Heathcote
992	Engadine to Kingswood Rd (Loop Service)
993	Miranda to Woronora Heights (Loop Service)
996	Engadine to Heathcote East (Loop Service)
N10	City Town Hall to Sutherland (Night Service)
N11	City Town Hall to Cronulla (Night Service)
N20	City Town Hall to Riverwood via Airport (Night Service)

=== Region 14 ===
Region 14 initially covered the Forest district including Chatswood, Belrose, Frenchs Forest, Terrey Hills, St Ives and Gordon. It also operates services to the Sydney CBD.

When the region was established in 2005, it was operated by incumbent operator Forest Coach Lines. It successfully bid to retain the region with a new contract commencing on 1 April 2013.

In October 2019, the NSW Government announced that it would open 13 out of the 14 contracts for competitive tender. In January 2022, tendering was opened for Regions 12, 14 and 4, closing on 14 April 2022. Transport for NSW has also indicated that Regions 12 and 14 may be procured together. In November 2022, CDC NSW (parent company of Forest Coach Lines) retained and was awarded a seven-year contract for Region 14. The region also consolidated Region 12 and expanded to cover the Upper North Shore and Hornsby to Hawkesbury River area, including Hornsby, Berowra and Brooklyn. The new contract commenced on 21 May 2023, with the Forest Coach Lines brand was phased out in favour the CDC NSW brand, and CDC NSW taking over Region 12 services from Transdev NSW.

Region 14 routes
Route	Description
141	Manly to Austlink via Seaforth and Frenchs Forest
142	Manly to Allambie Heights
193	Austlink to Warringah Mall via Frenchs Forest
194	City QVB to St Ives
194X	City QVB to St Ives (Express Service)
195	Gordon to St Ives Chase (Loop Service)
197	Macquarie University to Mona Vale via Gordon
260	North Sydney to Terrey Hills
270	City QVB to Terrey Hills
271	City QVB to Belrose
273	Killarney Heights to City QVB via Forestville
274	City QVB to Davidson via Frenchs Forest
277	Chatswood to Castle Cove (Loop Service)
278	Chatswood to Killarney Heights (Loop Service)
279	Chatswood to Frenchs Forest (Loop Service)
281	Chatswood to Davidson (Loop Service)
283	Chatswood to Belrose (Loop Service)
284	Chatswood to Terrey Hills and Duffys Forest
556	Lindfield to East Killara (Loop Service)
558	Lindfield to Chatswood
560	Gordon to West Pymble (Loop Service)
562	Macquarie University to Gordon
565	Macquarie University to Chatswood
571	Turramurra to South Turramurra (Loop Service)
572	Macquarie University to Turramurra via South Turramura and West Pymble
573	Turramurra to Sydney Adventist Hospital via Fox Valley Rd (Loop Service)
575	Macquarie University to Hornsby via Turramurra
576	Wahroonga to North Wahroonga (Loop Service)
576T	Turramurra to North Wahroonga (Loop Service)
577	Turramurra to North Turramurra (Loop Service)
577P	Turramurra to Murdoch St (Loop Service)
579	Pymble to East Turramurra (Loop Service)
582	Gordon to St Ives Shopping Centre
586	Pennant Hills to Westleigh
587	Hornsby to Westleigh (Loop Service)
588	Hornsby to Normanhurst West (Loop Service)
589	Hornsby to Sydney Adventist Hospital
591	St Ives to Hornsby
592	Brooklyn to Cheero Point and Mooney Mooney
593	Berowra to Mount Kuring-Gai Beaumont Rd
595	Hornsby to Mount Colah (Loop Service)
596	Hornsby to Hornsby Heights (Loop Service)
597	Berowra to Hornsby
598	Hornsby to Asquith (Loop Service)
599	Berowra to Berowra Heights (Loop Service)

== Former regions ==
=== Region 5 ===
Region 5 covered the south western suburbs between Strathfield, Bankstown and Hurstville. Other principal suburbs are Lakemba, Punchbowl, Roselands and Mortdale. It also operates services to Strathfield and Sydney Olympic Park.

Harris Park Transport routes operated in the St George area and Moore's Tours routes were transferred to Punchbowl Bus Co on 20 December 2004.

When the region was established in 2005, services were operated by incumbents Pleasure Tours and Punchbowl Bus Company. The Pleasure Tours routes were taken over by Punchbowl Bus Co on 10 July 2005. Punchbowl Bus Co successfully bid to retain the region with a new contract commencing on 1 July 2014. Eight years later, in December 2022, following another competitive tender process, Punchbowl Bus Co was unsuccessful in retaining the contract. U-Go Mobility was awarded a seven-year contract for region 10 which also consolidated region 5. Region 5 ceased to exist and U-Go Mobility took over bus services from Punchbowl Bus Co on 1 July 2023.

=== Region 11 ===
Region 11 covered the Miranda, Cronulla, Bundeena area in the Sutherland Shire. Other principal suburbs were Caringbah and Kurnell.

When the region was established in 2005, services were operated by incumbent operators Caringbah Bus Service, Crowthers and Maianbar Bundeena Bus Service. Crowthers' routes were taken over by Veolia Transport on 1 January 2009. Region 11 was absorbed into Region 10 on 21 September 2009.

=== Region 12 ===
Region 12 covered the Upper North Shore and Hornsby to Hawkesbury River area with a limited peak hour service extending to the Sydney CBD. Principal suburbs are Chatswood, Gordon, Hornsby, Berowra and Brooklyn.

When the region was established in 2005, services were operated by incumbent operator Shorelink, which was rebranded TransdevTSL Shorelink in 2008 and then Transdev Shorelink in 2010.

Following the merger of Transdev and Veolia Transport, Transdev Shorelink was merged into Transdev NSW. It successfully bid to retain the region with a new contract commencing on 1 June 2013.

In October 2019, the NSW Government announced that it would open 13 out of the 14 contracts for competitive tender. Transport for NSW also indicated that Regions 12 and 14 may be procured together. In January 2022, tendering was opened for Regions 12, 14 and 4, closing on 14 April 2022. In November 2022, CDC NSW was successfully awarded the contract for region 14 which also consolidated region 12. Region 12 ceased to exist and CDC NSW took over the services from Transdev NSW on 21 May 2023.

=== Region 13 ===
Region 13 covered the south western suburbs between Lidcombe, Granville, Bankstown and Liverpool. Other principal suburbs are Burwood and Parramatta.

When the region was established in 2005, services were operated by incumbent operators Connex (that was later rebranded Veolia Transport, Veolia Transdev then Transdev NSW) and Transit First. Some of the routes were previously operated by Baxter's Bus Lines and were transferred to Connex and Transit First on 1 January 2005. In February 2007. Connex purchased Transit First.

On 1 May 2013, Transdev NSW commenced a new contract that was awarded without a competitive tendering process. In December 2022, following a competitive tender process, Transit Systems NSW was awarded the contract for region 3 which also consolidated region 13. Region 13 ceased to exist and Transit Systems took over the services from Transdev on 6 August 2023.

=== Region 15 ===
Region 15 covered the south western suburbs between Campbelltown and Camden . Other principal suburbs were Narellan and Macarthur. It also operated services to Wollongong.

When the region was established in 2005, the region was operated by incumbent operator Busways. Following a competitive tendering process, on 1 June 2014 Busabout took over the operation of the region. Nine years later, in February 2023, following another competitive tender process, Transit Systems NSW was awarded the contract for region 2 which also consolidated region 15. Region 15 ceased to exist and Transit Systems took over the services from Busabout on 8 October 2023.

== Patronage ==
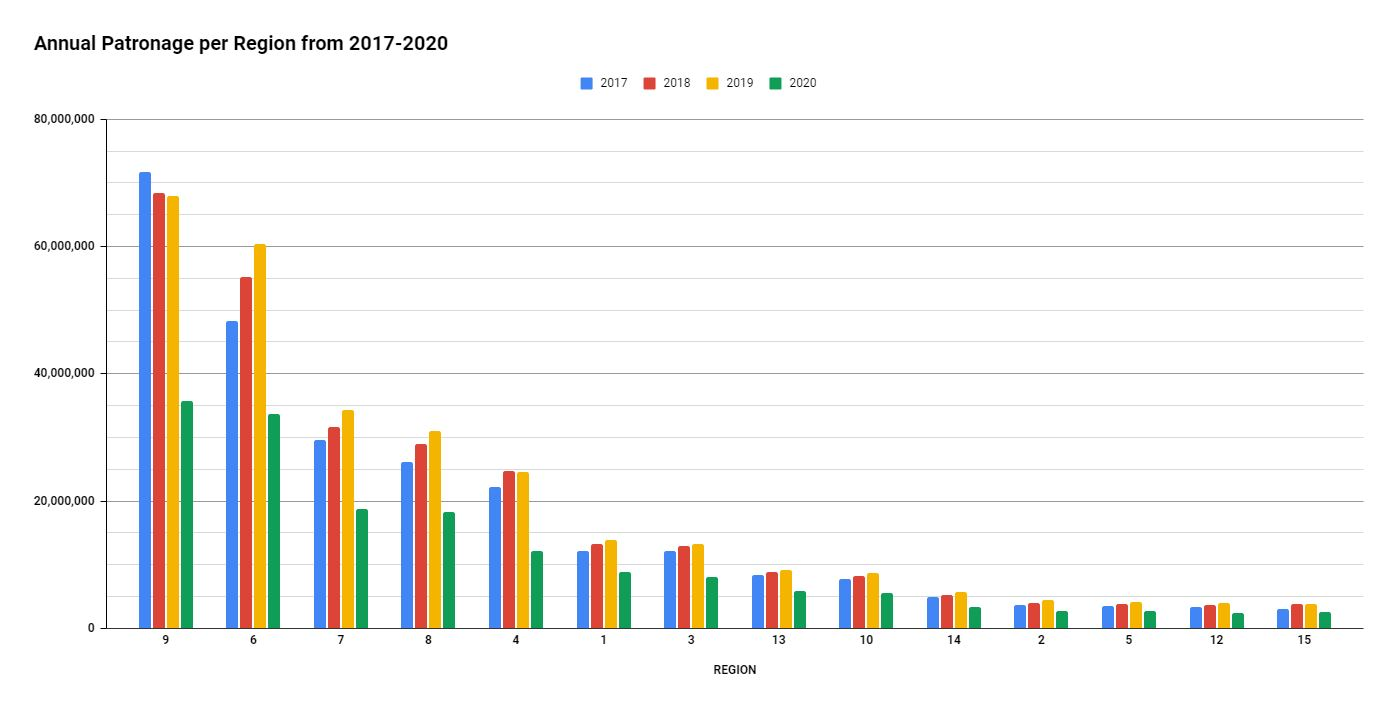
Patronage by Sydney Metropolitan Bus Contract region from 2017 to 2020

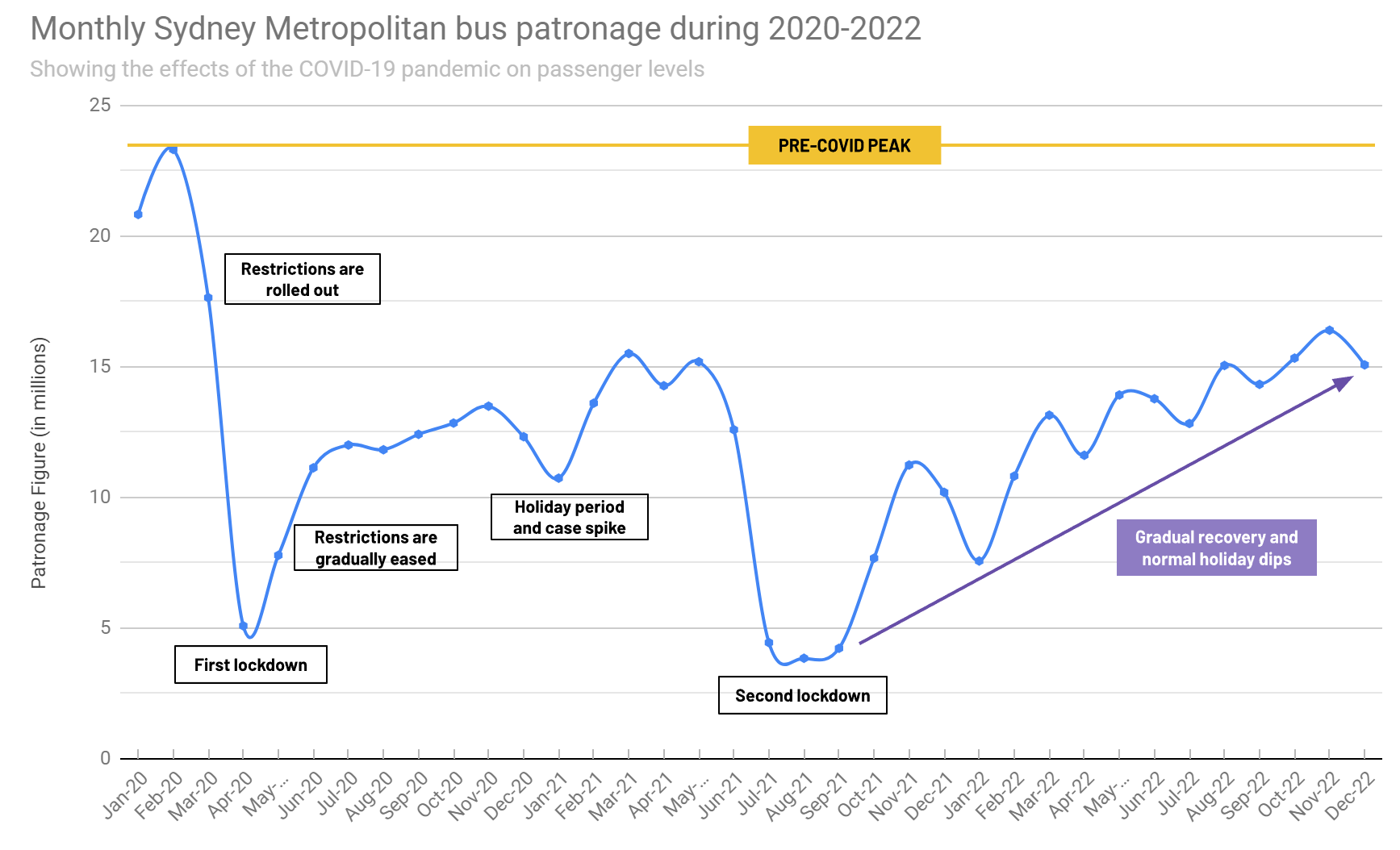
Diagram showing the impacts of the COVID-19 pandemic on Sydney Metropolitan bus patronage from 2020 to 2022

Annual Patronage per Region from 2017 to 2022
Rank	Region	Operator	2017	2018	2019	2020 (Note: Patronage was lower than previous years due to people staying at home and not taking public transport to school or work during the COVID-19 pandemic)	2021	2022	Total % Change 2017–19	Total % Change 2019–21
1	9	State Transit (till 2022) Transdev John Holland (from 2022)	71,684,642	68,363,589	67,869,614	35,720,364	26,054,388	35,152,671	-5.32%	-61.61%
2	6	State Transit (2017) Transit Systems (from 2018)	48,246,291	55,169,998	60,451,349	33,740,937	25,600,932	33,320,621	+25.30%	-57.65%
3	8	State Transit (till 2021) Keolis Downer (from 2021)	26,159,684	28,983,479	30,943,722	18,285,044	15,553,334	19,595,983	+18.29%	-49.74%
4	7	State Transit (till 2022) Busways (from 2022)	29,555,761	31,614,292	34,263,448	18,706,534	14,447,204	19,451,964	+15.93%	-57.83%
5	4	Hillsbus	22,147,493	24,708,501	24,554,212	12,111,689	9,517,589	13,288,118	+10.87%	-61.24%
6	1	Busways Western Sydney	12,139,979	13,236,871	13,816,261	8,838,952	6,700,613	8,121,394	+13.81%	-51.50%
7	3	Transit Systems	12,173,957	12,879,292	13,245,189	8,128,237	5,985,520	7,249,537	+8.80%	-54.81%
8	13	Transdev NSW	8,364,105	8,873,353	9,204,134	5,907,729	4,464,843	5,358,299	+10.04%	-51.49%
9	10	Transdev NSW and Maianbar Bundeena Bus Service	7,777,172	8,196,536	8,672,375	5,549,277	4,178,317	5,132,273	+11.51%	-51.82%
10	14	Forest Coach Lines	4,851,299	5,169,614	5,632,071	3,360,149	3,023,221	3,572,495	+16.09%	-46.32%
11	5	Punchbowl Bus Company	3,538,852	3,850,045	4,134,186	2,758,716	2,239,215	2,785,475	+16.82%	-45.84%
12	2	Interline Bus Service	3,664,100	3,928,593	4,432,147	2,797,068	2,131,462	2,473,229	+20.96%	-51.91%
13	12	Transdev NSW	3,412,400	3,601,886	3,997,576	2,335,640	1,813,076	2,285,795	+17.15%	-54.65%
14	15	Busabout	3,075,445	3,876,003	3,852,954	2,483,749	1,832,222	2,082,117	+25.28%	-52.45%
TOTAL			256,791,180	272,452,052	285,069,238	160,724,085	121,815,166	159,869,971	+11.01%	-57.27%

Annual Patronage per Region from 2023
Rank	Region	Operator	2023	2024	2025	Total % Change 2023–25
1	9	Transdev John Holland	49,418,431	52,481,629	54,261,558	+9.80%
2	6	Transit Systems	45,549,877	49,017,212	52,109,913	+14.40%
3	8	Keolis Downer	25,248,170	26,847,401	27,327,183	+8.23%
4	7	Busways	25,311,396	25,898,891	25,024,829	-1.13%
5	4	Hillsbus	17,796,352	18,686,322	18,377,669	+3.27%
6	3 (and 13 (Note: 2023 numbers include patronage data from Region 13 before it was merged with Region 3 in August 2023))	Transit Systems (and Transdev NSW until Aug 2023)	16,332,004	16,888,197	16,378,197	+0.28%
7	1	Busways Western Sydney	10,506,591	11,754,289	12,440,031	+18.40%
8	10 (and 5 (Note: 2023 numbers include patronage data from Region 5 before it was merged with Region 10 in July 2023))	U-Go Mobility (Transdev NSW, Maianbar Bundeena Bus Service and Punchbowl Bus Company until Jul 2023)	8,888,797	9,074,866	9,792,621	+10.17%
9	14 (and 12 (Note: 2023 numbers include patronage data from Region 12 before it was merged with Region 14 in May 2023))	CDC NSW (Forest Coach Lines and Transdev NSW until May 2023)	7,607,426	7,286,111	7,377,581	-3.02%
10	2 (and 15 (Note: 2023 numbers include patronage data from Region 15 before it was merged with Region 2 in October 2023))	Transit Systems (Interline Bus Service and Busabout until Oct 2023)	5,651,214	5,710,589	5,542,530	-1.92%
TOTAL			212,310,258	223,645,507	228,632,212	+7.69%

== See also ==
- Outer Sydney Metropolitan Bus Service Contracts
- Bus operators in Sydney
