= Campbellton =

Campbellton may refer to:

== Places ==
=== Canada ===
- Campbellton, New Brunswick
- Campbellton, Newfoundland and Labrador
- Campbellton, Prince Edward Island

=== United States ===
- Campbellton, Florida
- Campbellton, Georgia
- Campbellton, Missouri
- Campbellton, Texas

== Other uses ==
- Campbellton (Gerrardstown, West Virginia), a house on the National Register of Historic Places

== See also ==
- Campbelltown (disambiguation)
