= Cambell =

Cambell may refer to:

Cambell baronets in Essex:

- Sir John Cambell of Woodford, Bt. (died 1662)
- Cambell of Clay Hall (fl. 1664–1699)
  - Sir Thomas Cambell, 1st Bt. (c. 1620–1665)
  - Sir Thomas Cambell, 2nd Bt. (c. 1662–1668)
  - Sir Henry Cambell, 3rd Bt. (1663–1699)

Other real people:

- Cambell Nalder (1937–1987), Australian politician
- Dennis Cambell (1907–2000), British naval officer
- Iain Cambell (fl. 1980s), British breaststroke swimmer, Great Britain at the 1984 Summer Olympics
- Sir Thomas Cambell, iron monger, Lord Mayor of London 1609–1610

== See also ==
- Campbell (disambiguation)
