= Judge Campbell =

Judge Campbell may refer to:

- David G. Campbell (born 1952), judge of the United States District Court for the District of Arizona
- Edward Kernan Campbell (1858–1938), chief judge of the Court of Claims
- John Wilson Campbell (1782–1833), judge of the United States District Court for the District of Ohio
- Levin H. Campbell (born 1927), judge of the United States Court of Appeals for the First Circuit
- Marcus Beach Campbell (1866–1944), judge of the United States District Court for the Eastern District of New York
- Ralph E. Campbell (1867–1921), judge of the United States District Court for the Eastern District of Oklahoma
- Tena Campbell (born 1944), judge of the United States District Court for the District of Utah
- Todd J. Campbell (1956–2021), judge of the United States District Court for the Middle District of Tennessee
- William Joseph Campbell (1905–1988), judge of the United States District Court for the Northern District of Illinois
- William L. Campbell Jr. (born 1969), judge of the United States District Court for the Middle District of Tennessee

== See also ==
- Patricia E. Campbell-Smith (born 1966), judge of the United States Court of Federal Claims
- Justice Campbell (disambiguation)
