= Southern Cross Transit =

Australian bus operator

- Parent: Frank Oliveri
- Founded: 1980
- Headquarters: Karana Downs
- Service area: Ipswich
- Service type: Bus & coach operator
- Routes: School and Charter services/routes
- Depots: 1
- Fleet: 41 (May 2023)
- Website: www.southerncrosstransit.com.au

Southern Cross Transit is an Australian operator of school bus and charter services in the western suburbs of Brisbane and Ipswich in South East Queensland.

== History ==
Southern Cross Transit was formed in 1980 by former Lowe's Bus Service, Sydney proprietor Wally Horwood. It built up a network of school buses in the western suburbs of Brisbane and Ipswich.

In August 2002, Southern Cross Transit was purchased by the Oliveri family, proprietors of Interline Bus Services, Sydney. In August 2008, Southern Cross commenced operating a service between Ipswich and Indoorpilly. This ceased in June 2009.

== Fleet ==
As at June 2025, the fleet consisted of 49 buses and coaches.

== Depots ==
Southern Cross Transit operates out of depot in Karana Downs.

== See also ==
- Bus transport in Queensland
