= Campbell Township, Douglas County, Missouri =

Township in Missouri, U.S.

Coordinates: 36°51′01″N 92°47′59″W

Campbell Township is a township in southwestern Douglas County, in the U.S. state of Missouri.
