= Campbell Island =

Campbell Island may refer to:

- Campbell Island, Torres Strait, Queensland, Australia
- Campbell Island (British Columbia), Canada
- Campbell Island, New Zealand
- Campbell Island (Maine), USA
- Campbell Island (North Carolina), USA
