= Campbell County =

There are five counties in the United States of America named Campbell County:

- Campbell County, Kentucky
- Campbell County, South Dakota
- Campbell County, Tennessee
- Campbell County, Virginia
- Campbell County, Wyoming

Also:

- Campbell County, Georgia, a former county, part of Fulton County, Georgia since 1932
