= Campbell Motor Car Company =

Defunct American motor vehicle manufacturer

Emerson Motors Company
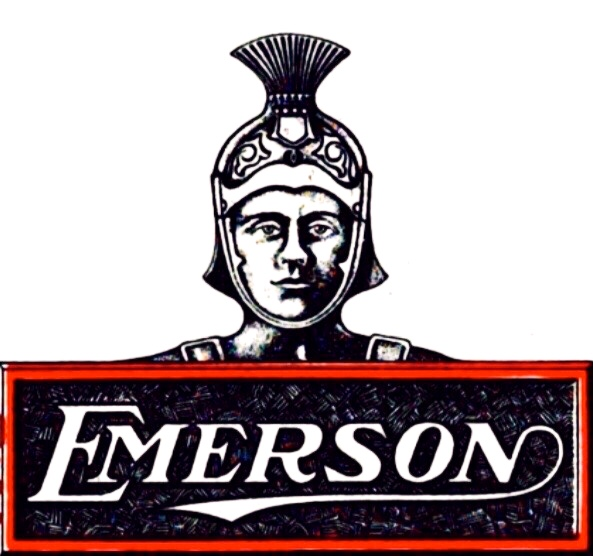
- Emerson Motors Company (1916-1917)

Overview
- Production: 1916-1917 Emerson

The Campbell Motor Car Company was an automobile manufacturer, in business for only one year, from 1918 to 1919.

== History ==
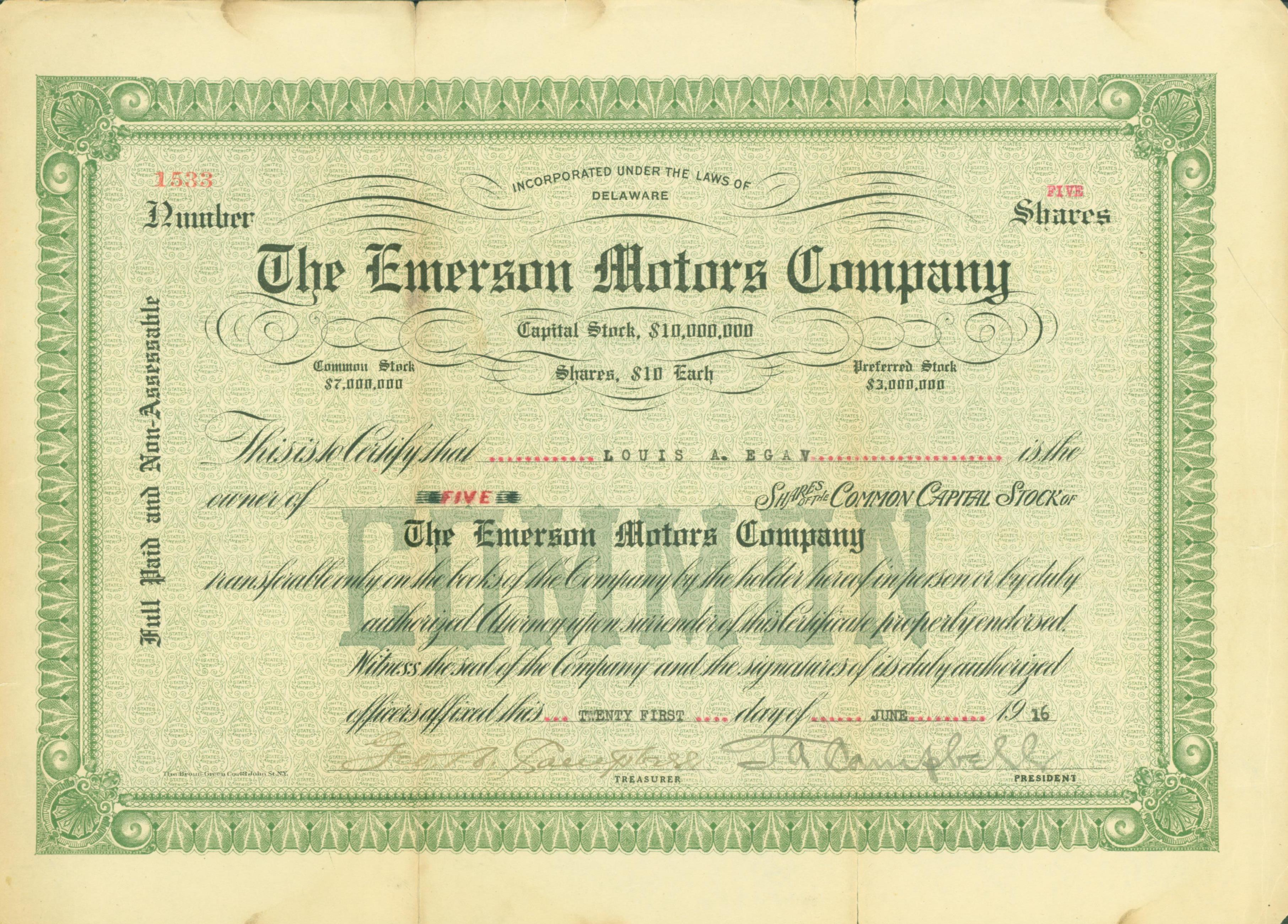
Share of the Emerson Motors Company, issued 21 June 1916

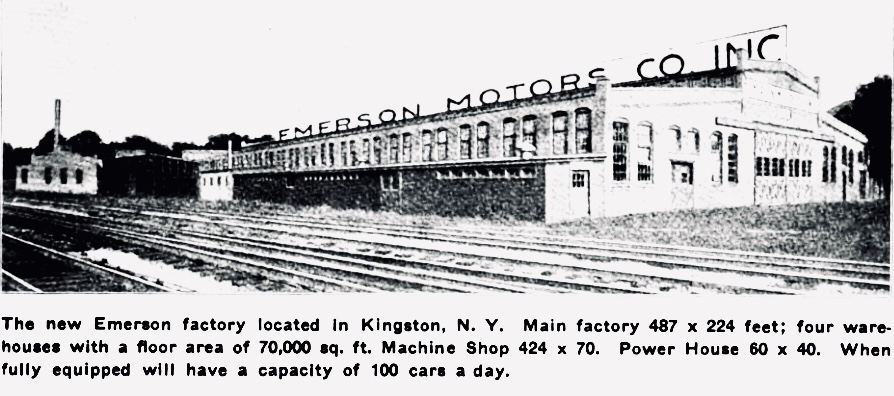
Emerson Factory in Kingston (1916)

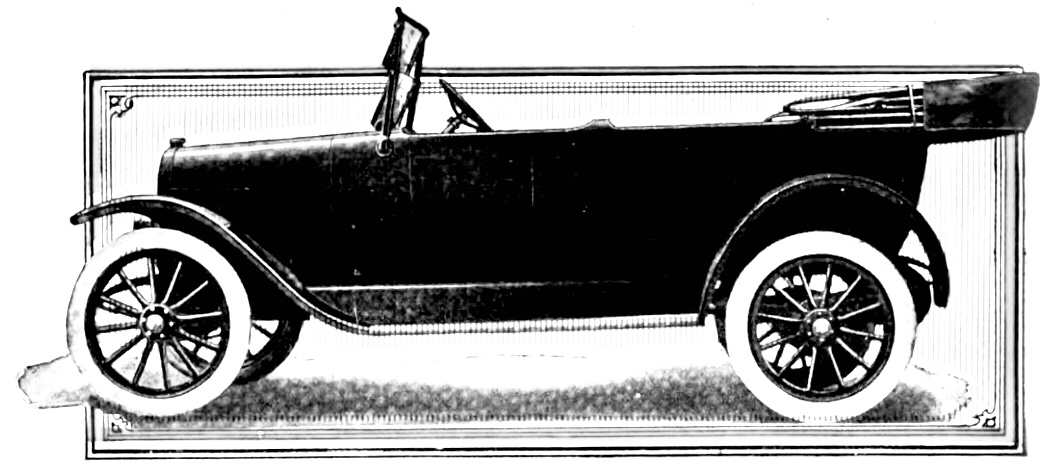
Emerson Four (1916-1917)

The Campbell Motor Car Company was originally called the Emerson Motors Company. But, in 1917, after the company was charged with stock manipulation, Theodore A. Campbell and his brother George renamed the company after themselves. While the car made by the Emerson company was $395, the new Campbell, a small, 4-cylinder 22 hp car, cost $835, compared to a Ford Model T Touring Car that cost $360. In May 1919, the company went into receivership. Less than 600 cars were made.
