= HMS Campbeltown =

Two ships of the Royal Navy have borne the name HMS Campbeltown, after Campbeltown in Scotland, with a third announced:

- HMS Campbeltown was a Town-class destroyer, formerly the Wickes-class destroyer USS Buchanan of the United States Navy. She was transferred to the Royal Navy as part of the 1940 Destroyers for Bases Agreement and was expended in the St Nazaire Raid in 1942.
- HMS Campbeltown was a Type 22 frigate launched in 1987, decommissioned in 2011 and scrapped in 2013.
- HMS Campbeltown will be a Type 31 frigate.

== Battle Honours ==
- Atlantic 1941–42
- St Nazaire 1942
