= Campbell Township =

Campbell Township may refer to:

== Arkansas ==
- Campbell Township, Lawrence County, Arkansas, in Lawrence County, Arkansas

== Indiana ==
- Campbell Township, Jennings County, Indiana
- Campbell Township, Warrick County, Indiana

== Michigan ==
- Campbell Township, Michigan

== Minnesota ==
- Campbell Township, Minnesota

== Missouri ==
- Campbell Township, Douglas County, Missouri, in Douglas County, Missouri
- Campbell Township, Polk County, Missouri

== North Dakota ==
- Campbell Township, Emmons County, North Dakota
- Campbell Township, Hettinger County, North Dakota, in Hettinger County, North Dakota

== South Dakota ==
- Campbell Township, Hand County, South Dakota, in Hand County, South Dakota
