= Neil Campbell (bishop of the Isles) =

Neil Campbell, M.A.
- Born: circa 1590
- Died: circa 1643–1647
- Education: University of Glasgow
- Spouse: Jean Boyd
- Parent: Neil Campbell
- Church: Church of Scotland
- Offices held: Minister of Glassary (1611–1633); Bishop of the Isles (1633–1638); Minister of Campbeltown (1642–1643/47)

Neil Campbell, M.A. (Scottish Gaelic: Niall Caimbeul) (c.1590 – c.1643/47) was a Scottish clergyman who served in the Church of Scotland as the Bishop of the Isles from 1633 to 1638.

The son of Neil Campbell, Bishop of Argyll, he was educated at the University of Glasgow, obtaining a Master of Arts degree in 1607. He became the minister of Glassary, Argyll in 1611, and married Jean, daughter of Adam Boyd (son of Thomas Boyd, 6th Lord Boyd) in 1620.

He was elected the bishop of the diocese of the Isles on 17 December 1633 and was confirmed by King Charles I on 21 January 1634. He was deprived of the see by the General Assembly on 13 December 1638.

After having signed the National Covenant and abjured Episcopacy, he was declared capable of the ministry by the Synod on 1 October 1640 and became the minister of Campbeltown on 10 November 1642.

He died sometime between 7 October 1643 and 29 April 1647.

== Bibliography ==
- Fryde, E. B.; Greenway, D. E.; Porter, S.; Roy, I., eds. (1986). Handbook of British Chronology (3rd, reprinted 2003 ed.). Cambridge: Cambridge University Press. ISBN 0-521-56350-X.
- Scott, Hew (1923). Fasti Ecclesiae Scoticanae. Vol. 4 (New ed.). Edinburgh: Oliver and Boyd.
- Scott, Hew (1928). Fasti Ecclesiae Scoticanae. Vol. 7 (New ed.). Edinburgh: Oliver and Boyd.
