= Justice Campbell =

Justice Campbell may refer to:

- John Archibald Campbell (1811–1889), associate justice of the United States Supreme Court
- Archibald Campbell, 2nd Earl of Argyll (c. 1465–1513), Lord High Chancellor of Scotland
- Colin Campbell, 1st Earl of Argyll (c. 1433–1493), Lord Chancellor of Scotland
- David Campbell (judge, born 1750) (1750–1812), associate justice of the Tennessee Supreme Court
- Dwight Campbell (c. 1888–1964), associate justice of the South Dakota Supreme Court
- George W. Campbell (1769–1848), associate justice of the Tennessee Supreme Court
- J. R. Campbell (judge) (1918–1990), associate justice of the Oregon Supreme Court
- James G. Campbell (1811–1868), associate justice of the Louisiana Supreme Court
- James U. Campbell (1866–1937), chief justice of the Oregon Supreme Court
- John Campbell, 1st Baron Campbell (1779–1861), chief justice of the Queen's Bench
- Josiah Abigail Patterson Campbell (1830–1917), chief justice of the Mississippi Supreme Court
- Preston W. Campbell (1874–1954), associate justice and chief justice of the Virginia Supreme Court of Appeals
- Ralph Abercromby Campbell (fl. 1960s–1970s), chief justice of the Bahamas from 1960 to 1970
- Robert M. Campbell (born 1935), justice of the Texas Supreme Court
- William Campbell (judge) (1758–1834), chief justice of Upper Canada
- William W. Campbell (New York congressman) (1806–1881), ex officio judge of the New York Court of Appeals
- James Lang Campbell (1858–1936), judge of the Supreme Court of New South Wales
- Joseph Campbell (judge) (born 1949), judge of the Supreme Court of New South Wales
- Stephen Campbell (judge) (fl. 2010s–2020s), judge of the Supreme Court of New South Wales

== See also ==
- Judge Campbell (disambiguation)
