= Campbell, Michigan =

- Unincorporated community
- Location within the state of Michigan
- Coordinates: 46°01′02″N 87°07′53″W
- Country: United States
- State: Michigan
- County: Delta
- Township: Maple Ridge
- Elevation: 866 ft (264 m)
- Time zone: UTC-5 (Eastern (EST))
  - Summer (DST): UTC-4 (EDT)
- ZIP code(s): 49880
- Area code: 906
- GNIS feature ID: 1617473

Campbell is an unincorporated community in Delta County, in the U.S. state of Michigan.

== History ==
The community was named for Robert Campbell, a railroad contractor.
