= Campbellton (Gerrardstown, West Virginia) =

Historic house in West Virginia, United States

- U.S. National Register of Historic Places
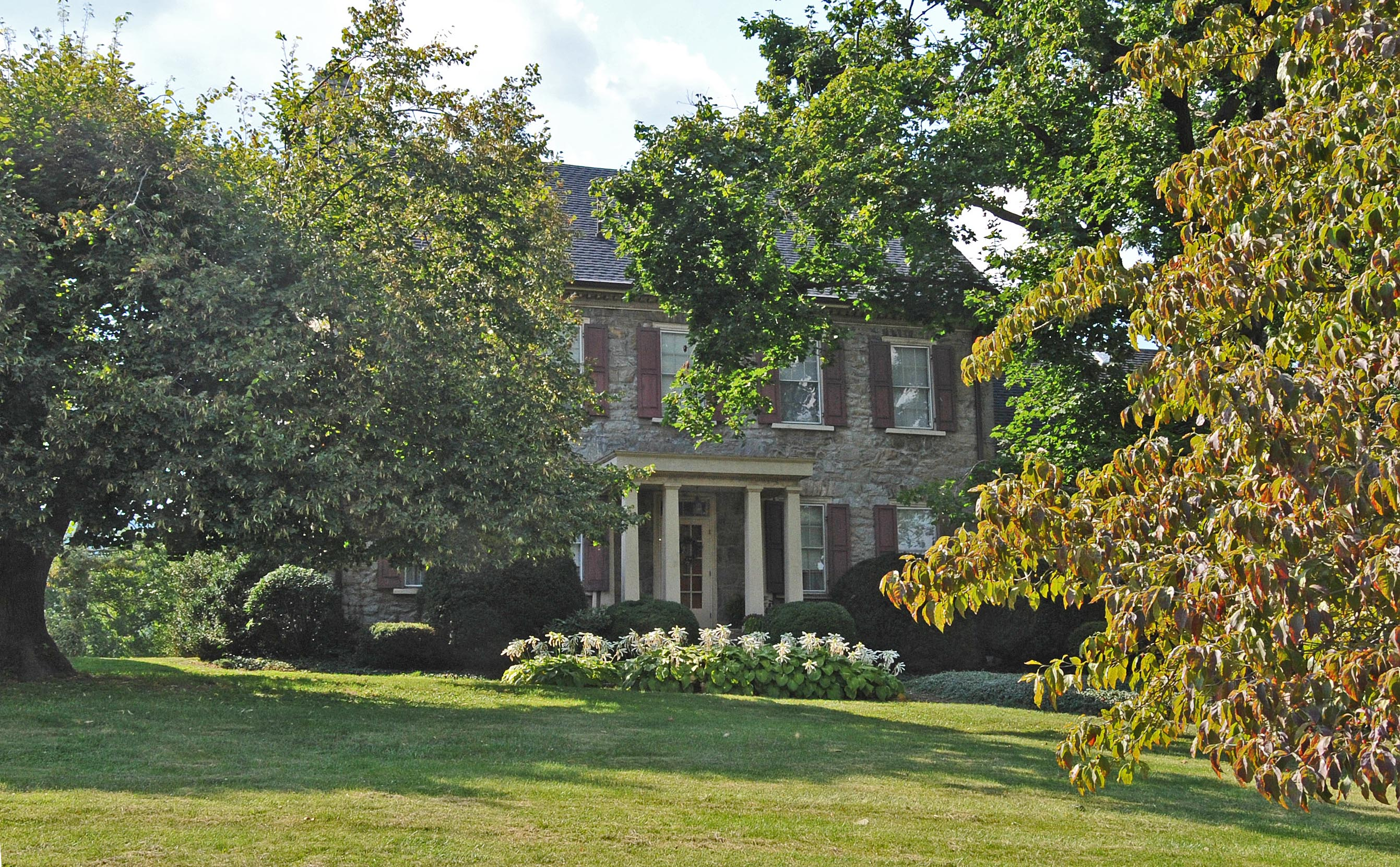

- Location within West Virginia Location within the United States
- Location: Address Unknown, Gerrardstown, West Virginia
- Coordinates: 39°24′20″N 78°4′16″W
- Built: 1780
- Architect: Campbell, James
- Architectural style: Georgian
- MPS: Berkeley County MRA
- NRHP reference No.: 80004411
- Added to NRHP: December 10, 1980

Campbellton is a house near Gerrardstown, West Virginia built circa 1800 by James Campbell. Campbell, who was born in Ireland in 1744, arrived in America with his father in 1753, settling in Berkeley County, West Virginia in 1762. Campbell built a store on the property in 1780, along with a complex of accessory buildings, before building the main house.

The main house is a two-story structure of coursed rubble limestone. The two-story house is five bays wide. A rear kitchen ell was demolished due to deterioration, but was reconstructed in 1975 in a manner sympathetic to the main house. The main block is a center-hall plan, with two rooms to each side of the stair hall. Outbuildings include the store, which retains its original shelving. An 1802 barn completes the ensemble.

The house was listed on the National Register of Historic Places in 1980.
