= Campbelltown =

Campbelltown or Campbeltown can refer to:

== Places ==
In Scotland

- Campbeltown, Kintyre, Argyll
- Campbelltown of Ardersier, near Inverness, often now just referred to as Ardersier to avoid confusion.

In Australia

- Towns/suburbs:
  - Campbelltown, New South Wales
    - Campbelltown Hospital
    - Campbelltown Stadium, a sports ground used most often for Rugby League matches
  - Campbelltown, South Australia
  - Campbell Town, Tasmania
- Government areas:
  - Electoral district of Campbelltown, state electoral district in New South Wales
  - City of Campbelltown (New South Wales), local government area in New South Wales
  - City of Campbelltown, South Australia, local government area in South Australia
  - Electoral district of Campbell Town, former state electoral district in Tasmania

In Guyana

- Campbelltown, Guyana

In New Zealand

- Campbelltown, the former name of the town Bluff

In the United States

- Campbelltown, Indiana
- Campbell Town, NY, a redirect to Campbell, NY
- Campbelltown, Pennsylvania

== See also ==
- Campbeltown (disambiguation)
- Campbellton (disambiguation)
- Campbell (disambiguation)
- Campbleton-Charlotteville, Tobago
