= Campbellton, Prince Edward Island =

Settlement in Prince Edward Island, Canada

Campbellton
- Settlement
- Location of Campbellton in Prince Edward Island
- Coordinates: 46.792°N 64.302°W
- Country: Canada
- Province: Prince Edward Island
- County: Prince County
- Elevation: 14 m (46 ft)

Campbellton is a settlement in Prince Edward Island.

== Climate ==
Climate data for Campbellton
Month	Jan	Feb	Mar	Apr	May	Jun	Jul	Aug	Sep	Oct	Nov	Dec	Year
Record high °C (°F)	14 (57)	8 (46)	13 (55)	16 (61)	20 (68)	24 (75)	28 (82)	28 (82)	25 (77)	19 (66)	19 (66)	13 (55)	28 (82)
Mean daily maximum °C (°F)	−4.11 (24.60)	−3.82 (25.12)	−0.35 (31.37)	4.83 (40.69)	10.29 (50.52)	16.64 (61.95)	21.91 (71.44)	22.49 (72.48)	17.84 (64.11)	11.15 (52.07)	4.99 (40.98)	0.32 (32.58)	8.47 (47.25)
Daily mean °C (°F)	−6.44 (20.41)	−6.2 (20.8)	−2.25 (27.95)	2.84 (37.11)	7.86 (46.15)	13.78 (56.80)	19.29 (66.72)	19.92 (67.86)	15.36 (59.65)	9.4 (48.9)	3.52 (38.34)	−1.08 (30.06)	6.33 (43.39)
Mean daily minimum °C (°F)	−10.04 (13.93)	−10.44 (13.21)	−4.96 (23.07)	−0.28 (31.50)	4.02 (39.24)	10.08 (50.14)	15.58 (60.04)	16.45 (61.61)	12.1 (53.8)	6.91 (44.44)	0.67 (33.21)	−3.99 (24.82)	3.01 (37.42)
Record low °C (°F)	−21 (−6)	−24 (−11)	−16 (3)	−8 (18)	−7 (19)	1 (34)	10 (50)	9 (48)	6 (43)	−4 (25)	−10 (14)	−16 (3)	−24 (−11)
Average precipitation mm (inches)	49.74 (1.96)	38.01 (1.50)	30.4 (1.20)	38.15 (1.50)	37.49 (1.48)	37.94 (1.49)	32.2 (1.27)	33.87 (1.33)	42.07 (1.66)	43.21 (1.70)	60.75 (2.39)	39.1 (1.54)	482.93 (19.02)
Average precipitation days	4.36	3.64	3.82	3.91	3.09	2.73	4.0	2.73	2.73	3.45	4.55	4.27	43.28
Average relative humidity (%)	84.68	84.36	82.99	77.57	75.81	77.74	80.99	76.08	74.08	74.74	77.41	78.4	78.74
Mean monthly sunshine hours	5.29	7.6	8.16	8.89	12.57	14.98	14.43	10.76	10.09	8.8	5.65	4.66	111.88
Source: Weather and Climate
