= Neil Campbell (bishop of Argyll) =

- Bishop of Argyll
- Church: Church of Scotland
- Diocese: Diocese of Argyll
- In office: 1580–1608
- Predecessor: James Hamilton
- Successor: John Campbell (son)

Orders
- Consecration: 1580

Personal details
- Died: January 1613 or before 21 July 1627
- Spouse: Christine Carswell

Neil Campbell (Scottish Gaelic: Niall Caimbeul) (died c. 1613 or 1627) was the son of Alexander, son of the parson [MacPherson] ("Alasdair mac a' Phearsain"), a member of the Campbells of Carnassarie.

He is probably the Nigellus Campbell who graduated from the University of St Andrews in 1575 as Master of Arts. The Neil Campbell who was recorded as the parson of Kilmartin and precentor of Lismore Cathedral in 1574 is probably him too.

Following the death of James Hamilton in 1580, Neil Campbell became Bishop of Argyll. In March 1588, he examined witnesses in a civil dispute on behalf of the Privy Council, and in the following year the Privy Council placed him in charge of the commission against catholics in Argyll; in August of that year (i.e. 1589), the Moderator of the General Assembly, Patrick Galloway, appointed Neil as one of the Assembly's assessors.

He married Christine, daughter of John Carswell, Bishop of the Isles and his predecessor as parson of Kilmartin. With Christine, he had several children. His eldest was John Campbell, who went on to become his father's successor as Bishop of Argyll; another son, Neil, became Bishop of the Isles. He had at least four other children: Colin, Alexander, Donald and a daughter whose name is unknown.

He resigned his see to his son sometime between January and June 1608; he died in January 1613 or before 21 July 1627.

== Notes ==
Religious titles
Preceded by James Hamilton	Bishop of Argyll; 1580–1608	Succeeded by John Campbell
