= Trams in Sydney =

Former Australian public transport system

Sydney tramway network
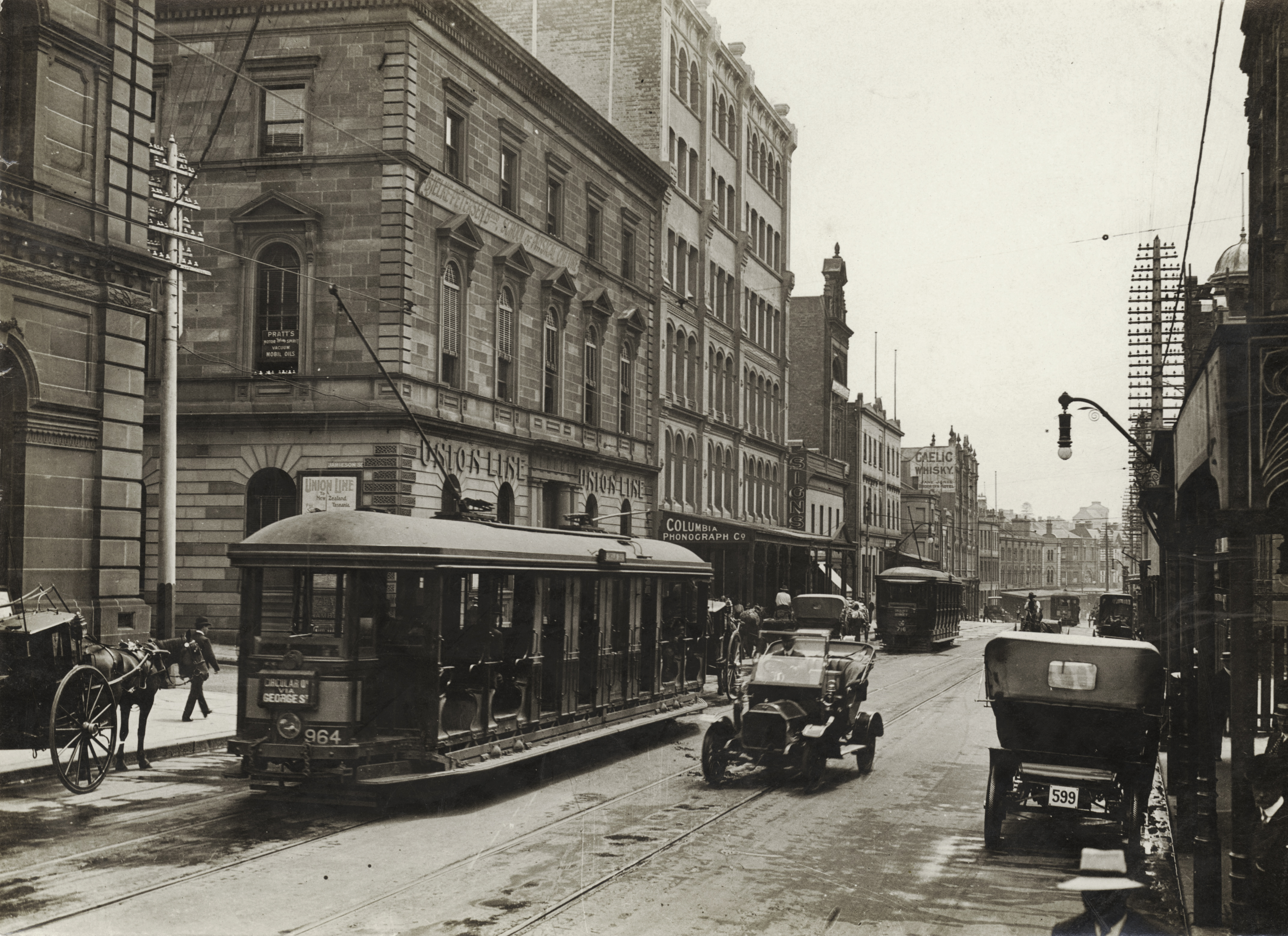
- Trams on George Street, 1920.

Operation
- Locale: Sydney, New South Wales, Australia

Statistics
Horsecar era: 1861–1866
- Track gauge: 1,435 mm (4 ft 8 1/2 in)
- Propulsion system: Horses
Steam era: 1879–1910
- Track gauge: 1,435 mm (4 ft 8 1/2 in)
- Propulsion system: Steam (and horses/cables)
Electric era: 1898–1961
- Track gauge: 1,435 mm (4 ft 8 1/2 in)
- Propulsion system: Electric
- Electrification: 600 Volts DC
- Route length: 291 km (181 mi) (1923)
- Patronage (1945): 405 million

The Sydney tramway network served the inner suburbs of Sydney, New South Wales, Australia, from 1879 until 1961. In its heyday, it was the largest in Australia, the second largest in the Commonwealth of Nations after London, and one of the largest in the world.

The network was heavily used, with about 1,600 cars in service at any one time at its peak during the 1930s. In comparison, there are about 500 trams in Melbourne today. Patronage peaked in 1945 at 405 million passenger journeys. Its maximum street trackage totalled 291 km (181 miles) in 1923.

A new era of light rail in Sydney began in 1997.

== History ==
=== Early tramways ===
Sydney's first tram was horse-drawn, running from the old Sydney railway station to Circular Quay along Pitt Street.

Built in 1861, the design was compromised by the desire to haul railway freight wagons along the line to supply city businesses and return cargo from the docks at Circular Quay with passenger traffic as an afterthought.

This resulted in a track that protruded from the road surface and it caused damage to the wheels of wagons trying to cross it. Hard campaigning by competing Horse Omnibus owners – as well as a fatal accident involving the leading Australian musician Isaac Nathan in 1864 – led to closure in 1866.

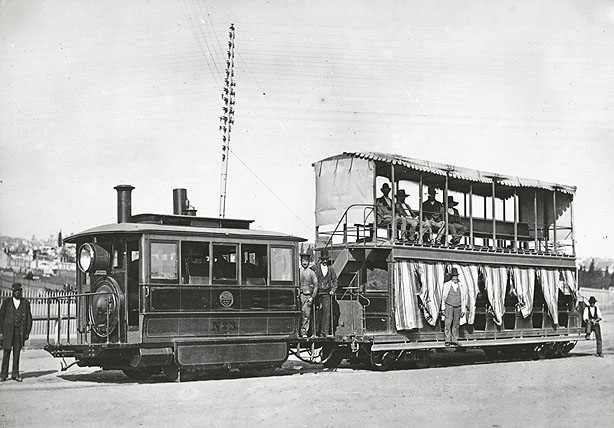
A steam tram, 1879

In 1879 a steam tramway was established in conjunction with the upcoming Sydney International Exhibition that was to be held in the Domain/Botanical Gardens area of Sydney. Originally planned by the government to be removed after the exhibition, the success of the steam tramway led to the system being expanded rapidly through the city and inner suburbs during the 1880s and 1890s.

The Steam Trams in Sydney comprised a Baldwin steam tram motor hauling one or more trailers of either single deck or double deck construction. Unlike the earlier horse tramway, the steam tramway used grooved rail for on-street running.

Preserved Sydney Steam Trams are Motor 1A, owned by the Powerhouse Museum and is usually stored at the "Discovery Centre" at Castle Hill. It is currently on loan to the Sydney Tramway Museum at Loftus (currently non-operational), Motor 100A (operational) at the Museum of Transport & Technology, Auckland New Zealand as it was sold to Wanganui Tramways in 1910 and Motor 103A which operates with a former trailer car 93B at Valley Heights Rail Museum after previously being at Parramatta Park.

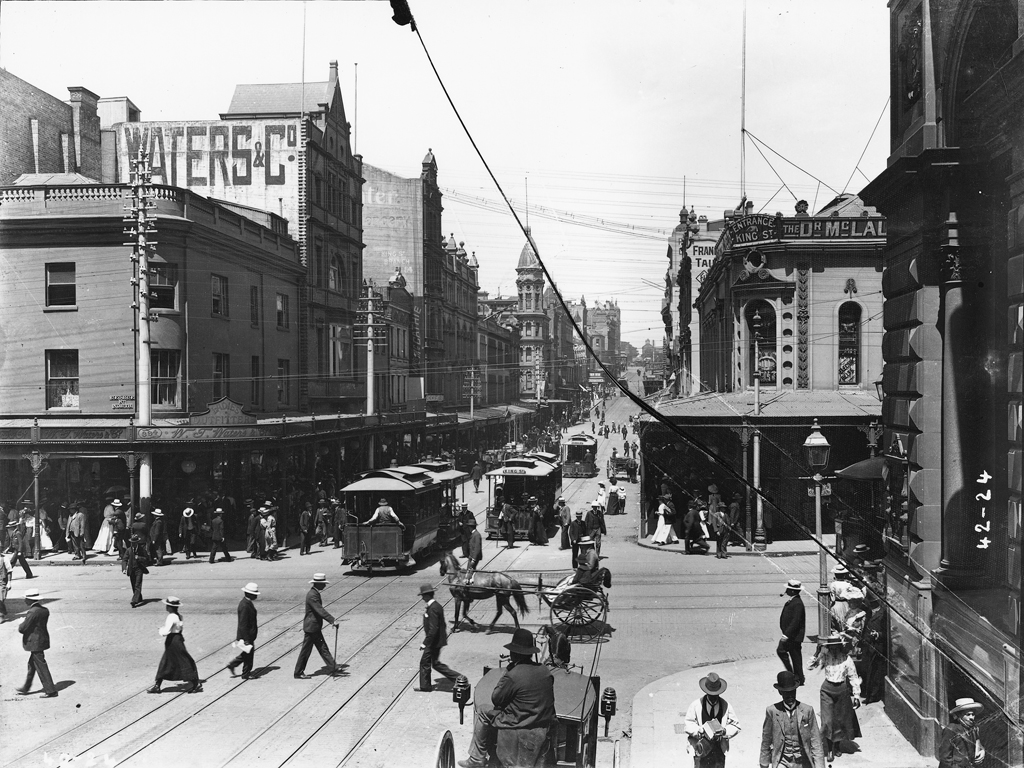
Cable trams in King Street, Sydney, 1900.

Two cable tram routes were built in Sydney. The first route ran from the original Milsons Point ferry wharf in North Sydney to near Falcon Street North Sydney and was later extended to Crows Nest. Construction of a cable line north of harbour was due to the steep terrain involved from Milsons Point to North Sydney. The second route ran from King Street Wharf on the eastern side of Darling Harbour to Ocean Street Edgecliff. Cable Trailer 23 is preserved at the Sydney Tramway Museum at Loftus.

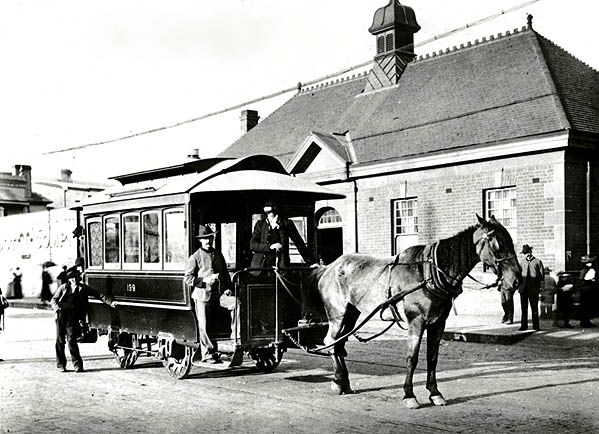
The horsedrawn tram which ran between Newtown and St Peters stations in 1894

Horse trams operated between Newtown and St Peters railway stations in the 1890s and between Manly and North Manly from 1903 to 1907. In these later instances, the operation of horse tram services was to save costs in times of low patronage on lines intended for steam tram services.

=== Electrification ===
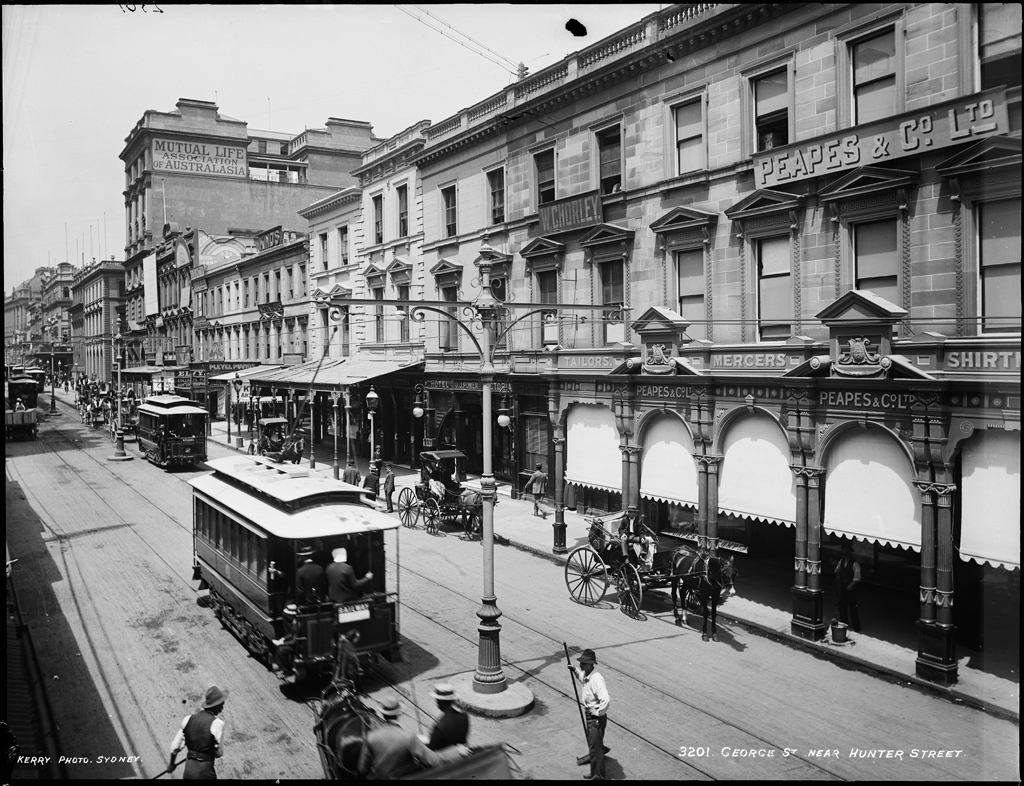
C Class trams on George Street near Hunter Street

The Sydney tram power supply system was built using New York City subway electrical equipment that was adapted for tram usage. A generating plant was installed at Ultimo and White Bay Power Stations.

Electrification started in 1898, and most of the system was converted by 1910. An exception was the privately owned Parramatta line built by Charles Edward Jeanneret in 1881 to Redbank Wharf (Duck River) where the steam tram remained until 1943 which was operated by Sydney Ferries Ltd.

After experimentation with three trams, built by John Stephenson in New York and fitted rheostatic controllers, on the Waverley extension line and later at North Sydney, the early locally built single-truck were based on US designs, with C-class saloon cars, followed by D-class combination cars. A number of other Australian and New Zealand cities also used similar designs.

Cross-bench "toast rack" trams had proved to be very efficient "crowd swallowers" in Sydney steam tram operation, so the steam tram style was adopted for later locally built electric trams. This resulted in the E-class (that ran in a permanently coupled set), J-class and the K-class, and the more famous O-class, O/P-class, P-class and L/P-class bogie trams that required the conductor to collect fares from the footboard running along the side of the tram, as they had no corridor through the middle connecting each compartment.

Though revered for the number of passengers they could move, footboard trams were deathtraps for the conductors working them. On average, each day one conductor fell or was knocked off the footboard by passing motor vehicles as they became more popular. In 1923, 1924, 1925, there were 282, 289, and 233 accidents respectively to conductors on NSW tramways. The majority suffered a fractured skull. From 1916 to 1932, there were 4,097 accidents to tram employees. From 1923 to 1931, there were 10,228 accidents to passengers having falls when alighting or boarding. 63 of the falls were fatal. Of the more than 100 falls reported of conductors, one quarter died from their injuries.

In 1933 the R-class tram was introduced. It was a drop-centre saloon tram, which was being adopted elsewhere in Australia. Footboard trams were widely used until the late 1950s, despite calls as early as 1934 by the tram union for them to be modified. Four P Class trams were refitted with the same windows, centre door and internal layout as the R1 class, to create the PR1 class, but otherwise there was no modification of footboard trams to a safer corridor tram design.

Apart from the G, H and M classes, one of every electric tram class, and in some cases two or more, have been preserved by the Sydney Tramway Museum at Loftus NSW.

=== Demise and closure ===
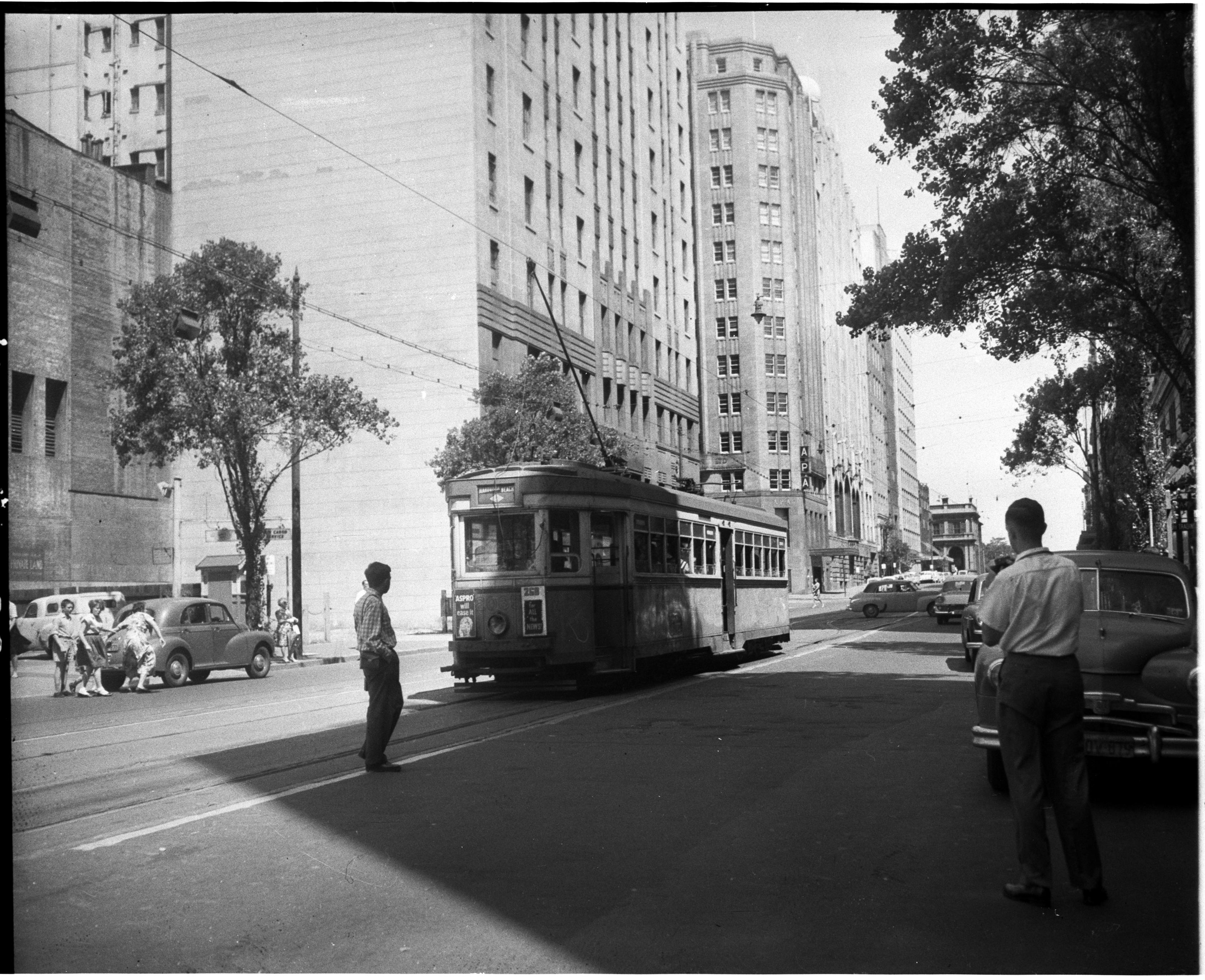
The last day of trams, Rural Bank tram stop, corner Martin Place and Elizabeth Street, 25 February 1961

By the 1920s, the system had reached its maximum extent. In many ways, the Sydney tram system was a victim of its own success. The overcrowded and heaving trams running at a high frequency, in competition with growing private motor car and bus use, ended up being blamed for the congestion caused by the latter.

Competition from the private car and unregulated private bus operators created the perception of traffic congestion which began the gradual closure of lines from the late 1930s.

Material shortages and lack of funding caused by the Second World War had caused the system to become rundown from poor maintenance. The perception of the government was that the financial cost of upgrading infrastructure and purchasing new trams would bankrupt the state.

This led to the government's calling on overseas transport experts to advise the city on its post-war transport issues, and this led to the recommendation that closure of the system was the best option for the state of NSW.

In 1948, Premier McGirr imported three London experts to advise on road transport systems. In 1949, they produced a major report which proposed a systematic phasing out of trams by 1960. They recommended the acquisition of double-decked buses to ease traffic congestion and yield substantial financial benefits. They suggested that buses would be more efficient at handling racecourse and showground traffic. The government accepted the principle in the report.

Probably as a result of the extent of popular affection for the trams, the conversion program proceeded more slowly than the report had proposed. The prestigious Ebasco group of American transit consultants had strongly endorsed the policy in a memorandum of May, 1957. An examination of election policy speeches does not reveal political motives in the tram/bus question. The Labor Party was genuinely concerned for the travelling public's interests.

The closure was supported by the NRMA, who stood to gain from increased membership, but generally went against public opinion as most of the patronage were those who could not afford to purchase private transportation.

In the early 1950s, closure became government policy, and the system was wound down in stages. Withdrawal of services was completed on 25 February 1961 when R1 class tram 1995 returned from La Perouse to Randwick Workshops just before 4:40pm on 25 February 1961, which was driven by Jerry Valek, a Czechoslovak man from Annandale.

It was alleged after the tramways were closed that there were many other influences on the government to close down the system. These allegedly came from the rubber and petrol industries, motor vehicle (bus) manufacturers and those opposed to increased public expenditure. The allegations had some elements based on the General Motors streetcar conspiracy that occurred in the USA due to the use of "overseas experts".

== City service ==
=== Circular Quay to Central Station ===
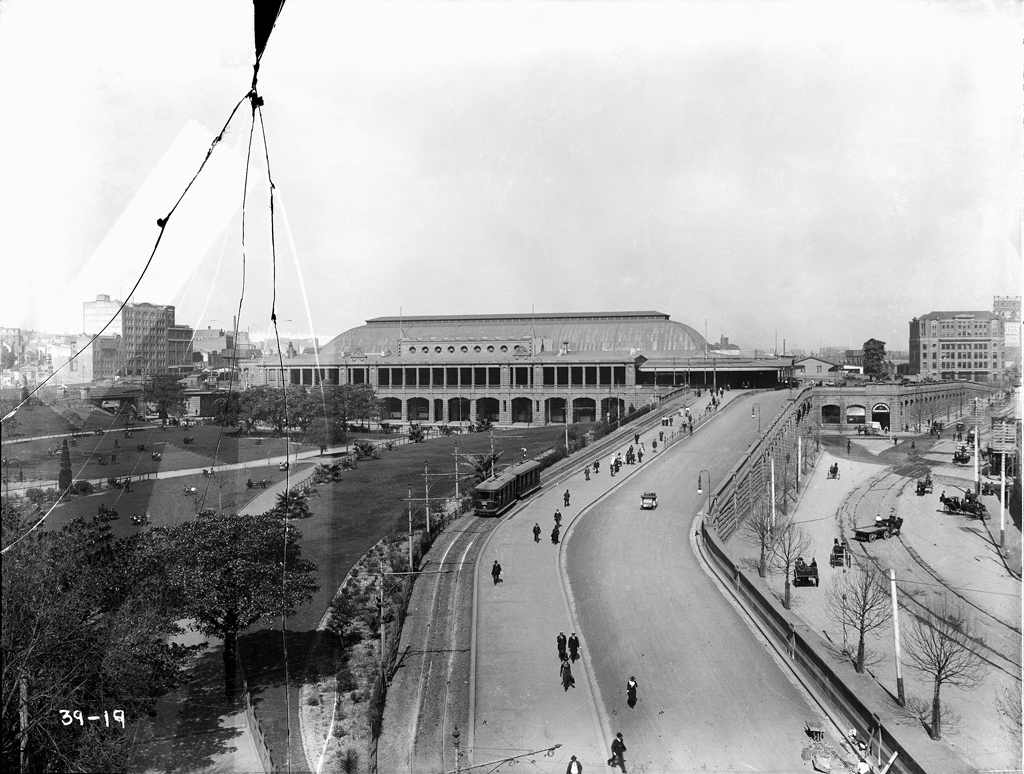
The approach to Central station, about 1912 with a coupled set of E class trams climbing to the colonnade, Pitt Street lines are to the right

This was an extremely busy service for passengers transferring from suburban trains at Central, particularly prior to the opening of the city underground railway lines in 1926. Trams operated from Central station across Eddy Avenue, along Castlereagh Street via Bligh, Bent and Loftus Streets to Alfred Street, Circular Quay and returned via Pitt Street in a large anti-clockwise loop. The tram lines down Pitt and Castlereagh streets closed on 27 September 1957.

These tracks were also used as the city route for some eastern and south-western routes during busy periods as opposed to Elizabeth Street. The services could also be short worked via Bent and Spring Streets at times when Circular Quay was busy or unavailable.

The sandstone viaduct onto the colonnade at Central station were built across Eddy Avenue for this service, and are being used again today by trams of a sort in the form of the Inner West Light Rail system, however they are operating in the opposite direction.

== Eastern suburbs lines ==
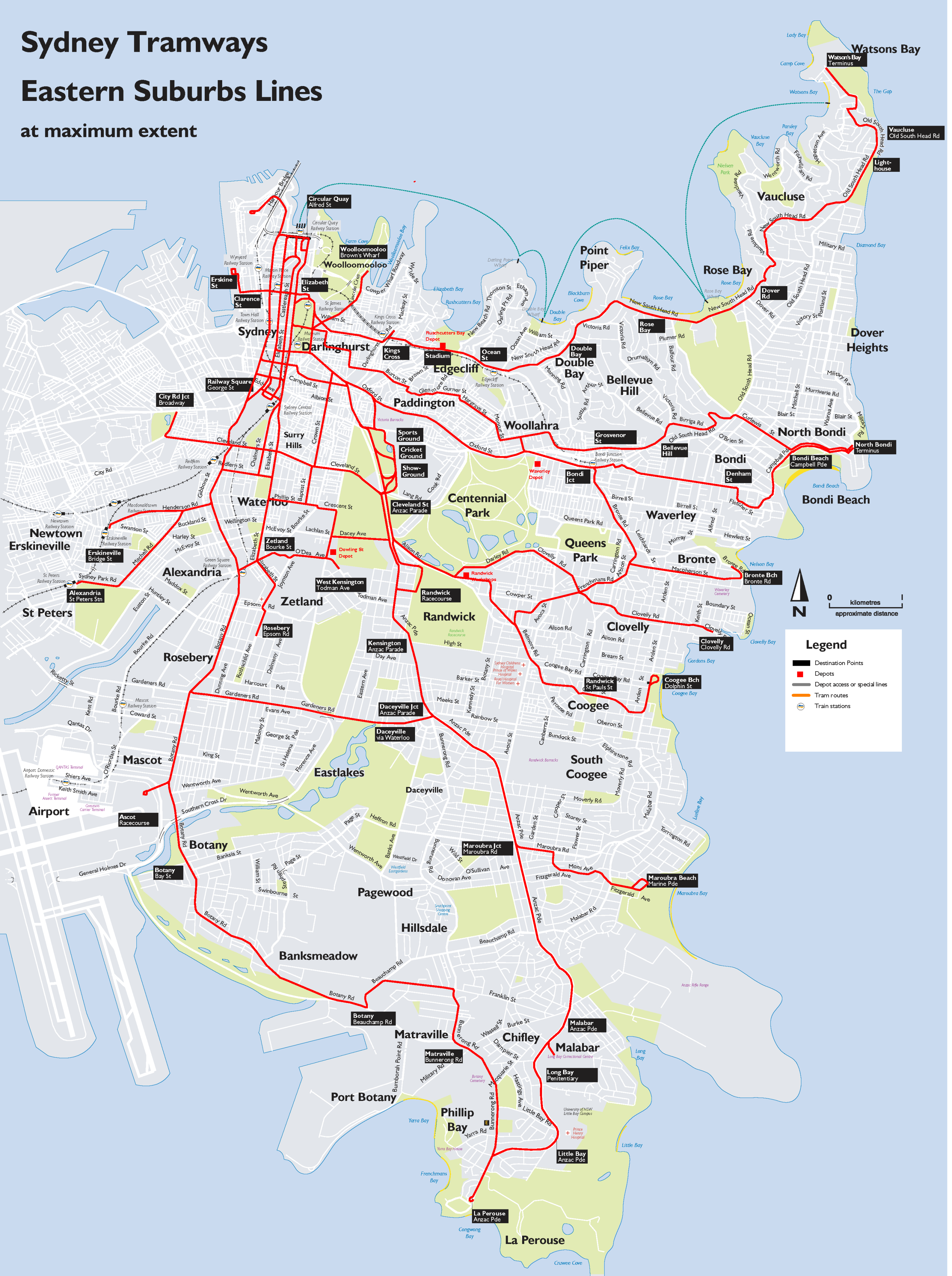
A map of the Eastern suburbs lines

Circular Quay was the focal terminal point of most services to the eastern suburbs, and allowed easy transfer to ferries. For many years, 27 regular services operated from Circular Quay. A number of full-time services also operated from a secondary terminus at Railway Square.

=== Watsons Bay line ===
The Rushcutters Bay Tram Depot, which served this line, was located on New South Head Road at Rushcutters Bay on the north side of the road.

This line, which was first laid down as a cable tramway, began at a loop at the corner of Erskine and Day Streets near Wynyard station then proceeded south down Day Street, turning left into King Street and operated as an isolated electric tramway from October 1898 until January 1905 when electric services were extended to the Erskine Street terminus and the cable tramway was closed.

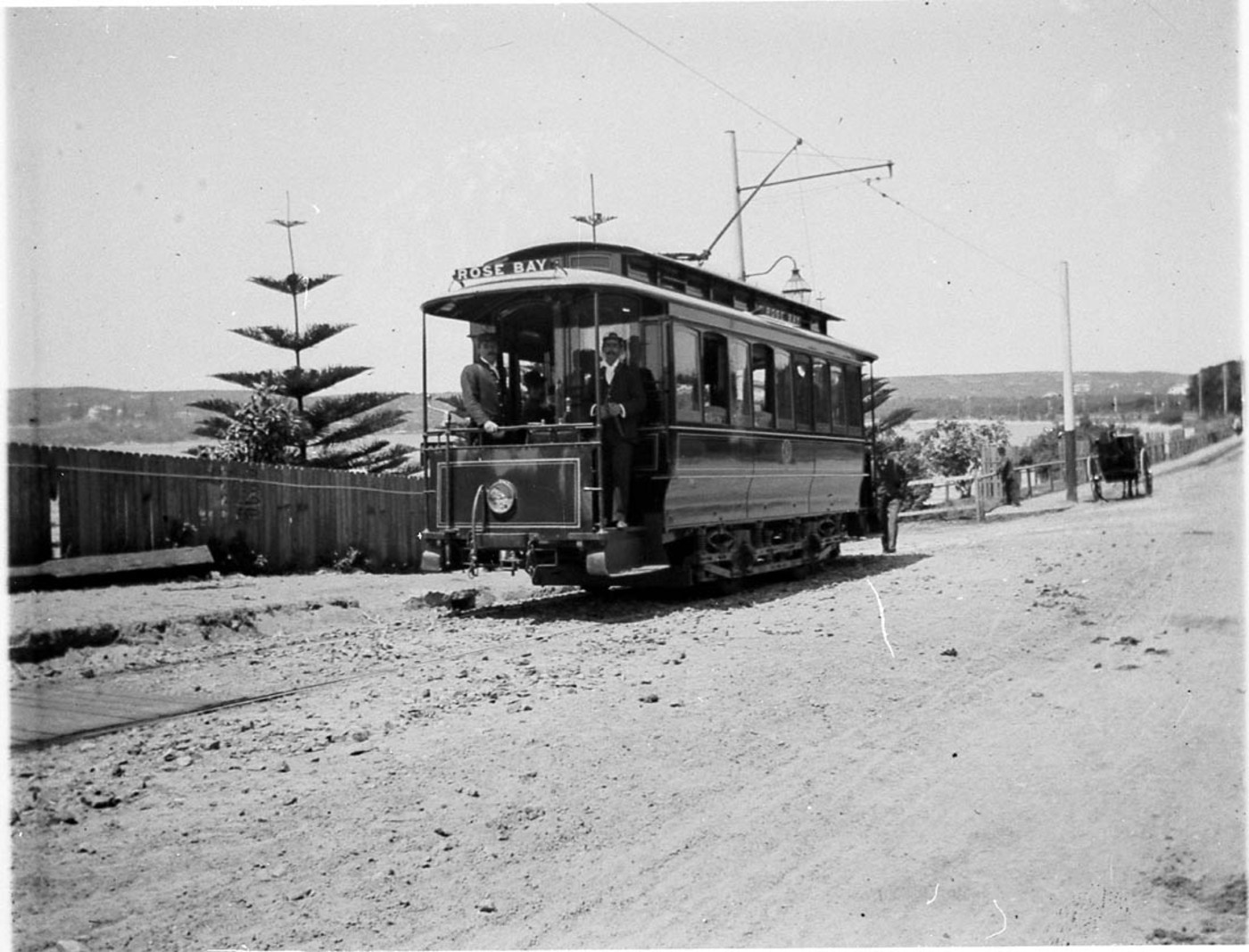
The Rose Bay electric tram, New South Head Road

After 1905, the line was extended along Dover Road to the Signal Station at Vaucluse. From the signal station a single track passed through the parkland area known as "The Gap" through narrow rock cuttings, low cliffs and rugged back-drops, twisting and turning its way down to the terminus at Watsons Bay.

The line reached Edgecliff in 1894, and Watsons Bay in 1909. In 1949 the line from Rose Bay to Watsons Bay closed, but reopened in 1950 due to public protest. This then led to policy being adopted that when a line was closed, infrastructure such as overhead wires and tracks had to be removed within 24 hours after the last tram to prevent services being reinstated.

In 1950, the line down King Street to Erskine Street closed and a new terminus constructed at Queens Square. The remainder of the line closed in July 1960. This line had its own depot and city terminus and operated independently, although was connected to the main system. The tram line followed the present-day Transdev John Holland route 324,

=== Woolloomooloo line ===
This line branched off from Park Street near College Street and ran north along Haig Avenue, Lincoln Crescent (renamed Sir John Young Crescent), Cowper Street, Forbes Street, Challis Steps Woolloomooloo. Through service ran from Circular Quay via Elizabeth and Park Street. The line opened in stages between 1915 and 1918.

The last extension of the line in 1918 was constructed during the First World War to assist in troop movements to and from overseas battle. C-Class trams 31 and 44 were specially fitted with stretcher bearers to assist with the troop movements and were used on this extension.

The line was an early closure when on 28 January 1935, the line was replaced by a bus service from Pyrmont which avoided the previous line through the city.

=== North Bondi via Bondi Junction and Bondi Beach line ===
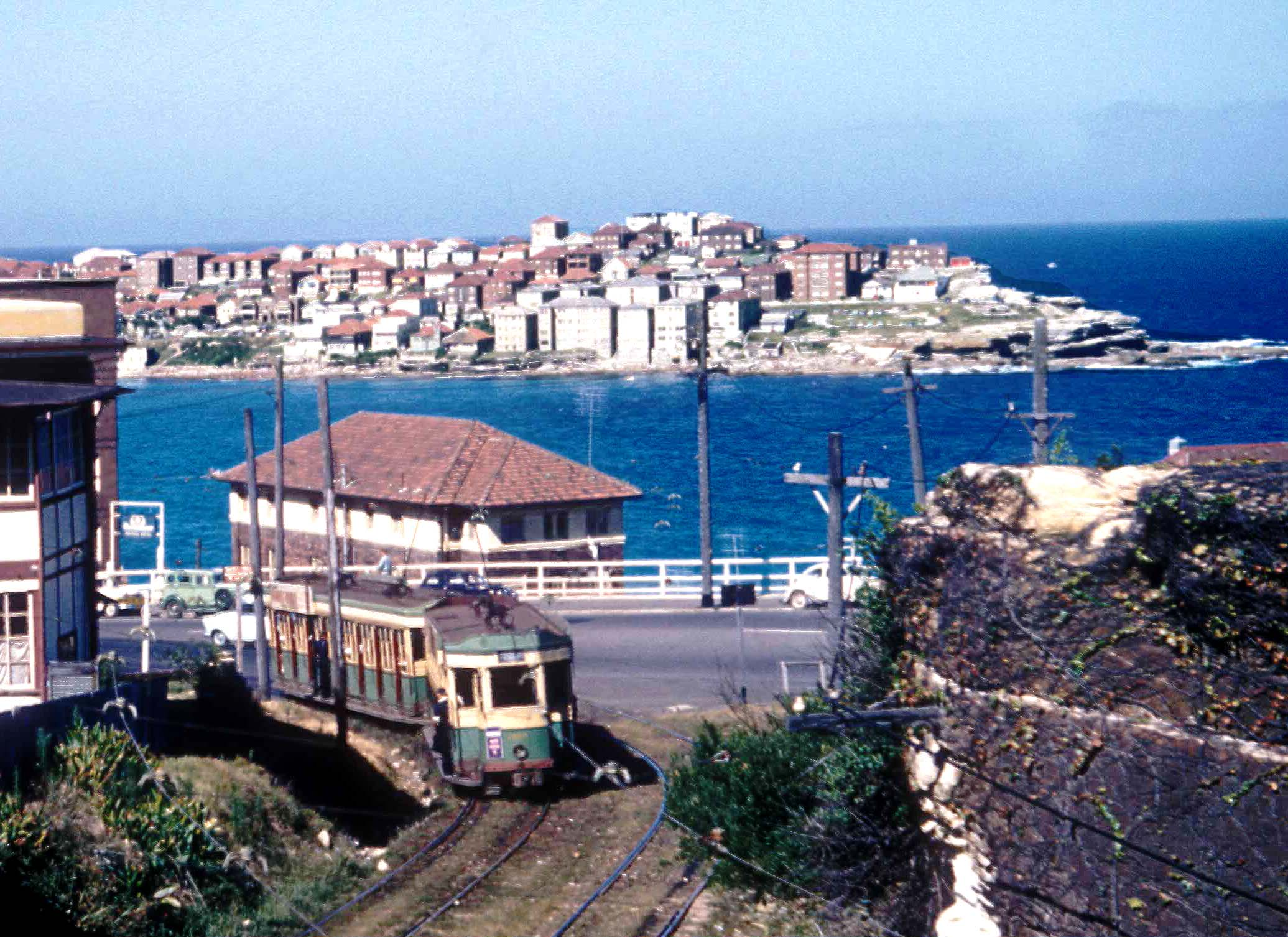
Bondi Beach, with coupled set of "P" type trams in the cutting, now the trams are gone and the cutting too. 7th Feb 1960

Services operated from either Circular Quay (via Bridge and Elizabeth Streets) or Railway Square (via Elizabeth and Liverpool Streets), to Oxford Street. The line then passed down Oxford Street to Bondi Junction, where it branched off from Bronte services, to run down Bondi Road to Fletcher Street, Campbell Parade and then to the North Bondi tram terminus.

A feature of this line was the large three track terminus cut into a hillside at North Bondi, which opened in 1946. The line opened in 1884 as a steam tramway to Bondi, then to Bondi Beach in 1894, and to North Bondi in 1929. Electric services commenced in 1902. The line closed in the early hours of 28 February 1960. The tram line followed the current route of bus route 333 as far as North Bondi.

=== North Bondi via Paddington and Bellevue Hill line ===
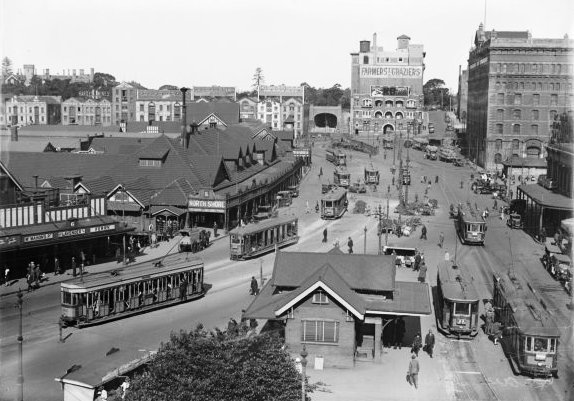
Circular Quay early 1920s. E, O and P class trams can be seen. The trams on the left were for the Western Suburbs via George Street, while trams on the right were for the Eastern Suburbs via Elizabeth Street.

Heading south down Elizabeth Street from Circular Quay, the line turned left into Park Street, then wound through East Sydney via a right turn into Yurong Street, a left turn into Stanley Street, a right turn into Bourke Street, then a left turn into Burton Street.

A spur line existed linking Burton Street to the prisoners' entrance on Forbes Street at the rear of the Darlinghurst Courthouse. This was to allow prisoners to be transferred from Long Bay Gaol or elsewhere by tram to Darlinghurst Courthouse. Tram 948 was especially built on a N class frame for this purpose and survives at the Sydney Tramway Museum.

A feature was the tram only viaduct over Barcom Avenue and Boundary Street in Darlinghurst as the line headed into MacDonald Street. This viaduct is now a road bridge.

The line then twisted down Glenmore, Gurner and Hargrave Streets in Paddington, then Moncur and Queen Streets in Woollahra. Here, a connection to Oxford Street allowed access to Waverley Tram Depot.

The line then travelled down Edgecliff and Victoria Roads, then wound along Birriga Road in Bellevue Hill, finally running down Curlewis Street in Bondi to join the Bondi Beach via Bondi Junction line on Campbell Parade, to the North Bondi terminus.

The line was double track throughout with numerous points to allow short working. Services operated from Circular Quay via Elizabeth Street and Park Street. The line opened to Bellevue Hill in 1909, and to Bondi Beach in 1914. The line was cut back to Ocean Street, Woollahra in 1955; the remainder closed on 27 June 1959. The line followed approximately the current route of Transit Systems route 389 between the city and Woollahra and route X84 between Woollahra and Bondi Beach.

=== Bronte line ===
This line branched from the North Bondi via Bondi Junction line at Bondi Junction, running down Bronte Road and MacPherson Street to Bronte Beach. A feature of this line was the final approach to Bronte Beach in a rock cutting parallel to the Pacific Ocean.

The line opened to Waverley in 1890, then to Bronte in 1911. Electric services started to Waverley in 1902, then Bronte in 1911. Through services ran from Circular Quay or Railway Square. The line was closed in the early hours of 28 February 1960, the same day as the Bondi via Oxford Street line, and replaced by a bus service, with Bondi Junction route 379 following the route.

=== Clovelly line ===
The line branched from the line to Coogee at Darley Road in Randwick. It ran north along Darley Road, then turned right into Clovelly Road to run down to its terminus at Clovelly Beach.

The line opened from Darley Road to the intersection of Clovelly and Carrington Roads in 1912, then to Clovelly in 1913. Though services ran from Circular Quay and from Railway Square (from 1923). The line closed on 27 September 1957 in conjunction with the closure of the Pitt and Castlereagh street lines on the same day as the Clovelly trams used these streets in the city. The tram line followed the current route of Transdev John Holland route 339.

=== Coogee line ===
This line branched from Anzac Parade at Alison Road, and ran on its own tram reservation beside Centennial Park as far as Darley Road.

It then ran, first alongside, then later along King Street beside the Randwick Tramway Workshops, then ran in its own reservation to Belmore Road.

It then ran down Perouse Road, St Pauls Street, Carr Street and Arden Street before terminating in a balloon loop in Dolphin Street, Coogee Beach.

It ran through several small tram reservations on its way down from Randwick to the beach. The line from the city to Randwick Racecourse opened in 1880, the first suburban extension of the system.

It was extended to High Street, Randwick in 1881 (in which year the Randwick Tramway Workshops also opened) and to Coogee in 1883, and electric services were introduced in 1902.

The line closed in October 1960. It follows the current route of Transdev John Holland route 373.

=== La Perouse line ===
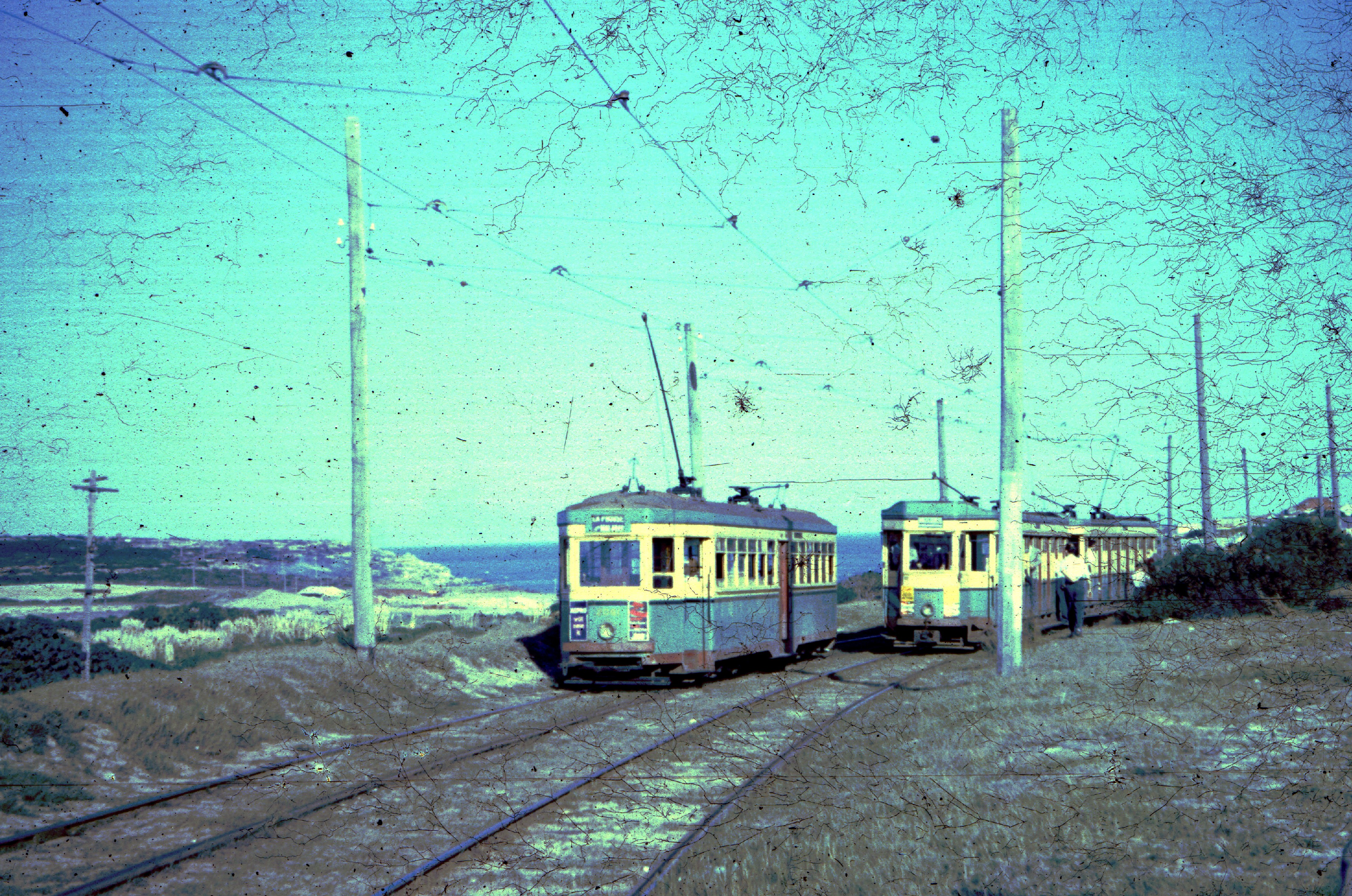
R1 Car passes P cars on the Anzac Parade, LaPerouse line, 16 April 1960.

The La Perouse line was the second longest of the Sydney system (when at maximum extent) and was the last line (along with the Maroubra line) to close.

This line branched from Oxford Street at Taylor Square in Darlinghurst to run south along Flinders Street, then onto its own tram reservation along the eastern side of Anzac Parade beside Moore Park. The section of this line from the city as far as Alison Road began life in 1880 as the first suburban extension to Randwick (see Coogee Line). It contained what was probably the world's first use of a balloon loop for tramways, built in Moore Park in 1881. The Sydney system made extensive use of loops.

From Alison Road, the La Perouse Line proceeded down the centre of Anzac Parade through Maroubra Junction, and Malabar to its balloon loop terminus at La Perouse. At Malabar, a single line branched off to serve Long Bay Gaol. The line was double track throughout.

The line was built in stages from 1900 to 1902. It was the final line to close on 25 February 1961. The line followed the current route of Transdev John Holland route 394.

=== Maroubra line ===
This line branched off the line to La Perouse at the intersection of Anzac Parade and Maroubra Road, travelling east along Maroubra Road, Cooper Street (now Mons Avenue), French Street and Mons Avenue before terminating in a balloon loop in Marine Parade, Maroubra Beach.

The line was double track throughout and passed through several tram reservations on its descent down to the beach. Direct services operated from Circular Quay and Railway Square.

The line opened from Anzac Parade to Maroubra Beach in 1921 and was the second last line to close on 25 February 1961 (followed by the La Perouse line). The line followed the current route of Transdev John Holland route 397.

=== Cross-country line (Bondi Junction to Coogee) ===
This line branched off Bronte Road at Waverley and travelled south down Albion Street and Frenchmans Road, then via Frances and Cook Streets to join the Coogee line at Belmore Road in Randwick, at the location then known as Randwick Junction. The old route between Cowper St and Frances St progressed through what are now the grounds of Randwick Public School.

The line was single track throughout, with a passing loop on Frenchmans Road. Initially, services ran from the junction at Albion Street in Wavelery to Randwick only, this was later extended to Coogee in 1907.

From 1910, through services operated from Bondi Beach to Coogee Beach, and later additionally from Waverley Tram Depot to Coogee Beach.

The line opened as a steam tramway in 1887, and was electrified in 1902. It closed in 1954, replaced by bus route 314.

=== West Kensington via Surry Hills line ===
This line branched from the tramlines in Oxford Street and ran down Crown Street to Cleveland Street in Surry Hills, then south along Baptist Street to Phillip Street, where it swung left into Crescent Street before running south along Dowling Street.

It passed the Dowling Street Tram Depot, then turned left into Todman Avenue where it terminated at West Kensington. Services operated full-time from Circular Quay, and to Railway Square in peak hours.

The line opened in 1881 down Crown Street as far as Cleveland Street as a steam tramway.

It was extended to Phillip Street in 1909, Todman Avenue in 1912, and then to its final terminus down Todman Avenue in 1937.

The line down Crown Street closed in 1957, the remainder stayed open until 1961 to allow access to the Dowling Street Depot.

Transdev John Holland route 304 generally follow the route down Crown and Baptist Streets as far as Phillip Street.

=== Botany via Railway Square Line ===
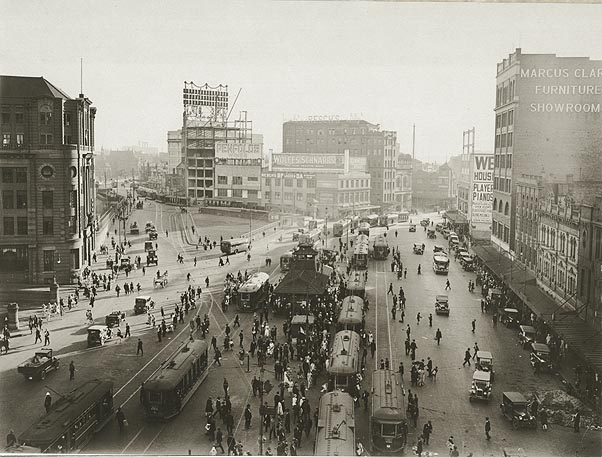
Railway Square tram interchange circa 1930. L, N and O Class trams can be seen. The waiting shed in this photo has been preserved by the Sydney Tramway Museum

Services operated from Circular Quay initially via Elizabeth, Chalmers and Redfern streets (from 1902), then in 1933 via Pitt and Castlereagh Streets, and Eddy Avenue, Lee and Regent Streets, to Botany Street in Waterloo.

A single-track connection along Bourke and O'Dea Streets joined at the present day Green Square, allowing access to the Dowling Street Tram Depot.

The line then passed down the entire length of Botany Road to Botany. In Mascot, a branch led to the former Ascot Racecourse at the site of Sydney Airport.

Points were provided at Bay Street on Botany Road in Botany for short working. The line was double track throughout.

From Botany, a single-track line crossed the Botany Goods railway at Beauchamp Road, then passed along Perry Street and Bunnerong Road, past the former Bunnerong Power Station to join the La Perouse line at Yarra Junction. Generally a shuttle service operated on this single track section between Botany and La Perouse.

This single-track line was cut back to Military Road in 1935. The line opened in 1882 as a steam tramway to Botany, and electric services commenced in 1903.

The line from the junctions at Cleveland Street to Botany closed in 1960. Transdev John Holland route 309 generally follows the route.

=== Alexandria line ===
This line branched from the Botany line at the junction of Henderson and Botany Roads in Alexandria.

The line proceeded down Erskineville Oval for short working. The line turned right into the present day Sydney Park Road (then known as an extension of Mitchell Road) before terminating at the junction with the Cook's River line at the Princes Highway near St Peters railway station.

Services operated from Circular Quay in a route similar to the Botany line as far as the Henderson Road junction.

The line opened in 1902 as a single-track electric line, duplicated in 1910. It was closed in 1959. Transit Systems route 308 generally follows the route as far as St Peters station.

=== Henderson Road (Erskineville) line ===
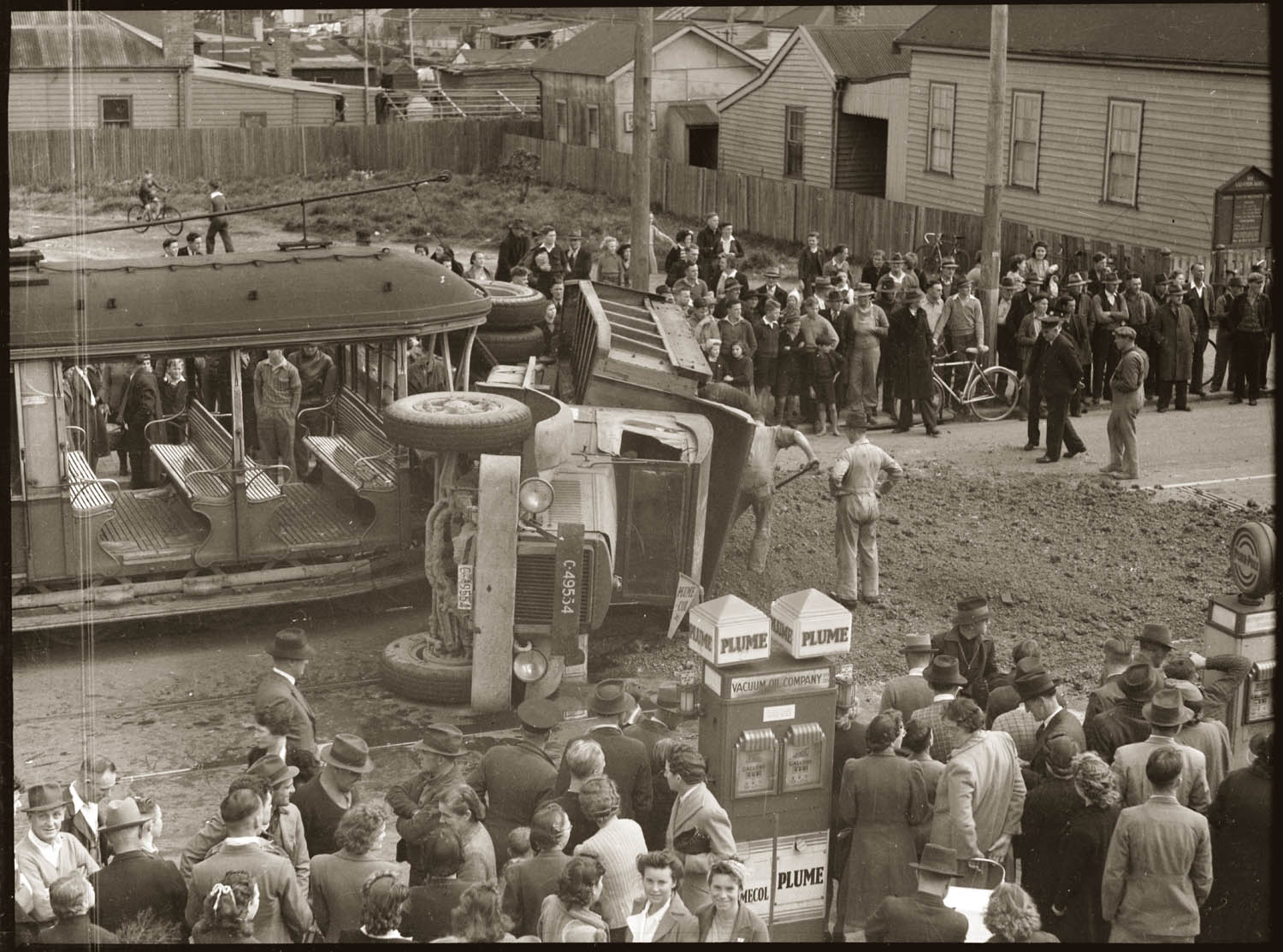
A collision between a truck and an O-class tram on Botany Road, Mascot. The petrol pump and women's fashions suggest the early-mid 1940s

This short line branched from the Alexandria line tracks at the corner of Henderson and Mitchell Roads in Alexandria and passed along Henderson Road to Park Street in Erskineville, and later to Bridge Street adjacent to Erskineville railway station. Services operated from Circular Quay.

The line was an electrified single track throughout. The line opened to Park Street in 1906 and to Bridge Street in 1909. The line was an early closure, in 1933. It was replaced by a private bus service that no longer operates.

=== Rosebery line ===
This line opened in 1902 initially via Chalmers and Redfern streets and south along Elizabeth Street to Zetland. In 1924, the line was extended to Epsom Road in Rosebery.

In 1948, to facilitate construction of the Eastern Suburbs railway line, a new line was constructed down Elizabeth Street between Devonshire Street and Redfern Street and the route was deviated to run down this new section.

The line was electrified double track throughout. The line was closed in 1957.

=== Daceyville line ===
This line branched from the Botany Road line at Gardners Road, and passed east along Gardners Road to join the lines at Anzac Parade at what was known as Daceyville Junction. It included a large collection of sidings at the former Rosebery Racecourse, now the site of The Lakes Golf Course. The full line opened in 1913, with services from Circular Quay via Waterloo. Some services were extended to Maroubra Beach via the Anzac Parade lines. The line closed in 1957.

== Western lines ==
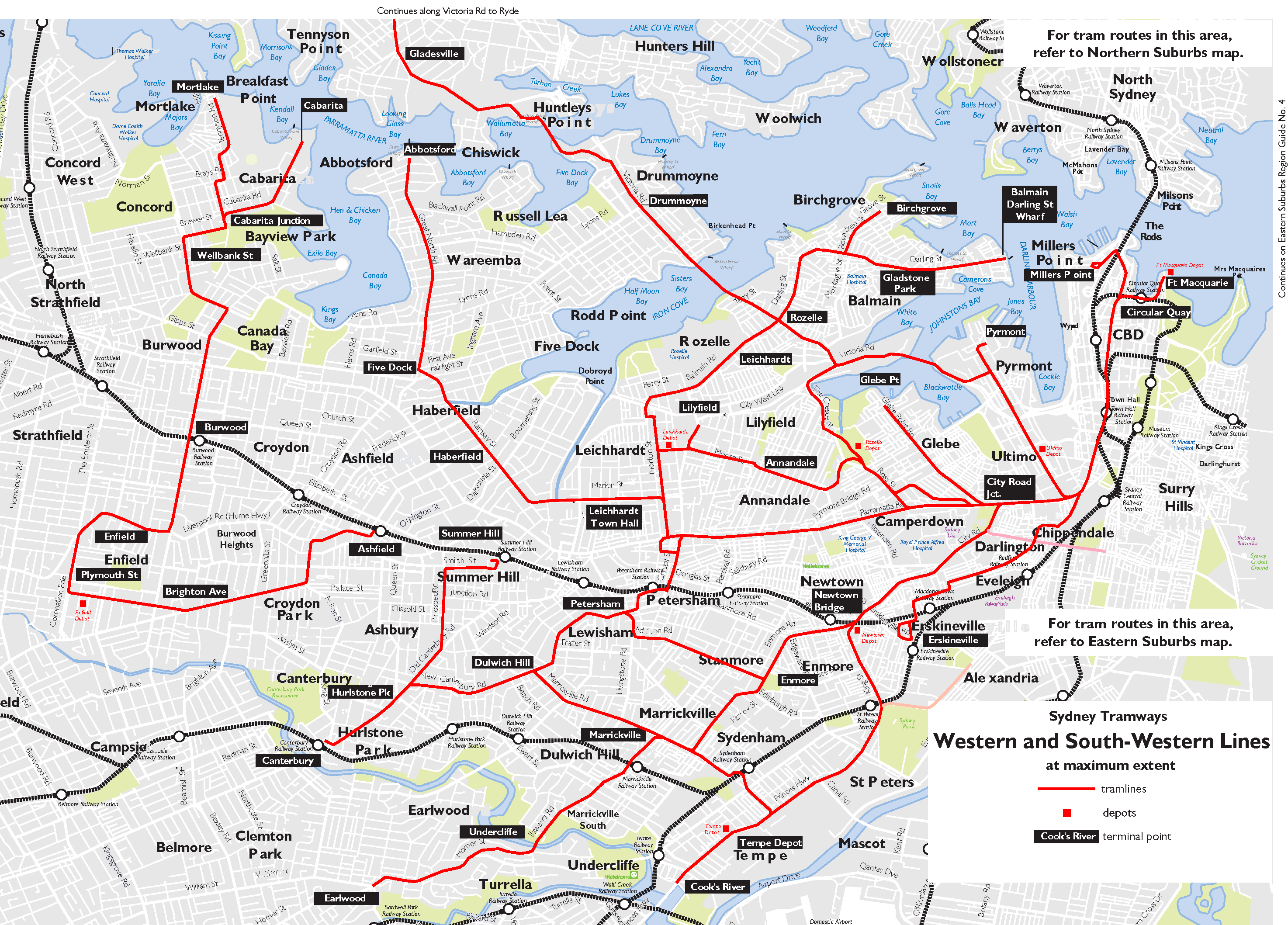
A map of the South-western and western lines

The Western lines, also known as "the red lines" after the colour of the destination symbols and "the George Street lines" (as they ran down George Street to Circular Quay), originated the majority of services from Fort Macquarie and Circular Quay down George Street to various destinations. In the peak hours and other busy periods, supplementary services operated from Railway Square.

The 1920s were a boom period, with up to 200 trams in use on lines to Leichhardt, Drummoyne, Ryde, Abbotsford, Glebe and Balmain. The tram lines to Glebe Point, Balmain (Gladstone Park), Lilyfield, Leichhardt and Haberfield were closed in November 1958.

=== Abbotsford via Leichhardt and Five Dock ===
Trams to Abbotsford via Leichhardt and Five Dock left the city via Parramatta Road and Norton Street. Trams to Leichhardt then continued down Norton Street to the original terminus at Darley Road Leichardt.

The Abbotsford line branched off the Leichhardt line at Marion Street, Leichhardt opposite the Leichardt Town Hall. The line followed Marion Street, Ramsay Street, Haberfield, and then turned right onto Great North Road, travelling through Five Dock and Abbotsford before terminating near The Terrace, connecting with ferry services at Abbotsford wharf.

The line was closed between Five Dock and Abbotsford in 1954, Haberfield and Five Dock in 1956, and closed from Leichardt to Haberfield in 1958 with the closure of the "George Street lines".

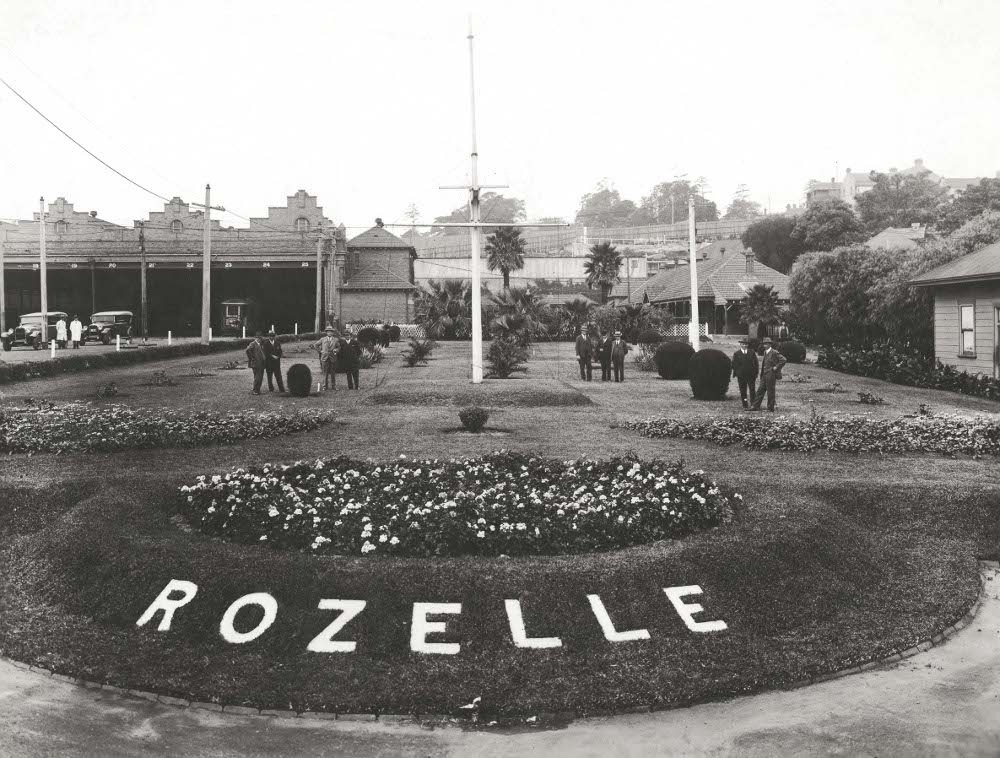
Rozelle Tram Depot, 1919. Upon closure of the Ultimo Tram Depot on 27 June 1953 the Rozelle received additional trams to run the Darling Street wharf to Canterbury route

=== Lilyfield ===
The Lilyfield line branched off the Balmain line at Epping Junction (adjacent to Harold Park Paceway and the Rozelle Tram Depot) and then went via reserved track to Taylor Street and then right into Booth Street, Annandale. The tram line turned right into Catherine Street and terminated at the intersection of Abattoir Road and Grove Street, on the bridge over the railway goods yard. This was the only tram terminus in Sydney located on a bridge. The Lilyfield line was closed in November 1958.

The current stop of the Inner West Light Rail, numbered L1 and also known as the Inner West Light Rail, of Lilyfield is located underneath the bridge of the former terminus.

=== Balmain ===
The first steam tram to service Darling Street was in 1892. Ten years later the service was electrified. Services left the CBD via George Street and ran via George Street West (Now Broadway), Catherine Street, St Johns Road, Ross Street, in reservation to Crescent Street (now part of The Crescent). The line then crossed Johnstone Creek on a dedicated bridge before being on its own reservation where it rejoined street running along The Crescent. The line then traveled Commercial Road to Barnes Street and then Weston Road. The line turned into Darling Street to the terminus at Darling Street Wharf.

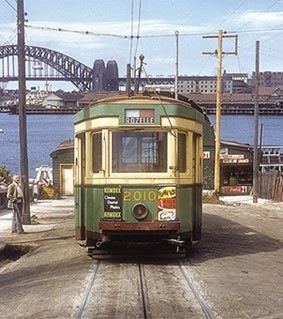
A R1 2010 at Darling Street wharf.

A feature of this line was a counterweight dummy system that controlled and assisted trams on a steep single-line section of track near the terminus at Darling Street wharf. Due to the very steep incline at the bottom of the street, the trams used a complex 'dummy' / counterweight system constructed under the road surface. A 4-wheel 'dummy' car sat on the single-track at the top of the hill, connected via a large sheave under the track to the counterweight running on a narrow-gauge track in a tunnel under the road.

A tram destined for the wharf would close-up to the dummy and push it down the steep hill (gradient 1 in 8), thus raising the counterweight and being assisted in braking. The tram was then assisted up the hill by the weight of the descending counterweight via the dummy. The dummy is behind car 2010 in the photograph at right, and is on display at the Sydney Tramway Museum. The slot through which the dummy was fixed to the cable can be seen in that photograph.

Circular Quay to Balmain tram services terminated at Gladstone Park for most of the life of the system. Darling Street wharf was the terminus for the cross suburban route to Canterbury. The Canterbury to Darling Street wharf service ceased in 1954. Until 1955, City to Balmain services continued to the wharf, when buses replaced trams between Gladstone Park and the wharf. Balmain services were closed with other western line services in November 1958. Transit Systems route 442 has since replaced the tram route.

=== Birchgrove ===
Services branched off from the mainline on Darling Street, turning left into Rowntree Street, then another left into Cameron Street, before turning right into Grove Street and terminating at Wharf Road, Birchgrove. This route follows the contemporary 441 bus route. Service to Birchgrove was terminated in 1954.

=== Glebe Point ===
This line travelling from the city branched off onto Glebe Point Road from Parramatta Road, terminating near the corner of Pendrill Street.

=== Ryde and Drummoyne ===
The line to West Ryde railway station was the longest line of the Sydney system. When cut back to Drummoyne the La Perouse line took over the title.

Ryde services ran the full length of George Street and turned into Harris Street just after Railway Square following the same route as today's Busways operated route 501 bus service. Trams went along Harris Street and crossed the Glebe Island Bridge. From White Bay junction until the Darling Street junction, Ryde trams shared tracks in Victoria Road with the Balmain and Birchgrove lines. The tram then crossed the Iron Cove Bridge and the former Gladesville Bridge before turning right onto Blaxland Road. It then wound its way along Blaxland Road, behind the site of the now-demolished council chambers, terminating near the intersection of Pope and Devlin Street in Ryde.

There was a peak hour service to Drummoyne via Forest Lodge. At Forest Lodge the line swung right into Ross Street before entering onto its own reserved track, now known as Minogue Crescent, passing Rozelle Tram Depot. This joined the main Victoria Road Ryde line at White Bay junction.

It was initially a single line, later duplicated from Rozelle to Ryde between 1906 and 1936. The tram terminus was established at the western end of Blaxland Road, located near the current Top Ryde City shopping centre, and extended down Victoria Road through Gladesville, where it eventually terminated at Fort Macquarie (present site of the Sydney Opera House). The entire trip took approximately 61 minutes to complete, and was the single longest route on the Sydney tram network, measuring 10 miles 61 chains (17.3 km) via Pyrmont.

In 1914 a single tram line was added between Ryde Post Office (corner of Church Street and Parkes Street) and West Ryde railway station. The Sydney to Ryde service became very popular, particularly at weekends when Sydney residents would travel to the orchards of the Ryde District to buy produce.

The tram service from Ryde to the city was cut back to Drummoyne on 19 December 1949 and replaced by buses. The service to Drummoyne was terminated in 1953.

=== Balmain via Pyrmont ===
Services commenced at Railway Square, travelling south-west on Broadway, turning right onto Harris Street, passing the former Darling Harbour goods yard. At Pyrmont a separate line branched off from the main line on Harris Street, turning left into Miller Street, turning right into Bank Street, crossing the former Glebe Island Bridge. It then travelled along Commercial Road turning right onto Victoria Road, then right onto Darling Street, terminating at the Darling Street wharf.

=== Annandale and Forest Lodge ===
Lines ran along Booth Street, Parramatta Road, Ross Street, St Johns Road, Mt Vernon Street and Catherine Street, as well as Taylor Street. Current Transit Systems route 470 follows this tramline.

== South-western lines ==
The south-western group of lines, also known as the Green lines after the colour of the destination symbols, used the Pitt Street - Castlereagh Street anticlockwise loop from Circular Quay. After passing through Railway Square, trams reached Newtown after branching off Broadway at City Road in Camperdown, and passed along King Street to Newtown station.

Four lines went to Cooks River, Dulwich Hill, Canterbury and Earlwood. A short-lived line also operated between Canterbury and Summer Hill. Most of these lines were closed on 27 September 1957, in conjunction with the closure of the Pitt and Castlereagh lines through the CBD on the same day.

=== Cooks River line ===
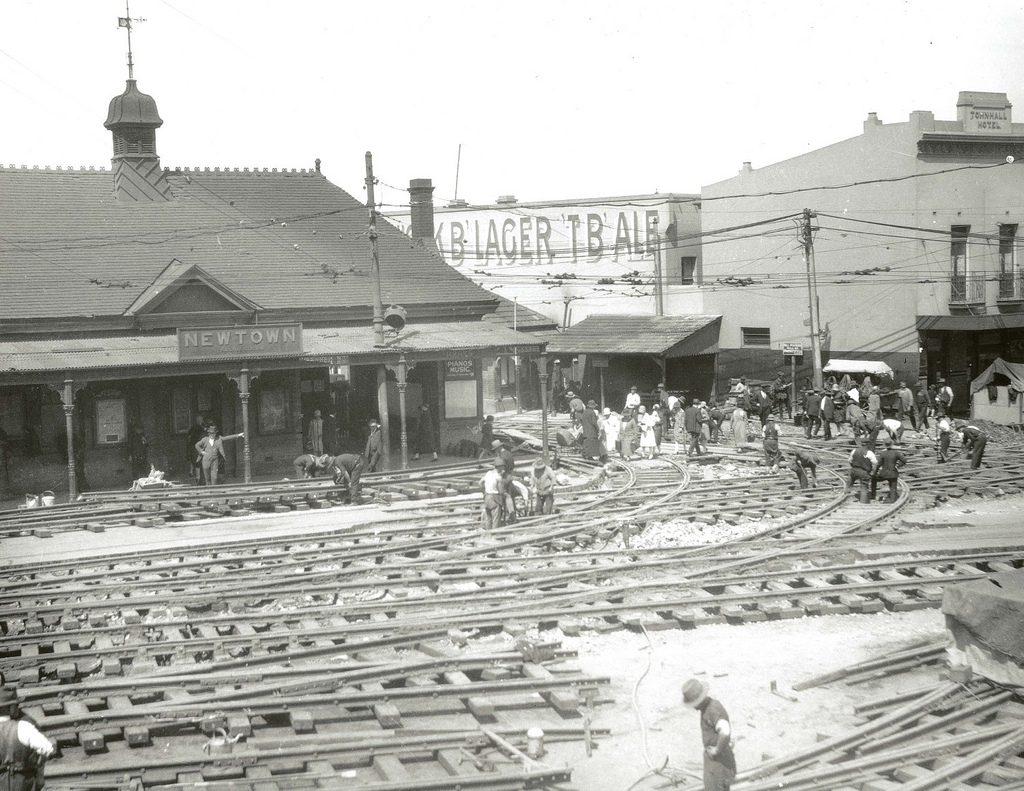
Re-laying tracks outside Newtown Tram Depot in 1927

This line ran south-west along City Road from Broadway, then along King Street, Newtown, past Newtown and St Peters railway stations to the Princes Highway.

It then proceeded down the Princes Highway to its terminus at the Cooks River. At Tempe, a connection lead to the Tempe Tram Depot, on the corner of the Princes Highway and Gannon Street.

Past the terminus at the Cooks River, a single line led over the river to the Wolli Creek Perway Yard. The line reached St Peters as a steam tramway in 1891, then to Cooks River in 1900 when electric services commenced.

The line closed on 27 September 1957 with today's Transit Systems route 422 parallelling the former line, with occasional extensions to Kogarah.

=== Dulwich Hill line ===
This line branched from the line to Cooks River at Newtown, and travelled down Enmore Road through Enmore, then along Victoria Road to Marrickville Road before tuning right along Marrickville Road through Marrickville and Dulwich Hill to New Canterbury Road. At the New Canterbury Road terminus, a tram turning loop was provided, this is currently used as a layover area for buses. Current Transit Systems Sydney route 426 follows this tramline. The line closed on 27 September 1957.

=== Canterbury line ===
This line branched from the line to Dulwich Hill on Enmore Road into Addison Road, before turning right into Livingstone Road and then left onto New Canterbury Road in Petersham. The line then travelled down New Canterbury Road through Dulwich Hill and Hurlstone Park to a terminus adjacent to Canterbury railway station in Broughton Street. Transit Systems Sydney route 428 follows the route of this line.

=== Earlwood line ===
This line branched from the line to Dulwich Hill on Marrickville Road into Illawarra Road, travelling south-west and crossing the Cooks River, followed by a steep ascent up Homer Street to the Earlwood shopping district. The line terminated in Homer Street at the intersection of William Street and Hartill Law Avenue. Transit Systems Sydney route 423 follows the former tram line, although this bus route now extends to Kingsgrove. The line closed on 27 September 1957, along with all the 'Green line' tram lines.

=== Erskineville line ===
This line branched from tracks at Regent Street in Chippendale, and passed west along Meagher Street, then south into Abercrombie Street, across the junction with Cleveland Street through Golden Grove, before swinging south into Golden Grove Street then right into Wilson Street.

The line then passed under the railway lines at Burren Street, adjacent to the entrance to Macdonaldtown station.

The line then became a single track loop passing up Burren Street to Erskineville Road, then west to Septimus Street, then Albert Street before rejoining the tracks at Burren Street. Services operated from Circular Quay using the Pitt and Castlereagh Street lines.

The line opened as an electric double track tramway in 1909. The line south of Cleveland Street closed in 1940, with the northern section used by other services until its closure in 1958.

=== Cross-country lines ===
==== Darling Street wharf to Canterbury line ====
A cross-country connection between the Canterbury line at New Canterbury Road to Petersham and the Western Suburbs lines on Parramatta Road allowed a cross-country service to operate between Canterbury and Balmain. From Crystal Street, Fort Street (single-line loops), Parramatta Road, this route continued via Norton Street, Leichhardt to Balmain Road, Rozelle where it crossed Victoria Road to Darling Street wharf. It now forms the basis of Transit Systems route 445.

==== Cooks River to Dulwich Hill line ====
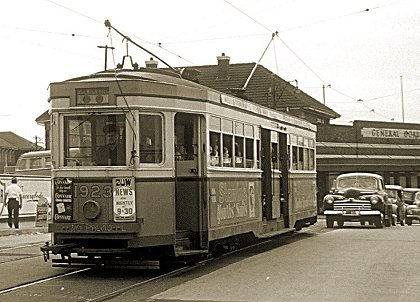
R1923 at Sydenham station in November 1954

A cross-country line connected the Cooks River and Dulwich Hill lines via Sydenham, operating along Railway Road and Sydenham Road in Sydenham. A cross-country service operated between Cooks River and Dulwich Hill. Transit Systems Sydney route 425 follows this route, but now terminates 400m up the road at Tempe Depot. The line closed on 27 September 1957.

==== Hurlstone Park to Summer Hill line ====
A short-lived single track cross-country line operated from the Canterbury line at Hurlstone Park along Old Canterbury Road and Prospect Road to Summer Hill railway station. Services operated between Canterbury and Summer Hill from 1915. Low patronage and competition from motor buses saw the line close in 1933. The disused track and overhead remained in place until the 1950s. This line was in use in the early 1950s. There were double tracks opposite Trinity Grammar School in Prospect Road.

== Enfield lines ==
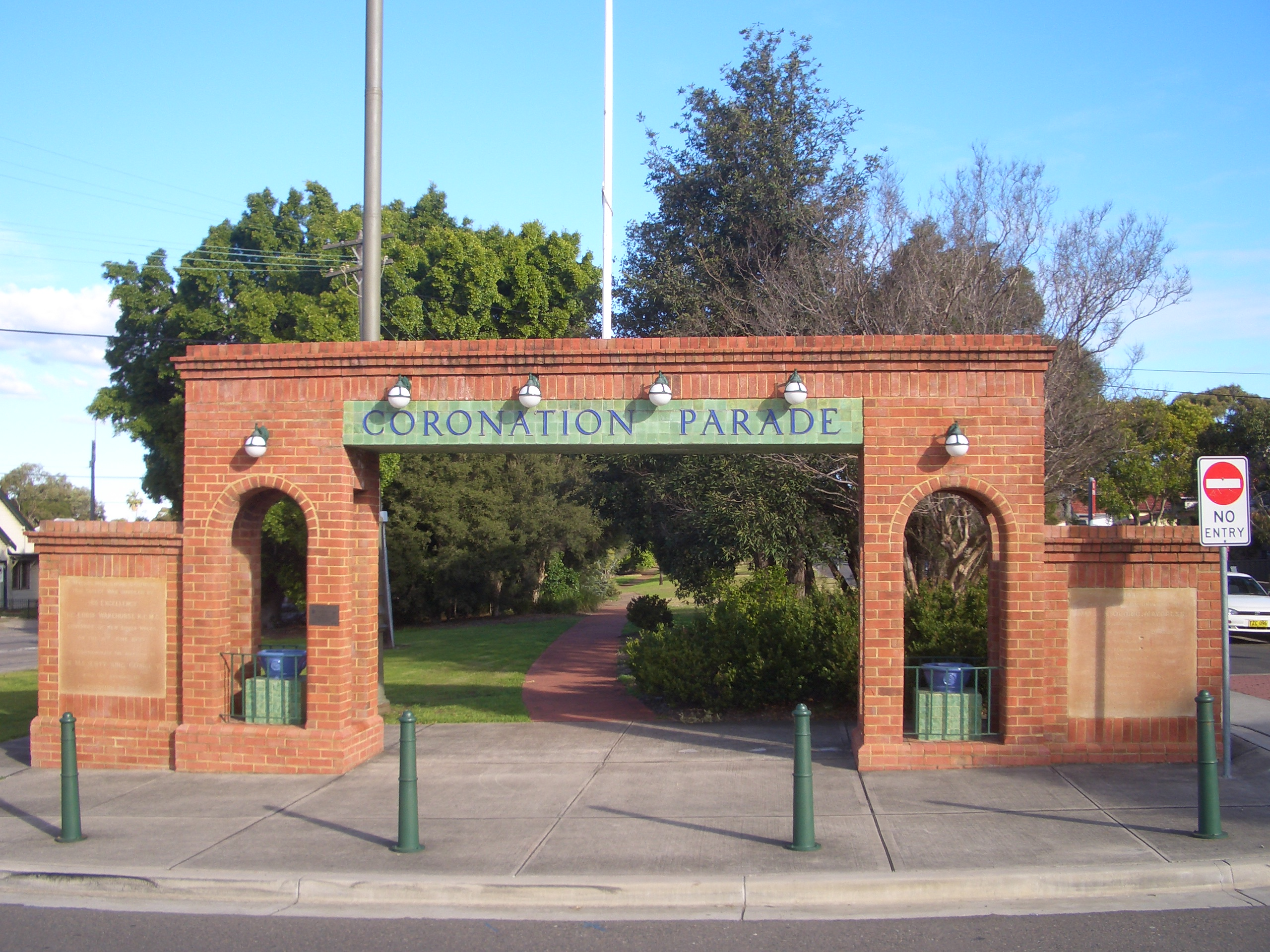
The Coronation Parade arch displays 4 light bulbs which were originally the holders for the four electricity cables that ran along the former tram line

The Enfield line was a single line with a spur line, based around a depot located in present-day Croydon Park, in Sydney's Inner West. The location of the depot was, at the time, part of the suburb of Enfield. Although located close to the other Western lines (its eastern terminus, at Ashfield Station, was only one station away from the Summer Hill Station terminus of the Hurlstone Park to Summer Hill line), it was never connected to the other tram lines, and so formed its own system.

The system began as a steam tramway opening in 1891 between Ashfield station and Enfield. In 1901, this line was extended north through Burwood to Mortlake, and in 1907 a branch to Cabarita Park was opened.

The system was electrified in 1912. Services operated from Ashfield station along Liverpool Road, then Georges River Road, onto a reserved corridor that swung off Georges River Road at a point roughly opposite Windsor Avenue. From this point the corridor ran diagonally towards, then across Burwood Road and onto what is now Tangarra Street East.

The reserved corridor ended at Portland Street, at which point the line continued west along the length of Tangarra Street, then north along what is now Coronation Reserve (the two roadways running alongside the reserve, now both called Coronation Parade, were originally parallel streets called The Boulevarde (east) and Punchbowl Road (west)) to the junction with Liverpool Road, at the junction of the present-day suburbs of Enfield, Strathfield South, Strathfield and Burwood.

From this junction, the tram line back to Liverpool Road heading east through Enfield, and then north along Burwood Road through Burwood. The line then turned into Crane Street, then Majors Bay Road and Brewer Street to Cabarita Junction. The line was double track until this point, then it split into single-track branches to Mortlake via Frederick, Vanhee and Gale Streets and Tenneyson Road, and to Cabarita via Cabarita Road.

Short services were turned back at Brighton Avenue, Plymouth Street, Enfield, Burwood station and Wellbank Street. Services operated every five minutes between Ashfield and Wellbank Street in peak periods, and every 15 minutes (30 minutes at off-peak times) on the two branches.

A depot on Tangarra Street in Croydon Park, near Kembla Street and Coronation Parade, served the lines.

After electrification, services were provided predominately by O Class trams after experimentation with other classes found that they were unable to operate the timetables due to topography challenges.

The lines closed in 1948, and were replaced by buses. Tramway infrastructure was removed throughout the route in 1951. The Tangarra Street depot was used by buses until its closure in 1989. The depot was demolished to make way for housing. A small brick hut used as a waiting room for passengers still stands on the western side of the Coronation Parade reserve near Dean Street. This is one of very few surviving remnants of the line.

The reserved tramway corridor at Croydon Park is now residential property from its eastern limit starting at Georges River Road opposite Windsor Avenue and running diagonally to Burwood Road, and also from Burwood Road to Tangarra Street East (with property boundaries following the route of the corridor). Tangarra Street East, which did not exist in the days of tram operation, follows the route of the remainder of the corridor to its western limit at the intersection with Portland Street.

== Southern suburbs lines ==
The following lines were all isolated from the main system.

=== Rockdale to Brighton-Le-Sands line ===
A map ofSouthern Sydney tramways

This line opened as a private steam tramway in 1885. It was electrified in 1900, and moved into government ownership in 1914.

=== Kogarah to Sans Souci line ===
This steam tramway opened in 1887 using small railway locomotives and carriages.

In 1891 two conventional steam tram motors were built for the line by Henry Vale. Six C1 type trailers replaced the railway carriages around the same period.

The tramway operated for 50 years until it was replaced by an electric trolleybus service in 1937.

It connected with trains at Kogarah station by way of a large balloon loop through the streets, then passed south down Rocky Point Road to Sans Souci, Sandringham and Dolls Point.

Small depots at Sandringham and Kogarah serviced the line. The line was single track at each end with a double-track middle section down Rocky Point Road. Track on the line was laid to railway standards to allow railway trucks to haul goods over the line. Although laid as double track along Rocky Point Road, the trams only used the most eastern track. The western track being laid to enable electric trams to be used, however this never happened as trolleybuses took over operation.

Wilson's 1917 map shows the route leaving Kogarah Station (no loop), then Gray Street, across Kogarah Road, and thence by a ROW to Rocky Point Road, entering near Herman Street, thence along Russell Avenue, Clareville Street to the foreshore, then along the foreshore (now Cook Park) to Sans Souci/Rocky Point Road, then north along that road, rejoining the line at Russell Avenue.

=== Arncliffe to Bexley line ===
This steam tramway opened in 1908 and closed in 1926. It connected with trains at Arncliffe station, and ran down Wollongong Road, then Forest Road through Bexley before terminating at the corner of Forest and Preddys Roads, Bexley. The line was single track, with a passing loop midway. A small car shed at Arncliffe maintained the trams.

=== Sutherland to Cronulla line ===
This line opened as a steam tramway between Sutherland railway station and Cronulla's Shelley Beach, in 1911. It closed to passengers and was replaced by a bus service in 1931, and closed completely in 1932. It pre-dated the Cronulla railway line, which took over its role.

== North Shore lines ==
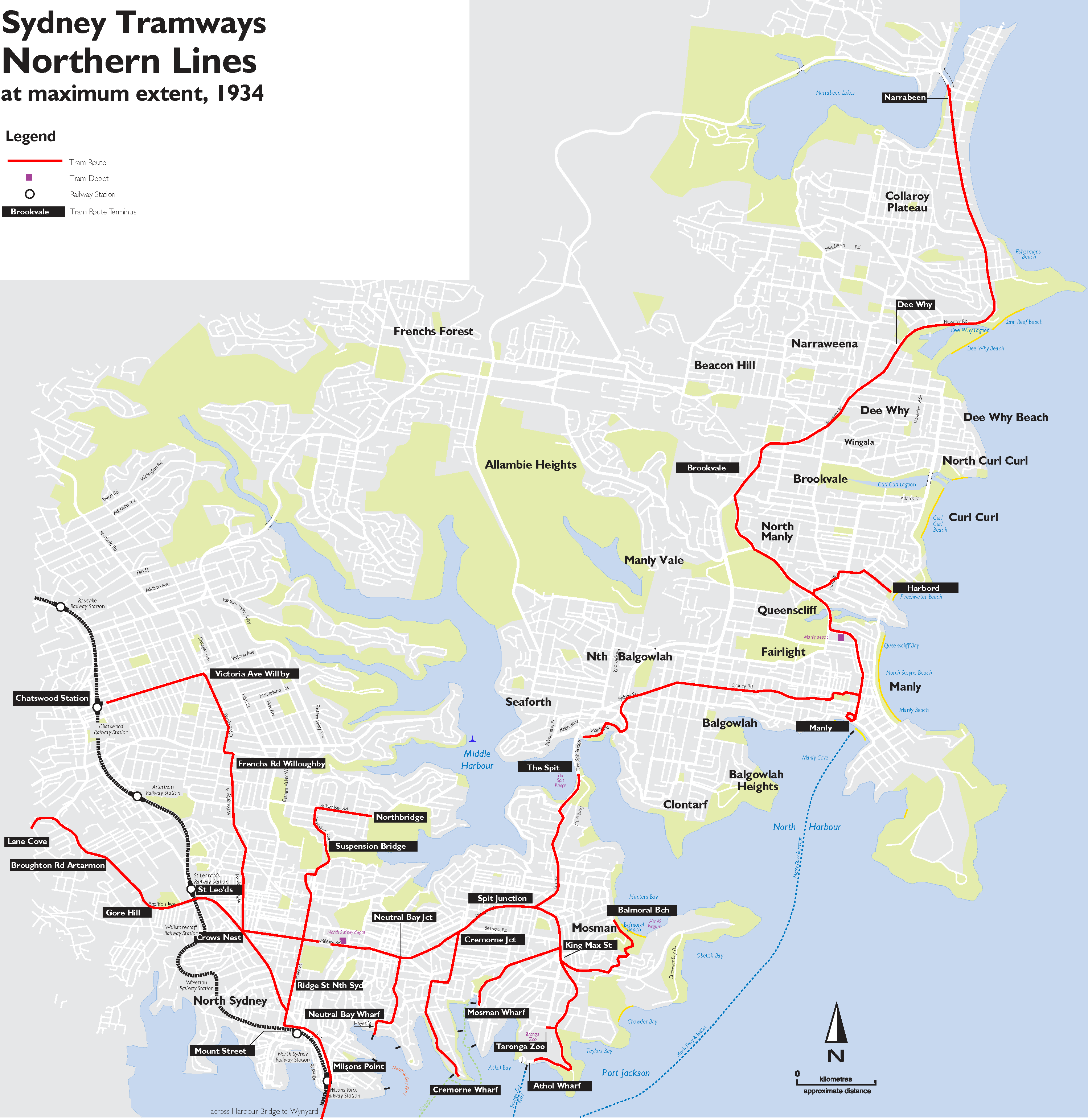
A map of the North Shore lines

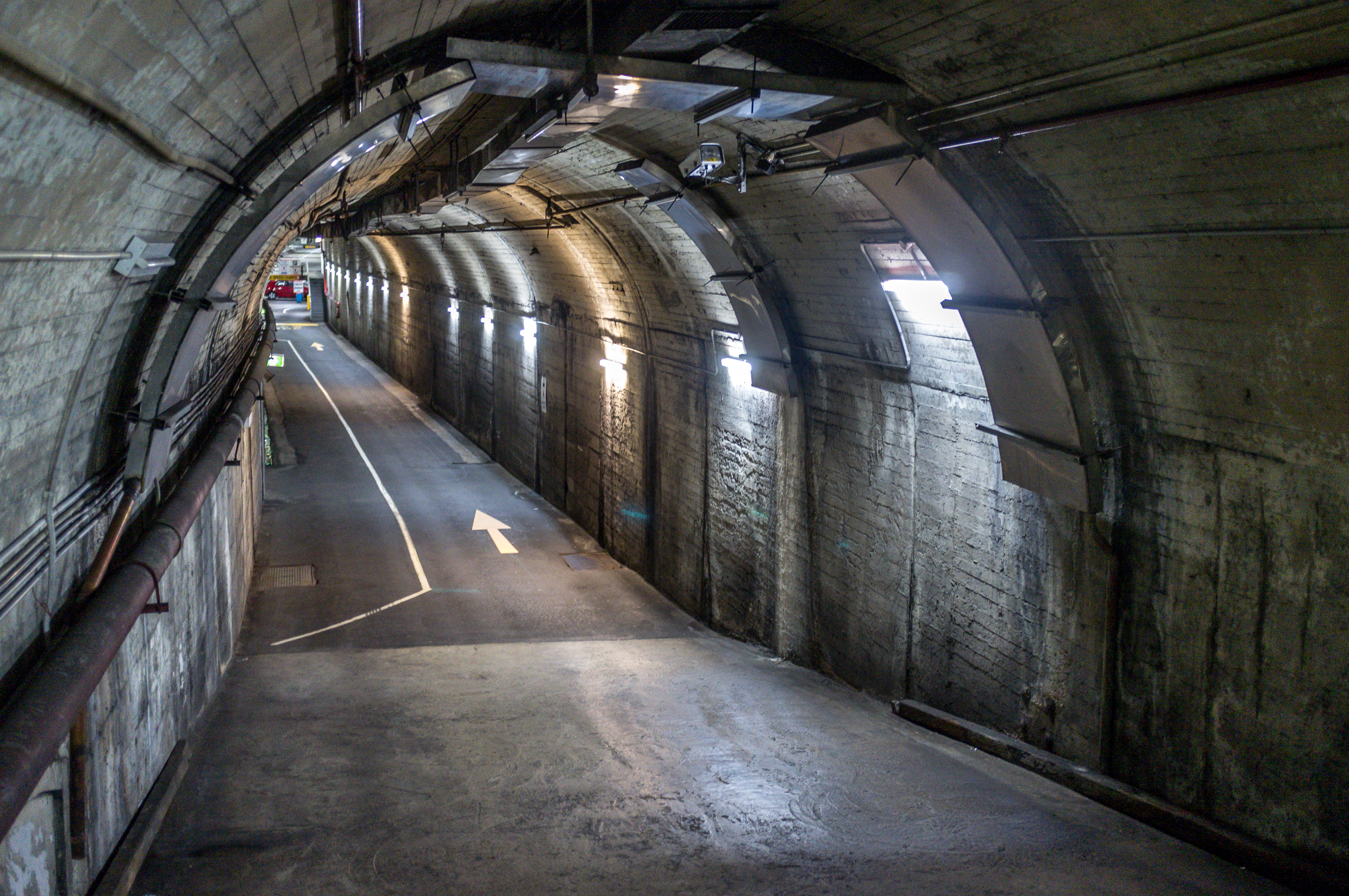
Former Tram Tunnels leading to disused Platforms 1 and 2 at Wynyard station

A feature of these lines was the underground tram terminus at Wynyard railway station (the only one in Australia), and the tracks over the Sydney Harbour Bridge. Trams ran from Blue Street, North Sydney over a now-demolished steel arch bridge over the Harbour Bridge Roadway, then over the eastern side of the harbour bridge (now used by the Cahill Expressway), through a tram platform at Milsons Point similar to the railway station on the opposite side, and dived underground into platforms 1 and 2 of Wynyard station. These platforms were converted into a car park after the tramway's closure on 28 June 1958. Wynyard station's railway platforms are thus numbered 3–6.

The line along Military Road, opened in September 1893, was the first permanent electric tramway in Sydney and New South Wales.

The first part of the North Sydney tramway system was a double-track cable tramway which started at the original Milsons Point wharf, located where the north pylon of the Harbour Bridge is now. The line originally extended via Alfred Street (now Alfred Street South), Junction Street (now Pacific Highway), Blue Street and Miller Streets to the winding engine house and depot at Ridge Street. It used cable grip cars called "dummies" and unpowered trailer cars, similar to the large Melbourne cable tramway system but quite different from the surviving lines in San Francisco, where everything is combined in a single vehicle.

The original cable line was extended via Miller and Falcon Streets to Crows Nest, and later the whole line was electrified and extensions were built to various termini around the Lower North Shore.

The history of the North Sydney tramway system can be divided into three periods – the first from the original opening in 1886 to 1909, when the McMahons Point line opened. The second period covers the time until the Wynyard line was opened across the Sydney Harbour Bridge in 1932, and the third from then until the general closure of the system in 1958.

=== First period 1886–1909 ===
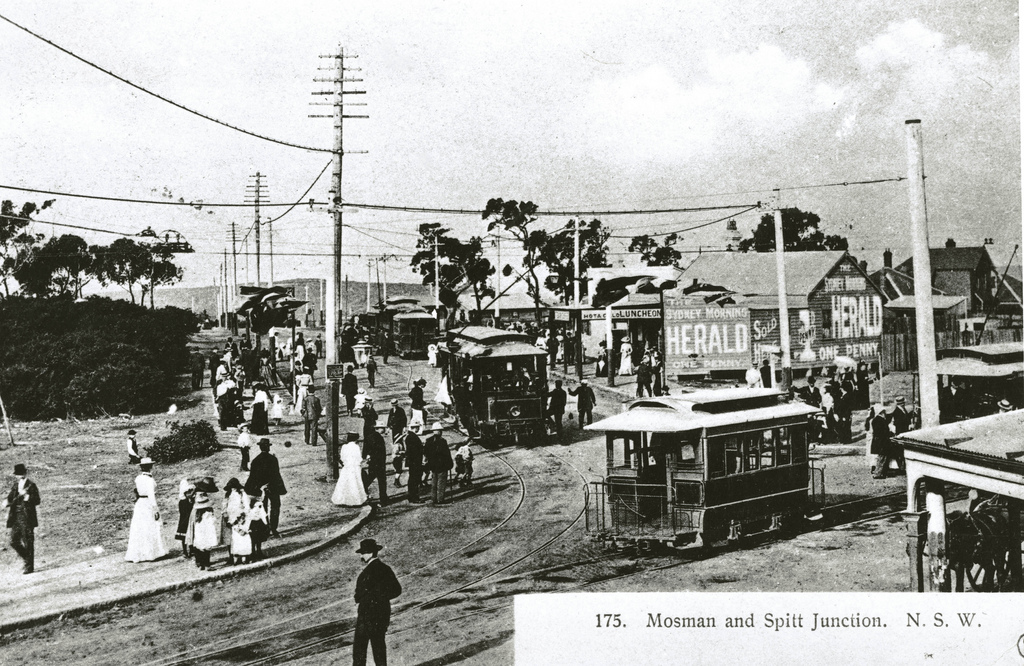
The opening ceremony for the Spit Junction tram line 3 November 1900 showing C and D class electric trams and cable trailer cars.

In the initial years of the North Sydney tramways, services operated from Milsons Point wharf to:

- Ridge Street Tram Depot was originally a cable tram depot which opened in May 1886. Services were extended to Crows Nest in July 1893. Upon conversion to electric operation in February 1900 the depot was extensively rebuilt in 1902 to enlarge the 12 road tram shed. Upon closure in the 1920s the shed was converted into a cinema, now the Independent Theatre.

=== Mosman wharf line ===
- Mosman wharf: opened as an electric line from Miller and Ridge streets, along Miller Street, Falcon Street, and then Military Road as far as Spit Junction in September 1893 and extended to Mosman wharf in March 1897. Services initially connected with the cable trams at Ridge Street and shared the cable tracks as far as Miller and Falcon Streets.

=== Chatswood line ===
- Chatswood: also opened initially as an electric line from Crows Nest with services connecting with the cable trams at Ridge Street and sharing the cable tracks as far as Crows Nest. It opened as far as Victoria Avenue, Willoughby in April 1898 and extended to Chatswood station in July 1908. Through electric services from Milsons Point began when the original cable tramway was electrified in February 1900.

=== Lane Cove line ===
- Lane Cove: opened as an electric line from Crows Nest in February 1900, with trams connecting with other electric services at Ridge Street. It was initially opened as far as Gore Hill and extended to Lane Cove in March 1909. Some through services operated to and from Milsons Point.

=== South Spit line ===
- The Spit: opened from Spit Junction in October 1900.

=== Northbridge line ===
- Northbridge: opened from Miller and Falcons Streets as far as Suspension Bridge Cammeray in May 1909, to Marana Road, Northbridge in February 1914, and to Northbridge terminus in March 1914

=== Georges Heights line ===
- Georges Heights: opened from Mosman Junction along Middle Head Road to Cobbittee Street in August 1919, for the military hospital, closed beyond the junction with the Balmoral line at Gordon Street in 1925.

=== Balmoral line ===
- Balmoral: opened as a branch of the Georges Heights line in May, 1922.

During this first period, some North Sydney tramway services did not operate to and from Milsons Point. These were:

=== Taronga Zoo Park line ===
- Ridge Street, North Sydney–Taronga Zoo: introduced over the Mosman line and the new Taronga Zoo line opened in conjunction with the relocation of the zoo from Moore Park to Mosman in October 1916.

=== Neutral Bay line ===
- Neutral Bay wharf – Neutral Bay Junction: opened in June 1900. This line had a combination of long, steep grades and only trams fitted with track brakes (which were not otherwise used on the Sydney tramways) were permitted to operate this line.

=== Cremorne wharf line ===
- Cremorne Point wharf–the Spit: opened December 1911.

=== Athol wharf line ===
- Athol wharf–Balmoral: introduced December 1923. the service operated over the Athol Wharf line, opened in October 1917, the Taronga Zoo line, a new connection in King Max Street, Mosman opened in December 1923 and the Georges Heights/Balmoral line.

=== Taronga Zoo to Lane Cove, Gore Hill and Chatswood line ===
- Taronga Zoo–Gore Hill and (later) Lane Cove and to Chatswood: operated via the Taronga Zoo and Mosman lines, Falcon Street to Crows Nest, then as for the services from McMahons Point.

=== Second period 1909–1932 ===
In September 1909, a new line was opened from McMahons Point to Victoria Cross, North Sydney and a new direct route was opened via what is now the Pacific Highway from Victoria Cross to Crows Nest. The Milsons Point line was deviated at North Sydney via Walker and Mount Streets to avoid congestion at Victoria Cross. The McMahons Point line was opened to relieve the load on the Milsons Point wharf and connecting tramway.

Services to Lane Cove and Chatswood were altered to operate to and from McMahons Point via the new direct route to Crows Nest. In conjunction with the construction of the Sydney Harbour Bridge, the Milsons Point line was diverted to a new terminus in Glen Street in July 1924. Escalators were provided to carry tram passengers to the new ferry wharf below. Otherwise, services operated as during the first period.

=== Third period 1932–1958 ===
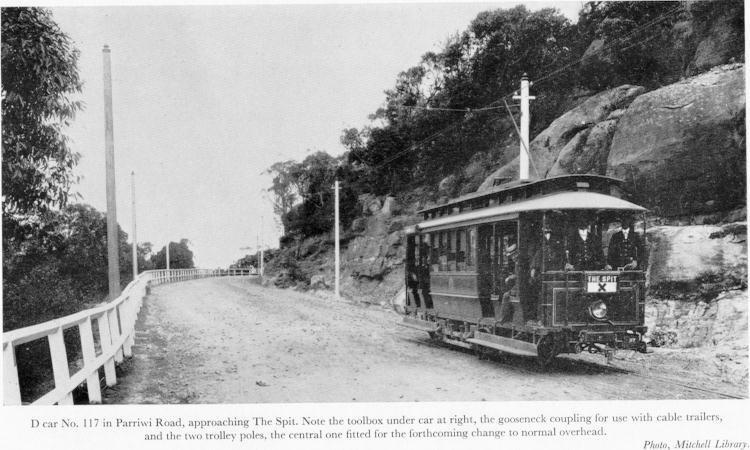
D117 on Parriwi Road approaching The Spit. The single track and contact pole at the side indicate early 1900s.

In March 1932 the Sydney Harbour Bridge with its associated railway and tramway tracks was opened and all of the above services to and from Milsons Point/McMahons Point (except the Georges Heights service, which had closed in 1925) were diverted to operate to and from Wynyard. The Milsons Point and McMahons Point lines were then closed.

From Wynyard services operated to:

=== Lane Cove line ===
- Lane Cove: Travelling along the Pacific Highway via Gore Hill, turning left into Longueville Road, terminating near the intersection of Rothwell Avenue (now Central Avenue), opposite the council chambers.

=== Chatswood line ===
- Chatswood station: Turning right off either Falcon Street or the Pacific Highway in Crows Nest, heading north along Willoughby Road, turning left onto Mowbray Road followed by a sharp right onto Penshurst Street before turning left on Victoria Avenue, where the line terminated at Chatswood station.

=== Northbridge line ===
- Northbridge: closed beyond Cammeray in May 1936 and beyond Falcon Street, North Sydney in January 1948

=== The Spit ===
- The Spit and Spit Junction line travelled north-east along Military Road passing through Neutral Bay Junction, Cremorne Junction, and Spit Junction, veering to the left (north) onto Spit Road at Spit Junction, before diverting onto Parriwi Road and terminating near the foot of the Spit Bridge.

=== Balmoral line ===
- Balmoral: reduced to limited services outside ferry operating hours following the introduction of the co-ordinated tram/ferry scheme in May 1952. This scheme was brought in following the government's purchase of Sydney Ferries Limited, and was designed to encourage greater use of ferries.

=== Taronga Zoo Park–Wynyard line ===
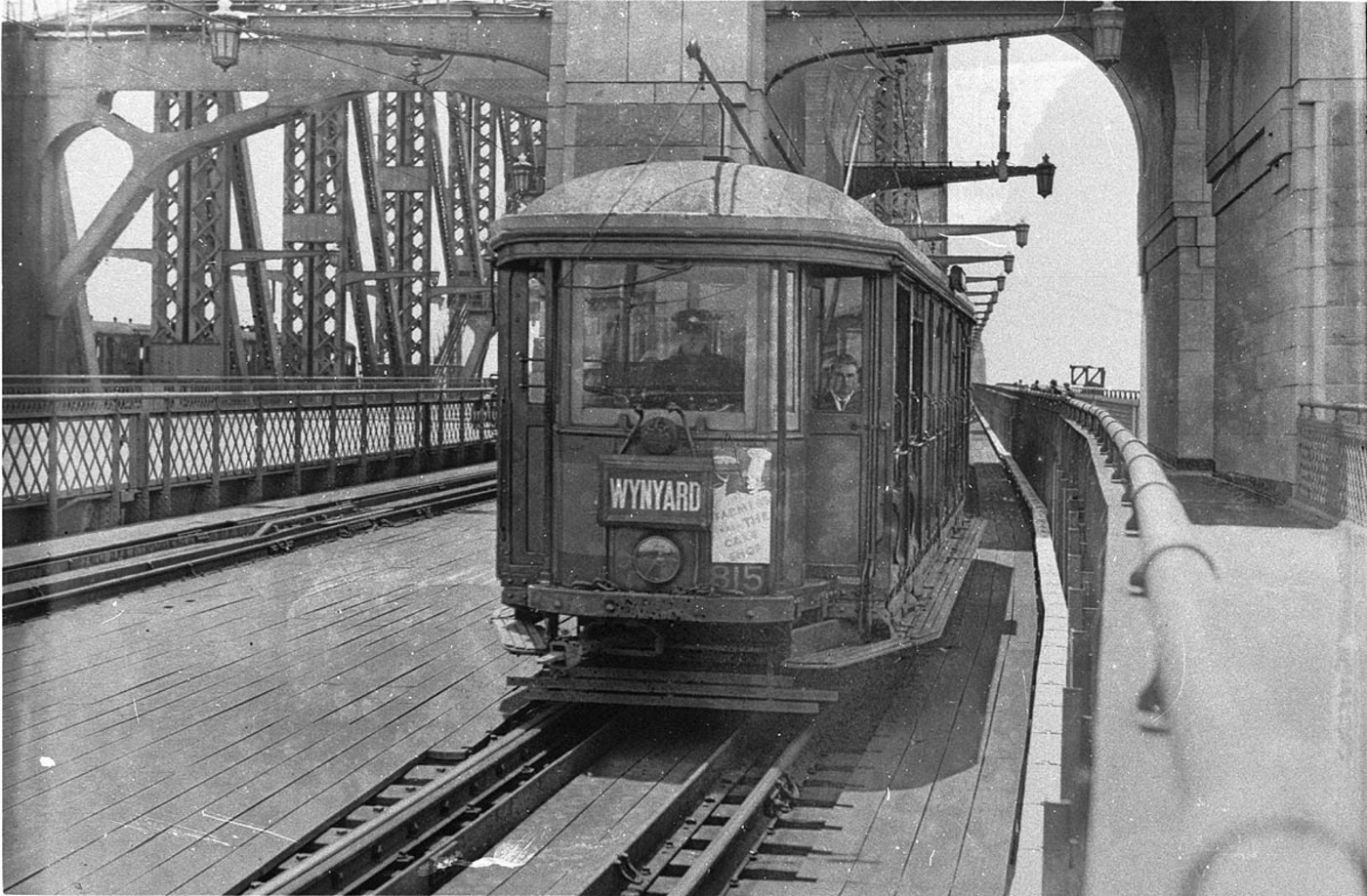
Wynyard-bound tram on Harbour Bridge, 1930–1939, Ted Hood

- Taronga Park: reduced to limited services outside ferry operating hours as stated in relation to the Wynyard–Balmoral service.

All of these lines remained open until the general closure of the North Sydney tramways in June 1958, except for the Northbridge / Suspension Bridge line, and the withdrawal of full-time services from Wynyard to Balmoral and Taronga Zoo as stated above.

=== Neutral Bay wharf line ===
- Neutral Bay wharf – Neutral Bay Junction: closed in May 1956. As mentioned above, this line had a combination of long, steep grades and windy track, and only trams fitted with track brakes (which were not otherwise used on the Sydney tramways) or dynamic (rheostatic) brakes were permitted. The single track down Hayes Street was the steepest unassisted in Sydney.

=== Cremorne wharf line ===
- Cremorne Point wharf–The Spit: the Cremorne Wharf line closed in April 1956.

=== Mosman wharf Line ===
- Mosman wharf – Cremorne Junction: The Mosman Wharf line closed in November 1955.

=== Athol wharf–Balmoral line ===
- Athol Wharf–Balmoral: A feature of this line was the steep grade down to the wharf at the terminus. Runaway trams plunged into the harbour in 1942, 1952 and 1958.

=== Taronga Zoo Park–Lane Cove and Chatswood line ===
- Taronga Zoo–Lane Cove and Chatswood station: operated via Taronga Zoo and Military lines, Falcon Street to Crows Nest, then as for the services from Wynyard

Services also operated as follows

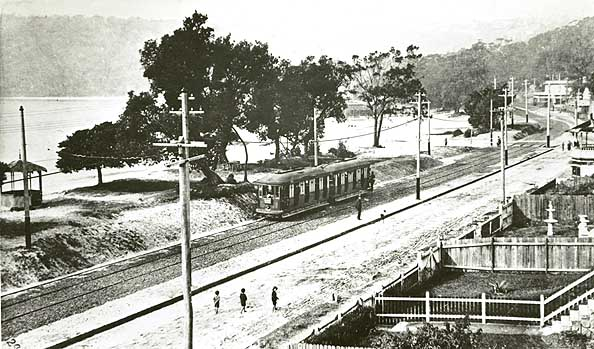
A coupled set of E class trams to Balmoral 29 May 1922

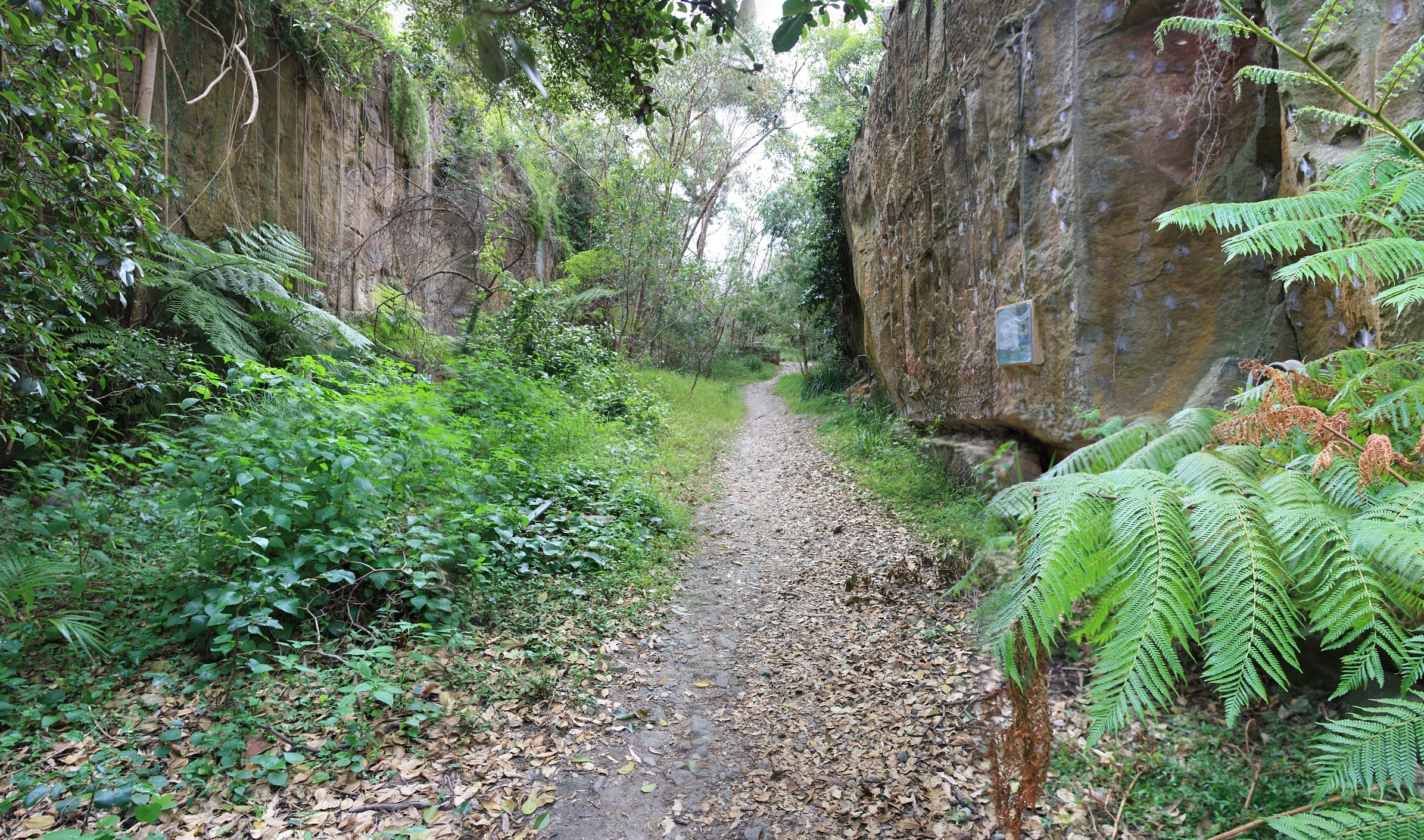
The former tram cutting to Balmoral Beach

- Balmoral–Lane Cove and Chatswood: The line from Balmoral opened as a branch of the Georges Heights line in May, 1922 and was one of the last tram lines to be opened in Sydney. It was a difficult route to construct on account of the height above sea level and the short distance to be traversed. Apart from the direct city service to Wynyard via the Sydney Harbour Bridge, cross regional services ran to Lane Cove, Athol Wharf, Northbrdge and Chatswood, making it one of the busiest lines on the North Sydney system.
- Upon departure from the Esplanade terminus, at the corner of Mandalong Road, trams travelled south-East along The Esplanade. After passing Botanic Road the line swung right onto Henry Plunkett Reserve. From this point the line went off-road and ascended uphill onto its own reservation, travelling through a narrow rock cutting, now public walking track (pictured). After a steep ascent through the reserve the line crossed several small residential streets along the way, such as; Mulbring, Gordon, Plunkett and Beaconsfield Street, before once again entering onto Gordon Street where the line swung right onto Middle Head Road. The tram then joined the mainline at the point where Bradleys Head Road, Military Road and Middle Head Road meet. Travelling along Military Road and then Falcon Street, services to Chatswood turned right onto Willoughby Road, and eventually terminated at Chatswood railway station, Victoria Avenue Terminus, while services to Lane Cove travelled along the Pacific Highway, terminating at the Lane Cove council chambers. Services to Wynyard via North Sydney swung left into Miller street before crossing the Pacific Highway and entering onto the on ramp that led to the steel arch bridge that once crossed over the Bradfield Highway and thence to the eastern side of the Sydney Harbour Bridge.

== Manly lines ==
The Manly lines originated on 14 February 1903 with steam motors hauling trailers on a line from Manly to Curl Curl (North Manly). Passenger traffic fell considerably by autumn that year, and services reverted to horse-drawn trams from 20 July 1903. However, following a considerable increase in passengers during the next four years, steam trams were returned from 1 October 1907.

A line was built to The Spit, and the Manly to Curl Curl line was progressively extended to Brookvale, Collaroy, and Narrabeen. A branch was run to Harbord. Electrification commenced with the construction of the line to The Spit, and was extended throughout the system.

The Narrabeen line was also used for carrying freight, for a spur was run to the freight wharf at Manly, and goods sidings were built at Balgowlah in Sydney Road near Wanganella Street; at Brookvale from a line in Alfred Road short of Federal Parade; and at Narrabeen near King Street.

Various track layouts and routes existed in the early days in the vicinity of the Manly terminus, with quite different arrangements existing in 1903, 1911, 1912, and 1914. The routes prior to 1914 used The Corso and North Steyne, but from 1914 were confined to Belgrave Street. The Manly lines closed on 1 October 1939.

The Manly lines, which were administered by the Railways, suffered from maladministration (as in the case of the Castle Hill line), resulting in considerable overcapitalisation of the network, unnecessary re-routing and re-building of the track at Manly terminus. Consequently, the system never made a profit. Re-building the terminal at Manly terminus several times, accompanied by costly property resumption, accounted for huge expenditures with little gain.

In 1919 planning began to move slightly the balloon loop at Manly, requiring demolition and re-building the Pier Hotel. Rebuilding track in Belgrave street and the terminus was estimated to cost £5,695, while land resumption including demolition of the Pier Hotel was estimated at £40,000 (less £3,500 from sale of land). The hotel was demolished in 1924.

The department was slow to provide a speedy service. It persisted in scheduling the long-distance trams behind the all-stops (instead of the other way around). It rejected residents' suggestions to schedule the Narrabeen tram first, and to make the first set-down at Dee Why or nearby. For nearly a decade from at least 1923, residents had been asking for faster services to Narrabeen. The trip took 49 minutes. A new timetable was introduced from 1 November 1920, giving a trip time of 39 minutes, but it proved unworkable and the timetable reverted to an old one on 4 July 1921, back to 48 minutes.

Residents wanted optional stopping and express running to Dee Why from Manly. The Railways ignored those requests, and persisted in running the Narrabeen tram from Manly, behind the all-stops trams to Balgowlah and Harbord. Finally, when the department moved to schedule Narrabeen trams first, with first set-down at Dee Why from 25 November 1931, it took only 31–33 minutes by tram from Manly to Narrabeen, down from 39 minutes previously, and down from 49 minutes when the service was inaugurated.

=== Manly to The Spit ===
This line commenced at the Spit Bridge (north side) with a balloon loop. From the balloon loop, in a reservation, the line ascended in a Right of way beside Sydney Road, Heaton avenue, crossed Ethel Street, still in a Right of way alongside Whittle Street, joining Sydney Road there.

At Parkview street there was a semi-circular deviation south, out of Sydney Road (to gain height for Spit-bound trams). At Park Avenue a Right of way took the tram north, then east alongside Raglan Street, eventually joining Raglan Street at Kangaroo Road.

From there, which was a junction for the Narrabeen line, the line turned south, finishing at a large loop at The Esplanade (Manly). The Manly to Spit section opened on 9 January 1911.

=== Manly to Harbord ===
This line commenced at Manly (The Esplanade), proceeded north along Belgrave Street, past the turnoff for The Spit, at Raglan Street, then along Pittwater Road.

Between Queenscliff and Harbord roads, the line turned into a Right of way and crossed Dalley Street, and joined Cavill Street near Lawrence Street. The line turned into Lawrence Street, then proceeded along Albert Street and Moore Road until the terminus at The Esplanade, Freshwater Beach. The single-track branch to Harbord was opened on 21 December 1926.

=== Manly to Narrabeen ===
This line commenced at Manly (The Esplanade), proceeded north along Belgrave Street, past the turnoff at Raglan Street for the Spit, and on to Pittwater Road.

It proceeded past the turnoff to Harbord and continued along Pittwater Road, all the way to Narrabeen at a bridge just north of Waterloo Road. This point was exactly 16 miles from Sydney.

The line to Narrabeen opened on 8 December 1913. It was always single track from Brookvale to Narrabeen terminus.

The line was wired with a catenary overhead, so apparently some high-speed running was anticipated, consistent with the light railway legislation for the line. Evidence of the catenary overhead is to be found in photographs in McCarthy's book.

== Hills Shire and Parramatta lines ==
=== Castle Hill ===
A steam tramway opened between Parramatta and Baulkham Hills in 1902, and was extended to Castle Hill in 1910, carrying passengers and produce to and from the area.

This tramway commenced at Argyle Street in Parramatta and tracked north along Church Street to Northmead, then along Windsor Road and Old Northern Road to Castle Hill.

In 1919, the NSW government decided to convert the tramway into a railway to encourage the subdivision of estates for residential use. This involved a new connection to the Main Western Railway at Westmead and a new line to Northmead.

The section from Argyle Street Parramatta to Northmead became an isolated line before closing not long after the railway began operations.

The railway line was later extended to Rogans Hill in 1924. The new line proved to be unsuccessful and was closed on 31 January 1932 and was seen by members of the public as turning a perfect tramway into an underperforming railway.

=== Parramatta Park to Redbank wharf ===
This was a steam tramway that headed between Parramatta Park and Redbank wharf, with a major stop at Parramatta city centre, the point where it met Route 101. This route was owned by the ferry companies as a way to get all the way down the Parramatta River and deliver passengers and goods. It would follow along the Sandown railway line from Camellia onwards, and serve the industries along the line.

== Rolling stock ==
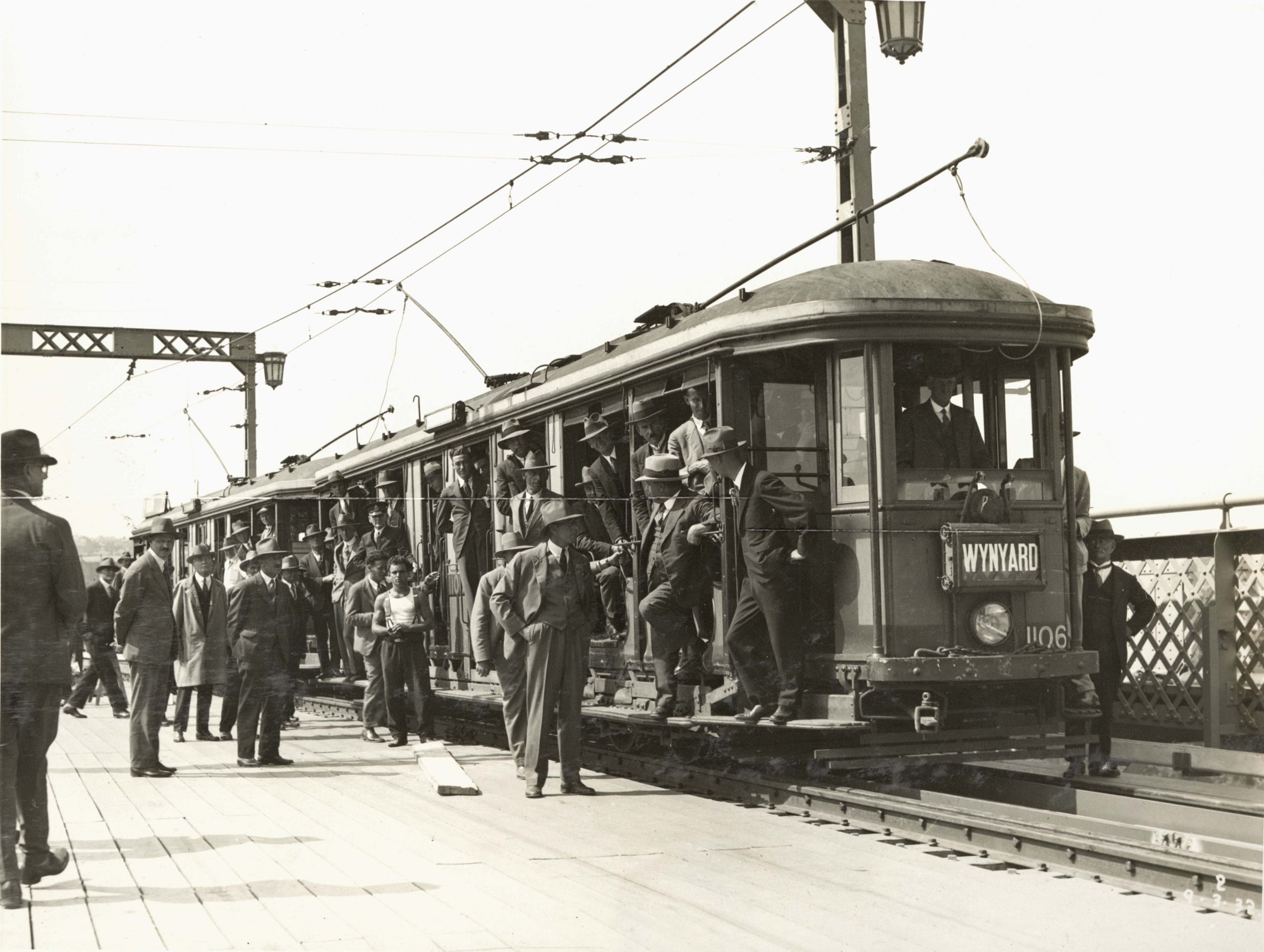
O1106 at the Sydney Harbour Bridge opening in May 1932

In 1905, an alphabetical classification was introduced to the NSW Government Tramways. Generally the letters A and B were allotted to steam stock, with letters C to R (R1) (with the exception of the letters I and Q) to electric cars based on the seating capacity of the class. The letter S was added after the fleet number for service (non-passenger) stock.

Perhaps the most famous well-remembered of the electric trams that operated in Sydney were the O and P class trams known officially as footboard cars, after the footboards running along the length of each side of these trams, and upon which conductors precariously balanced to collect fares. They were mostly referred to as toastrack trams for their cross-bench wooden seating layout that resembled a toast rack of the time.

Their high seating capacity of 80, with a crush load of 180 when in coupled set, was a major advantage for Sydney's crowded system, specialty for major events such as The Royal Easter Show at Moore Park and horse race meetings at Randwick Racecourse. They were routinely coupled in pairs to run as Coupled Set. 626 O class and 258 P class trams were constructed from 1908, with some remaining in service until 1958 with the closure of the George Street lines.

The first modern corridor style tram numbered 1738 of the R Class was introduced on 29 September 1933, offering 48 seats in the comfort of being fully enclosed from the weather, padded upholstered seating in the main saloons and the safety of a corridor running internally the full length of the tram assist with the collection of fares and movement between seats, these cars were seen an improvement comfort wise over the older "toastrack trams" however lacked the seating numbers of the O and P classes.

Originally 200 of the R class were ordered, however the last 5 of the class had modifications made to them during construction due to consultation with both staff and the traveling public to increase the number of seating and ease of movement, These cars 1933 to 1937 were known as the R/R1 class cars and the modifications were distinctly noticeable compared to both the R and R1 classes.

The final order of tramcars for Sydney was for the R1 class. Like their predecessors the R Class, these cars were of the corridor arrangement and built to body shape closer to the R/R1 class. However unlike the R class the R1 class had only one saloon (as opposed to a saloon at either end and a drop-centre section in the middle) but had the increased seating of 56. The First 50 were ordered and delivered prior to World War 2, with a further 250 ordered in the late 1940s, however due to steel shortages after the war, the first of the 250 did not enter service until 1950 with the last entering service to North Sydney Depot in 1953.

Due to the delays in receiving trams and ongoing steel shortages, the last 150 of the order was cancelled spelling the final end of Sydney's trams. Some of these cars had not been in service long enough for a major overhaul before their withdrawal between 1958 and February 1961.

Unlike the preceding O and P class trams that were fitted with Multiple Unit equipment, neither the R nor R1 classes were fitted and so could not operate in coupled sets. They could be coupled, however there was no provision to operate them in coupled service because there were no cables for air or power connections to the trailing car due to the lack of equipment.

Upon withdrawal, most cars were stripped of their metal components such as bogies and anything that either could be used to keep other trams running or sold as salvageable scrap metal.

Cars were then towed from their respective depots or driven directly to Randwick Tramway Workshops at the end of their last day of operation and the placed on the sidings known in tramway circles as 'burning hill'. As many as 15 trams could be burnt in any one day during the height of tram disposal.

Some were sold as stripped shells to private users to be used as campground shelters and storage sheds (all classes) or workers/camping accommodation (mostly those of the R and R1 class).

Trams burnt of the R, R/R1 and R1 classes, although mostly made of steel construction, were less than 8 years old at time of being burnt and was seen by some members of society as an official act of vandalism and a waste of resources (especially steel) by the government of the period.

In 1950, L/P class tram 154 was the first of Sydney's trams (and first in Australia) to be preserved the fledgling Australian Electric Traction Association, later known as the Sydney Tramway Museum, beginning the preservation of nearly every class of tram. The collection of preserved trams has grown to include the last known examples of some classes and even enabled the recreation of multiple set operations of a coupled set of O class cars, however there are no known examples of the G, H or M classes of trams.

== Accidents ==
- On 21 August 1924, a coupled set of E-class cars ran out of control near McMahon's Point, derailed and crashed into a house. There were two fatalities, and the trams were extensively damaged.
- On 10 November 1924, steam tram motor 88A as well as 2 steam tram trailers derailed due to a misaligned rail at Miranda. The driver Sam Wyatt was the only one killed, however 19 others were also injured. A Z20 class steam engine, as well as the Eveleigh accident crane were deployed to clean up the site. 88A would be scrapped at Randwick Workshops.
- In 1929, a P-class tram crashed into a barber's shop on the corner of Quay and Ultimo Roads near Central Station. Almost half of the tramcar ended up in the shop.
- There were accidents at Athol Wharf, Taronga Park, when trams lost control running down the steep hill and ended up in the harbour, in 1942, 1952 and 1958.
- Scores of accidents – some fatal – befell tram conductors while collecting fares from the footboard of moving trams. Very early trams were enclosed, but those built from the early 1900s had no corridor. These trams included E-class, K, L, P, and O-class. Many falls are recorded in the Sydney Morning Herald. The most common injuries included death, head injuries including fractured skull and concussion. Examples of fatal falls are found in the same publication.

== Workshops ==
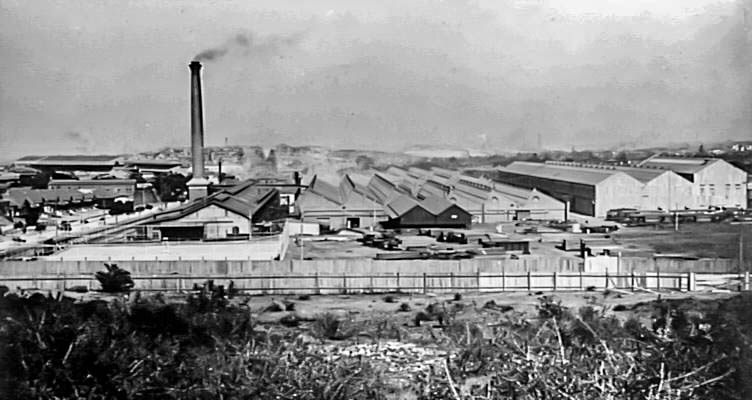
Randwick Tramway Workshops 1919

Locomotive workshops were established at King Street, Randwick in 1881 to build and service Sydney's trams. In 1902 the workshops were renamed the Randwick Tramway Workshops.

On 2 August 1917, along with 3000 workers from the Eveleigh Railway Workshops, 1100 workers from Randwick Workshops began the Great Strike that lasted until 8 September 1917.

The workshops grew rapidly to become one of Sydney's largest engineering establishments peaking in around the 1920s.

Reduction in Sydney tramway diminished the Tramway Workshops functions and led to its eventual closure as a maintenance facility in 1961.

From 1961 until 1974, R1 class tram 1979 shunted trams on Burning Hill until the last burnings were completed. 1979 along with 93u (cut down to a flat bed) were later used to transport equipment and components that were manufactured in the last operating sections to points around the site for delivery as some sections of the workshops prohibited the use of motor vehicles.

Later the site was used by Sydney Buses as a bus depot, the western side as University of New South Wales and TAFE NSW.

== Depots ==
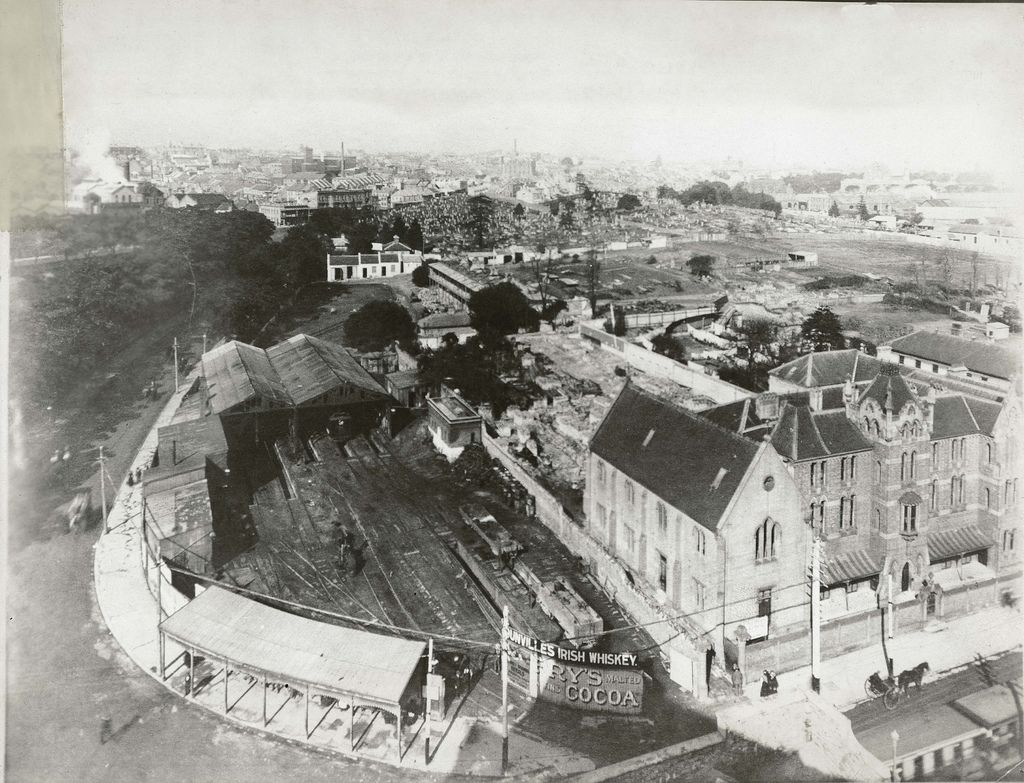
Sydney's first Tramways depot, corner of Pitt Street and what was then Gipps Street West and Garden Road, looking SE across the Old Cemeteries towards Surry Hills. Eddy Avenue roughly follows Garden Road, circa 1880.

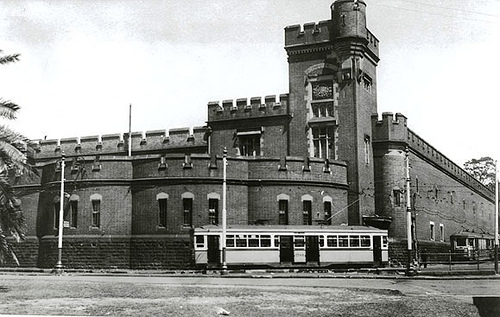
Fort Macquarie Tram Depot

- Dowling Street Depot served the lower Eastern Suburbs (Coogee, La Perouse, Clovelly, Maroubra), and inner southern suburbs (Alexandria, Rosebery, Botany). The largest tram depot in Australia and it was the last to close in 1961 when the La Perouse line closed. The site is now the Moore Park Homemaker's Supacenta.
- Waverley Depot served the Bondi and Bronte routes. Closed in 1959, now the site of a bus depot.
- Rozelle Depot served the inner western suburbs routes to Leichhardt, Balmain, Birchgrove, Abbotsford and Lilyfield. Closed in 1958, reopened in 2016 as Tramsheds shopping centre.
- Newtown Depot served routes via King Street, Newtown to Summer Hill, Canterbury, Earlwood, and services to Glebe. Closed in 1957, has been neglected to the point of collapse. In 2012 the forecourt was converted into a public plaza, providing a new entrance to Newtown railway station.
- North Sydney Depot served the lines via North Sydney. Closed in 1958. The open part was converted into North Sydney Bus Depot, while the car sheds were retained and incorporated into a supermarket. The site has since had many changes however still has a small bus depot on site.
- Ultimo Depot served routes to Pyrmont, Ryde, and Erskineville. It was situated on the eastern side of Harris Street adjacent to the Darling Harbour goods yard next to the Ultimo power station. It closed as a tram depot in 1953, becoming a bus depot, which later closed. The depot has since become storage and workshop space for the Powerhouse Museum.
- Rushcutters Bay Depot served the Watsons Bay line. Closed in 1960.
- Fort Macquarie Depot served the Circular Quay–Railway Square service, and services to Woolloomooloo. Closed 1955, now the site of the Sydney Opera House. A large balloon loop encircled the depot allowing trams to turn around without changing ends.
- Manly Depot served the isolated Manly lines until closure in 1939. The depot was converted to a bus depot before being closed when Mona Vale and Brookville bus depots opened
- Enfield Depot served the isolated Ashfield- Mortlake/Cabarita lines. Closed in 1948 and reused as a bus depot until it closed in 1989. The water tank, originally used by the steam trams and later as part of the fire suppression system, was removed and is now at the Tramway Museum in Loftus.
- Rockdale Depot served the isolated Rockdale–Brighton-Le-Sands line. Closed 1949.
- Dolls Point Depot was for the isolated Kogarah to Sans Souci steam tramway. Closed 1937, and replaced by a trolleybus depot at Ramsgate.
- Tempe Depot served the Cooks River and Marrickville/Dulwich Hill lines. Closed 1954, became a bus depot then closed. Used as a storage facility for withdrawn buses. Former site of the Sydney Bus Museum before the museum moved to Leichhardt Depot. In 2010 it reopened as a Sydney Buses depot before being transferred to Transit Systems.
- Leichhardt Depot was only a storage depot for trams and some light maintenance works. Served as a bus depot till a new depot was opened next door in 2009. It is now the home of the Sydney Bus Museum.

== Remnants ==
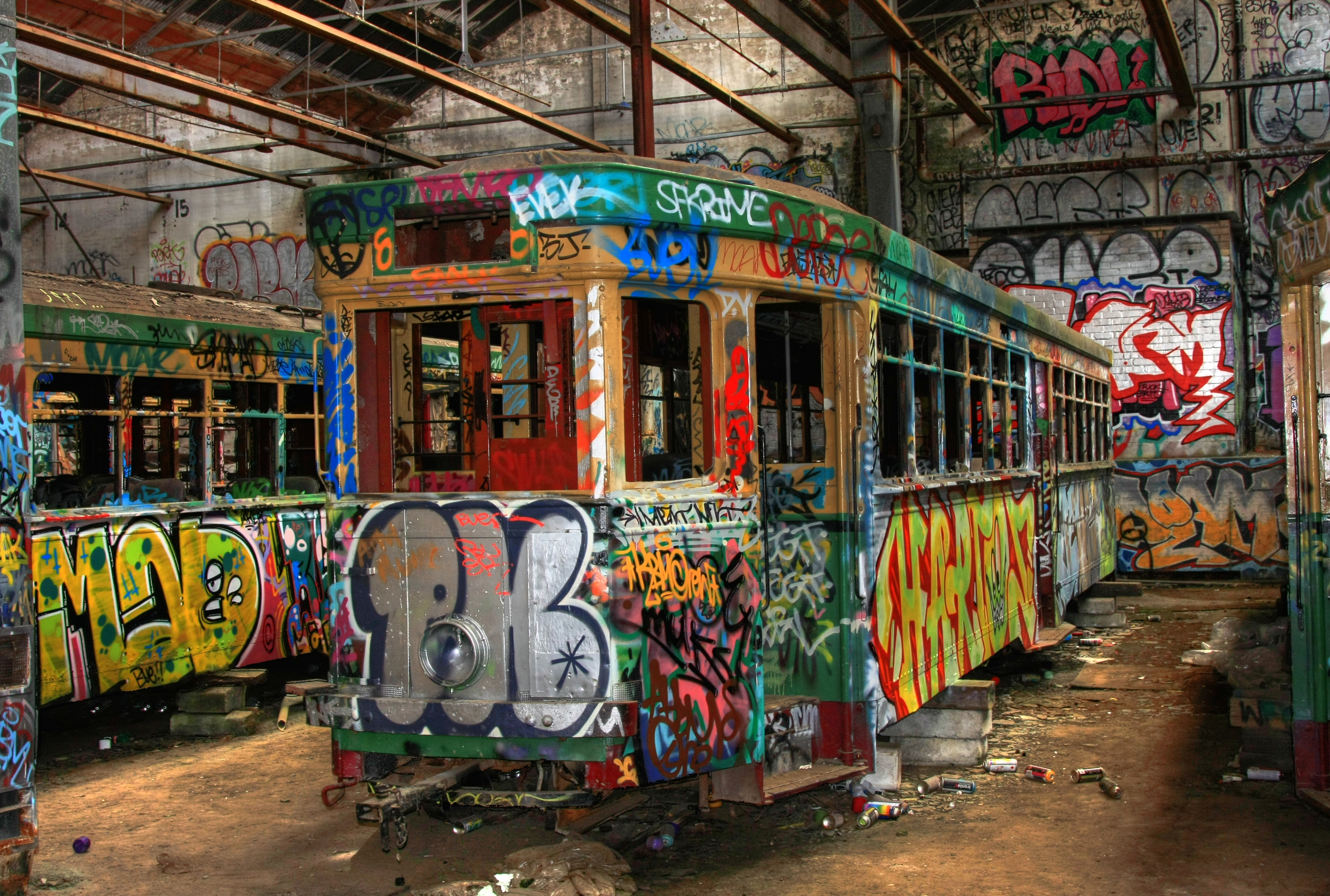
An abandoned tram at the Rozelle Tram Depot before being turned into the Tramsheds shopping centre

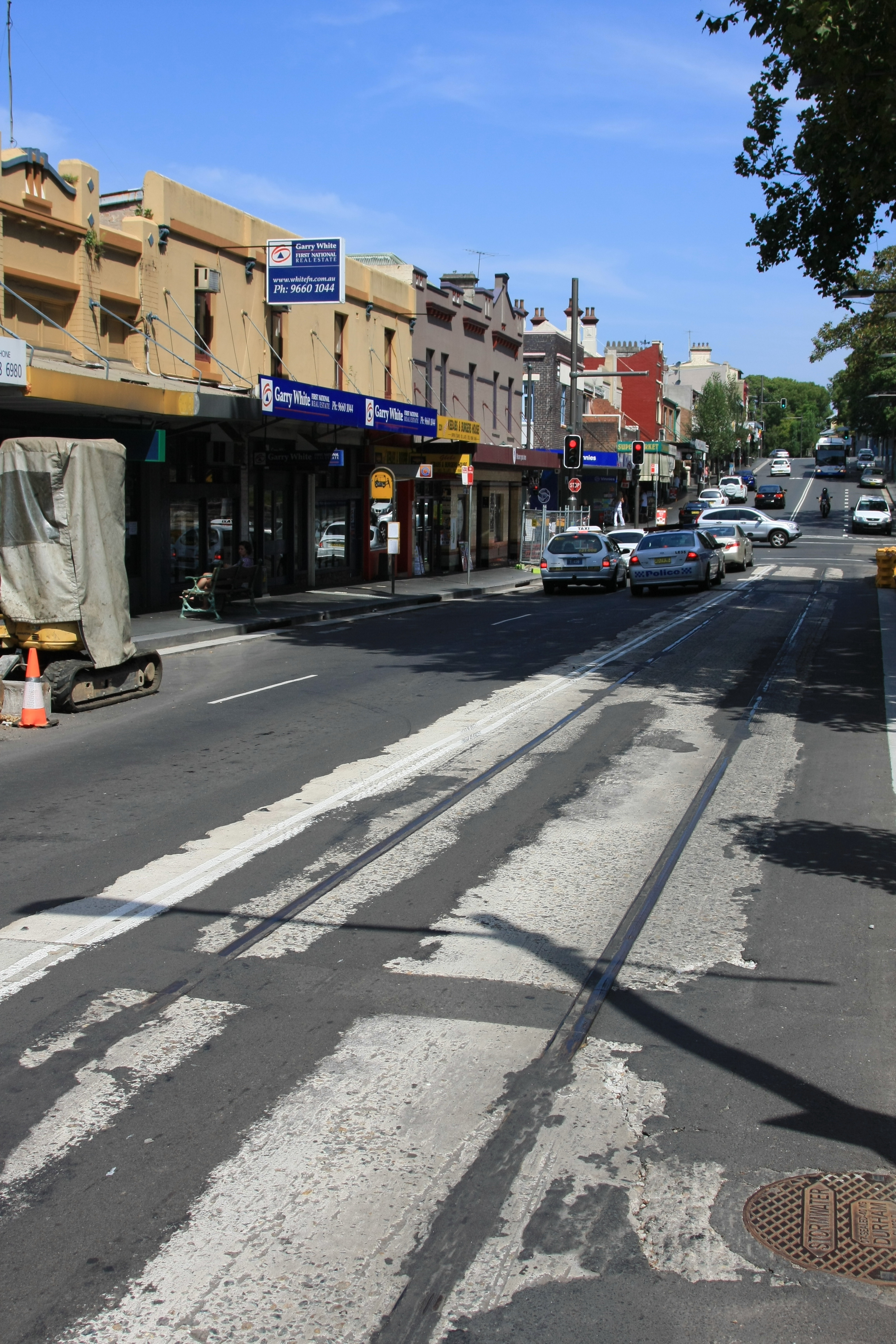
Exposed tram track in Glebe Point Road

- C11 tram built by Hudson Bros that went into service on the early electric tramline from Rose Bay to Ocean Street, Woollahra, on 29 August 1898. It is now on static display at Powerhouse Museum, Sydney.
- On Glebe Point Road, a small section of the original tram tracks were uncovered during roadworks in late 2009. The City of Sydney have left these exposed to serve as a historical reminder.
- A section of uncovered tramway track was, until late 2015, visible along O'Dea Avenue in Zetland. The single track was visible through the concrete road surface for a few hundred metres, but was mostly removed during storm water improvement works through 2015–2016. The removal of this section can be seen in Google StreetView Timeline, where the lines were clearly visible in 2014, but began to be obscured in later years. Occasionally other buried sections of track are exposed when roadworks are carried out. For example, at the intersection of Victoria Avenue and Penshurst Street, Chatswood, extensive tram tracks are visible whenever road resurfacing is carried out.
- There is a small section of tram track going in both directions on Lower Fort Street Road in Millers Point.
- There is a small fragment of tram track exposed in the Moore Park grounds near the Sydney Cricket Ground.
- There is a small fragment of tram track exposed on Old South Head Road, Watsons Bay at the top of Heart Break Hill.
- There is a small section of tram track exposed on Great North Road, near the old Abbotsford terminus.
- The tracks in Pitt and Castlereagh Streets were asphalted over and were not removed. Occasionally they appear through the road surface.
- Several ornate tram shelters still stand, such as at the corner of Park and Elizabeth Streets, City.
- At North Bondi and Bronte, bus shelters are built into small cuttings that were previously tram stops.
- On some former tramway reservations, there are cuttings made for tramlines through sandstone rock, most notably the deep cuttings at Bronte and Balmoral, and where what is now Havelock Avenue passes under Brooke Street at Coogee.
- Ornamental rosettes located where overhead wiring span wires were attached can be seen on many older buildings and rock faces, there are seven on a rock wall near the Sydney Opera House at the site of Fort Macquarie Depot as well as on buildings in the CBD.
- Many street corners where trams turned were 'cut-back' to allow space for trams to turn, and subsequently many buildings on such corners still have rounded fronts.
- The abnormally wide median strip in Anzac Parade south of Kingsford once accommodated tram line to La Perouse and Maroubra Beach.
- Between Beach Road and Ramsgate Ave on Campbell Parade Bondi Beach, the area between the lanes that is now car parking space was once the line from Bondi to North Bondi.
- The open space at North Bondi that is the bus terminal was once a three track terminal for all lines to Bondi. The terminal was cut into the hill and was filled in for bus operations.
- When walking up the steps to The Gap at Watsons Bay, there is flat ground in between two sets of steps. This continues for a fair way in both directions, and is the old tram right of way.
- The round cut rock wall opposite Mosman Bay ferry wharf was cut back to allow a balloon loop for the trams.
- Some depot buildings still exist (see Depots above).
- Tunnel Portals to Wynyard from the Sydney Harbour Bridge still exist and can be seen from the pedestrian walkway.
- Former location of Wynyard tram platforms is now part of the Wynyard Lane Car Park at the station. The
- Millers Point tram tracks were buried by bitumen when the lines were closed, as the line which comprised the stop at Millers Point, was dug up around 1979–80 and the tram lines were removed and a new road surface laid.
- During construction of the CBD and South East light rail at many points workers found many of the original tracks under the road surface. Rail that was salvageable was donated to the Sydney Tramway Museum.

A map of these and other surviving physical remnants has been created. See "Sydney Tramway Remnants Map" in "External Links" below.

== Legislation ==
The following acts of the New South Wales Parliament applied to tramways.

Pitt-street Tramway Act of 1861 No 12a: "An Act for the construction of a Tramroad from the Redfern Railway Terminus to the Semi-Circular Quay. [30 April 1861.]" – only allowed the use of "horses or other animals of draft".

Pitt-street Tramway Act of 1861 Repeal Act 1866 No 28a: "An Act to repeal the Pitt-street Tramway Act of 1861. [6 December 1866]"

Redfern to Hunter-street Tramway Act of 1879 No 14a: "An Act for the construction of a Tramroad from the Redfern Railway Terminus to Hunter-street Sydney. [7 May 1879]" Authorised the first line of what was to become one of the largest tramways in the world.

Consolidated Revenue Fund (No 6) Act 1879 No 20a: Allocated 11,000 pounds for the construction the Redfern to Hunter Street line, including rolling stock.

Tramways Extension Act 1880 No 11a: "An Act to authorise the construction and maintenance of Tramways along certain Streets and Highways in the City and Suburbs of Sydney and elsewhere. [28 April 1880]" – authorised the first parts of what was to become the Bondi Line, as far as Bondi Junction, a branch via Crown and Cleveland Streets to Anzac Parade, the first part of the Coogee line as far as Randwick, the first part of the Bronte line from Bondi Junction to Charing Cross, the line in George Street from Town Hall to Railway Square, the first part of the Botany line, the first part of the Canterbury line, the Glebe Point line and some other sections that were not built.

Jeanneret's Tramway Act: "An Act to authorize the construction and maintenance of a Tramway along George-street Parramatta, [9 August 1881]" Authorised the Parramatta Park – Redbank Wharf private steam tramway, the last steam tramway in Sydney.

Appropriation Act of 1883 No 14a: Granted a gratuity of 300 pounds to the widow and five children of a tram conductor accidentally killed while on duty.

Tramways Declaratory Act 1883 No 18a: "An Act to declare legal the employment of Steam Motors on Tramways constructed worked or maintained in pursuance of the Tramways Extension Act 1880. [2 June 1883]" – legalised the use of steam motors on the tramways, such use having been previously declared illegal by the Supreme Court.

Saywell's Tramway Act of 1884: "An Act to authorize the construction and maintenance of a Tramway from the proposed Bay-street Station on the Illawarra Railway to and along Lady Robinson's Beach. [6 March 1881]"

Balmain Tramway Act of 1886: "An Act to authorize the Borough of Balmain to contract for the construction and maintenance of Tramways within the said Borough. [30 July 1886]"

West Wallsend and Monk-Wearmouth Railway Act of 1886: "An Act to enable the West Wallsend Coal Company (Limited) and the Monk-Wearmouth Colliery Estate Company of Australia (Limited) to construct a Railway from the West Wallsend Coal-fields to the Sydney and Waratah Railway. [27 August 1880]"

Saywell's Tramway Act Amendment Act 1887: "An Act to amend Saywell's Tramway Act of 1884. [28 April 1887]" Confirmed the existing loop at Rockdale station and allowed up to two further loops to be built.

Willoughby and Gordon Tramway Act of 1887:"An Act to authorize the construction and maintenance of a Tramway from the terminal point of the Saint Leonards Cable Tramway Saint Leonards to Forest Reserve No. 97 parish of Gordon. [13 July 1887]" Authorised a private tramway via Miller Street, Palmer Street and Bellevue Street, Cammeray then through private land and across Long Gully, i.e., what became the Northbridge line. The schedule to the act describes the route proposed to take the line from Long Gully to East Willoughby.

Government Railways Act of 1888 No 9a: "An Act to make better provision for the management of the Government Railways and Tramways of New South Wales and for other purposes connected therewith. [17 May 1888]" – replaced the Commissioner for Railways (who also controlled tramways) by three commissioners, and allowed for a separate railway and tramway construction authority.

Public Works Act of 1888 No 11a: "An Act to provide for the constitution of an Authority to investigate and report upon proposals for Public Works and the carrying out thereof when authorized by Parliament, to make better provision for the acquisition of land for carrying out such Works, and for other purposes in connection therewith. [6 June 1888.]" – established the Parliamentary Standing Committee on Public Works, to consider and report upon all non-military public works the estimated cost of completing which exceeds twenty thousand pounds. If approved by the committee, an act of Parliament had to be passed to authorise the work. Works costing up to 20,000 pounds could be approved by the governor, i.e. effectively by the minister.

North Shore, Manly, and Pittwater Tramway and Railway Act of 1888: "An Act to authorize the construction of a Tramway from the northern terminus of the North Shore Cable Tramway to the Spit at Middle Harbour, and from the Spit aforesaid to Manly Village, and a Light Rail way thence to Pittwater, Broken Bay. [10 January 1889]" – authorised a private tramway from the end of the Milsons Point to Ridge Street cable tramway to Manly, and a light railway from Manly to Pittwater.

Appropriation Act of 1889 No 33a: Allocated funds (777 pounds 16 shillings) for the expenses of the Royal commission appointed to inquire into the charge made against members of Parliament and others in connection with the proposed leasing of the government tramways.

Willoughby and Gordon Tramway Act Amending Act 1890: "An Act to amend the Willoughby and Gordon Tramway Act of 1887. [17 September 1890.]" – altered the route of the Northbridge line between Cammeray and the Long Gully Bridge, and authorised its extension to East Willoughby and branches to what was later the Northbridge terminus, to Middle Cove and an extension of the main line from East Willoughby to Castle Cove.

Loan Act of 1890 No 33a: "An Act to authorize the raising of a Loan for the Public Service of the Colony and for other purposes. [20 December 1890]" – Allocated £75,000 to be spent on additional rolling stock and to meet expenses of experiments in connection with electric trams.

King to Ocean Street Cable Tramway Act of 1892 No 10a: "An Act to sanction the construction of a Cable Tramway from King-street via William-street, in the City of Sydney, to Ocean-street, in the Borough of Woollahra. [16 March 1892]"

Willoughby and Gordon Tramway Acts Amending Act of 1893:: "An Act to amend the Willoughby and Gordon Tramway Act of 1887, and Willoughby and Gordon Tramway Act Amending Act. [14 February 1893]" – increased the amount of private land to be taken from a width of 22 feet to 132 feet, again amended the route approaching the south end of Long Gully Bridge, and amended the route of the main line to East Willoughby.

George-street and Harris-street Electric Tramway Act 1896 No 11a: "An Act to sanction the construction of an Electric Tramway from Circular Quay, in the City of Sydney, to the Redfern Railway Station, and along Harris-street from its intersection with George-street to its intersection with John-street in the said city. [14 September 1896]" Authorised the first permanent electric line forming part of the main system.

Loan Act of 1896 No 33a: "An Act to authorise the raising of a Loan for the Public Service of the Colony, and for other purposes. [16 November 1896]" – allocated 150,000 pounds for electrification of existing tramways and for electric rolling stock, and 130,500 pounds for construction of the George Street and Pyrmont electric lines.

Loan Act of 1897 No 43: "An Act to authorise the raising of a Loan for the Public Service of the Colony, and for other purposes. [10 December 1897]" – allocated 20,000 pounds for additions to workshops and buildings, additions to tramway lines and rolling Stock, and for other purposes.

Public Works Act 1900 No 26: "An Act to consolidate the Acts relating to Public Works." [22 September 1900] – clarified and consolidated existing legislation.

Electric Tramway (Belmore Park to Fort Macquarie) Act 1900 No 63: "An Act to sanction the construction of an electric tramway from Belmore Park through Castlereagh, Bligh, and Loftus Streets to Fort Macquarie, returning through Pitt-street, and certain works in connection therewith; and for other purposes." [5 December 1900]

Sutherland to Cronulla Tramway Act 1908 No 16: "An Act to sanction the construction of a tramway from Sutherland to Cronulla; and for other purposes. [15 December 1908]" – authorised the original steam tramway to Cronulla, on a different alignment to the present railway.

Harris-street to Evans-street, Balmain, Electric Tramway Act 1908 No 25: "An Act to sanction the construction of an electric tramway from Harris-street, via Miller-street, Abattoir-road, Glebe Island Bridge, and Weston-street to Evans-street, Balmain; and for other purposes. [21 December 1908]" – authorised the connecting line from Pyrmont to Rozelle, via Glebe Island Bridge.

The Spit to Manly Electric Tramway Act 1908 No 26: "An Act to sanction the construction of an electric tramway from The Spit to Manly; and for other purposes. [21 December 1908]"

Cremorne Tramway Act 1909 No 12: "An Act to sanction the construction of an Electric Tramway from the Military-road, North Sydney, to Cremorne Point; and for other purposes consequent thereon or incidental thereto. [7 December 1909]"

Darley-road, Randwick, to Little Coogee Tramway Act 1910 No 32: "An Act to sanction the construction of an Electric Tramway from Darley-road, Randwick, to Little Coogee; and for other purposes. [28 December 1910]" – Authorized what was later known as the Clovelly Line.

Tramways (Carriage of Goods) Act 1911 No 22: "An Act to authorise the carriage of goods upon tramways; to amend the Government Railways Act, 1901; and for purposes incidental thereto. [21 December 1911]" – authorised the carriage of goods on tramways, except on the George, Pitt and Castlereagh street lines in the city.

Transport Administration Act 1988 No 109: "An Act .... to provide for the administration of public transport in New South Wales; and for other purposes." – allows the Director-General of Transport to develop or operate light rail systems, or facilitate their development or operation by other persons – was the legislative basis for the first part of current line from Central station to Lilyfield, and provides governing law for that line.

Transport Administration Amendment (Light Rail) Act 1996 No 128: – established the Transport Administration Corporation to set regulations applying to the current line from Central station to Lilyfield, including extensions.

Transport Administration (General) Regulation 2000 – Reg 14: Declared the route of the extension of the current line from Wentworth Park to Lilyfield.

Transport Administration Amendment (Rail Agencies) Act 2003 No 96: Established the Transport Infrastructure Development Corporation

== Legacy ==
- Much of the former State Transit bus network generally reflect the area and routes covered by the tram network.
- Suburbs with "Junction" in their name reflect their tramway heritage, such as Bondi Junction and Maroubra Junction, as do localities within other suburbs, such as Randwick Junction, Spit Junction, and Cremorne Junction. The names of other former tramway junctions in Sydney have fallen into disuse, but some still are heard infrequently, such as City Road Junction.
- The easternmost southbound traffic lanes on the Sydney Harbour Bridge were originally constructed to carry the City and Suburban Railway but were used for trams, and are still separated from and clearly distinguishable from the other six road lanes, with the remnants of the eastern Milsons Point station (tram) located at the site of the former northern toll plaza of the Cahill Expressway.
- Wynyard railway station platforms are still numbered from 3 to 6. Platforms 1 and 2 were tram platforms and the railway platforms were never renumbered when the tram platforms were removed.
- On many buildings within the CBD of Sydney, Rosettes are still attached to walls on streets that trams ran on. These are the points of attachment for the overhead wires used to provide power to the trams.
- White Bay (derelict) and Ultimo (now the Powerhouse Museum) power stations were constructed by the New South Wales government to provide power to both the railways and the tramways survive.
- Rozelle (Now Tramsheds), Newtown (derelict), Ultimo (owned by Powerhouse Museum as storage), Tempe (Now Transit System Bus Depot), Waverley (Now Sydney Buses Depot) and Leichhardt (Now as the Sydney Bus Museum and Transit Systems bus depot) tram depots all still exist.
- Shoot through like a Bondi tram is a phrase still used in Sydney, meaning to depart in haste.
- Preserved Steam Motor Tram Motor 1A, owned by the Powerhouse Museum, Motor 100A (operational) at the Museum of Transport & Technology, Auckland New Zealand, Motor 103A (operational) at Valley Heights Rail Museum with trailers 93B (operational) and 72B (Awaiting restoration) and replica Double Deck trailer built by Randwick Workshops on the frame of K class car 746.

== See also ==
- Light rail in Sydney
- List of light-rail transit systems
- Public transport in Sydney
- Trams in Australia
- Transportation in Australia
- Sydney Tramway Museum
- List of former tramway junctions in Sydney
