= Sydney bus route 400 =

Bus route in Sydney, Australia

400
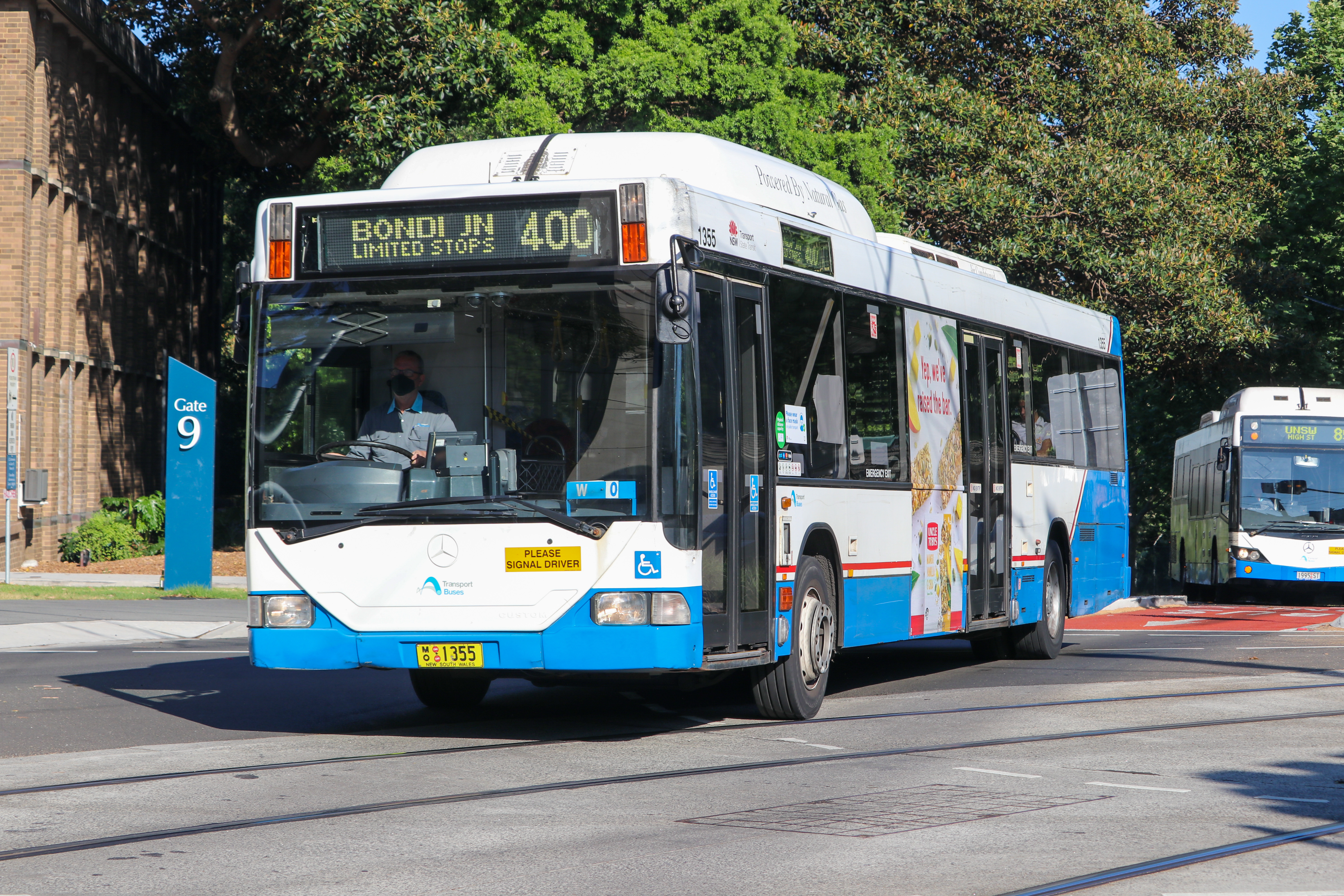
- State Transit Custom Coaches bodied Mercedes Benz 0405NH in October 2020

Overview
- Operator: State Transit
- Depot: Port Botany; Randwick; Waverley
- Began service: 17 July 1989
- Ended service: 4 December 2021
- Former operator: Transit Systems

Route
- Start: Bondi Junction station
- Via: University of New South Wales; Westfield Eastgardens
- End: International Airport

Sydney bus route 400 was a limited stops bus service in Sydney, Australia operated by State Transit between Bondi Junction and Burwood until 2018. From 2018 to 2021, it operated a truncated route between Bondi Junction and International Airport only, until it was discontinued. In its original form, it was Sydney's busiest bus route.

In 2021, it was replaced by Route 390X between Bondi Junction station and Maroubra, Route 350 between Maroubra and Sydney Airport and Route 420 between Burwood and Mascot via Sydney Airport.

== History ==
Route 400 commenced operating as a limited stops service between Bondi Junction and Burwood stations on 17 July 1989. It was operated under the Metroline 400 banner. The route was initially operated every 30 minutes on Mondays to Saturdays.

On 13 January 1991, a Sunday service was introduced. On 20 November 1994, the frequency was increased to every 20 minutes. On 23 June 2002, short workings between Bondi Junction and Rockdale station were renumbered 410. Services on this latter section operated as frequently as every five minutes in peak periods. Initially all trips covered the full route, in its last years, up to half the journeys were short workings between Bondi Junction and Westfield Eastgardens.

Route 400 was initially operated out of Kingsgrove and Randwick depots. In 1993 services operated by Randwick were transferred to Waverley. In a reorganisation of routes operated by various depots in 2013, some trips were allocated to Port Botany and Randwick depots.

In the 12 months to June 2014, route 400 was the busiest route in Sydney with 4.7 million boardings. From 1 July 2018 until 29 September 2018, it was jointly operated by State Transit and Transit Systems, following the latter taking over Burwood and Kingsgrove depots.

From 30 September 2018, route 400 was split in two. State Transit continued to operate route 400 between Bondi Junction and International Airport, while new route 420, operated by Transit Systems, was introduced between Westfield Eastgardens and Burwood. At the same time route 410 ceased.

On 2 December 2018, route 400N, an all stops night version of route 400, was introduced between Bondi Junction and Westfield Eastgardens. Routes 400 and 400N ceased on 4 December 2021 as part of a restructure of routes in the Eastern Suburbs following the opening of the CBD and South East Light Rail.

In 2022, route 420 was truncated to operate between Mascot and Burwood, no longer serving Eastgardens.

== Vehicles ==
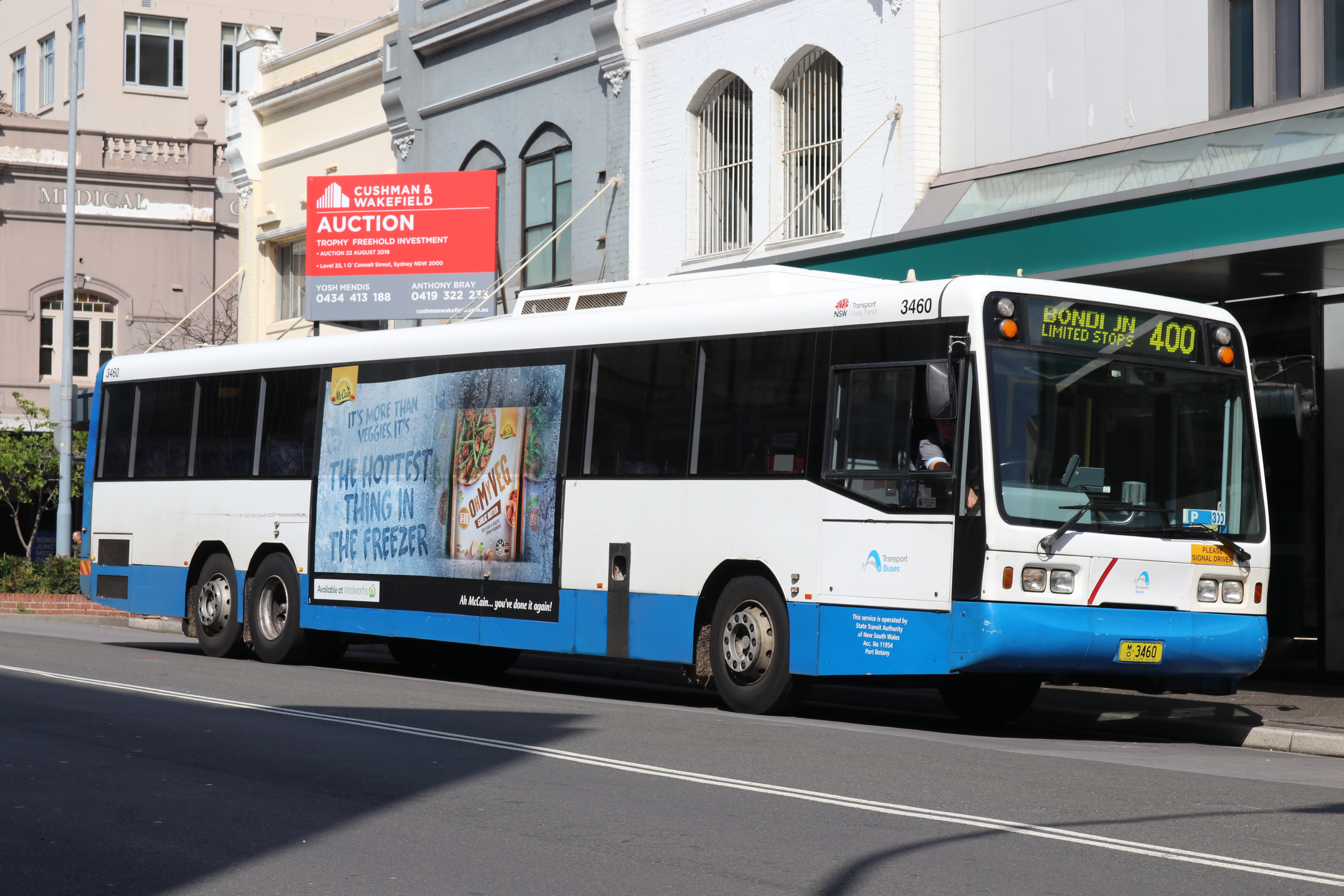
Ansair bodied Scania L113TRB in September 2019

Route 400 was initially operated by a fleet of ten dedicated Pressed Metal Corporation bodied Mercedes-Benz O305 buses. These were selected as they were fitted with dot matrix displays at a time when most of the fleet still had calico blinds and, as the route would cross regions, none had all of the required destinations.

In September 1993, 14.5 metre Ansair bodied Scania L113TRBs were introduced. Unlike the O305s these did not carry route branding. These were replaced by standard length buses.

== Route ==
Route 400 operated via these primary locations:

- Bondi Junction station
- Randwick
- University of New South Wales
- Westfield Eastgardens
- Mascot station
- Domestic Airport
- International Airport
