= Zero Emission Buses Program =

Program in New South Wales, Australia

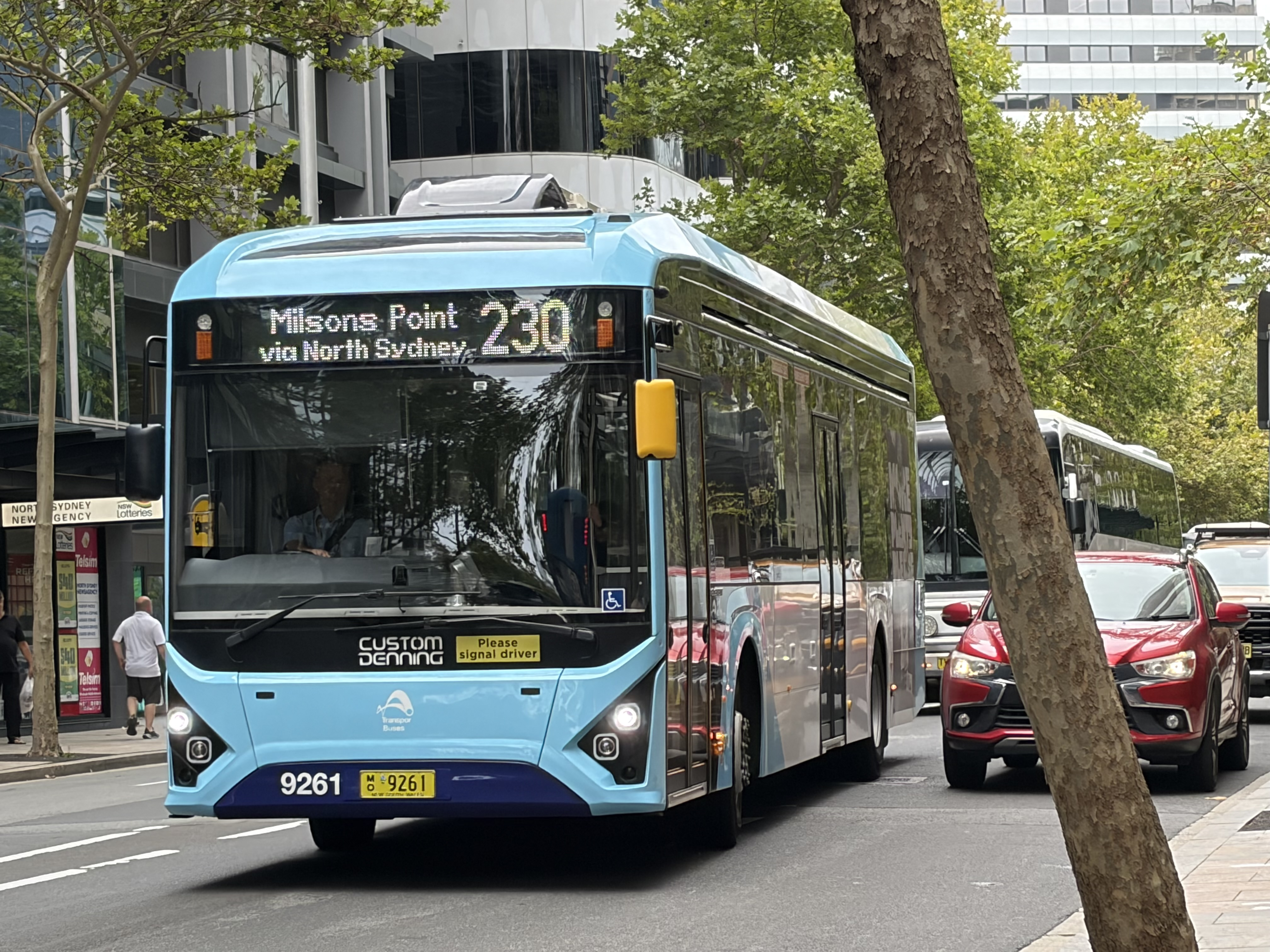
- Keolis Northern Beaches Custom Denning Element
- Owner: Transport for NSW
- Country: Australia
- State: New South Wales
- Launched: 2019
- Status: Ongoing
- Website: ww.nsw.gov.au

The Zero Emissions Buses Program is a program initiated by the Government of New South Wales, Australia to replace 8,000 buses that rely on diesel or natural gas fuels and replace them with electric buses.

The project aims to have all buses in Greater Sydney running on renewable energy by 2035, in outer metropolitan regions of Sydney by 2040 and in regional New South Wales by 2047.

== History ==
In February 2019, the first electric bus in New South Wales, a Yutong E12, commenced operating with the Premier Transport Group in Nowra.

In October 2019 Minister for Transport Andrew Constance announced the Berejiklin government's intention to convert all 8,000 buses in New South Wales to electric buses by 2030. This was later revised to 2035, in outer metropolitan regions of Sydney by 2040 and in regional New South Wales by 2047.

Prior to 2023, buses and coaches accounted for 78% of Transport for NSW's greenhouse gas emissions.

== Depots ==
As at September 2026, 14 existing Sydney bus depots are to receive electric charging technology to support the fleet of approximately 1,200 new electric buses. The depots to be converted are:

Existing Depot Conversions
Depot	Region	Status	Completion Date
Brookvale	8	Completed	September 2025
Kingsgrove	6	Planning	
Leichhardt	6	In progress	2026
Penrith	1	In progress	2026
Menai	10	Planning	
Mona Vale (Note: Partial Conversion)	8	In progress	Mid 2027
North Sydney	8	In progress	2027
Port Botany	9	Planning	
Smeaton Grange	2	Planning	
South Granville	3	Planning	
Taren Point	10	Planning	
Tempe	6	Planning	
Waverley	9	In progress	2026
Willoughby	7	Planning	

A new depot under construction at Macquarie Park is planned to house around 165 electric battery powered buses.

== Vehicles ==
In February 2019, the first electric bus in New South Wales, a Yutong E12, commenced operating with the Premier Transport Group in Nowra. In July 2019 Transit Systems took delivery of four Gemilang bodied BYD K9s to be trialled out of Leichhardt Bus Depot.

In December 2020, Transit Systems ordered 31 Gemilang bodied BYD K9s for operation of out Leichhardt Bus Depot. In February 2022, an order for 79 Custom Denning Elements was placed by Transport for NSW.

In December 2024, 319 new electric buses were ordered from Custom Denning, Foton Mobility, Volvo and Yutong. In September 2025, 95 Volgren bodied BYDs and 56 Custom Denning Elements were ordered.
