= Sydney bus route 333 =

Australian bus route

333
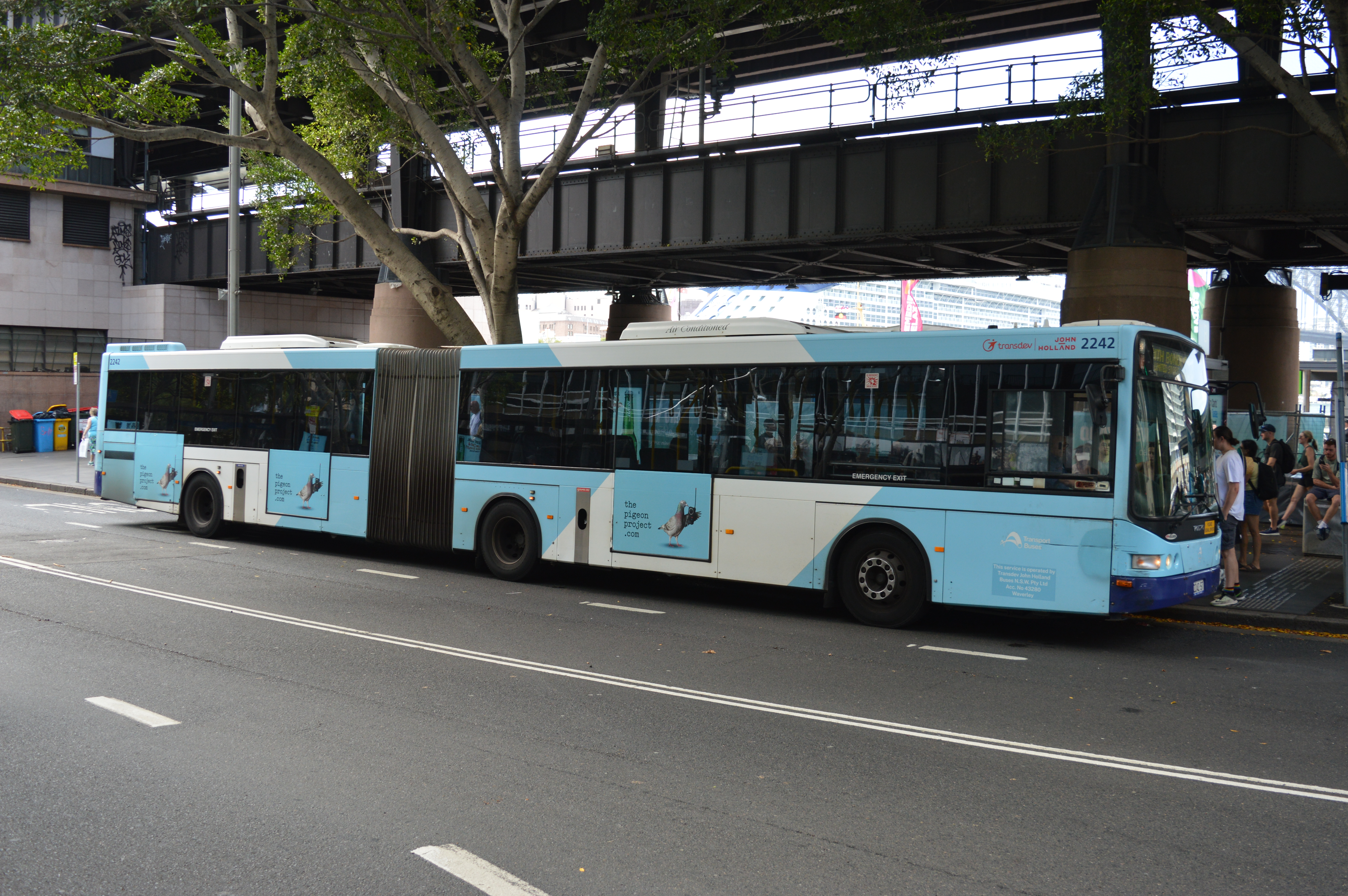

Overview
- Operator: Transdev John Holland
- Depot: Waverley
- Vehicle: Volgren bodied Volvo B12BLEA Volgren bodied Scania K360CA
- Predecessors: 380, L82
- Former operator: State Transit

Route
- Start: Circular Quay
- Via: Elizabeth Street; Oxford Street; Bondi Road; Bondi Beach
- End: North Bondi

Service
- Level: Daily

Sydney bus route 333 is a limited-stop 24-hour bus route operated by Transdev John Holland between Circular Quay and North Bondi via Bondi Junction and Bondi Beach. It is Australia's most patronised bus service, recording more than nine million passenger journeys in the 2025-26 financial year.

== History ==
State Transit commenced operating in October 2006 as the first full-time prepay only bus route in Sydney.

When Opal cards were rolled out across Sydney, route 333 became the second route to use Opal cards on 6 December 2013.

In September 2018, bus services in the Eastern Suburbs underwent a major overhaul which included timetable changes. As part of changes, overnight services of route 380 were replaced by route 333N which stops at all bus stops between the CBD and North Bondi. In 2018/19 route 333 was Sydney's busiest bus route. From 24 January 2021, route 333 became a 24-hour service with route 333N withdrawn. In April 2022 it was included in the takeover of Sydney Bus Region 9 by Transdev John Holland. 20 years of operation on this route was marked on 8 October 2026 by the NSW government running new busses on the route; the Scania K360CA6X22MB.

== Current route ==
Route 333 operates via these primary locations:

- Circular Quay
- Martin Place
- Museum station
- Taylor Square
- St Vincent's Hospital
- Paddington
- Bondi Junction
- Bondi Beach
- North Bondi
