= Sydney bus route 190X =

Bus service in Sydney, Australia

190X
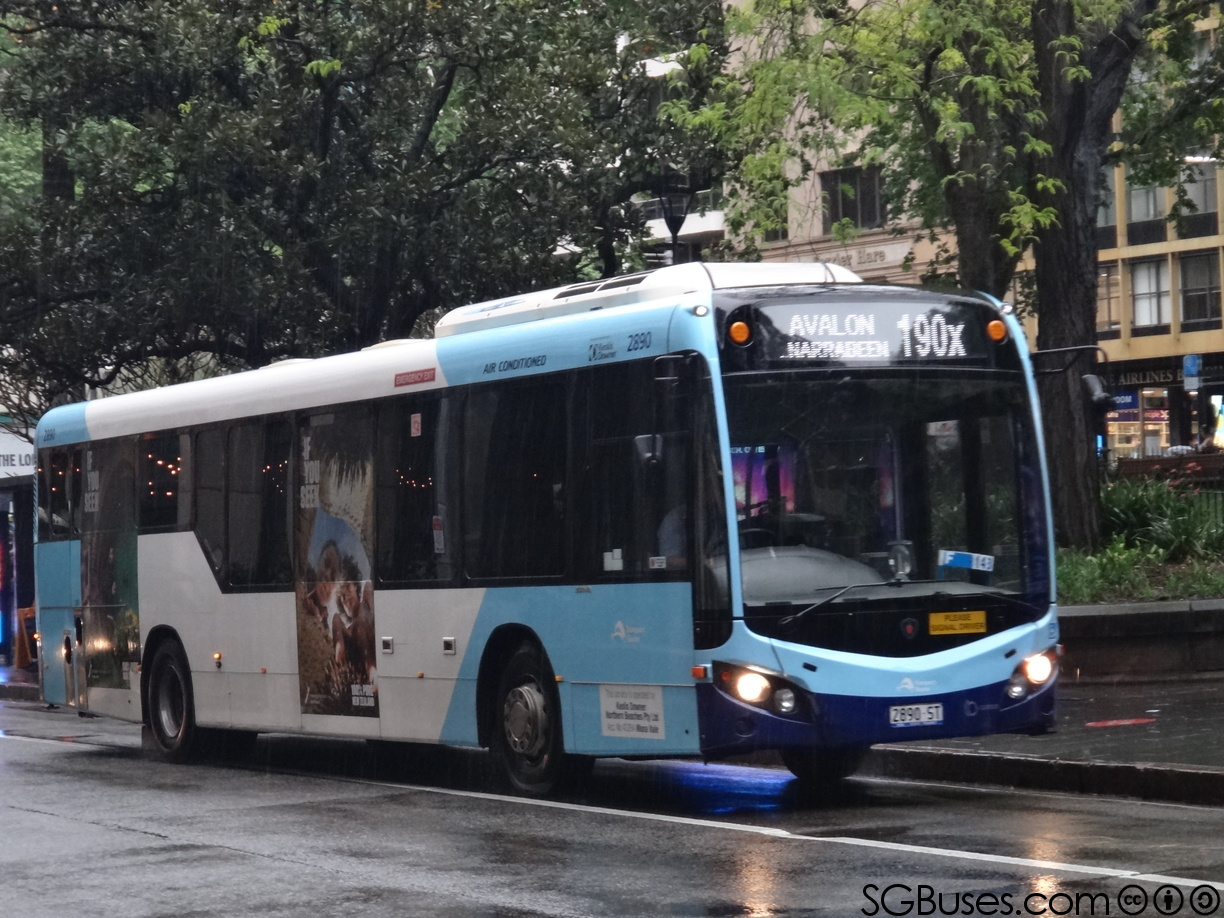
- Keolis Northern Beaches Custom Coaches bodied Scania K310UB in October 2022

Overview
- Operator: Keolis Northern Beaches
- Depot: Mona Vale
- Predecessors: Route 190, L90
- Former operators: State Transit; Urban Transit Authority; Public Transport Commission; Department of Government Transport

Route
- Start: North Avalon
- Via: Avalon; Newport; Mona Vale; Warriewood; Narrabeen; Spit Junction; Neutral Bay Junction
- End: Wynyard station

Service
- Operates: Weekday peak-hours
- Timetable: Transport for NSW

Sydney bus route 190X is a peak-hour express bus service operated by Keolis Northern Beaches between Avalon and Wynyard station. The route and its predecessors are well known for its ocean scenery along the journey and have been popular with hikers planning to walk from Palm Beach back towards Sydney. For many years the route was also the longest commuter bus route in metropolitan Sydney at 45 kilometres (28 mi) when operating from Palm Beach.

== History ==
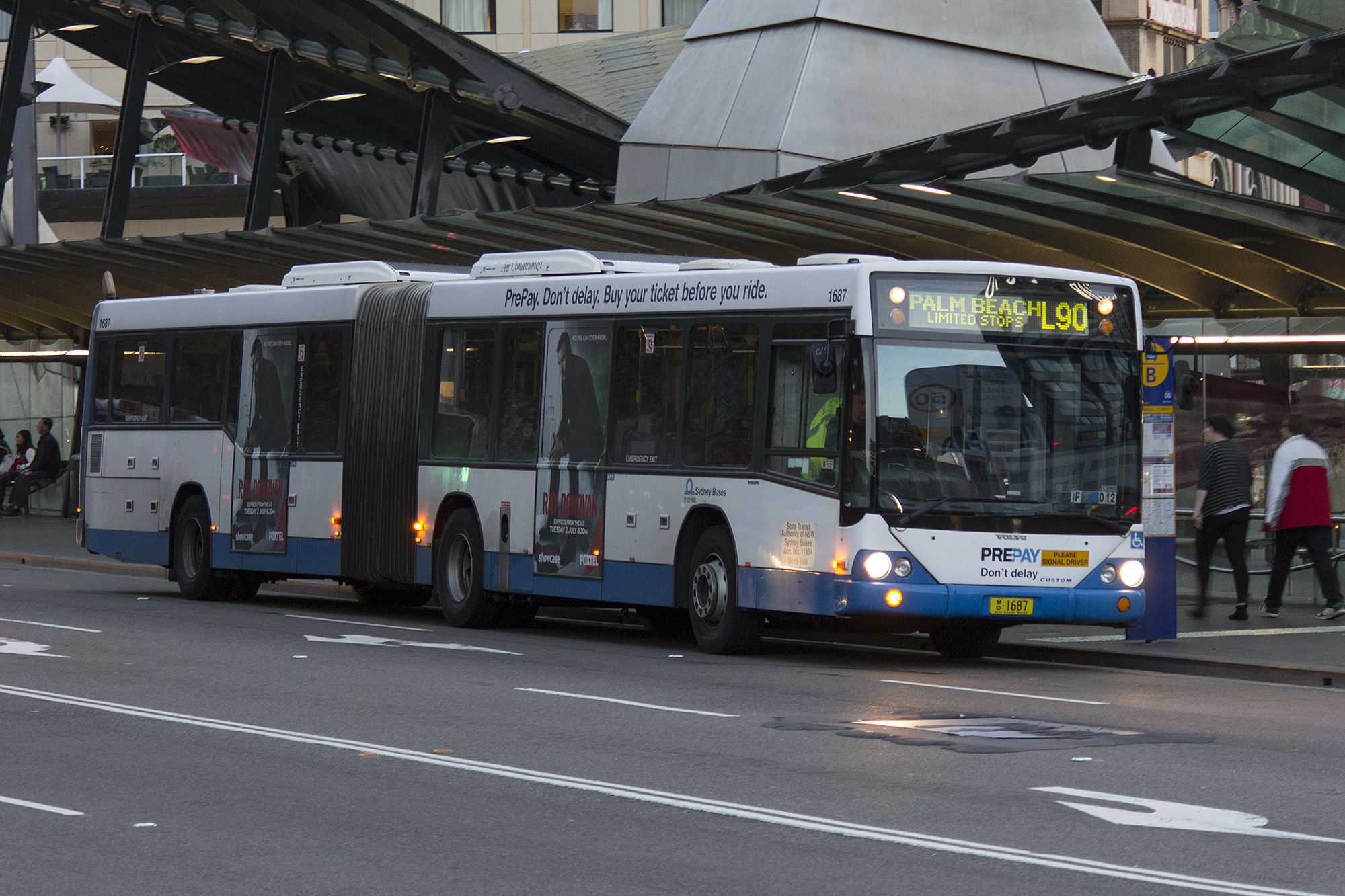
State Transit Custom Coaches bodied Volvo B12BLEA at Railway Square in July 2013

On 3 August 1953, route 150 Palm Beach to Wynyard station was renumbered 190. Initially infrequent services were provided, complementing other shorter routes along Pittwater Road. As traffic increased, higher capacity double-deck buses were introduced, albeit still with an irregular timetable. Double-deck buses continued to be a regular feature on the route due to the large catchment area along the route.

With continued population growth on the Warringah Peninsula overcrowding and long journey times became a problem on the long route. In an effort to relieve the situation express services were introduced where inbound City services did not pick up passengers south of a certain point and outbound Palm Beach services stipulated a first set down point. The actual stop for last pick up or first set down varied with each service and was denoted individually in the timetable. Initially introduced during peak hours, the express services were subsequently expanded even to off-peak services.

Route 190 to Palm Beach and sister route 189 to Taylors Point were the last bastions of the double-deck buses on the Sydney network, whereas the remainder of the network was moving to smaller single-deck buses as the former required a driver and conductor with higher associated labour costs. These routes remained double-deck due to the impracticality of running frequent single-deck services on such a long stretches and the sharp curves at Bilgola, known as the Bilgola Bends. In April 1986 Barrenjoey Road was widened allowing Mercedes-Benz O305 articulated buses to replace Leyland Atlantean double-deckers.

In the 1990s, route 190 services were renumbered as L90 to designate it as a limited stops service with standardised stopping pattern operating with regular clock-face frequency. In this guise, the route reached a zenith forming the trunk of public transit to the Warringah Peninsula stopping at major locations from the city to Narrabeen and then all stops to the terminus at Palm Beach. Shortly after the southern terminus was extended from Wynyard station to Railway Square. Short running services commencing or terminating at Avalon Beach were designated route L88. Routes L90 and L88 alternated to provide a frequent 15 minute frequency throughout the day. Early morning and late night services operating all stops retained the 190 route number.

Increased urban sprawl and population growth in the 2000s in the Hills District, New South Wales resulted in several long bus routes to the City and route L90 lost the title of longest commuter bus route to route 642X. In October 2015, the section of route L90 south of Wynyard was withdrawn when bus routes along George Street were withdrawn to facilitate CBD and South East Light Rail construction works.

Changing trends in public transport planning moved emphasis from single-seat journeys to separate local and trunk routes, with the latter operating regular, frequent and fast limited stop services with high-capacity buses . To this end the B-Line opened on 26 November 2017 resulting in route L90 being relegated to a tourist service operating at 60 minute frequency during weekday off-peaks and weekends. At the same time route 190 was discontinued completely.

On 3 May 2020 remaining route L90 services were renumbered 190X to standardise route numbers, the limited-stop designation was subsequently retired. This was short-lived, following a major review of bus services on the Warringah Peninsula in the following year, the off-peak route 190X services to Palm Beach were discontinued completely due to poor patronage and duplication with other routes. As a nod to the prior historical importance the route number was not retired, instead peak hour express services from Avalon to Wynyard previously operated as part of route 188X were renumbered to 190X.

From inception the route was government operated. In October 2021 it was included in the takeover of region 8 by Keolis Northern Beaches.

On 17 July 2023, as part of other minor changes to Northern Beaches bus services, Route 190X was extended to North Avalon.

== Current route ==
As of July 2023, route 190X operated via these primary locations:

- North Avalon
- Avalon
- Newport
- Mona Vale
- Warriewood
- Narrabeen
- Spit Junction
- Neutral Bay Junction
- Wynyard station
