= L90 =

L90 may refer to:

- Ocotillo Airport (FAA LID: L90), in Ocotillo Wells, California, U.S.
- HMS Ledbury (L90), an escort destroyer
- Sydney bus route 190X, previously known as route L90, in Australia
- Aermacchi M-290 RediGO, originally known as L-90 TP Redigo, a trainer aircraft
- Renault L90, a car manufactured by Renault Pars
- LG L90 Dual, a smartphone running Optimus UI
- Onvo L90, a battery electric full-size crossover SUV
