= H-class Sydney tram =

H-class
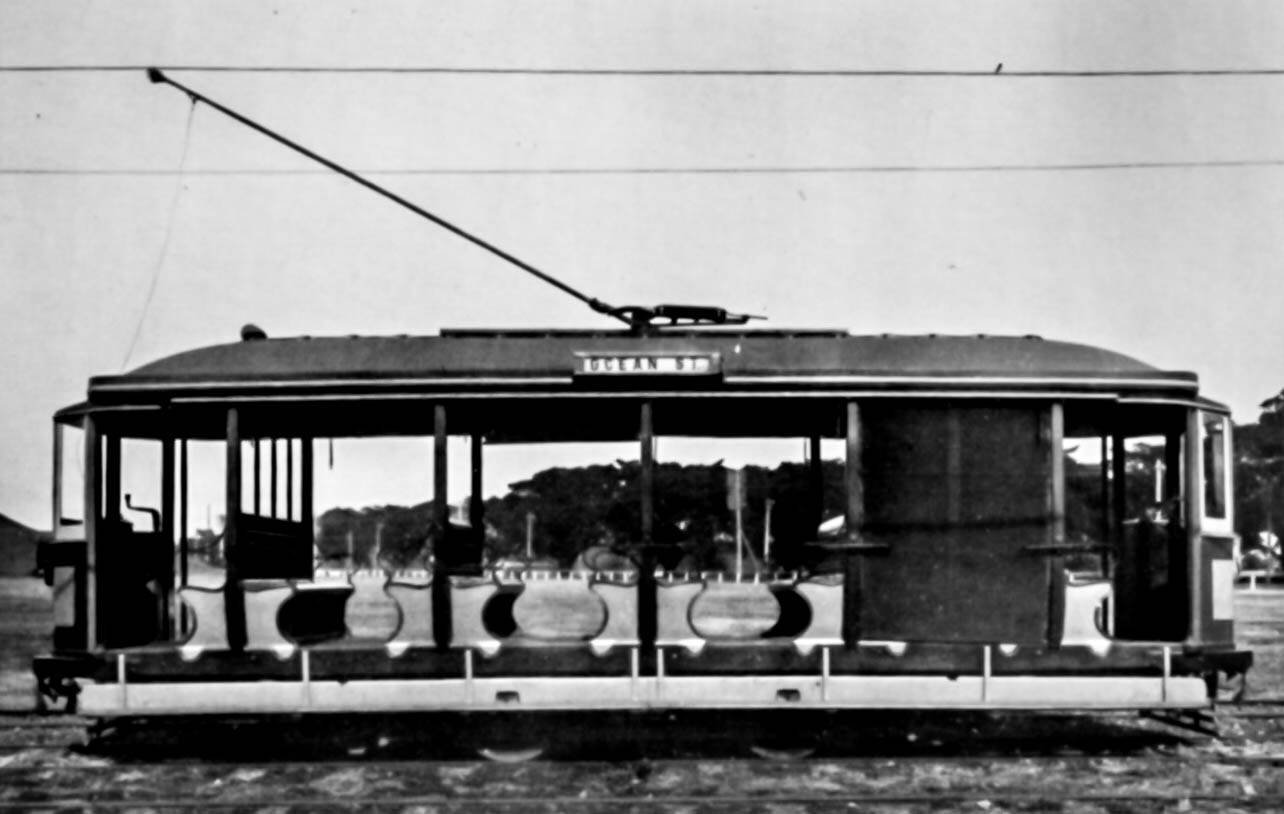
- Manufacturer: Randwick Tramway Workshops
- Constructed: 1907
- Number built: 2
- Fleet numbers: 739-740
- Capacity: 50 (Seated)

Specifications
- Train length: 26 ft 10 in (8.18 m)
- Height: 12 ft 1.5 in (3.70 m)
- Doors: Open cross bench car - no doors
- Maximum speed: 60 km/h
- Weight: 11.6 long tons (11.8 t)
- Steep gradient: Equipped with additional mechanical "slipper" track brakes.
- Power output: 2 x 48 hp
- Electric system(s): 600 V DC Trolley Wire
- Current collector(s): Trolley Pole
- Track gauge: 1,435 mm (4 ft 8 1/2 in)

The H-class trams were purpose built single truck, open cross bench cars built at Randwick Tramway Workshops as tourist cars for the City - Bondi Beach/Coogee and City - La Perouse/Botany services.

They later moved to Ridge Street Tram Depot to operate on the Neutral Bay line and again to Rushcutters Bay to operate on the Watsons Bay line.
