= H-class tram =

H-class tram may refer to:

- H-class Melbourne tram, built 1913
- Sydney H-Class Tram, built 1907

== See also ==
- H type Adelaide tram
- H1 type Adelaide tram
