= Brookvale Bus Depot =

- Interactive map of Brookvale Bus Depot

Location
- Location: Pittwater Road, Brookvale
- Coordinates: 33°45′59″S 151°16′11″E

Characteristics
- Owner: Transport for NSW
- Operator: Keolis Downer Northern Beaches
- Depot code: V

History
- Opened: 5 October 1952

Brookvale Bus Depot is a bus depot located on Pittwater Road in the Sydney suburb of Brookvale on Sydney's Northern Beaches. The depot is owned by Transport for NSW, and is operated by Keolis Downer Northern Beaches as part of the Region 8 contract.

It is the largest bus depot on the Northern Beaches and one of the largest bus depots in Sydney.

== History ==
Following the closure of the Manly tram network in 1939, all Northern Beaches buses had been stabled at the increasingly overcrowded former Manly Tram Depot. To alleviate this, a new depot opened on 5 October 1952 on Pittwater Road, Brookvale.

As of May 2026, it has an allocation of 251 buses. In October 2021 it was included in the transfer of region 8 from State Transit to Keolis Downer Northern Beaches.

== Electrification ==
In mid-2024, Transport for NSW commenced the conversion of Brookvale Bus Depot to support battery-electric buses under the state's Zero Emission Buses Program. The project involves upgrading the depot's electrical infrastructure and installing fast-charging technology, including gantry-mounted pantograph chargers and plug-in chargers to accommodate approximately 229 electric buses. As of late 2025, 13 pantograph chargers, and 10 plug-in chargers have been installed. The depot's diesel fleet is expected to be progressively replaced with battery-electric buses by 2028 as part of the Zero Emissions Bus program.
