= Willoughby Bus Depot =

Bus depot

- Interactive map of Willoughby Bus Depot

Location
- Location: Cnr Ann & Stan Streets, Willoughby
- Coordinates: 33°47′53″S 151°12′14″E

Characteristics
- Owner: Transport for NSW
- Operator: Busways
- Depot code: M

History
- Opened: 1 July 1958

Willoughby Bus Depot is a bus depot in the Sydney suburb of Willoughby operated by Busways.

== History ==
Willoughby Bus Depot opened on 1 July 1958 on the site of a former tannery. It operated routes, which were a combination of tram replacement routes and existing services operated by North Sydney Bus Depot.

In January 2022 it was included in the transfer of Region 7 from State Transit to Busways.

In 2023, the bus depot was planned to be converted to electric charging technology to accommodate a new fleet of electric buses as part of the Zero Emission Buses Program.

As of September 2026, it has an allocation of 123 buses.
