= Mona Vale Bus Depot =

Vehicle maintenance facility in Sydney, New South Wales, Australia

- Interactive map of Mona Vale Bus Depot

Location
- Location: Darley Street, Mona Vale
- Coordinates: 33°40′28″S 151°18′27″E

Characteristics
- Owner: Transport for NSW
- Operator: Keolis Downer Northern Beaches
- Depot code: F

History
- Opened: 26 January 1970

Mona Vale Bus Depot is a bus depot in the Sydney suburb of Mona Vale operated by Keolis Downer Northern Beaches.

== History ==
Mona Vale Bus Depot opened on 26 January 1970. It took over most of the routes north of Narrabeen from Brookvale Bus Depot. In October 2021 it was included in the transfer of region 8 from State Transit to Keolis Downer Northern Beaches.

As of May 2026, it has an allocation of 130 buses.
