= Manly Tram Depot =

Section of Sydney tram network in Australia

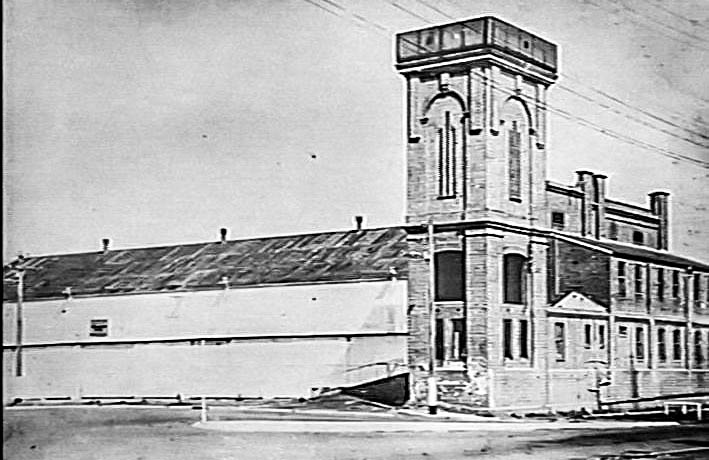
- Interactive map of Manly Tram Depot

Location
- Location: Cnr Balgowlah & Pittwater Roads, Manly
- Coordinates: 33°47′13″S 151°16′53″E

Characteristics
- Operator: New South Wales Tramways

History
- Opened: 1903
- Closed: 30 September 1939

Manly Tram Depot was part of the Sydney tram network.

== History ==
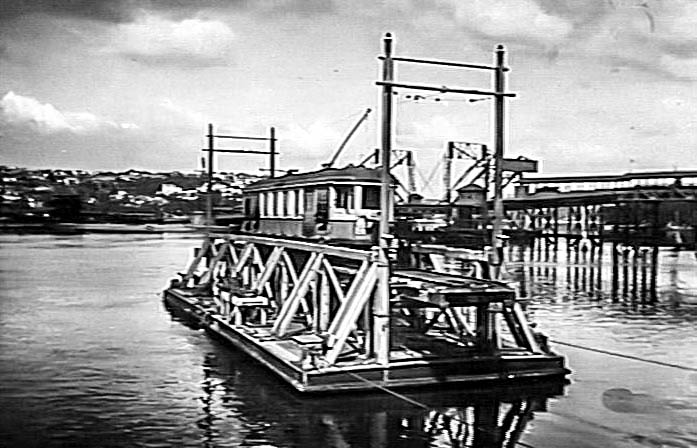
Tram crossing The Spit on a punt

Manly Depot served the isolated Manly lines. It opened in 1903, being rebuilt in 1911 for electric trams. It closed as a tram depot, along with the network on 30 September 1939. The shed continued to be used as a bus depot, and in 1947 the remaining steam tram sheds were demolished, while the electric tram sheds were modified for use as a bus depot and subsequently adapted for commercial use being a car dealership and later retail markets.

== Design ==
The depot had a steel frame with a saw tooth roof covering five roads with the tramcars having to enter the new shed through the old steam tram sheds, which were timber framed and clad in corrugated iron. Design included:

- 5 tracks
- Curtailed parapet
- East facade altered, north and south elevations reclad
- Roof orientation to south
- Traffic Office building at the East end of the property

== Operations ==
The depot served the isolated Manly lines with services to Harbord, Narrabeen and The Spit.

== Gallery ==
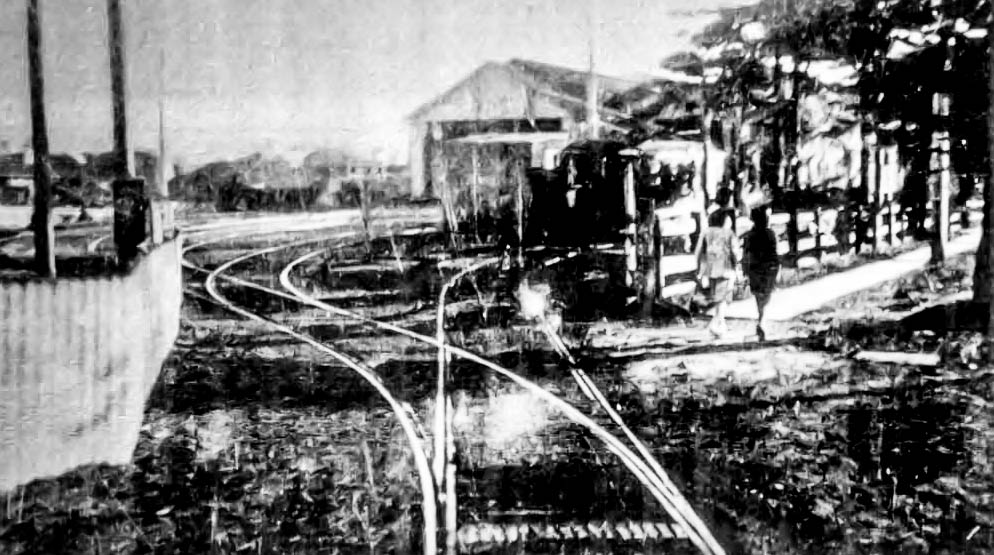
Depot c.1920

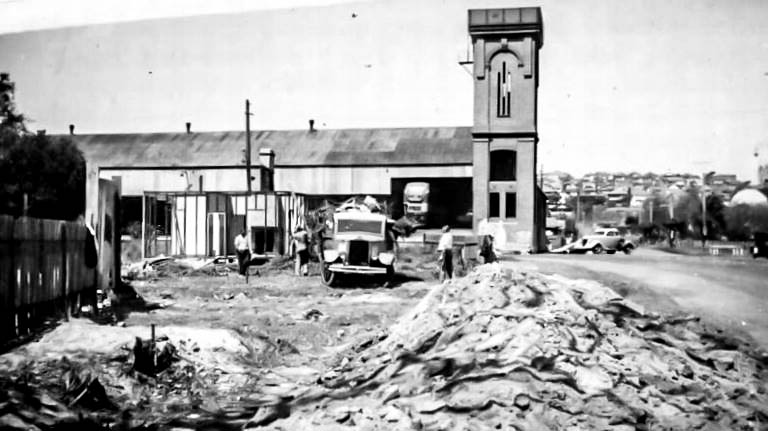
Depot c.1941

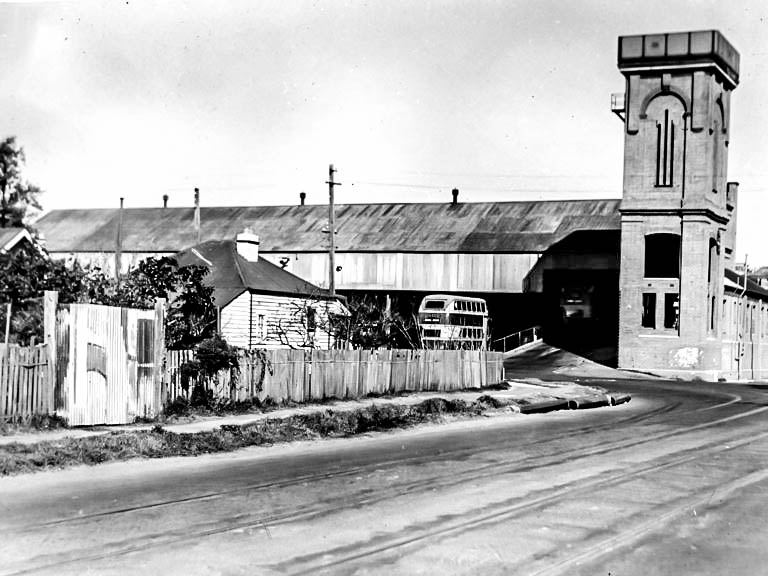
Depot c.1941

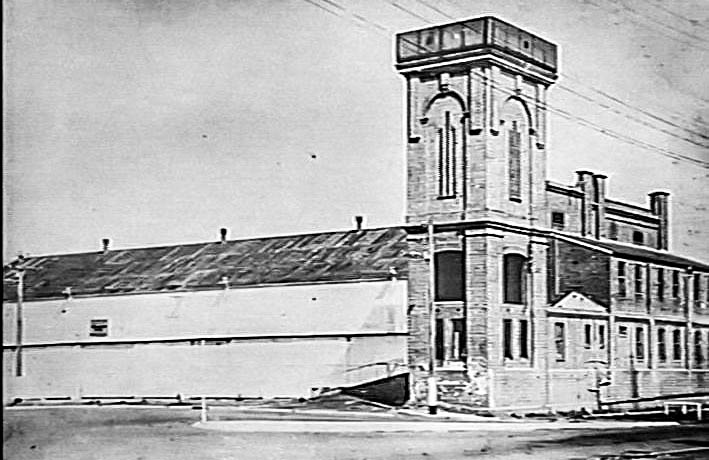
Depot c.1959

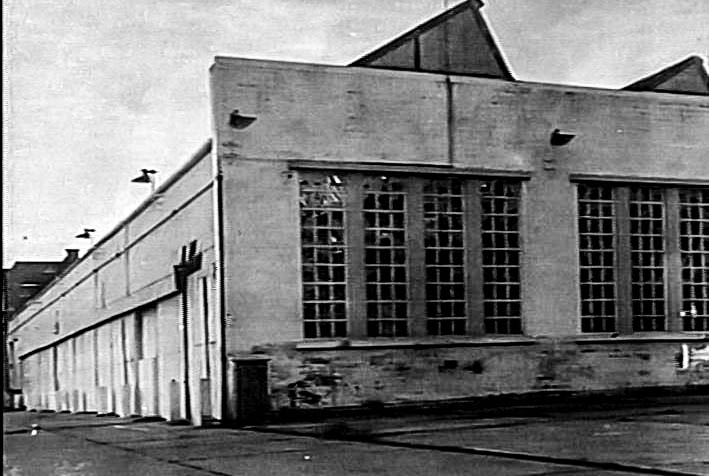
Manly Tramway Depot

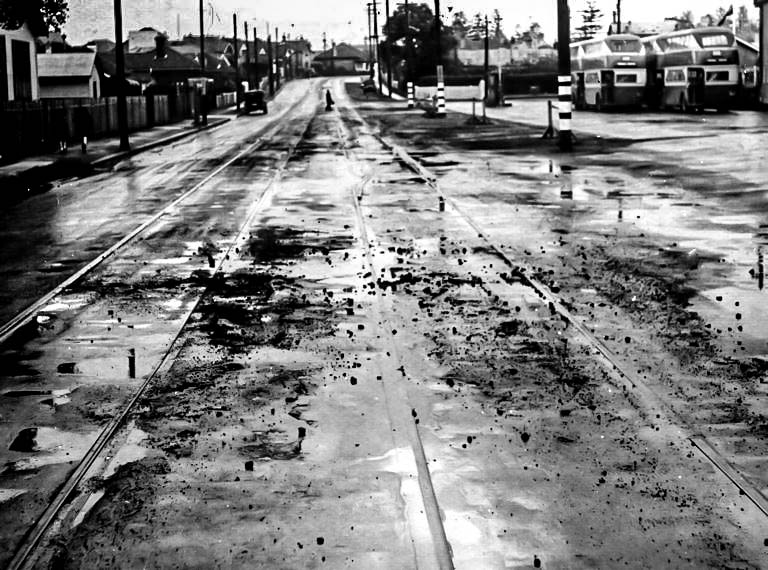
Pittwater Road c.1940

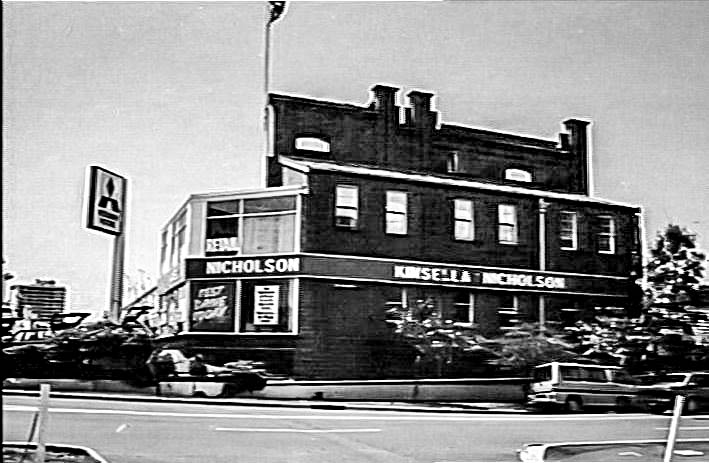
Depot becomes Mitsubishi Motors Dealer
