= North Sydney Bus Depot =

- Interactive map of North Sydney Bus Depot

Location
- Location: Ernest Street, Neutral Bay
- Coordinates: 33°49′44″S 151°13′07″E

Characteristics
- Owner: Keolis Downer
- Operator: Keolis Downer Northern Beaches
- Depot code: N

History
- Opened: 3 June 1909

North Sydney Bus Depot is a bus depot in the Sydney suburb of Neutral Bay operated by Keolis Downer Northern Beaches.

== History ==
On 3 June 1909, the North Sydney Tram Depot opened to replace the Ridge Street Tram Depot. On 15 September 1940, a bus depot opened on the adjacent site. With the closure of the North Sydney tram network in June 1958 and the opening of Willoughby Bus Depot in July 1958, the tram depot closed and sold for redevelopment as the Big Bear Shopping Centre, while the bus depot was downgraded to a satellite depot. In October 2021 it was included in the transfer of region 8 from State Transit to Keolis Downer Northern Beaches.

As of September 2026, it has an allocation of 63 buses.
