= Keolis Northern Beaches =

Australian bus operator

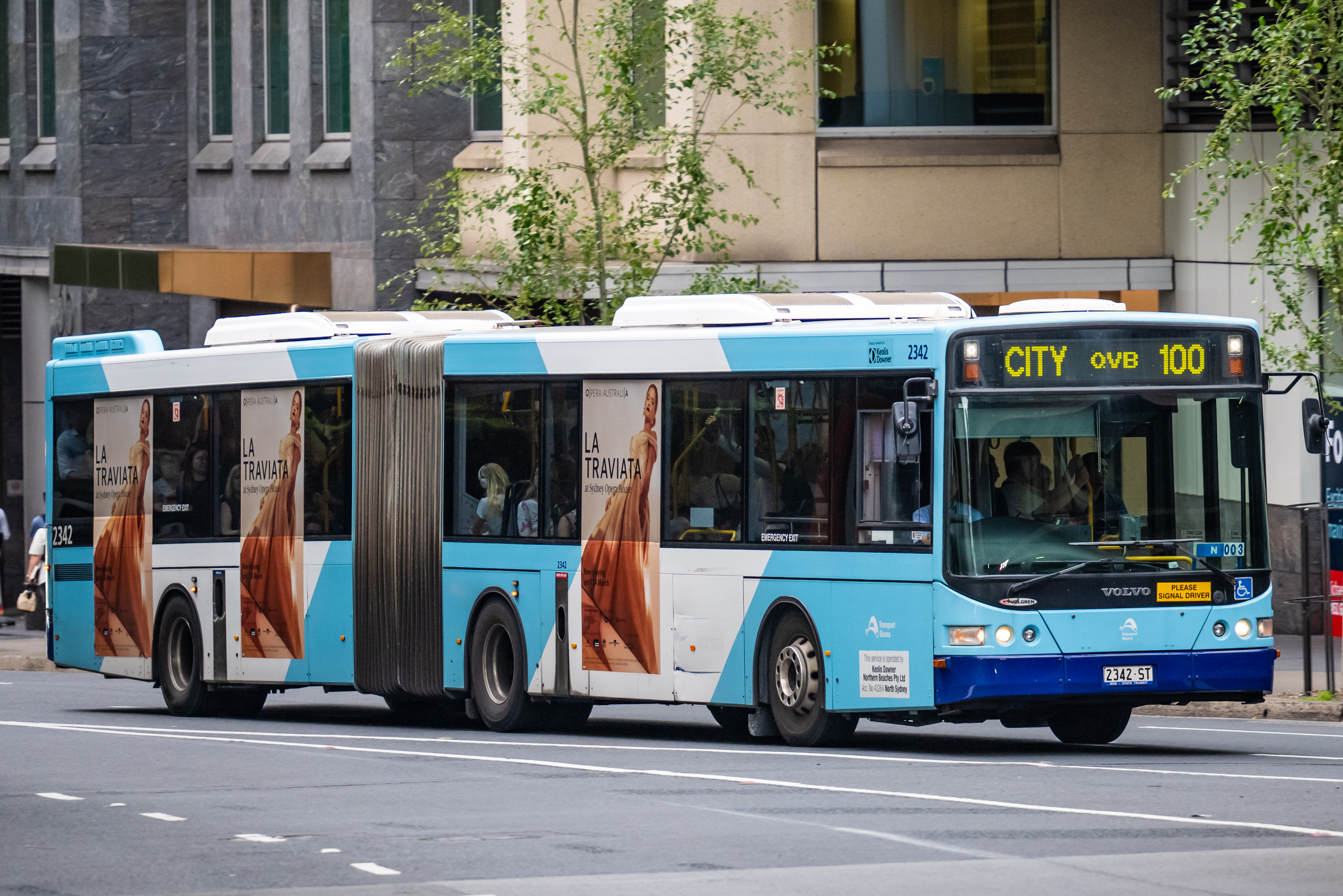
- Volgren bodied Volvo B12BLEA on Clarence Street in February 2024
- Parent: Keolis Australia
- Commenced operation: 31 October 2021
- Headquarters: Brookvale Bus Depot
- Locale: Sydney
- Service area: Lower North Shore; Northern Beaches
- Service type: Bus operator
- Depots: 3
- Fleet: 431 buses (October 2026)
- Website: www.kdnorthernbeaches.com.au

Keolis Northern Beaches is a bus operator in Sydney, Australia. A subsidiary of Keolis Australia, it operates services in Sydney Bus Region 8 on the Lower North Shore and Northern Beaches under contract to Transport for NSW. Its headquarters are located at Brookvale Bus Depot.

Established as Keolis Downer Northern Beaches in 2021, the operator took over services previously run by State Transit. Its network includes the B-Line and Keoride on-demand services. Its operation of Region 8 has been affected by driver and vehicle shortages, service cancellations and overcrowding.

== History ==
In October 2019, the Government of New South Wales announced that the bus operations of State Transit were to be contracted out to the private sector. In May 2021, Keolis Downer was awarded the contract to operate Sydney Bus Region 8. Keolis Downer Northern Beaches (KDNB) commenced operating on 31 October 2021 with its contract to run for eight years.

The operation and maintenance contract was valued at $900 million and initially provided for the introduction of 125 electric buses. Nearly 900 employees transferred to the new operator, while the state government retained ownership of the buses and depots.

Keolis Downer had already operated the Keoride on-demand service on the Northern Beaches since a pilot began on 4 November 2017. Keoride became a permanent part of the public transport network on 31 October 2021, alongside the Region 8 takeover.

On 1 December 2025, Keolis completed the acquisition of Downer's 49% interest in the Keolis Downer joint venture, following an agreement announced in July that year. In March 2026, Keolis announced that its Australian operations would operate under the Keolis brand.

== Operations ==
The operator provides regular bus services on the Northern Beaches and Lower North Shore, including the B-Line, as well as Keoride on-demand transport. Keoride allows passengers to book journeys to nearby hubs and the B-Line through an app, which directs them to virtual bus stops. In November 2021, the operator announced four additional wheelchair-accessible vehicles.

Network changes introduced by Transport for NSW on 19 January 2025 included more frequent services on routes 100 and 230, a westbound diversion of route 114 via the Pacific Highway to serve Crows Nest Metro station, and all-night operation of route 144 between Manly and Chatswood, replacing route 144N.

== Service performance ==
=== Staffing and service reductions ===
In March 2023, ABC News reported that Keolis Downer Northern Beaches had 90 full-time driver vacancies. The company said that 49 drivers had started work that year. A reduced timetable introduced on 17 July 2023 removed 182 of 3,863 daily weekday services, or 4.7%, while retaining peak-period B-Line services. The operator said Transport for NSW had instructed it to reduce the timetable temporarily to limit unpredictable cancellations during the driver shortage.

In April 2026, the NSW Government announced the recruitment of 17 drivers from New Zealand, with airfares and six weeks of accommodation funded by Transport for NSW. The government identified high local housing costs as an obstacle to recruitment. On 2 June 2026, members of the Rail, Tram and Bus Union began protected industrial action by wearing casual clothes instead of uniforms during enterprise bargaining. The union argued that pay and conditions contributed to staff shortages; Keolis said it was negotiating in good faith and that its offer reflected the operating contract.

=== Vehicle availability and passenger experience ===
In March 2025, managing director Mark Dunlop apologised for disruption following the withdrawal of 43 articulated buses for structural repairs. He also attributed reduced B-Line vehicle availability to higher-than-planned mileage and maintenance requirements. By 3 September 2025, 17 repaired articulated buses had returned to Northern Beaches services.

Local reporting described overcrowding and passengers being unable to board. In February 2025, Mosman Collective reported accounts from Lower North Shore commuters and parents of long queues, full buses passing stops and students arriving late for school. One parent said their child had been unable to board route 230 on at least five occasions in seven days.

=== Reported performance ===
A ministerial answer to the NSW Parliament recorded 26,424 cancelled services out of 546,227 scheduled services in Region 8 between January and June 2023, approximately 4.8%.

For August 2024 to January 2025, a subsequent parliamentary answer reported monthly cancellation-at-start rates of 1.0% to 2.0% for the months with available data. Transport for NSW received between 221 and 525 complaints about Region 8 per month over the six-month period. November's punctuality and cancellation figures were unavailable because of technical issues.

Transport for NSW publishes monthly on-time running results for metropolitan bus contracts. Its Region 8 dashboard recorded monthly results below the 95% target in 12 of the 13 months from August 2025 to August 2026. Results ranged from 92.6% in February 2026 to 95.7% in January 2026; the August 2026 result was 93.8%.

== Fleet ==
As of October 2026, Australian Bus Fleet Lists recorded 431 buses at the operator's three depots: 241 at Brookvale, 127 at Mona Vale and 63 at North Sydney. The listed fleet included diesel single-deck, articulated and double-deck buses, battery-electric buses and four Hino Poncho vehicles used for Keoride.

In March 2025, the NSW Government announced the purchase of 50 articulated buses and ten double-deck buses for the Northern Beaches to address vehicle shortages. In October 2026, the fleet list classified ten Volvo B8L double-deckers as awaiting delivery or preparation for service.

The listed current fleet is shown below. Years refer to manufacture, rather than entry into service with the operator.

Chassis	Body	Picture	Year	Easy Access	Number	Notes
Volvo B12BLE Euro 3	Custom Coaches CB60		2004/05	✓	4	ex State Transit Authority
Volvo B12BLE Euro 3	Volgren CR228L		2004/05	✓	9	ex State Transit Authority
Volvo B12BLEA Euro 3	Custom Coaches CB60	Sydney_Buses_(mo_1687)_Custom_Coaches_'CB60'_bodied_Volvo_B12BLEA_at_Railway_Square	2005/6	✓	43	ex State Transit Authority
Volvo B12BLE Euro 5	Custom Coaches CB60 Evo II		2007–2011	✓	73	ex State Transit Authority ex Transit Systems
Volvo B12BLEA Euro 5	Volgren CR228L		2010/11	✓	14	ex State Transit Authority ex Transit Systems
Volvo B7RLE	Custom Coaches CB80		2011–2013	✓	32	ex State Transit Authority
Iveco Metro	Volgren Optimus		2014/15	✓	7	ex State Transit Authority
Scania K310UB	Bustech VST		2016	✓	16	ex State Transit Authority ex Transit Systems
MAN ND323F	Gemilang Coachworks Eco Double-Decker		2017, 2018, 2020	✓	42	ex State Transit Authority ex CDC NSW
Bustech CDi (Cummins ISL)	Bustech CDi		2017	✓	6	ex Transdev NSW ex U-Go Mobility
Hino Poncho HX	Hino		2021	✓	4	Used for Keoride On Demand services only.
Custom Denning Element 2	Custom Denning		2024–2025	✓	83	Part of Zero Emission Buses Program
Yutong ZK6131HG1	Yutong E12		2025–2026	✓	78	Part of Zero Emission Buses Program
Foton BJ6129EVCA	Foton C12	Keolis Northern Beaches Foton C12 bus on Route 150X to Manly	2025	✓	19	Part of Zero Emission Buses Program

=== Former fleet ===
The following types have been withdrawn from the operator's fleet.

Chassis	Body	Picture	Year	Easy Access	Number	Notes
Volvo B10BLE	APG / Phoenix Orana		1998–2000	✓	44 (All retired by Jan 2026)	ex State Transit Authority ex Transdev John Holland ex Transit Systems
Scania K280UB	Bustech VST		2013	✓	1 Transferred back to: Transit Systems West (Kingsgrove)	ex Transit Systems
Scania K280UB	Custom CB80		2011-2012	✓	5 Transferred back to: Transit Systems West (Kingsgrove)	ex Transit Systems
Scania K310UB	Volgren Optimus		2018	✓	9 Transferred to: Transit Systems West (Kingsgrove)	ex State Transit Authority ex Transit Systems
Volvo B8RLE	Bustech VST		2019	✓	19 Transferred to: CDC NSW R4 (Rouse Hill) CDC NSW R14 (Terrey Hills, Mt Kuring-gai) Transit Systems West (Burwood)	ex State Transit Authority
Scania K310UB	Custom Bus CB80		2017–2018	✓	5 Transferred to: Transit Systems West (Kingsgrove)	ex State Transit Authority ex Transit Systems
Volvo B7RLE	Bustech VST		2015	✓	19 Transferred to: CDC NSW R4 (Rouse Hill) CDC NSW R14 (Terrey Hills, Mt Kuring-gai) Transit Systems West (Burwood) Transit Systems NSW (Smithfield)	ex State Transit Authority

== Depots ==
Keolis Northern Beaches operates three depots: Brookvale (V), Mona Vale (F) and North Sydney (N).

In September 2025, the NSW Government announced completion of a $25 million electrification upgrade at Brookvale, comprising 13 overhead pantograph chargers and ten plug-in chargers, with capacity to support 229 electric buses. Thirteen electric buses were then operating from the depot; conversion of its entire fleet was planned by 2028.
