= Transdev John Holland =

Australian bus company

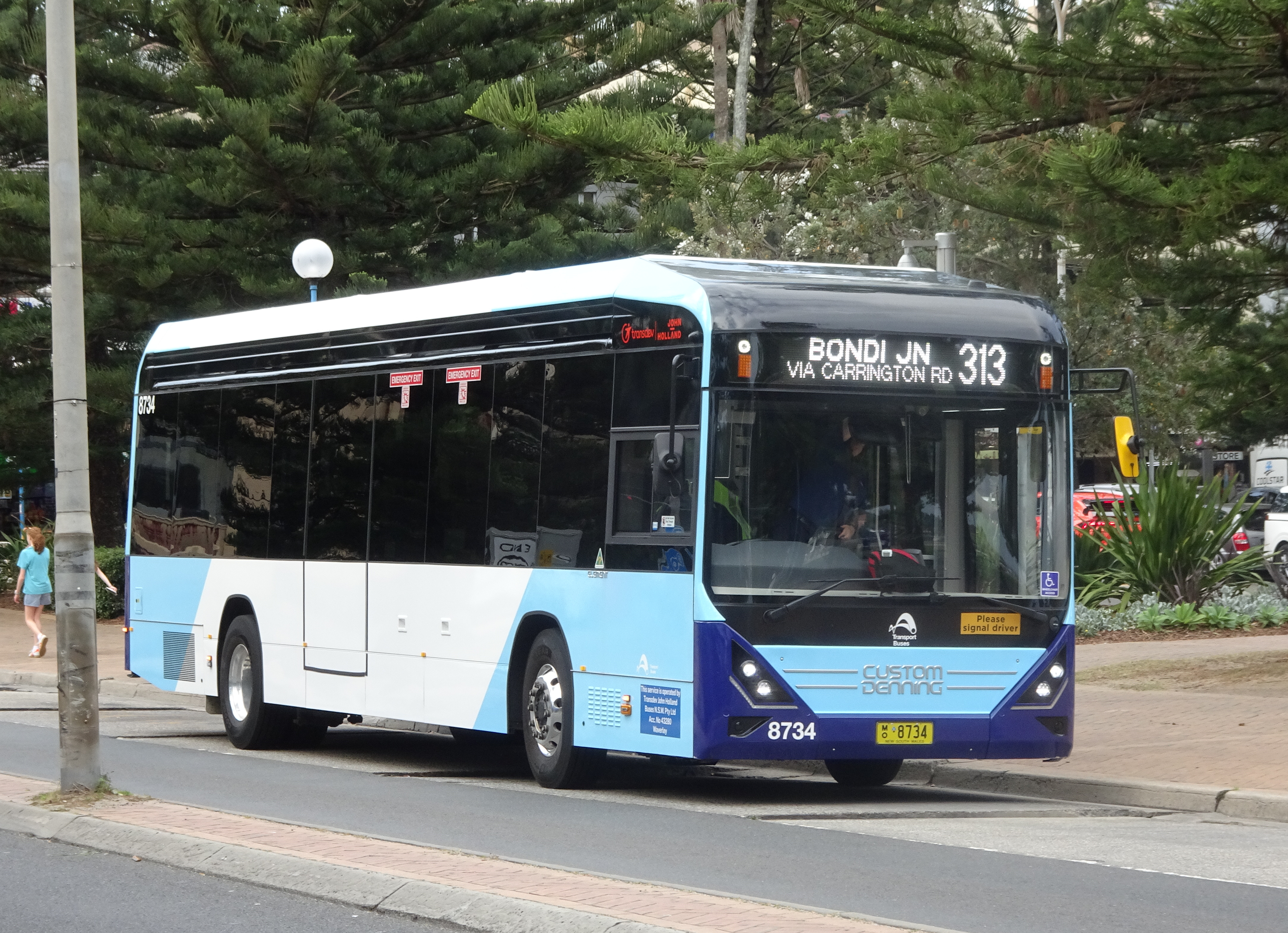
- Custom Denning Element at Coogee
- Parent: Transdev (75%); John Holland (25%)
- Commenced operation: 3 April 2022; 4 years ago
- Locale: Sydney
- Service area: Eastern Suburbs
- Service type: Bus operator
- Depots: 3
- Fleet: 472 (July 2026)
- Chief executive: Rachel Spencer
- Website: transdevjohnholland.com.au

Transdev John Holland Buses is a bus operator in Sydney, Australia. A joint venture between Transdev and John Holland, it operates services in Sydney Bus Region 9 in the Eastern Suburbs under contract to Transport for NSW. It is a separate company to the former Transdev NSW, wholly owned by Transdev, which operated buses in other regions of Sydney prior to August 2023.

Yarra Journey Makers, another Transdev and John Holland joint venture, operates the Yarra Trams network in Melbourne since December 2024.

== History ==
In October 2019, the New South Wales state government announced that the bus operations of State Transit were to be contracted out to the private sector. In November 2021, the contract was awarded to Transdev John Holland Buses (TJHB) with operations to commence on 3 April 2022.

== Fleet ==
As of July 2026, the fleet consists of 472 buses, including 25 electric buses.

Transdev John Holland Buses inherited a fleet of 474 buses from the STA, which included Volvo B12BLEs, Mercedes-Benz O500LEs, Volvo B12BLEAs, Scania K310UBs, Scania K280UBs, Volvo B8RLEs and Custom Denning Elements.

The current fleet is located below:

Chassis	Body	Picture	Year	Number	Fuel	Notes	Easy Access
Volvo B12BLEA Euro 3	Custom Coaches CB60		2005–2006	12	Diesel	ex State Transit Authority	✓
Volvo B12BLE Euro 3	Custom Coaches CB60		2005–2007	7	Diesel	ex State Transit Authority ex Keolis	✓
Volvo B12BLE Euro 5	Custom Coaches CB60 Evo II		2006-2010	71	Diesel	ex State Transit Authority ex Keolis	✓
Mercedes-Benz O500LE CNG	Custom Coaches CB60 Evo II		2007-2011	79	CNG	ex State Transit Authority ex Transit Systems	✓
Scania K310UB 14.5m	Volgren CR228L		2008	1	Diesel	ex State Transit Authority	✓
Mercedes-Benz O500LE Euro 5	Custom Bus CB80		2009	1	Diesel	ex State Transit Authority Supplied by Mercedes-Benz Australia as a replacement unit for O500LE CNG unit 4878 destroyed in a fire at Hillsdale 29/7/11.	✓
Mercedes-Benz O500LE Euro 5	Custom Coaches CB60 Evo II		2009-2010	20	Diesel	ex State Transit Authority	✓
Volvo B12BLEA Euro 5	Volgren CR228L		2010-2011	79	Diesel	ex State Transit Authority ex Transit Systems	✓
Scania K280UB	Bustech VST		2010-2011	28	Diesel	ex State Transit Authority	✓
Scania K280UB	Custom Bus CB80		2013	8	Diesel	ex State Transit Authority	✓
Scania K280UB	Bustech VSTM		2014	27	Diesel	ex State Transit Authority	✓
Scania K310UB	Bustech VST		2016	14	Diesel	ex State Transit Authority	✓
Volvo B8RLE	Volgren Optimus		2018-2019	29	Diesel	ex State Transit Authority	✓
Scania K310UB	Custom Bus CB80		2018-2019	38	Diesel	ex State Transit Authority	✓
Volvo B8RLE	Bustech VST		2019-2020	27	Diesel	ex State Transit Authority	✓
Custom Denning Element	Custom Denning		2021-2023	19	Battery Electric	ex State Transit Authority ex Transit Systems ex Busways	✓
Custom Denning Element 2	Custom Denning		2024-present	6	Battery Electric		✓
Scania K360CA	Volgren Optimus		2026	37	Diesel	Part of a delivery of 50 articulated buses to Sydney. The remaining 13 were delivered to Busways Region 7.	✓

=== Former fleet ===
Chassis	Body	Picture	Year	Number	Fuel	Notes	Easy Access
Volvo B10BLE	Orana		1997-1998	7	Diesel	ex State Transit Authority All transferred to Keolis Downer then withdrawn in 2025-2026	✓

== Depots ==
Transdev John Holland Buses operate out of three depots, these are:

- Port Botany (P)
- Randwick (R)
- Waverley (W)

== See also ==
- Yarra Trams – the Melbourne tram network operated by Yarra Journey Makers, another joint venture between Transdev and John Holland
- Transdev NSW – another Transdev bus operation in Sydney
