= Ridge Street Tram Depot =

Former Sydney tram depot

- North Shore Tram System
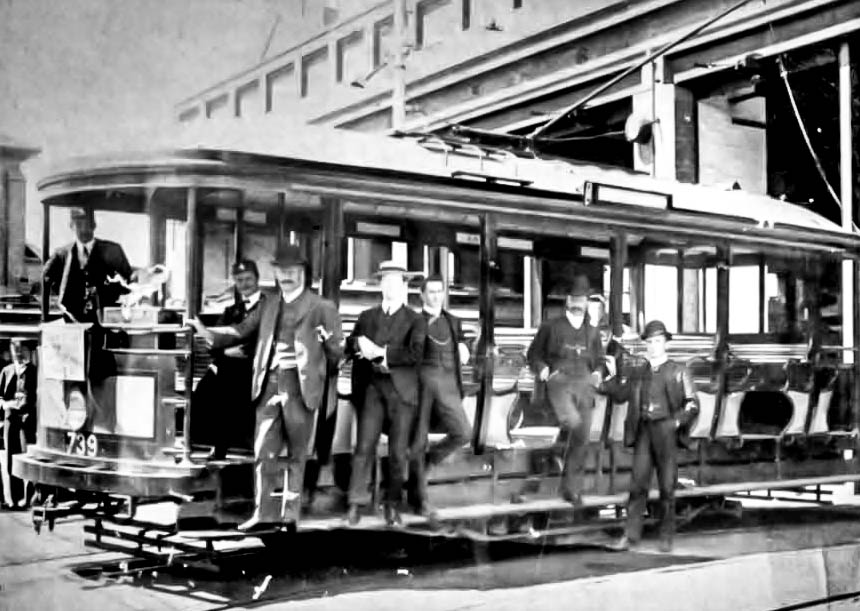

Operation
- Locale: Cnr Ridge & Miller Sts, North Sydney
- Open: 1886
- Close: 3 June 1909
- Operator: New South Wales Tramways

Infrastructure
- Track gauge: 4 ft 8 1/2 in (1,435 mm) standard gauge
- Depot: Ridge Street Tram Depot

Ridge Street Tram Depot was part of the Sydney tram network.

== History ==
Ridge Street Depot was originally a cable tram depot and winding engine house that opened in 1886. On the conversion to electric operation the depot was extensively rebuilt in 1902 to enlarge the tram shed to twelve roads.

The depot closed on 3 June 1909, replaced by North Sydney Depot.

The old cable shed and winding engine house was demolished and the carriage sheds converted to a cinema (now the Independent Theatre) while the electric tram sheds were closed in 1909 and converted into the North Sydney Coliseum Roller Rink which became the Sydnian Theatre of Pictures in 1913 and reverting to the name Coliseum in 1915 .The Coliseum Theatre (Biograph) next door became a Vaudeville theatre six months after opening and remains a 'live' venue to the present day.

== Design ==
The front elevation of the shed had a parapet with recessed panels. Design included:

- 12 tracks
- Panelled front parapet

== Operations ==
The original cable depot served a short cable line to the Milsons Point ferry wharf. A typical cable tram consisted of two vehicles, a leading open tramcar, known as the "dummy" or "grip" car, and a second car that was an enclosed saloon tram or trailer.

The system was powered by a large steam winding engine in Ridge Street. The engine's flywheel hauled an endless steel cable lying beneath the road between the rails in a shallow channel along the tram route. Cable trams were replaced by electric trams in 1902 and the new electric depot served the isolated North Shore Lines.
