= Port Botany Bus Depot =

Bus depot in Sydney

- Interactive map of Port Botany Bus Depot

Location
- Location: Bumborah Point Road, Port Botany
- Coordinates: 33°58′08″S 151°13′33″E

Characteristics
- Owner: Transport for NSW
- Operator: Transdev John Holland
- Depot code: P

Port Botany Bus Depot is a bus depot in the Sydney suburb of Port Botany operated by Transdev John Holland.

== History ==
On 8 May 1951 a new depot opened on the corner of Bunnerong Road and Wentworth Avenue, Pagewood. In the mid-1980s, the depot was relocated to a new site on Bumborah Point Road, Port Botany with the Pagewood site redeveloped as Westfield Eastgardens.

As part of the contracting out of Sydney Bus Region 9, operation of Port Botany depot passed from State Transit to Transdev John Holland on 2 April 2022.

As of February 2026, it has an allocation of 168 buses.
