= Randwick Bus Depot =

Bus depot in the Sydney suburb of Randwick

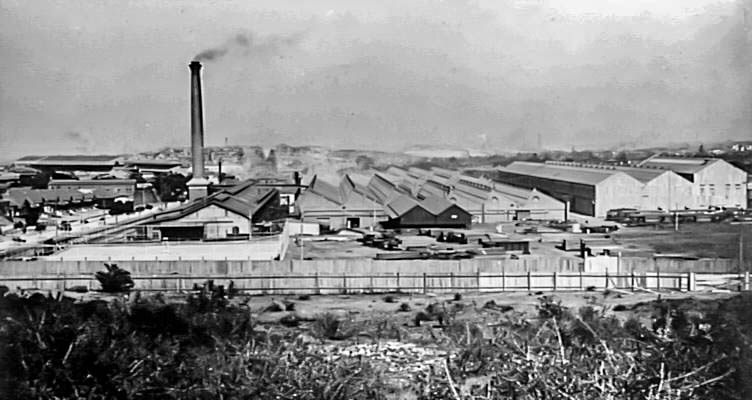
- Interactive map of Randwick Bus Depot

Location
- Location: Cnr Darley Rd & King St Randwick
- Coordinates: 33°54′22″S 151°14′10″E

Characteristics
- Owner: Transport for NSW
- Operator: Transdev John Holland
- Depot code: R

History
- Opened: 1881

Randwick Bus Depot is a bus depot in the Sydney suburb of Randwick operated by Transdev John Holland.

== History ==
In 1881 the Randwick Tramway Workshops were established on the corner of Darley Road and King Street, Randwick as the main workshops for the Sydney tram network. It also had a depot attached. In 1902 the workshops were renamed the Randwick Tramway Workshops.

The workshops grew rapidly to become one of Sydney's largest engineering establishments peaking in the 1920s. They performed all heavy maintenance on the fleet. Randwick Workshops were also instrumental for the construction of the L and LP classes that were completely rebuilt from the F class. O/P class, The PR and 2 of the PR1 classes were all converted by Randwick workshops out of trams that had been involved either in accidents or required major overhaul.

During World War I and World War II workers from the Tramways Workshops were diverted to manufacturing armaments and artillery. The 1917 General Strike began with the 3,000 workers from Eveleigh Railway and Randwick Tramways Workshops and spread across Australia to become one of the largest strikes in Australian history.

With the gradual closure of the Sydney tram network in the late 1950s, the need for the workshops declined and they closed in 1960. It then became a storage place for withdrawn trams prior to them either being used as outdoor buildings or being burnt on "Burning Hill". Tram 1979 was the last tram to leave Randwick Workshops in 1971, 10 years after the final closure of the Sydney system and is restored and running at the Sydney Tramway Museum.

The western side was redeveloped and today is part of the University of New South Wales and Randwick TAFE. The eastern end remains in use as a bus depot.

As part of the contracting out of Sydney Bus Region 9, operation of Randwick depot passed from State Transit to Transdev John Holland on 2 April 2022.

As of February 2026, it has an allocation of 135 buses.

== Operations ==
The Randwick Tramway Workshops consisted of:

- Traverser
- Bogie and Pattern Store
- Electric Mains Store
- Overhead Equipment
- Machine Shop
- Paint Shop
- Woodworking and Car Body Repairs
- Blacksmith, Boiler and Welding Shop
- Bus Maintenance Garage
- Car Overhaul and Repairs
- Canteen

== Gallery ==
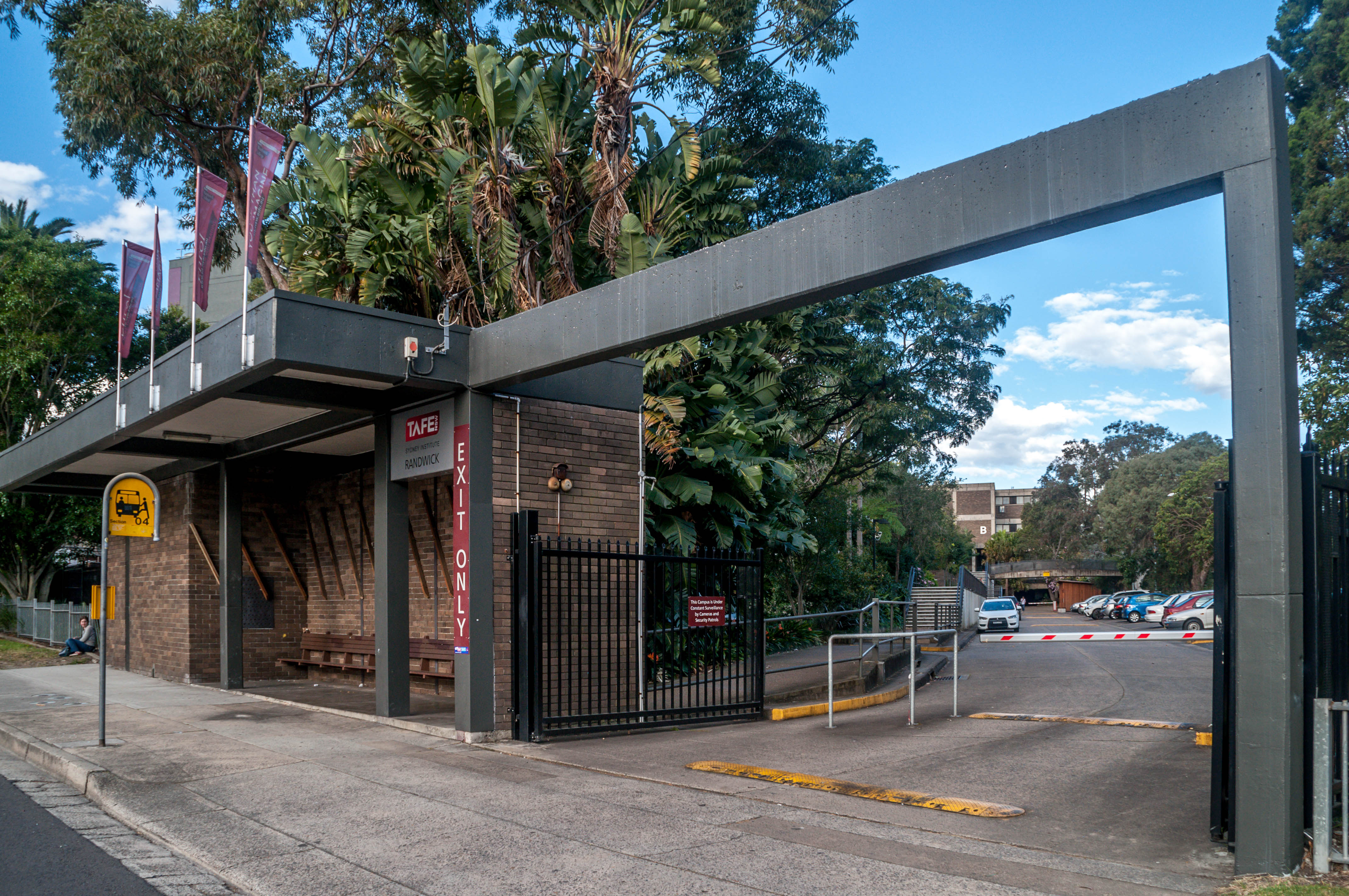
Tram Road Entrance

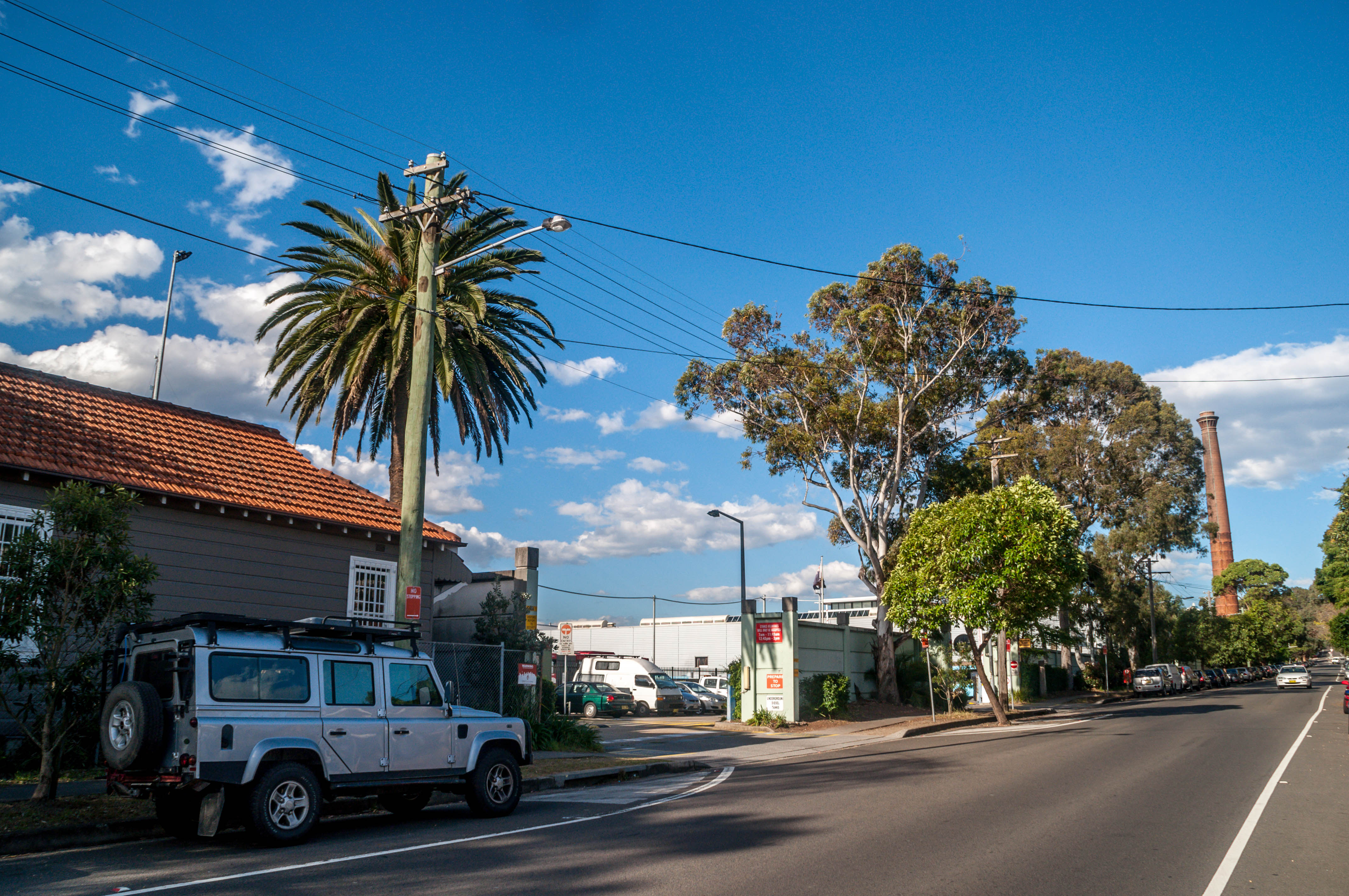
Machine Shop Site

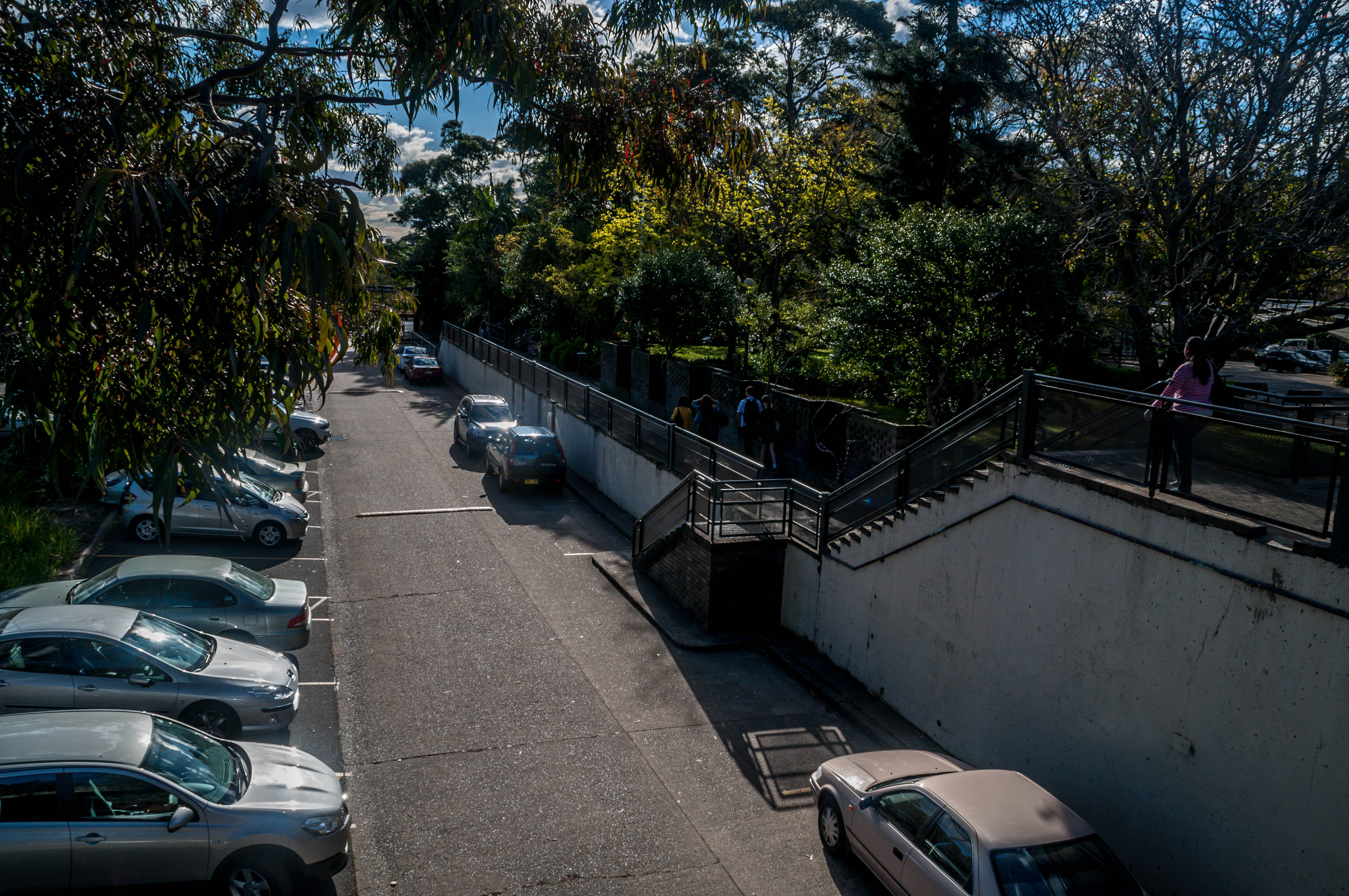
Tram Road

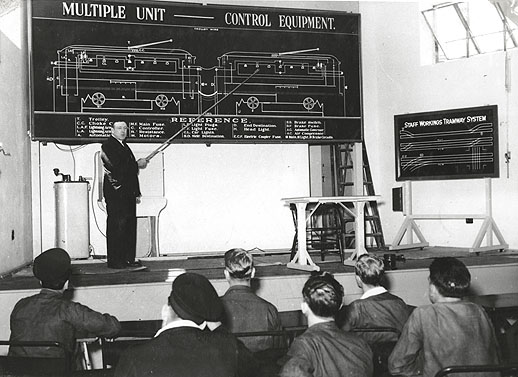
Training

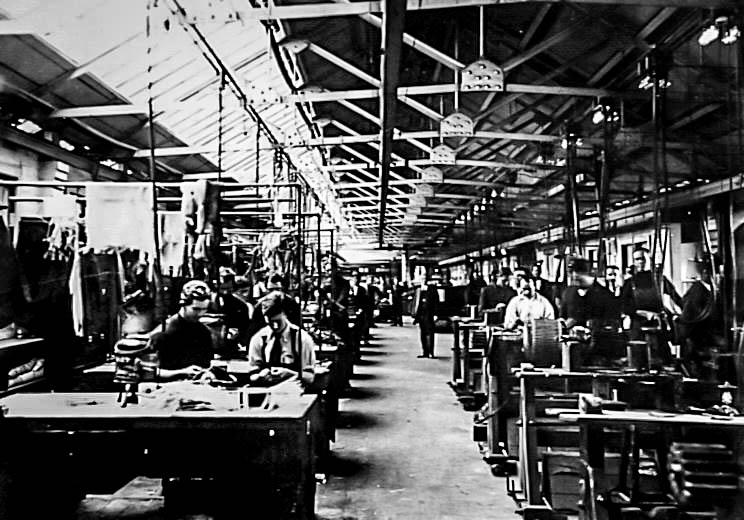
Armature winding shop 1926

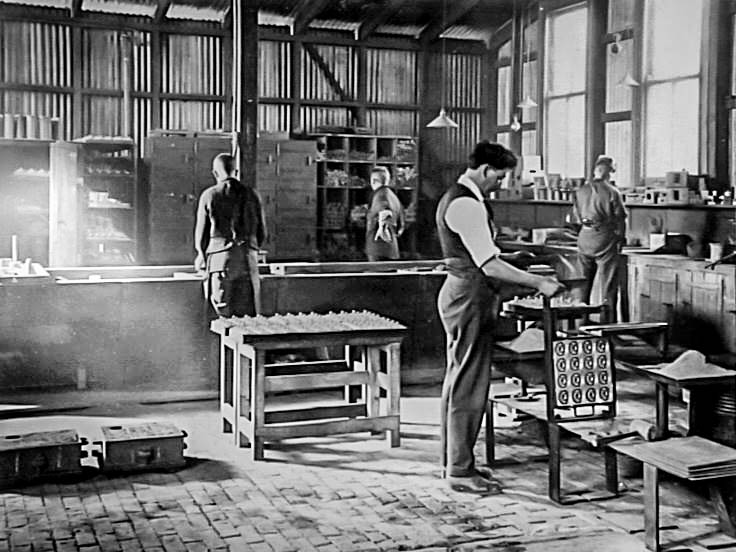
Core making workshop

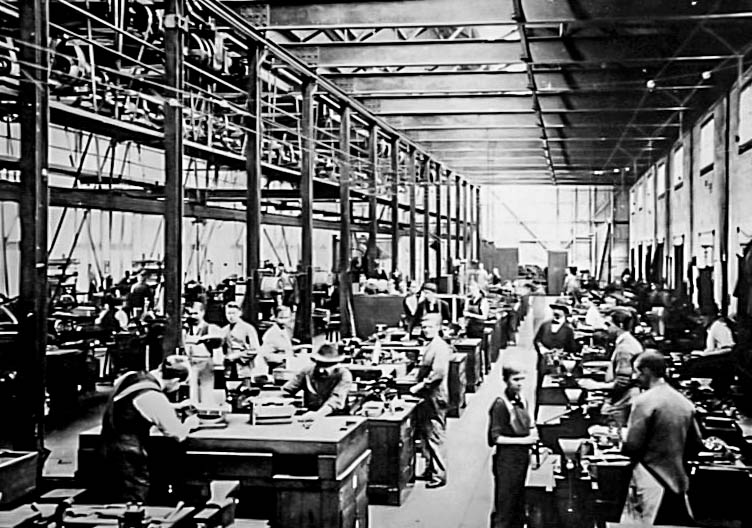
Electrical fitting shop

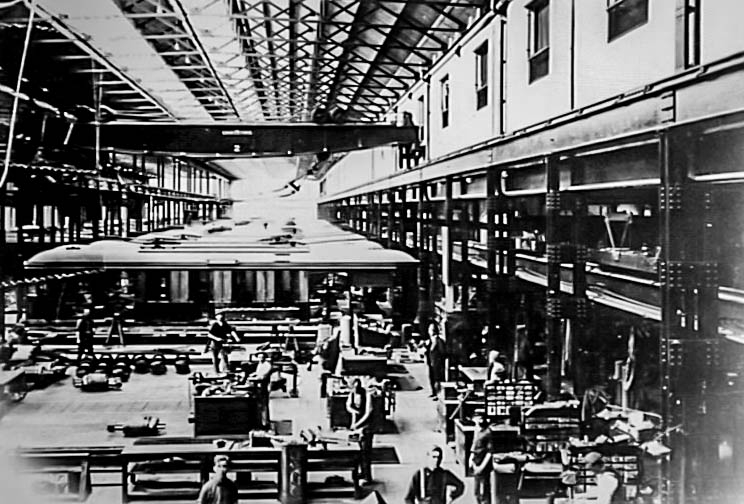
Electrical repair shop

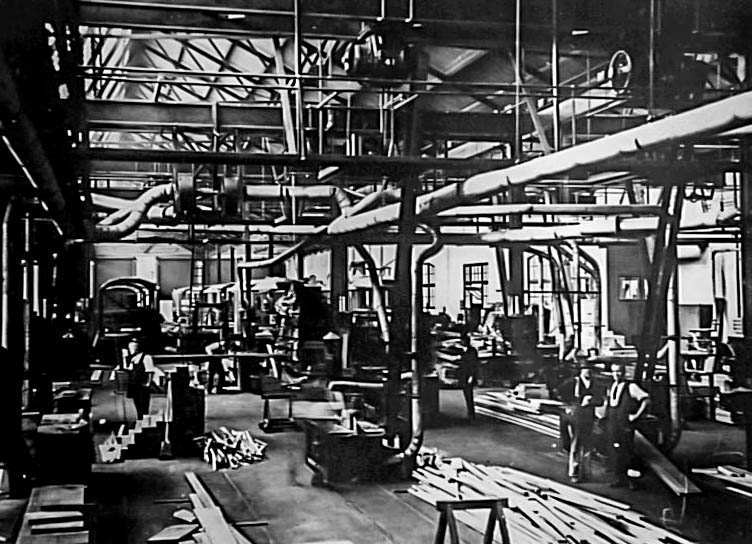
Woodworking shop

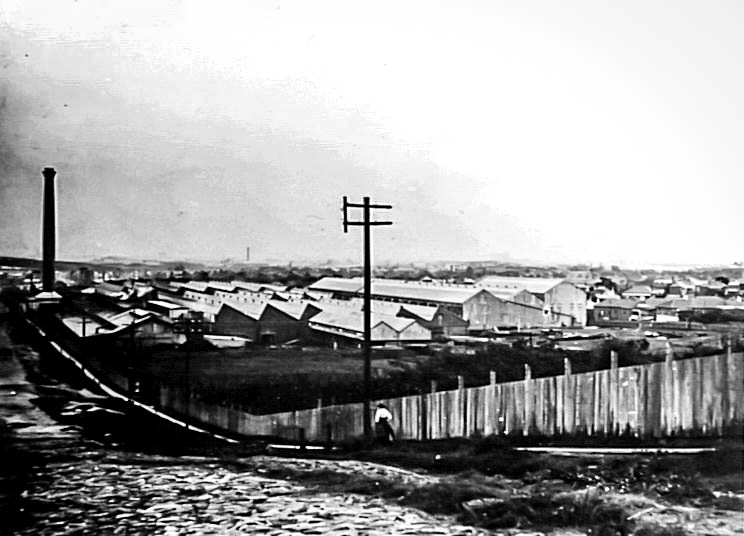
General view

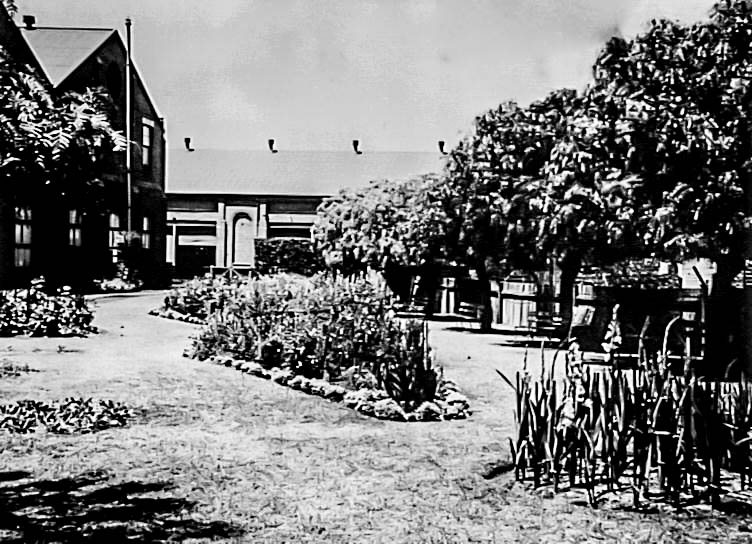
Gardens

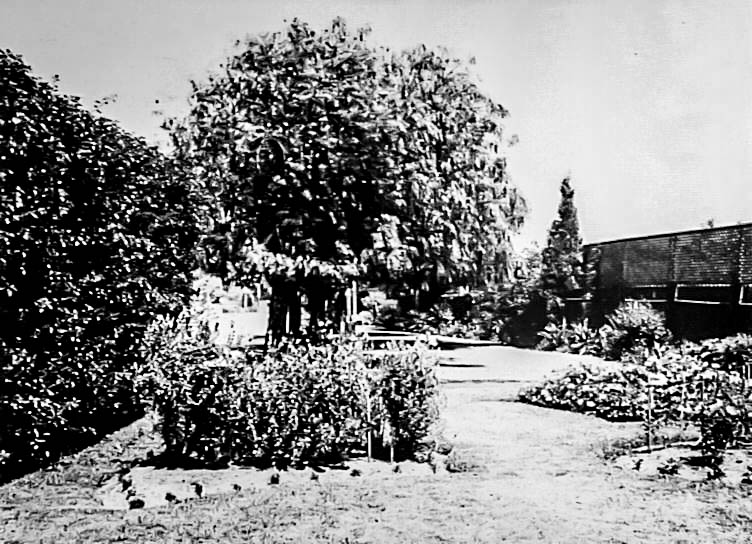
Gardens
