= Waverley Bus Depot =

Bus depot in the Sydney suburb of Bondi Junction

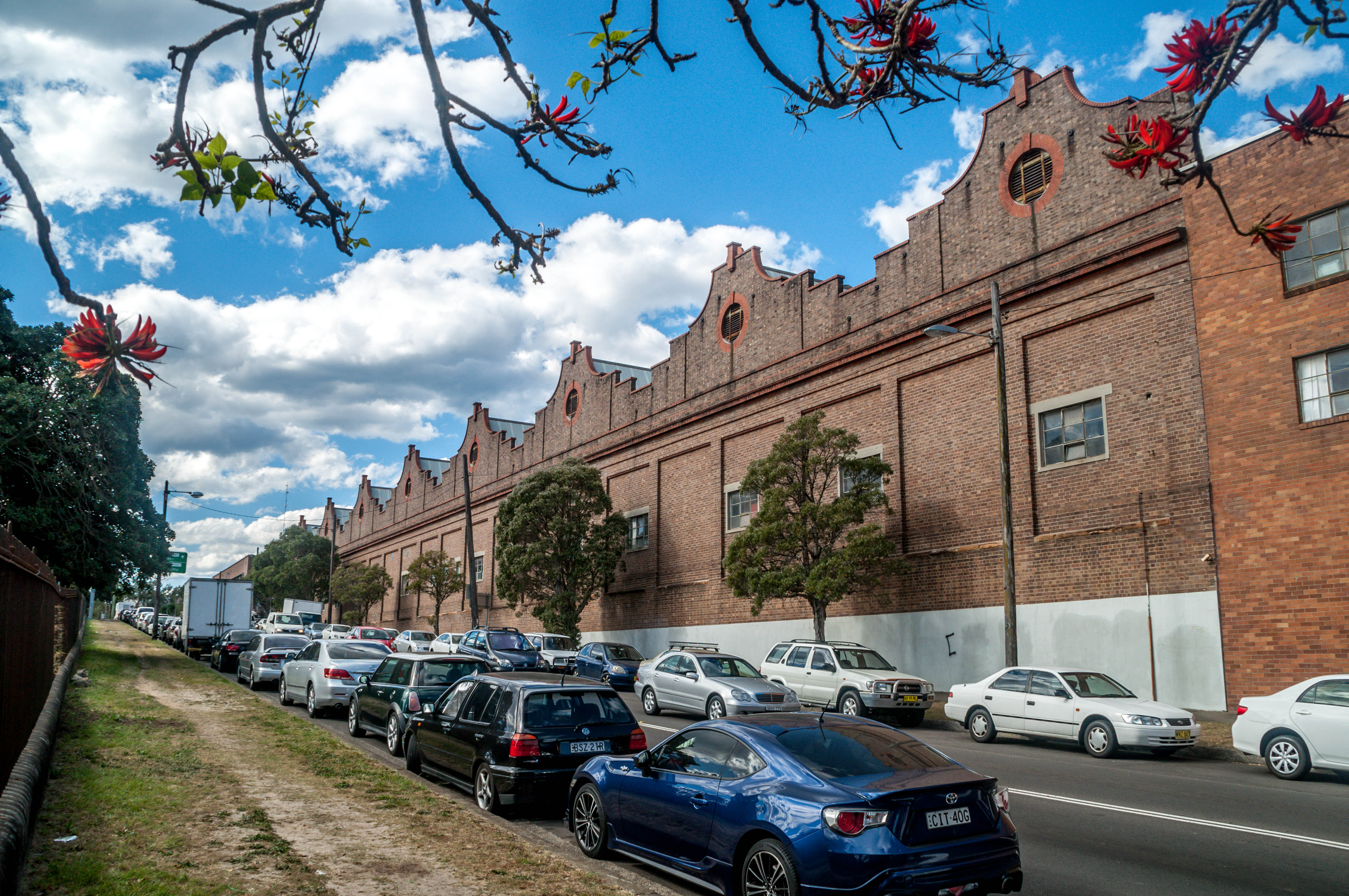
- Northbound view along York Road
- Interactive map of Waverley Bus Depot

Location
- Location: Cnr Oxford St & York Rd, Bondi Junction
- Coordinates: 33°53′26″S 151°14′33″E

Characteristics
- Owner: Transport for NSW
- Operator: Transdev John Holland
- Depot code: W

History
- Opened: 7 September 1902

Waverley Bus Depot, originally Waverley Tram Depot, is a bus depot in the Sydney suburb of Bondi Junction operated by Transdev John Holland.

== History ==
Waverley Tram Depot opened on 7 September 1902 as a seventeen road depot on the corner of Oxford Street and York Road, Bondi Junction. It provided trams that operated the Bondi and Bronte routes.

The depot closed on 27 June 1959 for conversion a to bus depot. Today only the southern section of the car shed remains, the northern section having been demolished.

As part of the contracting out of Sydney Bus Region 9, operation of Waverley depot passed from State Transit to Transdev John Holland on 2 April 2022.

As of February 2026, it has an allocation of 167 buses.

== Design ==
The side elevations looking west to Centennial Park were designed with stepped Dutch gables with circular ventilation openings. Including:

- 17 tracks
- brick gabled parapet
- brick stepped style gables, with circular vents
- Roof orientation to south

== Gallery ==
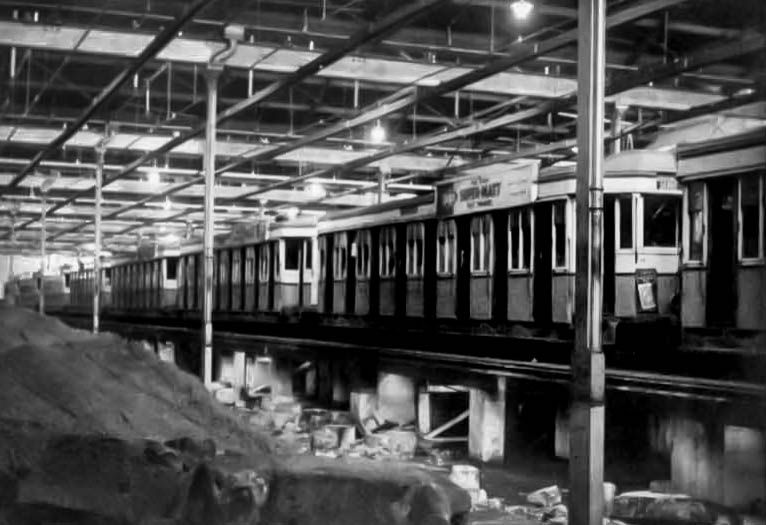
Interior view c.1959

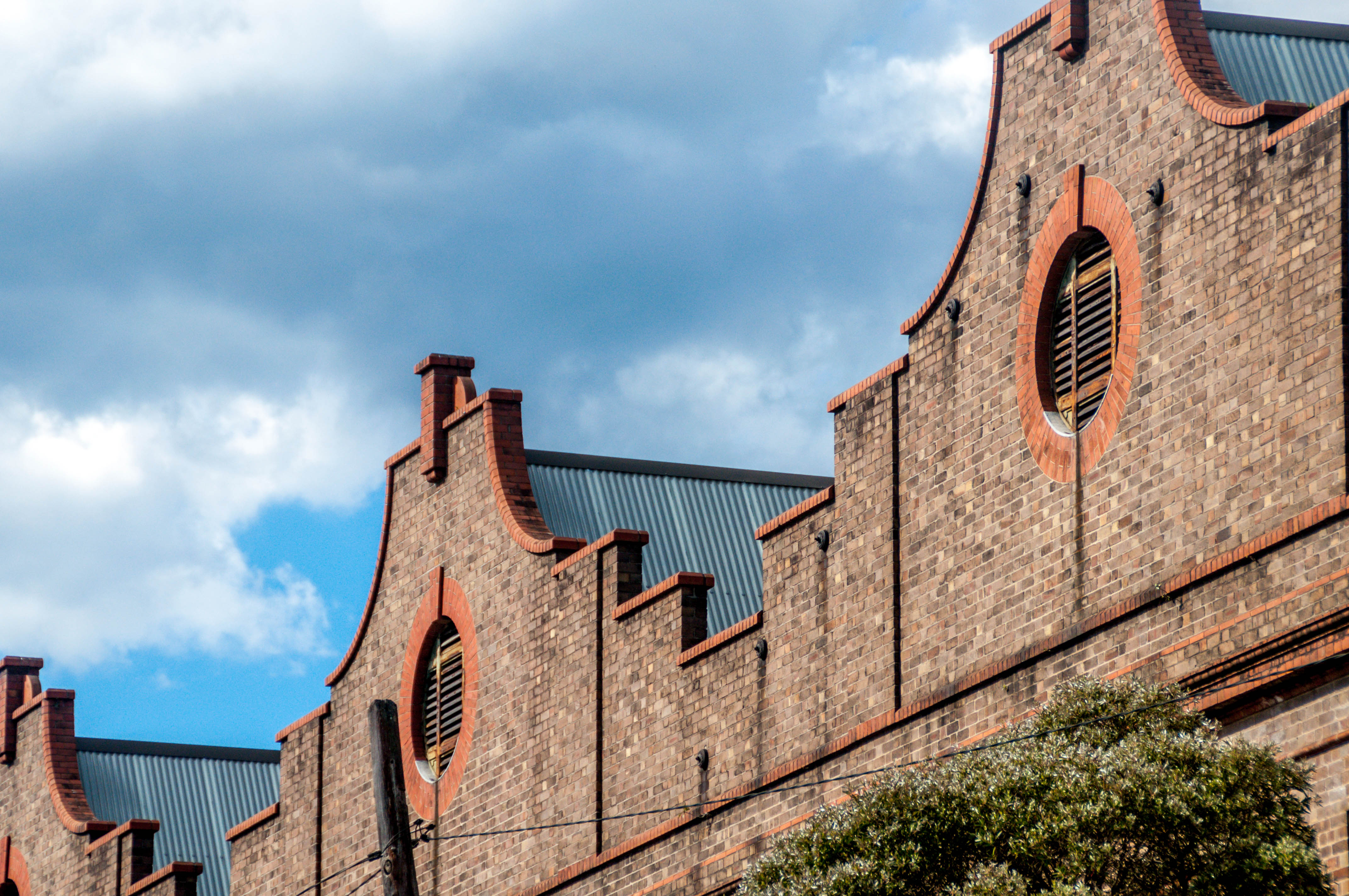
Stepped style gables, with circular vents

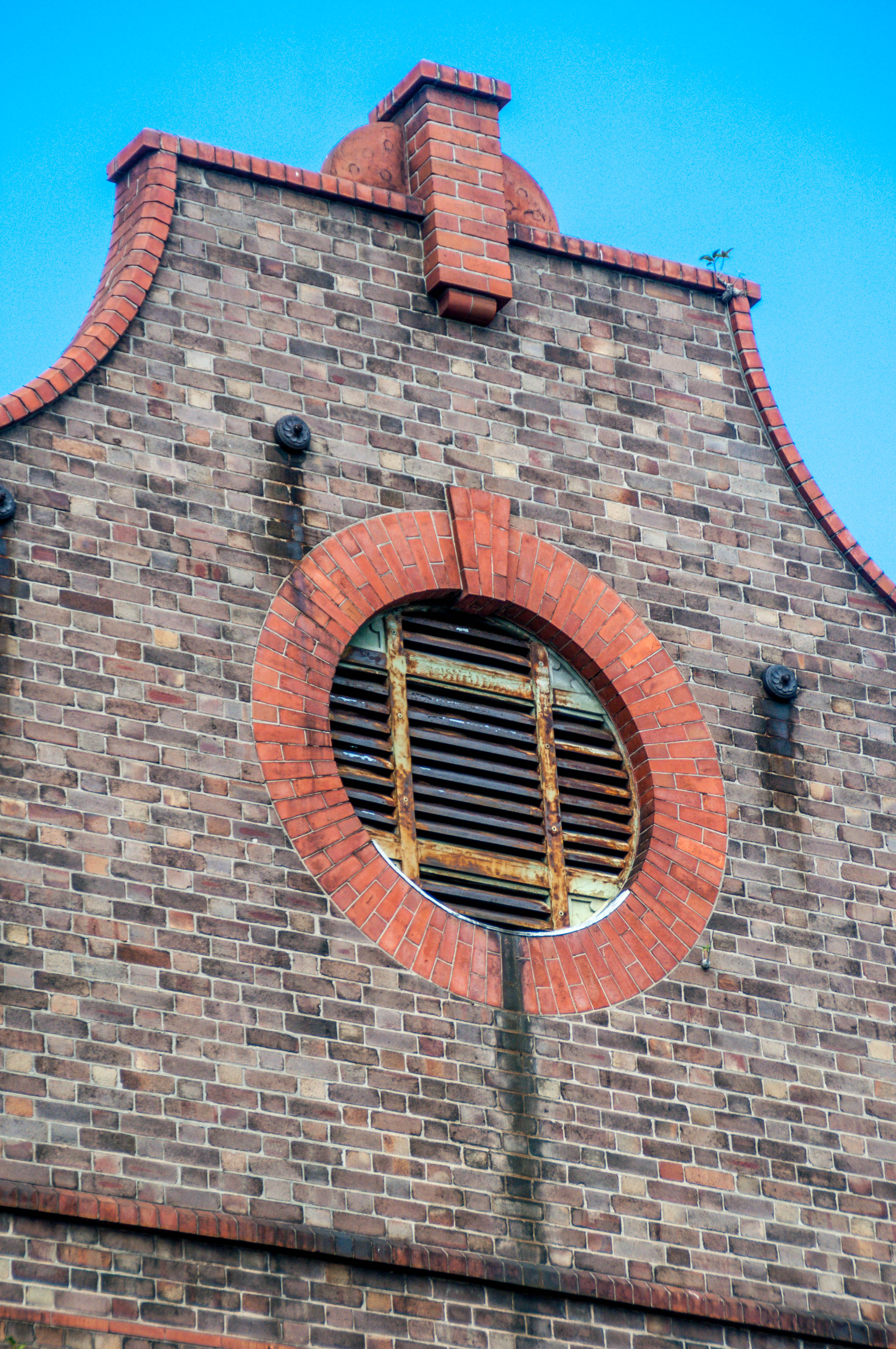
Circular vent detail

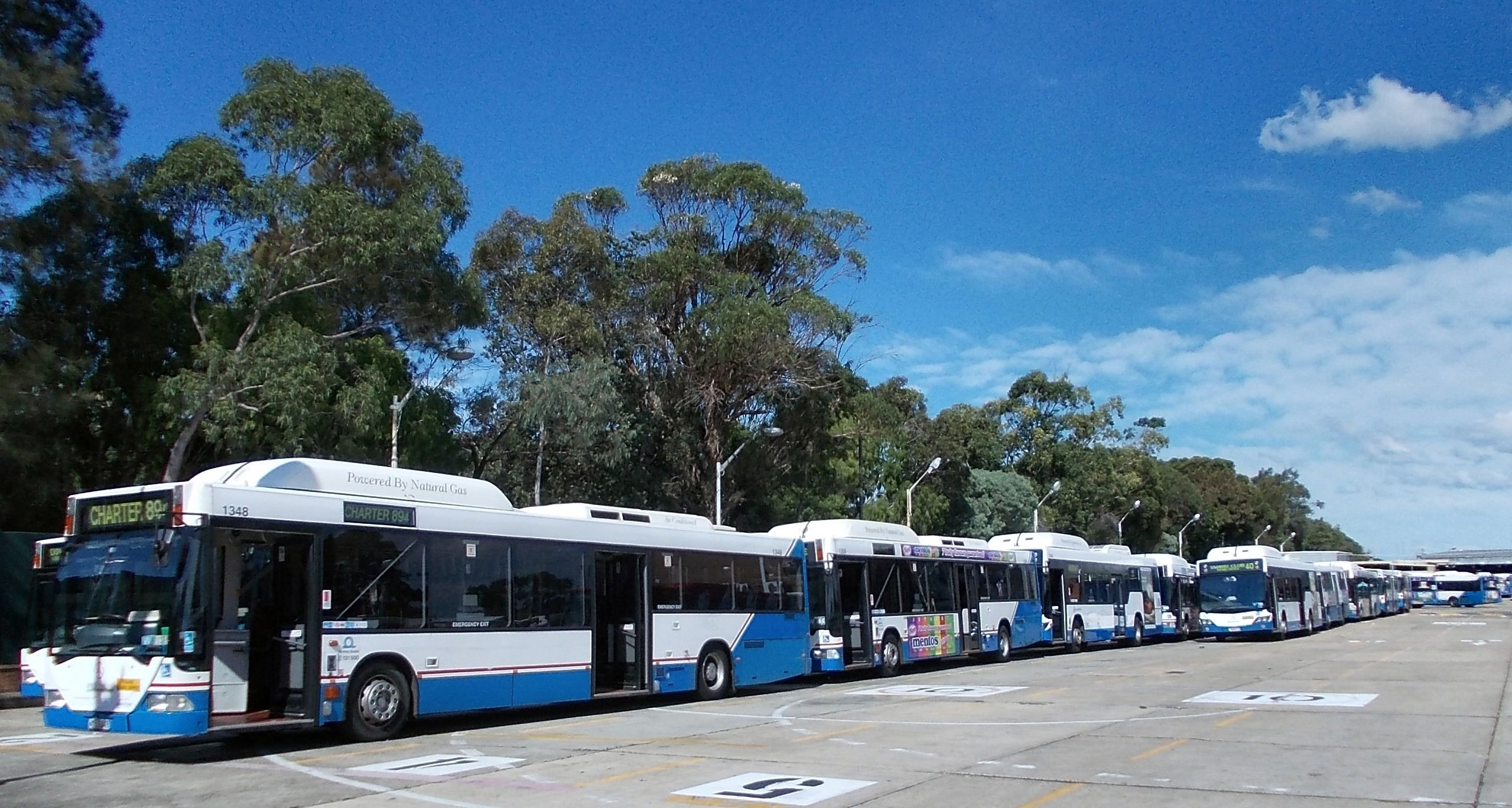
Northern section of the depot in 2011 with State Transit buses
