= State Transit Authority =

NSW Government public transit authority

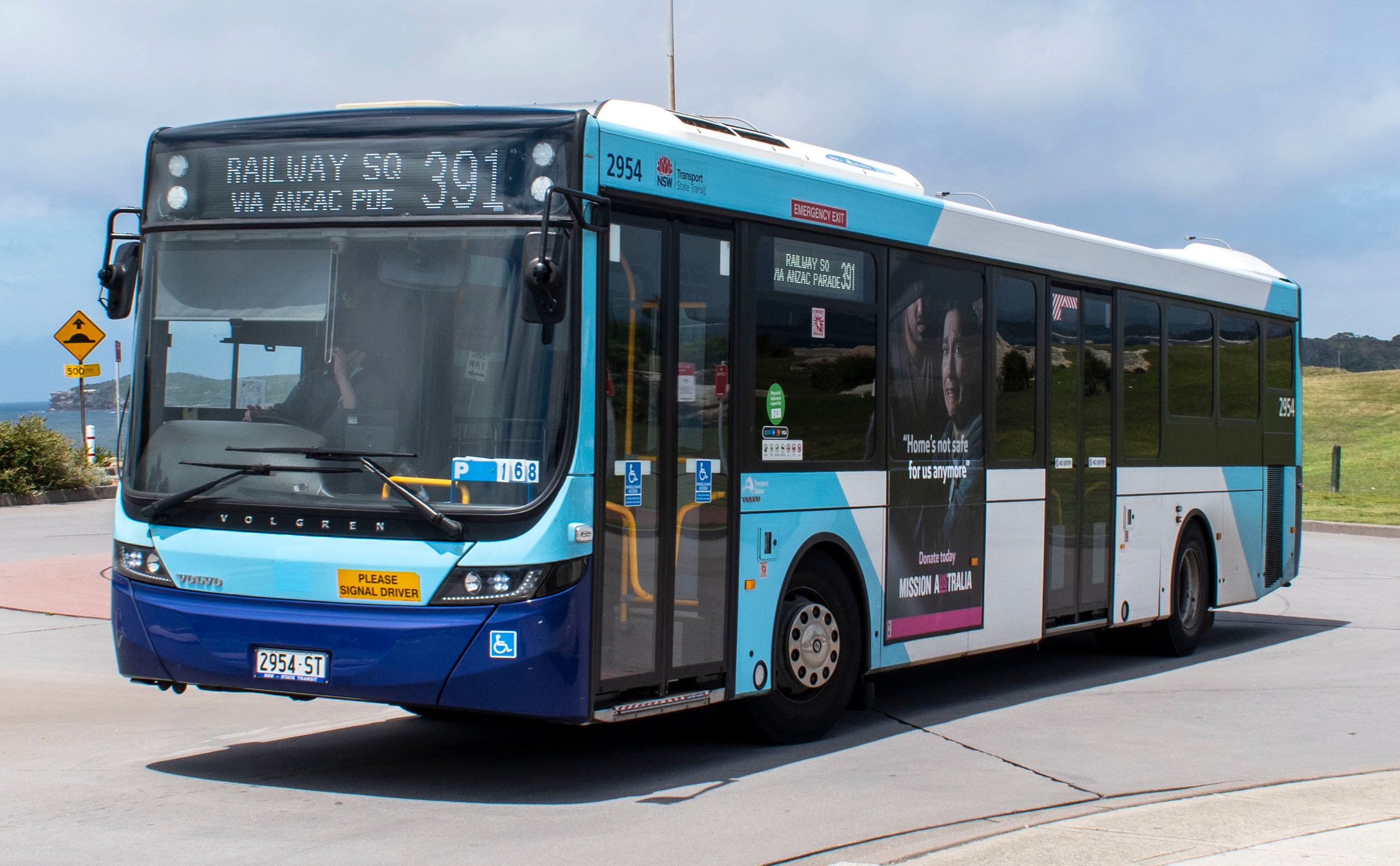
- Volgren bodied Volvo B8RLE in Transport for NSW livery in December 2021

Statutory Authority overview
- Formed: 16 January 1989; 37 years ago
- Preceding Statutory Authority: Urban Transit Authority
- Dissolved: 2 April 2022; 4 years ago
- Jurisdiction: New South Wales, Australia
- Headquarters: Sydney
- Minister responsible: John Graham, Minister for Transport
- Statutory Authority executive: Daniela Fontana, Chief Executive
- Parent Statutory Authority: Transport for NSW
- Key documents: Transport Authorities Act 1980 (NSW); Transport Administration Act 1988 (NSW)

The State Transit Authority of New South Wales, also referred to as State Transit, was an agency of the Government of New South Wales operating bus services in Sydney. Superseding the Urban Transit Authority in 1989, it was also responsible for the provision of ferry services in Sydney until 2004 and bus and ferry services in Newcastle until 2017. It ceased trading after 2 April 2022 with its remaining operations to be contracted out by Transport for NSW to replacement operators. As of November 2024, the New South Wales Government has not yet put forward a Bill for the dissolution of the State Transit Authority of NSW.

== History ==
Logo of State Transit used until 2010

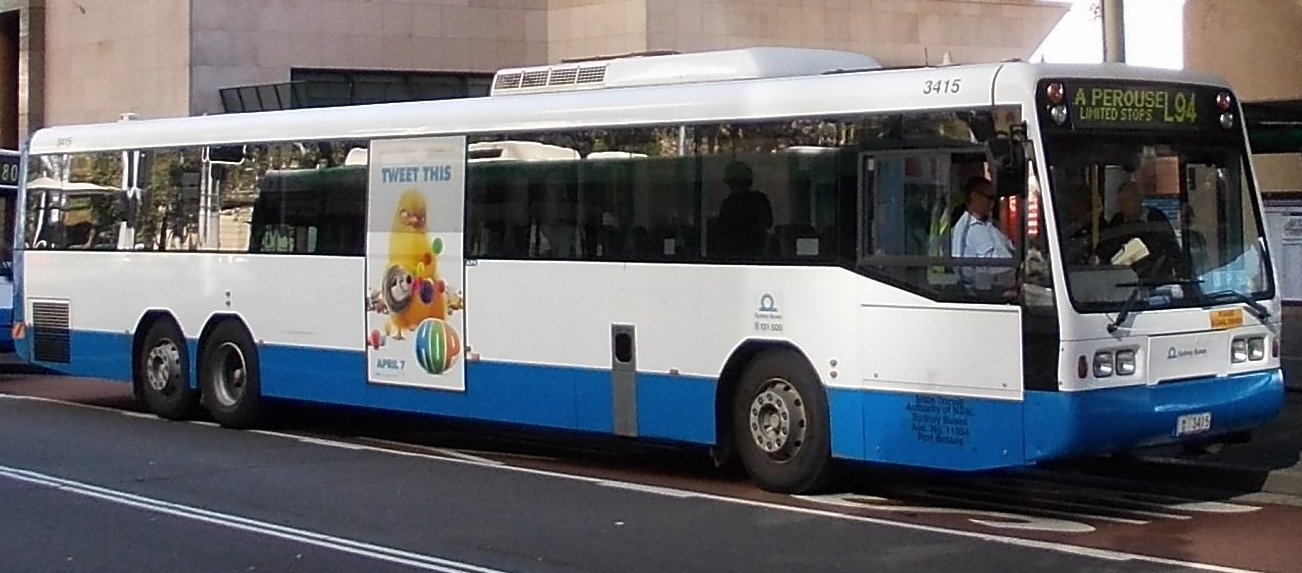
Ansair bodied Scania L113TRB 14.5-metre in previous State Transit livery

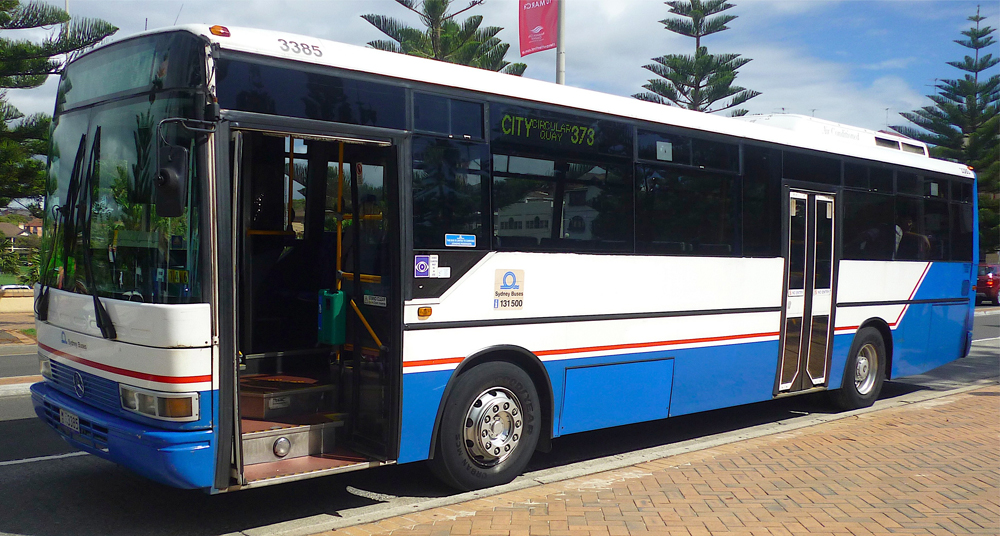
Pressed Metal Corporation bodied Mercedes-Benz O405 at Coogee in February 2013

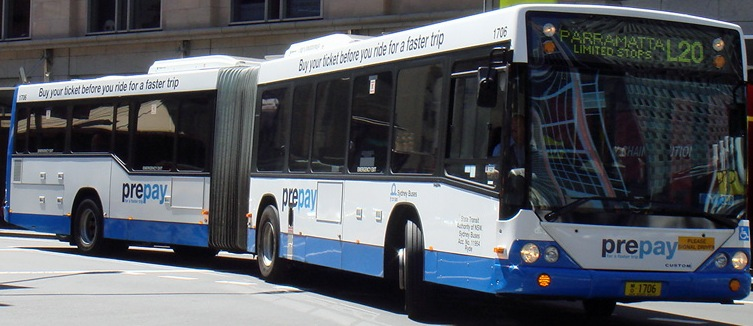
Custom Coaches bodied Volvo B12BLEA in May 2009

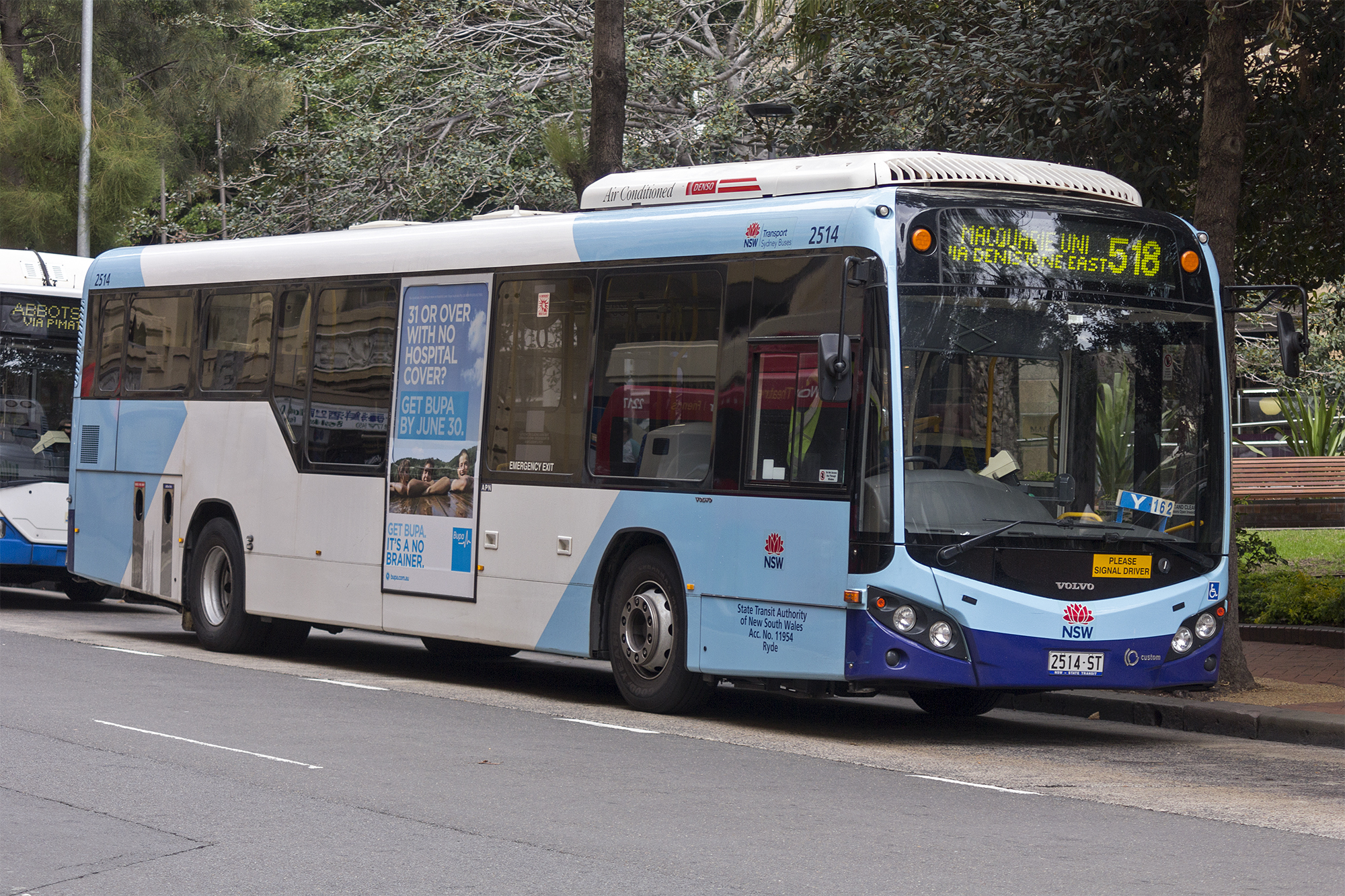
Transport for NSW liveried Custom Coaches CB80 bodied Volvo B7RLE at Circular Quay in June 2014

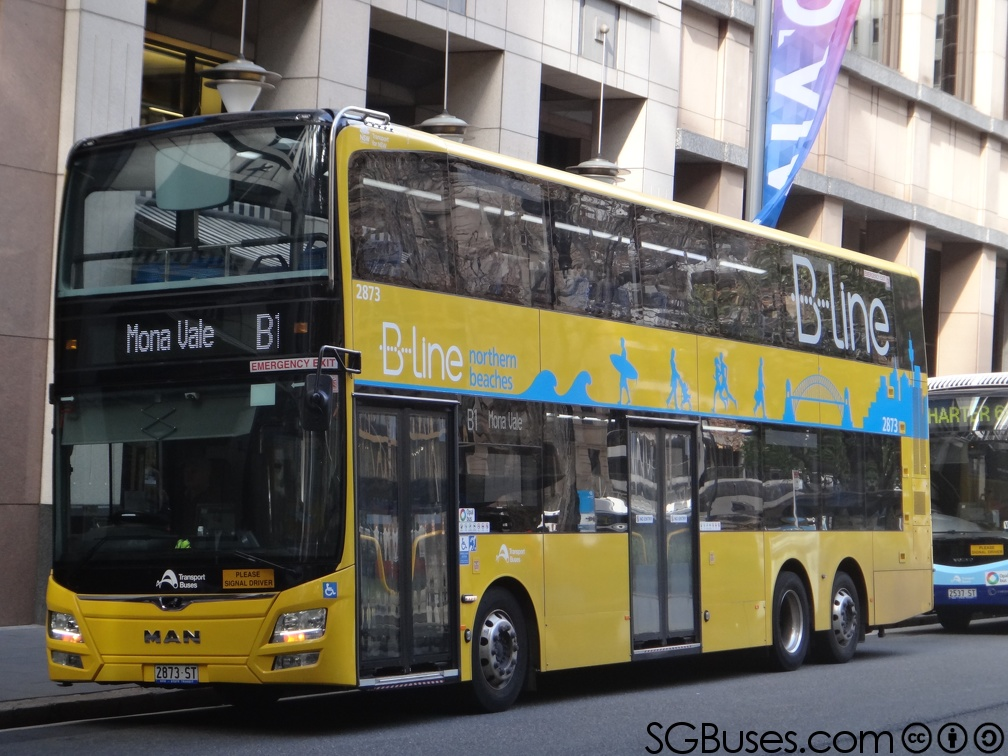
Gemilang Coachworks bodied MAN A95 in June 2018

In view of its political sensitivity, the agencies responsible for public transport in New South Wales are frequently restructured. Buses and ferries were the responsibility of the Department of Government Transport until 1972, when it was merged with the Department of Railways New South Wales to form the Public Transport Commission.

In July 1980, the Transport Authorities Act 1980 (NSW) separated the functions of the Public Transport Commission with the State Rail Authority taking responsibility for trains, and the Urban Transit Authority responsibility for buses and ferries.

In January 1989, the Transport Administration Act 1988 (NSW) restructured the Urban Transit Authority as the State Transit Authority, taking over the private bus service functions of the Department of Motor Transport. In October 1989, the Chullora Bus Workshops closed with a smaller facility established at Randwick for mechanical repairs with body repairs contracted to the private sector. The remaining four hydrofoils were replaced by three JetCats and the MetroTen ticketing system introduced a few years before was replaced with the Automated Fare Collection System. The Opal card ticketing system was rolled out from 2013.

In December 1999, North & Western Bus Lines was purchased followed in February 2000 by Parramatta-Ryde Bus Service.

In 2004, the STA's Sydney Ferries business was separated into a separate agency, Sydney Ferries Corporation. In January 2005 most of former Harris Park Transport routes were taken over from Hillsbus, which were then returned to Hillsbus in September 2005 with the exception of routes 623, 624, 628 and 629. On 13 October 2013, the Western Sydney Buses route T80 was taken over by private operator Transit Systems.

Bus services in Sydney were operated under the Sydney Buses brand until 2016, when rebranded as State Transit.

Until 30 June 2017, State Transit also operated services in Newcastle and Lake Macquarie through Newcastle Buses & Ferries. These services are now operated by Newcastle Transport.

In February 2018, Transit Systems won the tender to take over State Transit's Sydney Bus Region 6 from 1 July 2018, including Burwood, Kingsgrove, Leichhardt and Tempe depots and 600 buses. In October 2019, it was announced that State Transit's remaining three bus regions are to be contracted out in early 2020. Region 8 was taken over by Keolis Downer Northern Beaches in October 2021 with 410 buses operating out of Brookvale, Mona Vale and North Sydney depots. Region 7 was taken over by Busways in January 2022. Region 9 was taken over by Transdev John Holland in April 2022.

== Former units ==
The State Transit Authority also comprised three former business units.

=== Sydney Ferries ===
Sydney Ferries is the public transport authority for ferry services on Port Jackson in Sydney. It was established in 2004 as a government agency, separate of the State Transit Authority.

=== Western Sydney Buses ===
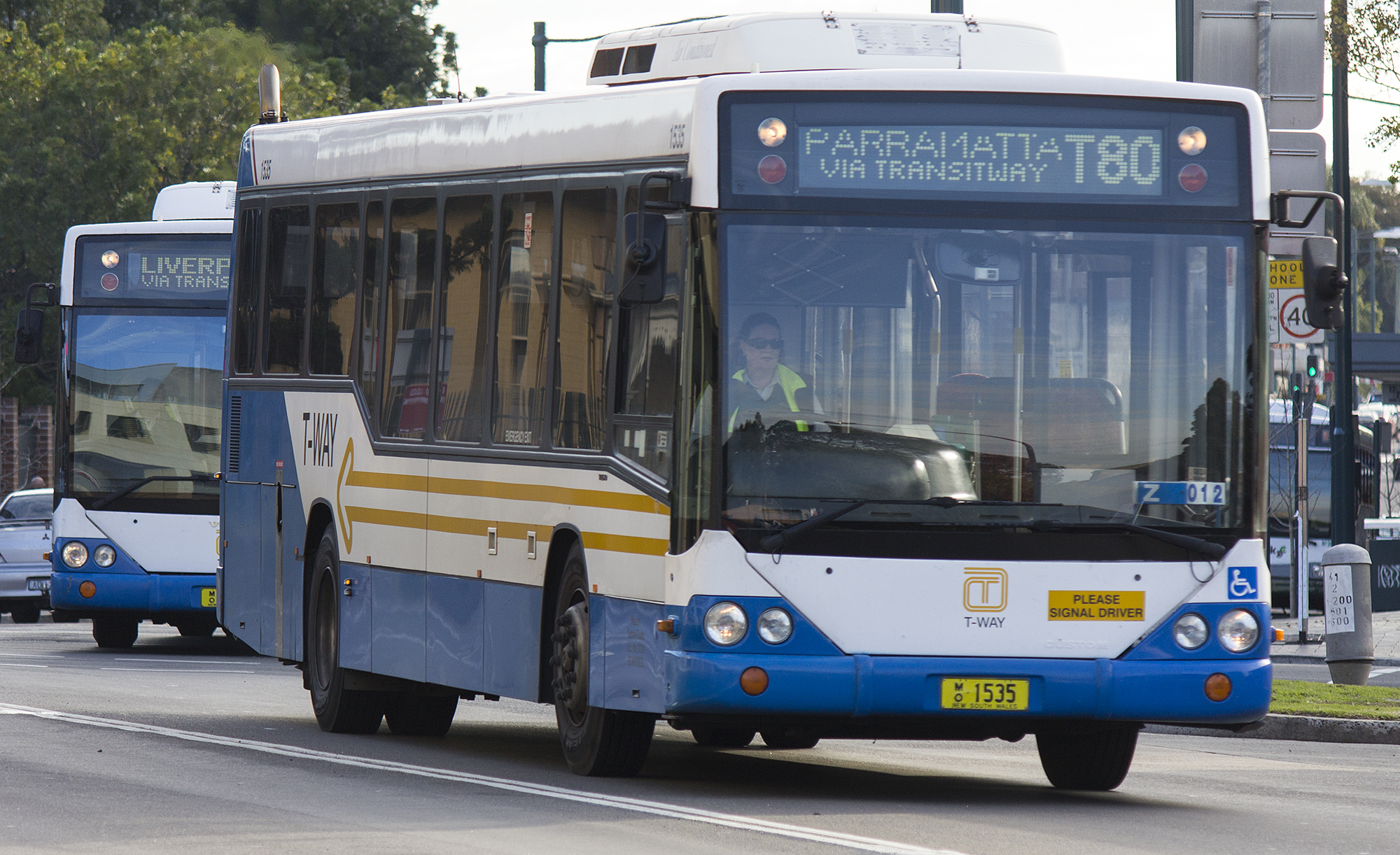
Western Sydney Buses Custom Coaches CB60 bodied Volvo B12BLE in Liverpool in previous State Transit T-Way livery, July 2013

Formed in 2003, Western Sydney Buses operated route T80, a bus rapid transit service in Western Sydney on the Liverpool–Parramatta T-way. Passengers made 2.77 million journeys with Western Sydney Buses in the 2011/12 financial year. Western Sydney Buses operated out of a corner of Westbus' Bonnyrigg depot.

In November 2012, Transit Systems won the tender for Sydney Bus Region 3 which included route T80 with the service and 22 buses transferring on 13 October 2013.

=== Newcastle Buses & Ferries ===
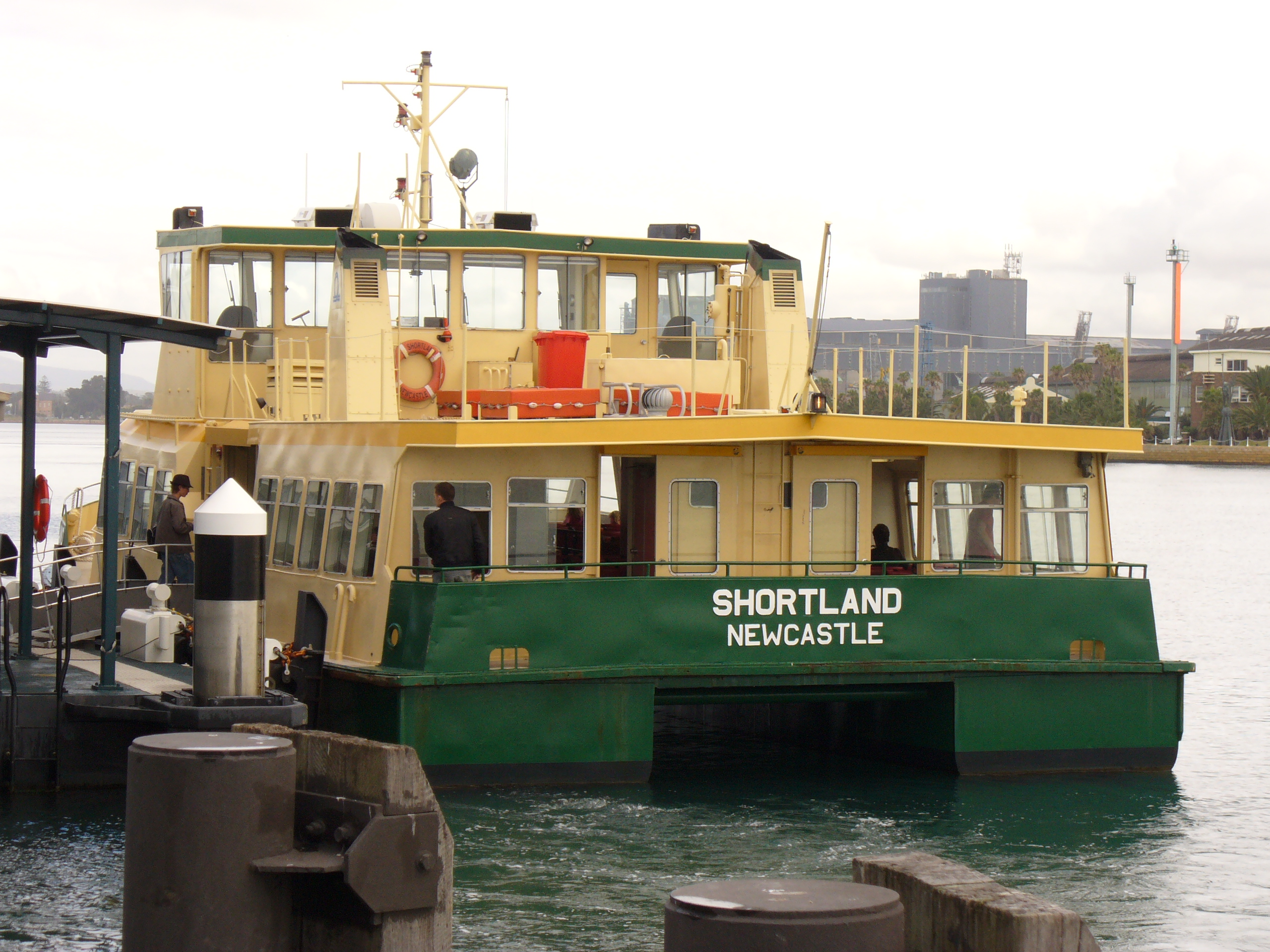
MV Shortland operating the Stockton ferry service in July 2006

Newcastle Buses & Ferries was a bus and ferry service operator in Newcastle and Lake Macquarie. It operated 28 bus routes plus a ferry service across the Hunter River between Queens Wharf and Stockton. The network radiated from a bus terminal near Newcastle station. Major interchanges were located at the University of Newcastle, Wallsend, Glendale, Warners Bay, Belmont, Charlestown Square and Westfield Kotara.

Newcastle Buses & Ferries ceased trading on 30 June 2017, with Newcastle Transport taking over.

== Services ==
State Transit operated services in Sydney Metropolitan contract regions 6 to 9.

For school bus services, State Transit used 5/6/7xx series route numbers suffixed with E for East, N for North and W for West, while 89x routes were used for University of New South Wales services. Such university routes ceased as from Monday 21 December 2020, having been replaced by the CBD and South East Light Rail.

== Fleet ==
State Transit inherited a fleet of 1,565 Leyland Leopards, Mercedes-Benz O305s, Mercedes-Benz O405s and MAN SL202s from the Urban Transit Authority. New buses were primarily purchased from Mercedes-Benz, Scania and Volvo. The fleet peaked at 2,172 buses in June 2017 before privatisation commenced.

In the early 1990s, State Transit adopted a white and blue livery with a red stripe. This livery with minor variations was retained until 2010, when the Transport for NSW white and blue livery was adopted. Buses dedicated to Metrobus services were painted in a red livery.

In 2017, State Transit purchased its first double-decker buses for use on B-Line services. These were painted in a yellow and blue livery.

== Depots ==
Prior to privatisation, State Transit operated 14 depots.

- Eastern Region
  - Port Botany (P)
  - Randwick (R)
  - Waverley (W)
- Northern Region
  - Brookvale (V)
  - Mona Vale (F)
  - North Sydney (N)
  - Willoughby (M)
- Southern & Western Region
  - Burwood (B)
  - Leichhardt (L)
  - Kingsgrove (K)
  - Ryde (Y)
  - Tempe (T)
- Newcastle Region
  - Belmont
  - Hamilton

A fifteenth depot in Enfield closed in September 1989 being sold to the Maronite Church in 1993.
