= Opal card rollout dates =

The Opal card rolled out across New South Wales public transport services from 7 December 2012 until December 2014. Additionally, from December 2017, OpalPay was introduced and can be used as payment on selected third party services. This article contains all the dates of official Opal card and OpalPay rollouts.

== Public ferries ==
=== Sydney Ferries ===
The first stage of the Opal card rollout commenced on 7 December 2012 as a trial on the Neutral Bay to Circular Quay ferry service followed on 8 April 2013 by the Manly to Circular Quay service, and on 12 August 2013 to the Eastern Suburbs, Mosman and Taronga Zoo.

From 30 August 2013, Opal was available on all public Sydney Ferries services.

=== Newcastle Ferries ===
Opal was rolled out on Newcastle Ferries' Stockton ferry service on 20 November 2014, along with Newcastle Buses' routes.

=== Private ferries ===
The Manly Fast Ferry operated by NRMA started using the Opal card system on 1 October 2023.

== Trains ==
=== Sydney Trains ===
The first Opal rollout on train services was in June 2013. The following is the list of rollouts on Sydney Trains:

- 14 June 2013: Stations on the City Circle and T4 Eastern Suburbs lines
- 30 August 2013: Stations on the T1 North Shore line up to Chatswood
- 31 January 2014: Stations on the T2 Inner West line up to Strathfield and on T1 North Shore and Northern lines
- 14 February 2014: Stations on the T2 South line to Casula via Granville, the T6 Carlingford line, and the T7 Olympic Park line
- 28 February 2014: Stations on the entire T1 Western line to Emu Plains and to Richmond
- 28 March 2014: All other Sydney Trains stations

This marks the completed rollout for all Sydney Trains stations.

As of November 2018, the rollout began where commuters can use their credit card & mobile devices to 'tap on' & 'tap off' on the Opal Sydney Trains network.

=== NSW TrainLink intercity ===
Opal was rolled out on all NSW TrainLink intercity stations within the first 2 weeks of April 2014. However, some stations on the Central Coast & Newcastle Line was rolled out earlier as part of the Sydney Trains T1 rollout:

- 31 January 2014: Stations on the Central Coast & Newcastle Line up to Wyong
- 4 April 2014: Stations on the entire Southern Highlands and South Coast lines to Goulburn and Bomaderry
- 11 April 2014: All other NSW TrainLink Intercity stations.

This marks the completed rollout for all NSW TrainLink Intercity stations in New South Wales.

== Public buses ==
The first Opal rollout on buses was in September 2013. It was rolled out across all buses on the Sydney Metropolitan Bus System Contracts (MBSC) and Sydney Outer Metropolitan Bus System Contracts (OMBSC).

=== Public buses in Sydney ===
The following is the list of rollouts for bus routes in Sydney, including school services of any region mentioned:

- 30 September 2013: Transdev NSW routes 594 and 594H
- 6 December 2013: Sydney Buses' route 333 from Circular Quay to Bondi Beach, one of Sydney's most heavily used routes
- 14 April 2014:
  - The rest of Transdev NSW's Region 12 routes
  - NightRide buses that are Opal enabled. At this point this only applies to NightRide routes N80, N90 and N100 which use Region 12 buses.
- 28 April 2014: Sydney Buses's selected Region 9 Waverley depot routes 326, 327, 355, 361 and L24
- 10 June 2014: All of Forest Coach Lines' Region 14 routes
- 30 June 2014: All of Hillsbus' NightRide and Region 4 routes
- 14 July 2014: All of Transit Systems'Region 3 routes
- 16 July 2014: All of Punchbowl Bus Company's NightRide and Region 5 routes
- 21 July 2014: Rest of Sydney Buses' Eastern Suburbs (Region 9) routes that operate out of Waverley, Randwick and Port Botany depots
- 7 August 2014: Sydney Buses' Northern Beaches (Region 8) routes that operate out of Brookvale depot
- 11 August 2014: All of Busways' Region 1 routes
- 20 August 2014: Sydney Buses' Northern Beaches (Region 8) routes that operate out of North Sydney depot. The Ministerial release for this also appears to have covered Mona Vale depot by default, but readers were noticed active only about a week later.
- 26 August 2014: All of Transdev NSW's Region 10 and 13 routes including NightRide routes.
  - All NightRide routes now enabled.
- 11 September 2014: Sydney Buses' Inner West (Region 6) routes that operate out of Burwood and Kingsgrove depots
- 7 October 2014:
  - Sydney Buses' Inner West (Region 6) routes that operate out of Leichhardt and Tempe depots
  - All of Interline Bus Services' Region 2 routes
  - All of Busabout's Region 15 routes
- 10 November 2014: All of Sydney Buses' North Sydney (Region 7) routes that operate out of Ryde and Willoughby depots.
- 20 November 2014: Sydney Buses' routes E32, E35, E36 and E41. These were not rolled out as part of the Region 8 rollout because Opal card users and/or Manly ferry passengers could ride these services for free until the end of 12 month free travel promotion in November 2014.

This marks the completed rollout for all Sydney Metropolitan Bus Contracts.

=== Regional and outer metropolitan public buses ===
The first Opal rollout on outer metropolitan buses was in August 2014. The following is a list of rollouts for regional buses, including school services of any region mentioned:

- 4 August 2014: All of Blue Mountains Bus Company's Outer Metropolitan Region 8 routes
- 1 September 2014: Hunter Valley Buses' Outer Metropolitan Region 4 routes
- 29 September 2014: Hunter Valley Buses' Outer Metropolitan Region 2 routes
- 13 October 2014: All of Outer Metropolitan Region 6 routes operated by Busways and Coastal Liner.
- 14 October 2014: All of Rover Coaches' Outer Metropolitan Region 1 routes
- 15 October 2014: All of Port Stephens Coaches' Outer Metropolitan Region 3 routes. This rollout was never officially announced and was not mentioned on the Opal website until a week later. It is believed that the rollout happened on the date stated on the gazette which was 15 October.
- 16 October 2014: All of Red Bus' Outer Metropolitan Region 7 routes
- 3 November 2014: All of Outer Metropolitan Regions 9 and 10 routes operated by Dion's Bus Service, Green's Northern Coaches and Premier Illawarra
- 20 November 2014: All of Newcastle Buses' Outer Metropolitan Region 5 routes. This was rolled out along with Newcastle Ferries' Stockton service.

This marks the completed rollout for all outer Sydney Metropolitan Bus Contracts.

=== Routes stated on the gazette ===
Often, some routes have also progressively become partially Opal-enabled because they are run by different depots. These rollouts are only stated on the New South Wales government gazettes and are not announced through ministerial announcements. It is not compulsory for bus routes to be partially Opal-enabled on the dates stated on the gazettes. However it allows some buses to be Opal enabled even before the ministerial announcements.

By the Order, Opal can be used on gazetted routes if buses carry an "Opal bus" or "Opal on this bus" sticker. In other words, Opal cannot be used on bus routes that are not stated in the gazette, or on a bus without the "Opal bus" or "Opal on this bus", even it is running a gazetted route.

The routes and the dates stated on the gazettes are (excluding those covered by official ministerial announcements):

- 28 April 2014: Sydney Buses' Waverley depot routes 200, 300–396 (except 341, 392 and those announced by the government), 400, 410, 890–895, L94, M40, X10, X39, X40, X73, X74, X77, X84, X89 (includes routes from Randwick depot and Port Botany depot)
- 23 June 2014: Sydney Buses' Randwick depot routes 341, 392, 399, 418, L09, M50, X09, X92, X96 (includes routes from Port Botany depot and Tempe depot)
- 9 July 2014: Sydney Buses' Port Botany depot routes 397, M10, M20, X03, X94, X97, X99
- 11 July 2014: Sydney Buses' Moore Park special services 1, 3, 32
- 24 July 2014: Sydney Buses' Brookvale depot routes 131–190 (except 187 and 189), 201, 227, 228, 230, 243, 244, 246–249, 253, 263, E32–E88 (except E85 and E87), L60–L90 (except L84, L87) (includes routes from Mona Vale depot, North Sydney depot and Willoughby depot)
- 4 August 2014: All of Busways' Region 1 routes
- 8 August 2014: Sydney Buses' Mona Vale depot routes 130, 187, 189, E85, E87, L84 and L87
- 15 August 2014: Sydney Buses' North Sydney depot routes 202, 204, 225, 229, 236, 238, 245, 257, 265, 269, 273 and M30 (includes routes from Willoughby depot and Tempe depot)
- 25 August 2014: Sydney Buses' Burwood depot routes 401, 407, 408, 423, 436, 438, 439, 440, 443, 458–466, 480, 483, 502, 504, 525, 526, L38, L39 and M41 (includes routes from Leichhardt, Kingsgrove depot and Ryde depot)
- 3 September 2014: Sydney Buses' Kingsgrove depot routes 406, 412, 413, 415, 422, 426, 428, 431, 441, 444, 445, 470–479, 490–495, L23 and L28 (includes routes from Tempe depot and Leichhardt depot)
- 17 September 2014: Sydney Buses' Leichhardt depot routes 433, 442, 448, 501, 508, 510, 998, L37 and X04 (includes routes from Ryde depot)
- 2 October 2014: Sydney Buses' Tempe depot routes 425 and 430
- 10 October 2014: Sydney Buses' Ryde depot routes 206, 209, 251–256 (except 253), 258, 261, 285–297, 500, 505, 506, 507, 513–524, 533–553, M52, M54, X00, X06, X15 and X18 (includes routes from Willoughby depot)
- 31 October 2014: Sydney Buses' Willoughby depot routes 203, 205, 207, 208, 267, 272 and 275

== Light rail ==
Opal rollout on the Inner West Light Rail took place on 1 December 2014.

== OpalPay ==
=== Private ferry services ===
- 30 January 2018: Captain Cook ferries

=== On demand bus services ===
OpalPay was rolled out on selected on demand services in New South Wales:

- 1 July 2018: Bridj's Inner West on demand service
- 20 August 2018: Bridj's Eastern Suburbs on demand service
- Unknown date: Newcastle Transport's Lake Macquarie on demand service
- Unknown date: Keoride's Macquarie Park on demand service
- Unknown date: Keoride's Northern Beaches on demand service

== Park & Ride ==
The Opal Park & Ride scheme was introduced on selected car parks in Sydney:

- January 2018: B-Line commuter car parks.
- May 2018: Ashfield station
- September 2018: Kogarah station
- By November 2019 it is also available at Seven Hills Station

== Contactless – Buses ==
The use of contactless cards is being rolled out on buses as follows, with completion expected by the end of October 2019:

- 2 August 2019: Dion's Bus Service Outer Metropolitan Region 12.
- 5 August 2019: Hillsbus Region 4.
- 12 August 2019: Busways Region 1.
- 19 August 2019: Transit Systems Region 6.
- 26 August 2019: Transdev NSW Region 10 and Region 12.
- 2 September 2019: Hunter Valley Buses Outer Metropolitan regions 2, 4 and 11, Newcastle Transport Newcastle Region 1, Red Bus Services Outer Metropolitan Region 7, Port Stephens Coaches Outer Metropolitan Region 3 and Rover Coaches Outer Metropolitan Region 1
- 9 September 2019: Punchbowl Bus Company Region 5, Transit Systems Region 3, Interline Region 2, Busabout Region 15 and Busways Central Coast Region 6
- 16 September 2019: Premier Charters Outer Metropolitan Region 9, Premier Illawarra Outer Metropolitan Region 10, Blue Mountains Transit Outer Metropolitan Region 8 and Forest Coach Lines Region 14.
- 23 September 2019: The remaining five Sydney regions not listed above were converted, completing this conversion.
