= Metrobus (Sydney) =

Sydney high frequency, high capacity bus network

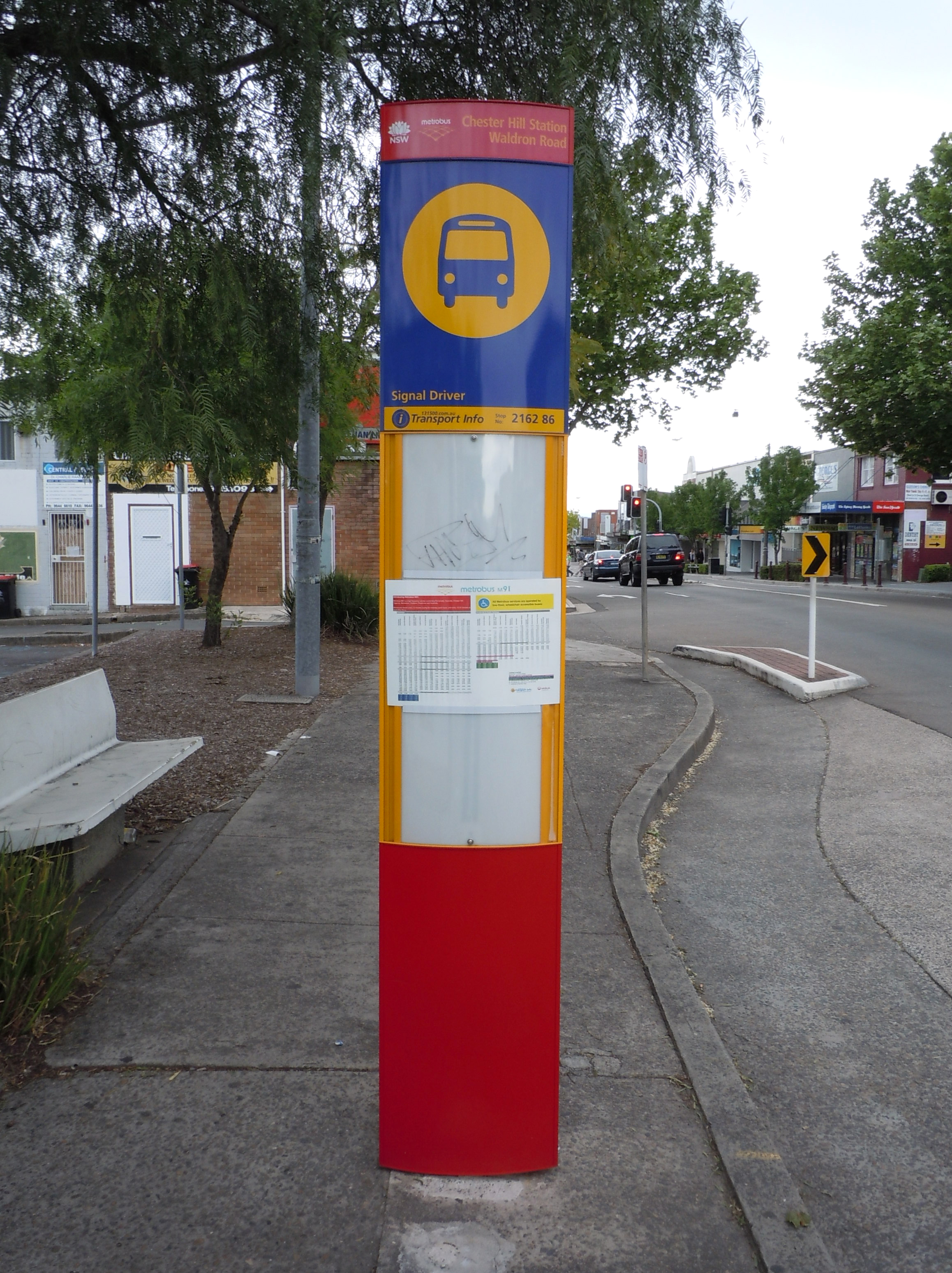
- Metrobus blade stop sign at Chester Hill with the name of the stop and a red section showing the stop is served by Metrobus

Overview
- Owner: Transport for NSW
- Locale: Sydney
- Transit type: Bus
- Number of lines: 13 (at peak, 2011); 1 (as of 2026)

Operation
- Began operation: 2008–2011
- Operators: Hillsbus; State Transit; Transdev NSW; Transit Systems NSW; U-Go Mobility

Metrobus (stylised as metrobus) is a high frequency, high capacity bus network in Sydney, New South Wales, Australia, first introduced in 2008. Metrobus services run every 10 minutes during peak periods, 15 minutes during off-peak weekday periods, and 20 minutes on weekends, linking key commercial suburbs and centres throughout the city, with the intention of making timetables obsolete.

All buses were initially painted in a distinctive red livery but were since reverted to the standard Transport for NSW livery of blue and white. All Metrobus services are wheelchair accessible. All route numbers were prefixed with an "M" followed by a two-digit number.

At its peak, there were 13 Metrobus routes in Sydney. As of June 2026, M90 is the only route still in operation.

== History ==
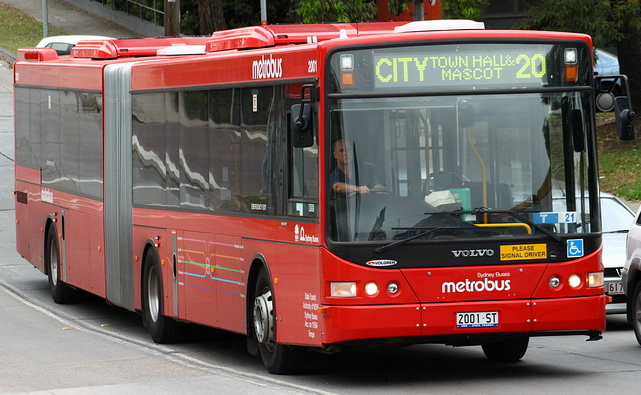
Sydney Buses Volgren bodied Volvo B12BLEA

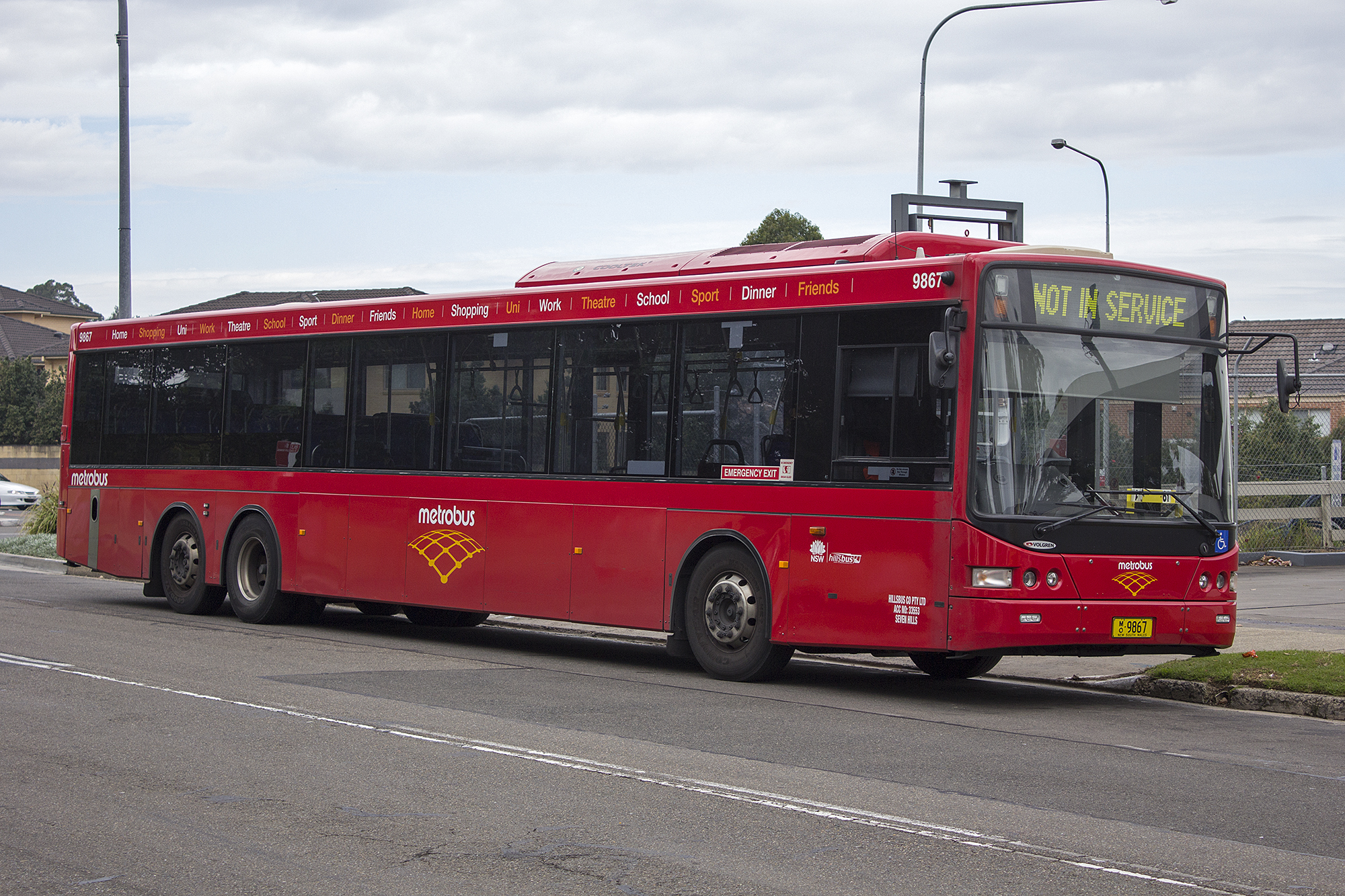
Hillsbus Volgren bodied Scania K280UB in July 2013

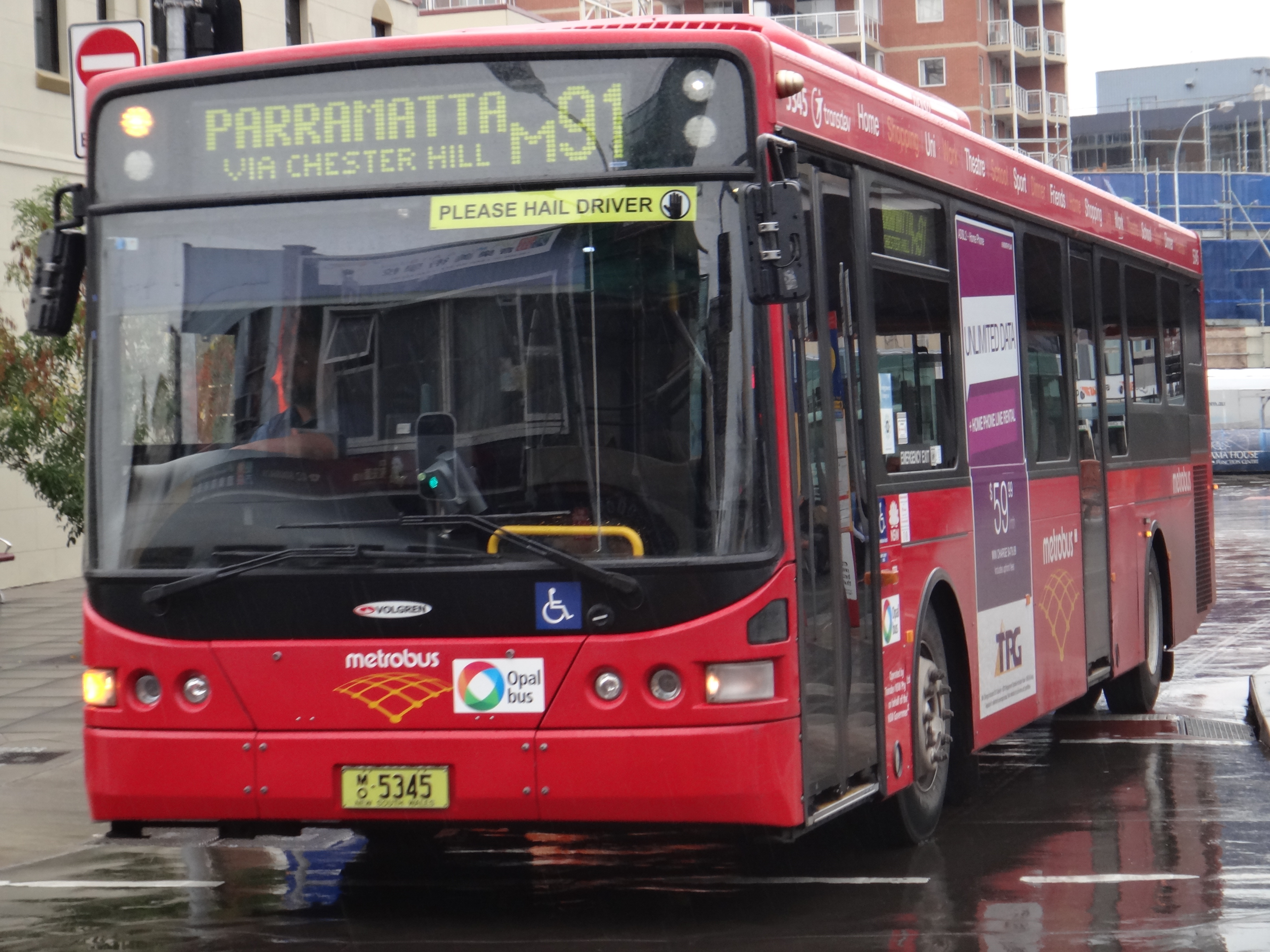
Transdev NSW Volgren bodied Volvo B7RLE in June 2015

The network originally operated along bus trunk routes through the inner suburbs, but passed through the CBD rather than terminating there. This reduced overcrowding on the trunk routes without needing to layover extra buses in the CBD. This concept was later diluted with the network's expansion to include long-distance routes servicing major activity centres in outer suburbs.

The first route, M10 from Leichhardt to Kingsford, began operation on a 12-month trial basis on 12 October 2008 and was operated by State Transit. During this period nine regular and six high-capacity buses with different seating arrangements were dedicated to the route.

In March 2009, an expansion of the Metrobus network with the addition of four further routes serving the inner suburbs (M20, M30, M40, M50) was announced.

In July 2010 it was announced a further eight new Metrobus routes were to be rolled out in 2011 to service suburbs in Sydney's west, north, north-west, south and south-west (M41, M52, M54, M60, M61, M90, M91, M92). This saw Hillsbus and Veolia Transport (later Transdev NSW) also become Metrobus operators.

Routes M10, M20, M30, M41 and M50 were included in the transfer of region 6 from State Transit to Transit Systems on 1 July 2018.

During April and May 2019, as part of the opening of Sydney Metro, a number of Metrobus services were renumbered to 3-digit numerical routes, dropping the "M" prefix. Two others were renumbered in February 2020.

During July and August 2023, route M92 was included in the transfer of region 10 from Transdev NSW to U-Go Mobility, while routes M90 and M91 were included in the transfer of region 13 from Transdev NSW to Transit Systems. M92 was later split up into routes 920 and 960 in September that year.

In June 2026, route M91 was withdrawn and split into two routes, 910 and 950.

=== Operational history ===
Operational history by route number
Route	Commenced	Ceased	Notes
M10	12 October 2008	24 October 2020	withdrawn
M20	26 October 2009	8 February 2020	renumbered 320, later split into 320 and 119
M30	28 March 2010	8 February 2020	renumbered 430, later split into 430 and 100
M40	18 July 2010	27 April 2019	renumbered 340, later 120
M41	9 December 2010	27 April 2019	renumbered 410
M50	31 October 2010	24 October 2020	withdrawn
M52	8 August 2010	24 January 2021	split into 500X and 501, later renumbered 52
M54	10 October 2010	27 April 2019	renumbered 550
M60	7 March 2011	25 May 2019	renumbered 600, later split into 600 and 590
M61	20 December 2010	25 May 2019	renumbered 610X
M90	6 December 2010		
M91	7 February 2011	21 June 2026	Split into 910 (Parramatta to Bankstown Station) and 950 (Bankstown Central to Westfield Hurstville).
M92	14 March 2011	23 September 2023	split into 920 (Paramatta to Bankstown Station) and 960(Bankstown Central to Sutherland)

== Tickets and fares ==
Metrobus services have always used the same ticketing system as all other Sydney metropolitan buses.

At time of introduction, this was the MyZone system. The Opal card system was rolled out to all buses throughout 2013–14, and became the sole ticketing system when MyZone was phased out in 2016.

Metrobus routes M10, M20, M30, M40, M50 were full-time pre-pay only services since introduction and required passengers to purchase a ticket before boarding. All other routes gradually became pre-pay between 2018 and 2020, as all Sydney bus depots became cashless.

== Routes ==
=== M10: Leichhardt to Maroubra Junction ===
M10

Overview
- Operator: Transit Systems
- Garage: Leichardt; Tempe
- Began service: 12 October 2008
- Ended service: 24 October 2020
- Former operator: State Transit

Route
- Start: Leichhardt
- Via: Camperdown; Central station Museum station Taylor Square; University of New South Wales; Kingsford
- End: Maroubra Junction

Service
- Level: Daily

Route M10 ran from Leichhardt to Maroubra Junction via Parramatta Road and Anzac Parade, and commenced on 12 October 2008. Route M10 connected with Sydney Trains services at Central and Museum. It also allowed passengers to transfer to regular buses to outer suburbs of Sydney at major transport interchanges such as Broadway, Railway Square, Cleveland Street and Kingsford.

On 28 December 2008, route M10 was curtailed to Leichhardt Town Hall, no longer operating to MarketPlace due to issues raised by Leichhardt Council regarding buses laying over in Lords Road. On 14 November 2010, route M10 was extended to the corner of Norton and William Streets at Leichhardt Pioneer Park. On 26 October 2009, it was extended from Kingsford to Maroubra Junction. Route M10 originally proceeded up George Street before turning into Park and Elizabeth Streets. On 4 October 2015, to facilitate the construction of CBD and South East Light Rail, it was altered to operate via Pitt Street, Eddy Avenue and Elizabeth Street in the Maroubra Junction direction, and via Elizabeth Street, Hay Street and Pitt Street in the Leichhardt direction. Operation of the route passed from State Transit to Transit Systems with region 6 on 1 July 2018. On 9 February 2020, M10 was altered to run via Rawson Place, stopping at Haymarket light rail/bus stop to allow cross-platform transfer to and from L2 and L3 light rail services.

It was originally proposed to abolish the city to Maroubra Junction section after the CBD and South East Light Rail was completed. On 25 October 2020, route M10 was withdrawn, with the western portion replaced by additional 440 services and the eastern portion replaced by L3 light rail and other bus services.

=== M20: Gore Hill to Botany ===
M20

Overview
- Operator: Transit Systems
- Garage: Leichardt; Tempe
- Began service: 26 October 2009
- Ended service: 8 February 2020
- Former operator: State Transit

Route
- Start: Gore Hill
- Via: North Sydney; Town Hall station Central station Green Square; Mascot
- End: Botany

Service
- Level: Daily

Route M20 ran from Gore Hill to Botany via the Pacific Highway, Town Hall station and Botany Road, and commenced on 26 October 2009.

It connected with Sydney Trains stations at St Leonards, North Sydney, Wynyard, Town Hall and Central. It also allowed passengers to transfer to regular buses to outer suburbs of Sydney at major transport interchanges such as Queen Victoria Building and Railway Square. Route M20 originally terminated at Mascot, before being extended to Botany shops on 27 February 2011. Short-working peak trips were later introduced between Wynyard and Zetland.

Operation of the route passed from State Transit to Transit Systems with region 6 on 1 July 2018. It was renumbered as route 320 on 9 February 2020 and cut back from Botany to Mascot. It was further cut back to Zetland in December 2021, as part of a restructure of the Eastern Suburbs bus network.

On 4 August 2024, route was again cut back, this time from the north, now operating only between Zetland and Central (Chalmers Street), to coincide with the opening of the Metro North West & Bankstown Line. The short section not served by the metro was replaced by a peak only route 119, operating between Gore Hill and North Sydney. On 8 December 2024, the route was amended to terminate at Railway Square instead of Chalmers Street.

=== M30: Taronga Zoo to Sydenham ===
M30

Overview
- Operator: Transit Systems
- Garage: Leichhardt; Tempe
- Began service: 28 March 2010
- Ended service: 8 February 2020
- Former operator: State Transit

Route
- Start: Taronga Zoo
- Via: Mosman; Cremorne; Town Hall station Central station Sydney University; Newtown station
- End: Sydenham station

Service
- Level: Daily

Route M30 ran from Taronga Zoo to Sydenham station via Military Road, Town Hall station and King Street, and commenced on 28 March 2010.

It connected with Sydney Trains stations at Wynyard, Town Hall, Central, Newtown and Sydenham. It also allowed passengers to transfer to regular buses to outer suburbs of Sydney at major transport interchanges such as Neutral Bay Junction, Queen Victoria Building and Railway Square. This service was originally planned to terminate at Enmore Park although Sydenham was chosen as a more appropriate terminus.

Route M30 originally operated between Town Hall and Central stations via George Street, but on 4 October 2015, to facilitate the construction of the CBD and South East Light Rail, it was diverted to operate via Park Street, Castlereagh Street, Hay Street and Pitt Street in the Sydenham direction, and via Pitt Street, Eddy Avenue, Elizabeth Street and Park Street in the Spit Junction direction. Operation of the route passed from State Transit to Transit Systems with region 6 on 1 July 2018. It was renumbered as route 430 on 9 February 2020. On 20 December 2020, route 430 was curtailed to operate between Sydenham station and Martin Place, with the rest of the route replaced by route 100 (operated by State Transit) between the Queen Victoria Building and Taronga Zoo. On 8 December 2024, 430 was further curtailed to loop at Central rather than going to Martin Place.

=== M40: Chatswood to Bondi Junction ===
M40

Overview
- Operator: State Transit
- Garage: Waverley; Willoughby
- Began service: 18 July 2010
- Ended service: 27 April 2019

Route
- Start: Chatswood station
- Via: Willoughby; Town Hall station Museum station Taylor Square; Paddington
- End: Bondi Junction station

Service
- Level: Daily

Route M40 ran from Chatswood station to Bondi Junction station via Willoughby Road, Wynyard station, Town Hall station and Oxford Street, and commenced on 18 July 2010.

It connected with Sydney Trains stations at Chatswood, Wynyard, Town Hall, Museum and Bondi Junction stations. It also allowed passengers to transfer to regular buses to outer suburbs of Sydney at major transport interchanges such as Chatswood, Queen Victoria Building, Wynyard, and Bondi Junction. M40 was renumbered 340 on 28 April 2019. On 4 October 2015, in conjunction with bus network changes to facilitate the construction of the CBD and South East Light Rail, it was diverted to operate via College Street and Park Street in both directions instead of via Liverpool Street and Elizabeth Street. M40 was renumbered 340 on 28 April 2019 and was withdrawn and replaced by route 120 on 24 January 2021.

=== M41: Hurstville to Marsfield ===
M41

Overview
- Operator: Transit Systems
- Garage: Burwood
- Began service: 19 December 2010
- Ended service: 27 April 2019
- Former operator: State Transit

Route
- Start: Hurstville
- Via: Bexley North station Clemton Park; Campsie station Burwood station Concord Hospital; Rhodes station Top Ryde City; Macquarie Centre
- End: Marsfield

Service
- Level: Daily

Route M41 ran from Hurstville to Marsfield via Bexley North, Clemton Park, Campsie, Burwood, Concord Hospital, Top Ryde City and Macquarie Centre, and commenced on 19 December 2010. It connected passengers to Sydney Trains stations at Hurstville, Bexley North, Campsie, Burwood, Rhodes, Macquarie Park and Macquarie University. It also allowed passengers to transfer to regular buses to outer suburbs of Sydney at major transport interchanges such as Hurstville, Top Ryde City and Macquarie Centre. Operation of the route passed from State Transit to Transit Systems with region 6 on 1 July 2018. M41 was renumbered 410 on 28 April 2019.

=== M50: Drummoyne to Coogee ===
M50

Overview
- Operator: Transit Systems
- Garage: Leichardt; Tempe
- Began service: 31 October 2010
- Ended service: 24 October 2020
- Former operator: State Transit

Route
- Start: Drummoyne
- Via: Town Hall station Central station Cleveland Street; Randwick
- End: Coogee Beach

Service
- Level: Daily

Route M50 ran from Drummoyne to Coogee Beach via Victoria Road, the Anzac Bridge, CBD, Fox Studios, Randwick Racecourse, Randwick shops and The Spot, and commenced on 31 October 2010. Route M50 connected with Sydney Trains stations at Town Hall, and Museum. It also allowed passengers to transfer to regular buses to the Moore Park area. This service was originally planned to terminate at Randwick although Coogee Beach was decided to be a more appropriate terminus.

Route M50 originally ran along Anzac Parade and High Street, passing through Kensington, University of New South Wales and the Prince of Wales Hospital. Due to construction of the CBD and South East Light Rail along High Street, in March 2017, route M50 was amended to operate via Alison and Belmore Roads. Operation of the route passed from State Transit to Transit Systems with region 6 on 1 July 2018.

It was originally proposed to abolish the city to Coogee section when the CBD and South East Light Rail was completed. On 25 October 2020, route M50 was withdrawn, with the western portion replaced by new route 503 (Drummoyne-City loop service) and the eastern portion replaced by L2 light rail and other bus services. The 503 was later abolished.

=== M52: Parramatta to Circular Quay ===
M52

Overview
- Operator: State Transit
- Garage: Ryde
- Began service: 8 August 2010
- Ended service: 23 January 2021
- Predecessors: Route L20

Route
- Start: Parramatta station
- Via: Rydalmere; Top Ryde City; Gladesville; Drummoyne; Town Hall station Martin Place station
- End: Circular Quay

Service
- Level: Daily

Route M52 ran from Parramatta to Circular Quay via Victoria Road, Top Ryde City, Town Hall station and commenced on 8 August 2010. It replaced route L20 and is supplemented by the 520 route outside of M52 operating hours.

Route M52 connects passengers to Sydney Trains stations at Parramatta, West Ryde, Town Hall, St James and Circular Quay. It also allows passengers to transfer to regular buses to outer suburbs of Sydney at major transport interchanges such as Parramatta, Top Ryde, Queen Victoria Building and Circular Quay. Route M52 originally proceeded down George Street. On 4 October 2015, to facilitate the construction of the CBD and South East Light Rail, it was diverted to operate via Park and Elizabeth Streets instead of George Street. On 24 January 2021, M52 was withdrawn and replaced by routes 500X and 501.

In June 2025, the state government announced that the 500X would be expanded to Parramatta to restore the connection of its previous service.. The route was restored on June 21 2026, as renumbered route 52.

=== M54: Parramatta to Macquarie Park ===
M54

Overview
- Operator: State Transit
- Garage: Ryde
- Began service: 10 October 2010
- Ended service: 27 April 2019
- Predecessors: Route 548
- Night-time: Yes

Route
- Start: Parramatta station
- Via: Carlingford station Epping station Macquarie University station
- End: Macquarie Park

Service
- Level: Daily

Route M54 ran from Parramatta station to Macquarie Park via Carlingford and Epping, and commenced on 10 October 2010. Route M54 replaced route 548, which was formerly Harris Park Transport route 624.

It connected with Sydney Trains stations at Parramatta, Carlingford, Epping, Macquarie University, and Macquarie Park. It also allowed passengers to transfer to regular buses to outer suburbs of Sydney at major transport interchanges such as Parramatta, Epping, and Macquarie Centre. On 5 June 2016, route M54 was extended to operate extra half-hourly services nightly between 8:00pm and midnight. On 6 May 2018, route M54 was extended to operate overnight services at an hourly frequency seven nights a week, thus becoming a 24-hour service. M54 was renumbered 550 on 28 April 2019.

=== M60: Parramatta to Hornsby ===
M60

Overview
- Operator: Hillsbus
- Began service: 7 March 2011
- Ended service: 25 May 2019
- Predecessors: Route 600

Route
- Start: Parramatta station
- Via: Baulkham Hills; Castle Hill; Cherrybrook; Pennant Hills station Thornleigh; Normanhurst; Waitara
- End: Hornsby

Service
- Level: Daily

Route M60 ran from Parramatta station to Hornsby via Baulkham Hills, Castle Hill, Cherrybrook, Pennant Hills, Thornleigh and Normanhurst, and commenced on 7 March 2011.

It connected with Parramatta, Pennant Hills and Hornsby Sydney Trains stations and other bus services at major interchanges Parramatta, Castle Hill and Hornsby. At commencement, M60 replaced daytime 600 services between Parramatta and Castle Hill which operated early morning and late night and one in the afternoon on weekdays and some limited 600 services between Parramatta and Cherrybrook. Other remaining 600 services were replaced on 3 June 2018. M60 was renumbered back to 600 on 26 May 2019. 600 was split into 600 (Parramatta to Pennant Hills) and 590 (Pennant Hills to Hornsby) on 3 March 2025.

=== M61: Castle Hill to Queen Victoria Building ===
M61

Overview
- Operator: Hillsbus
- Began service: 20 December 2010
- Ended service: 25 May 2019
- Predecessors: Route 610 (some trips); Route 610X (some trips)

Route
- Start: Castle Hill
- Via: Baulkham Hills; M2 Motorway
- End: Queen Victoria Building

Service
- Level: Daily with all night on Fridays and Saturdays

Route M61 ran from Castle Hill to the Queen Victoria Building via Baulkham Hills and the M2 Motorway and complemented the existing 610X service. It commenced on 20 December 2010.

It allowed passengers to connect with services to Kellyville, Glenwood, Kellyville Ridge, Bella Vista and Stanhope Gardens at bus stops along the M2 Motorway, as well as the Castle Hill Interchange. Route M61 originally continued south of the Queen Victoria Building to Railway Square via George Street until 4 October 2015 when it was curtailed to facilitate the construction of the CBD and South East Light Rail. In 2017, 610X services that ran between Castle Hill and City only were renumbered M61. M61 ceased operating on 26 May 2019 with all services renumbered 610X.

=== M90: Burwood to Liverpool ===
M90

Overview
- Operator: Transit Systems
- Began service: 6 December 2010
- Predecessors: Route 900
- Former operator: Transdev NSW

Route
- Start: Westfield Burwood
- Via: Strathfield station Chullora; Bankstown station Milperra; Moorebank
- End: Liverpool

Service
- Level: Daily

Route M90 runs from Westfield Burwood to Liverpool station via Strathfield, Chullora, Greenacre, Bankstown, Milperra and Moorebank, and commenced on 6 December 2010. Route M90 replaced the 900 service and connects with Sydney Trains stations at Burwood, Strathfield, Bankstown, and Liverpool. Operation of the route passed from Transdev NSW to Transit Systems with region 13 on 6 August 2023.

=== M91: Parramatta to Hurstville ===
M91

Overview
- Operator: Transit Systems
- Began service: 7 February 2011
- Ended service: 20 June 2026
- Predecessors: Route 910; Route 948
- Former operator: Transdev NSW

Route
- Start: Parramatta station
- Via: Granville station Chester Hill; Yagoona; Bankstown station Padstow station Peakhurst; Penshurst
- End: Hurstville

Service
- Level: Daily

Route M91 ran from Parramatta to Hurstville via Granville, Chester Hill, Yagoona, Bankstown, Padstow, Peakhurst and Penshurst, and commenced on 7 February 2011. Route M91 replaced the 910 and 948 services and connected with Sydney Trains stations at Parramatta, Granville, Chester Hill, Yagoona, Bankstown, Padstow, and Hurstville. Operation of the route passed from Transdev NSW to Transit Systems with region 13 on 6 August 2023.

On 7 June 2026, the state government announced that route M91 would be split into routes 910 and 950 on 21 June 2026.

=== M92: Parramatta to Sutherland ===
M92

Overview
- Operator: U-Go Mobility
- Began service: 14 March 2011
- Ended service: 23 September 2023
- Former operator: Transdev NSW

Route
- Start: Parramatta station
- Via: Lidcombe station Bankstown station Padstow
- End: Sutherland station

Service
- Level: Daily

Route M92 ran from Parramatta station to Sutherland via Lidcombe, Bankstown, Padstow and Menai and began 14 March 2011, it was the last Metrobus route launched. it connects with the Sydney Trains stations at Parramatta, Lidcombe, Bankstown, Padstow and Sutherland. Until December 2018, the route largely duplicated route 962 between Bankstown and Sutherland, with the difference that M92 bypasses Illawong and Menai Marketplace. The duplication ended with the rerouting of 962 to East Hills instead of Bankstown in December 2018. Operation of the route passed from Transdev NSW to U-Go Mobility with region 10 on 1 July 2023.

On 24 September 2023, M92 was withdrawn and replaced by routes 920 (between Parramatta and Bankstown) and 960 (between Bankstown and Sutherland). Transport for NSW stated the change would improve journey time and reliability for passengers, and would also allow drivers to complete other U-Go Mobility routes impacted by driver shortages.

== Fleet ==
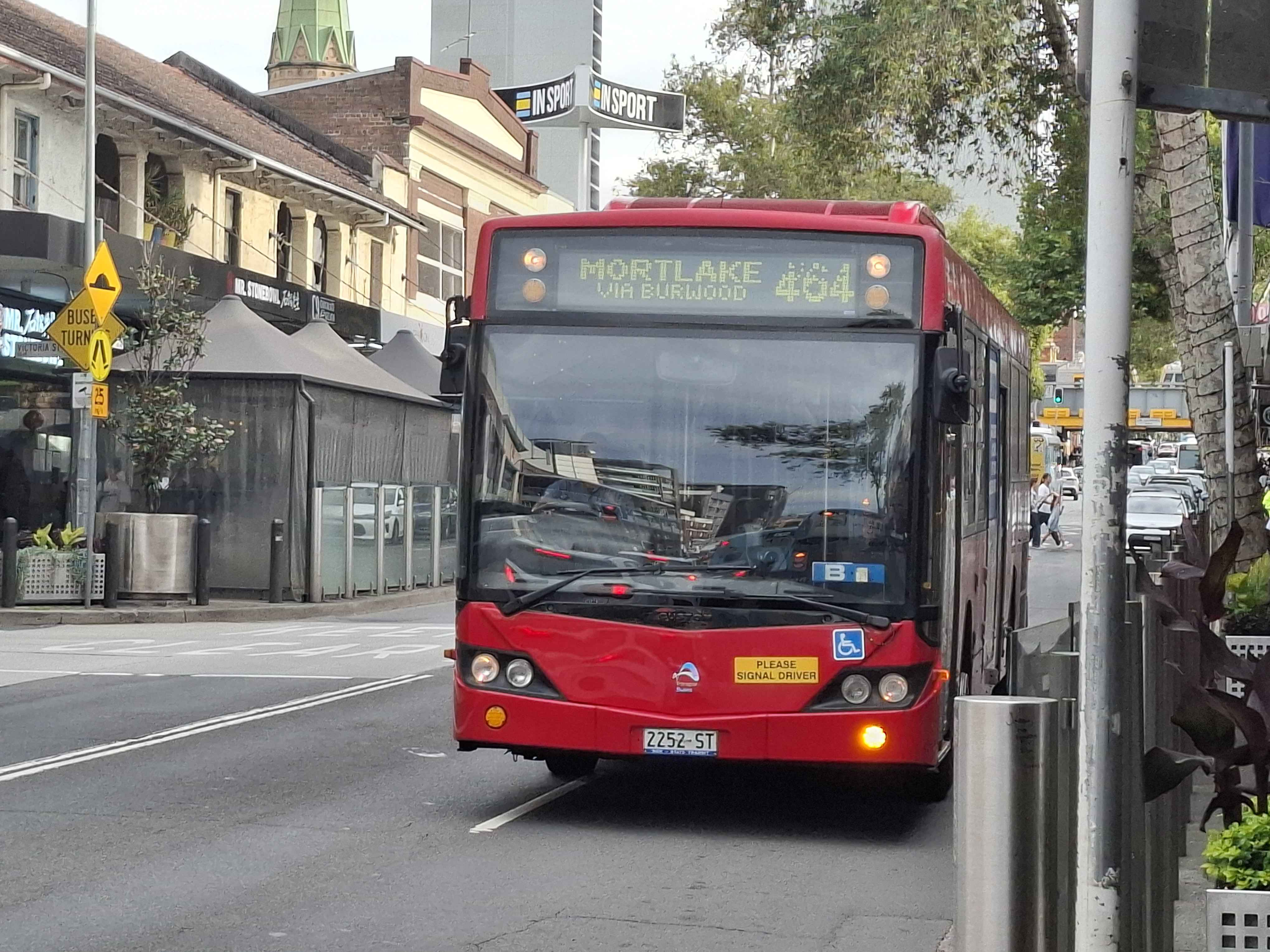
Repurposed Metrobus used for the 464 bus route to Mortlake

When operations commenced, services were operated by dedicated fleets in a red livery. As new buses have been delivered these have been painted in Transport for NSW's white and blue livery.

Many Metrobus have been repurposed as regular NSW transport buses with their Metrobus branding being removed but the bus keeping the same exterior and interior designs.
