= Sydney Bus Museum =

Transport museum in Sydney, New South Wales, Australia

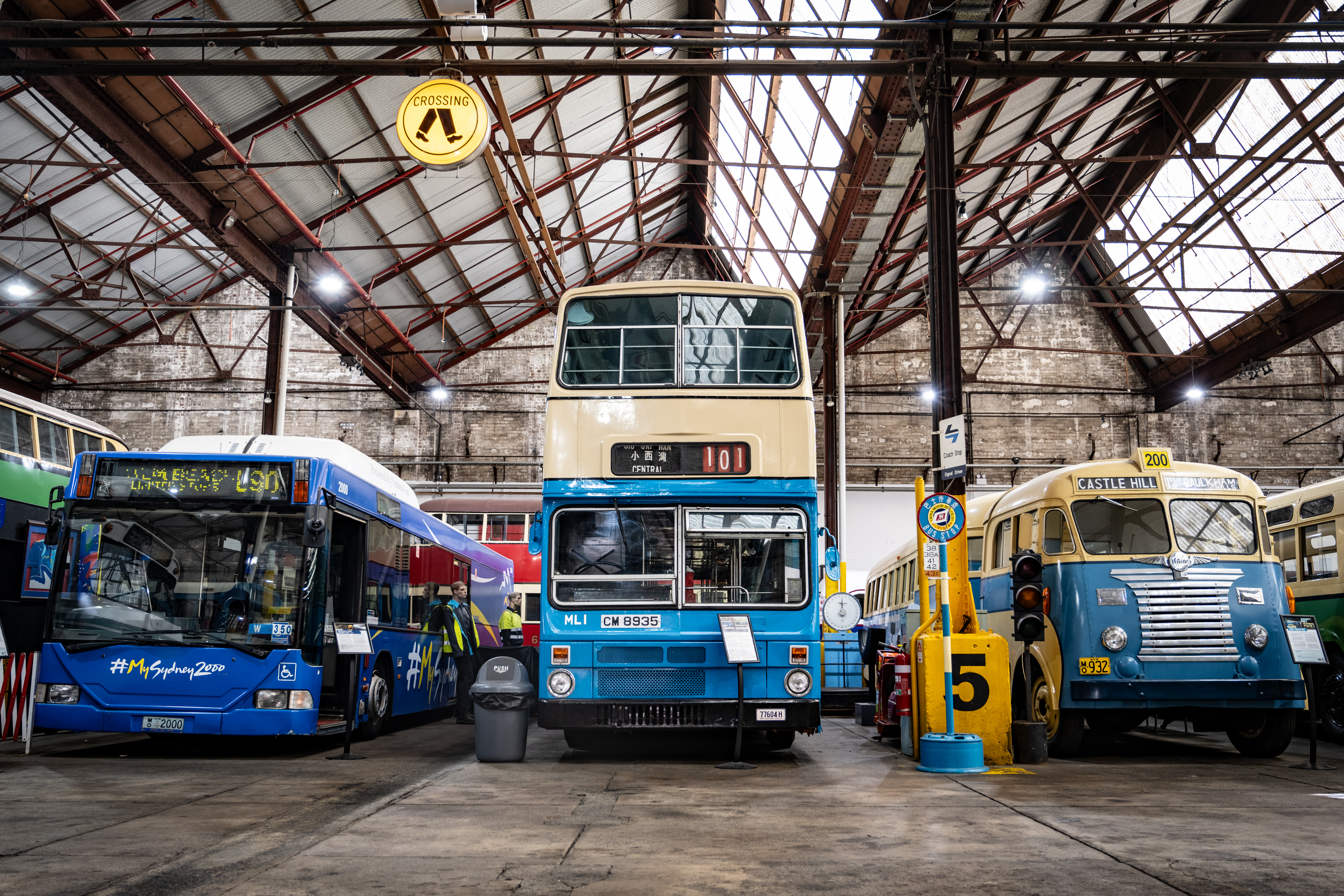
- Sydney Bus Museum in October 2023
- Established: 1986
- Location: 25 Derbyshire Road, Leichhardt
- Coordinates: 33.876509°S 151.158260°E
- Type: Transport
- Director: Peter Young (judge)
- Public transit access: Leichhardt North MLR station
- Website: www.sydneybusmuseum.com

Sydney Bus Museum (formerly the Sydney Bus and Truck Museum) is a not-for-profit organisation made up of over 200 volunteer members who preserve a rare, and invaluable collection of historic buses. The organisation also operate a transportation museum and education centre for public benefit located in the suburb of Leichhardt, in Sydney, Australia. The museum is open to the public on the first and third Sunday of each month.

The museum restores, maintains, displays and operates over 80 buses and support vehicles from the 1920s to 2000s. This mainly includes both single-decker and double-decker buses from Sydney and regional NSW, including both government and privately operated vehicles. The collection also includes double-decker buses from Hong Kong and London. It also provides buses for historical events, and has also had buses appear in film and photo shoots.

== History ==
The Museum originally opened in 1986 in the former Tempe Bus Depot, with a formal opening in April 1988. Following the State Transit Authority deciding to re-open the depot for its Metrobus operation, the museum was allocated space in a disused part of Leichhardt depot in 2010. As part of the move to Leichhardt, the museum was closed between 2010 and 2016. The new site at Leichhardt was officially opened by Transport Minister Andrew Constance on 1 August 2016.

== Publications ==
The Historic Commercial Vehicle Association launched an in-house journal in June 1965. HCVA News was a bi-monthly publication, becoming monthly in 1968. It was relaunched as Fleetline in August 1975, also becoming the house publication of the Bus & Coach Society of Victoria (BCSV) at the same time. This arrangement ceased in June 1986 when the BCSV founded its own publication, Australian Bus Panorama.

In May 1990, Fleetline became the house journal of the Transport Enthusiasts Society of South Australia. In January 2004 Fleetline was relaunched as Australian Bus. Originally published bi-monthly, it became quarterly in January 2022. The final issue was published in November 2023.

== Gallery ==
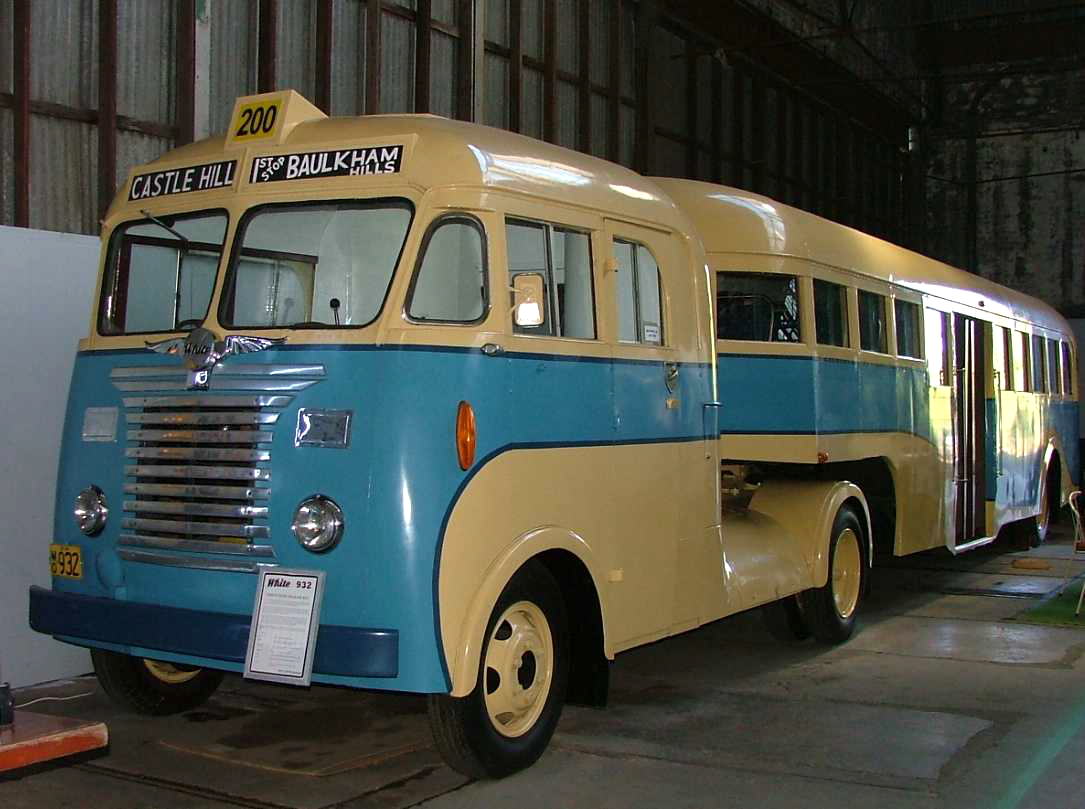

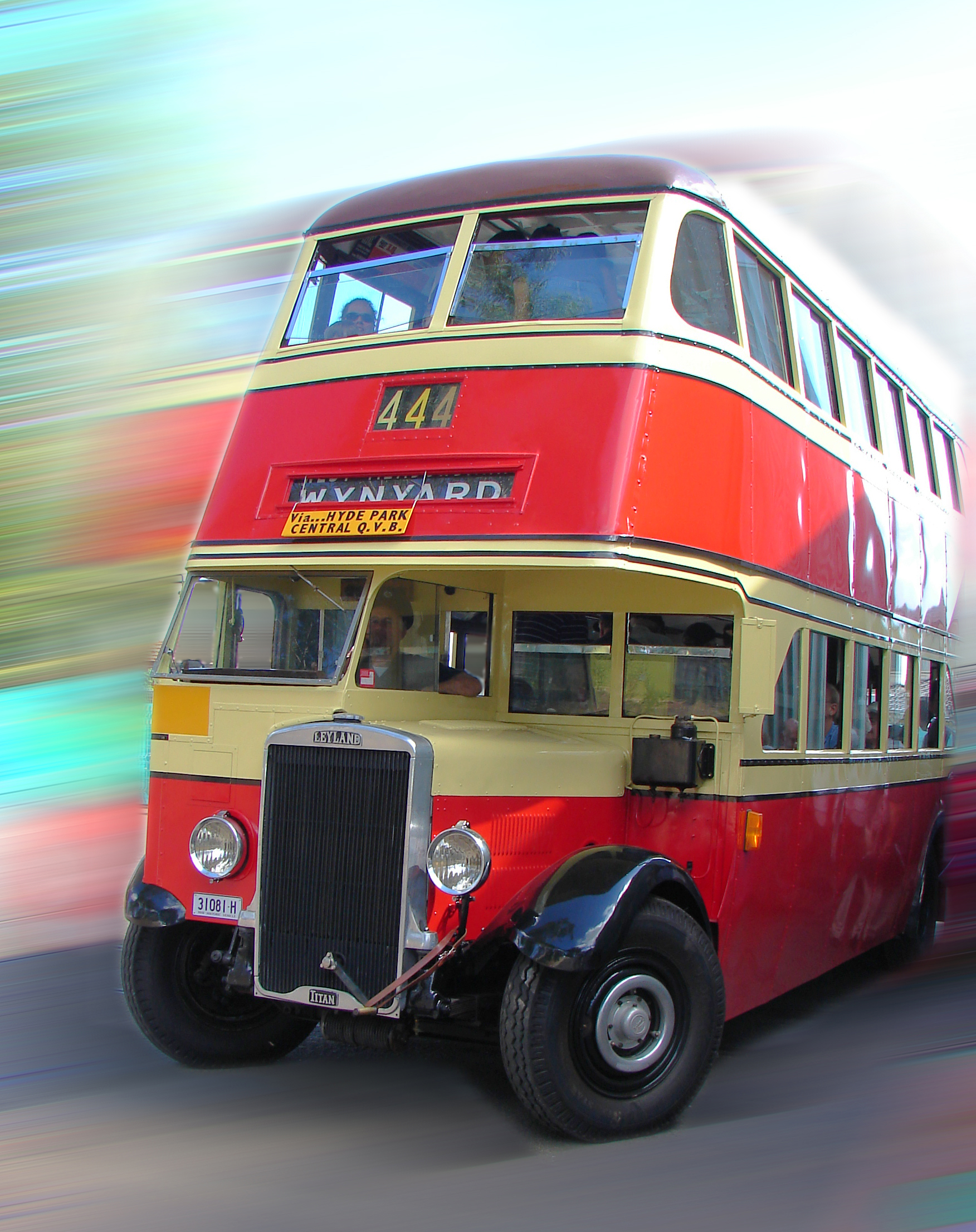
On a visit from the Bus Museum to the Sydney Powerhouse Museum

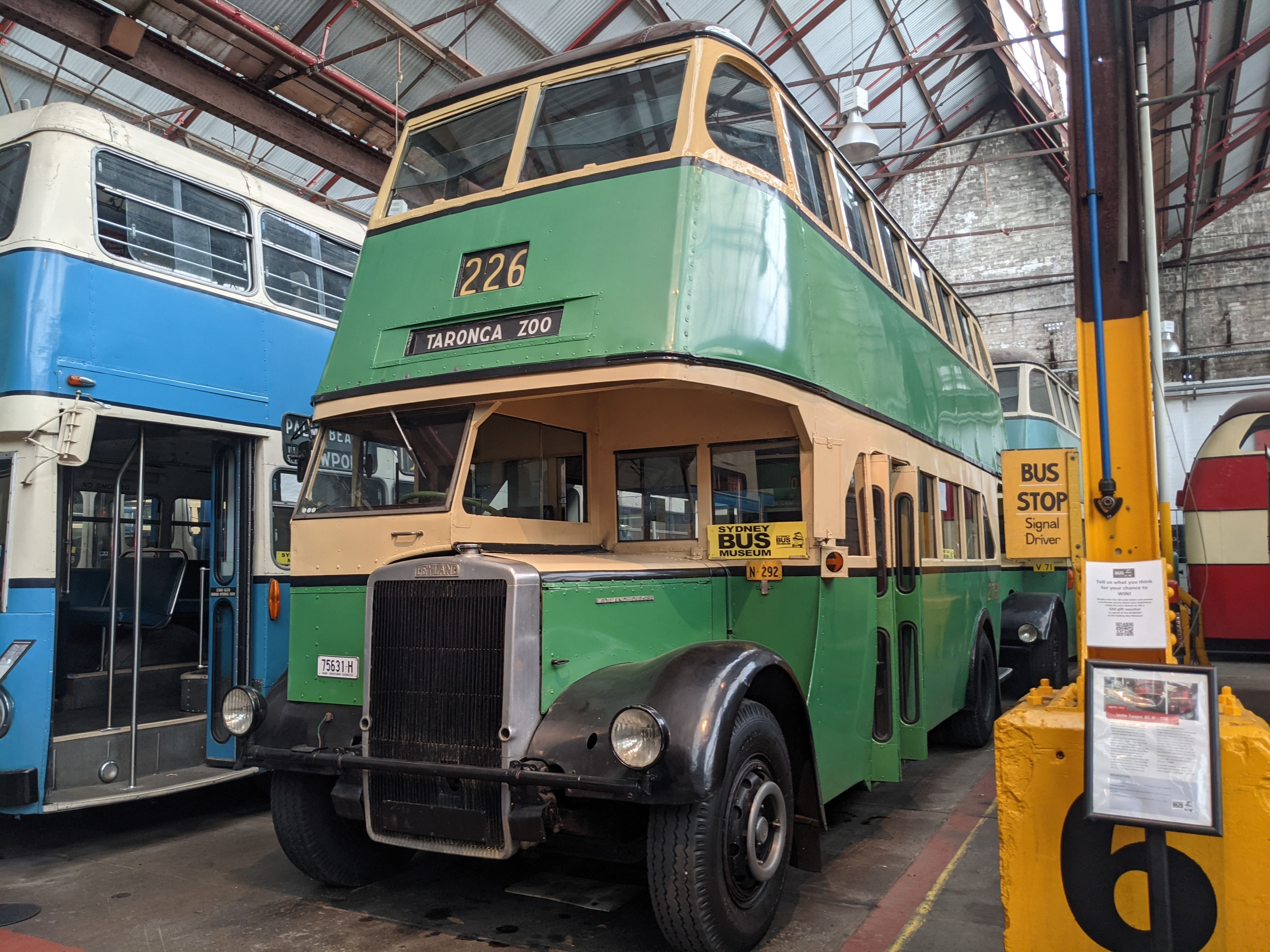
A heritage Sydney Leyland Titan double decker at the museum

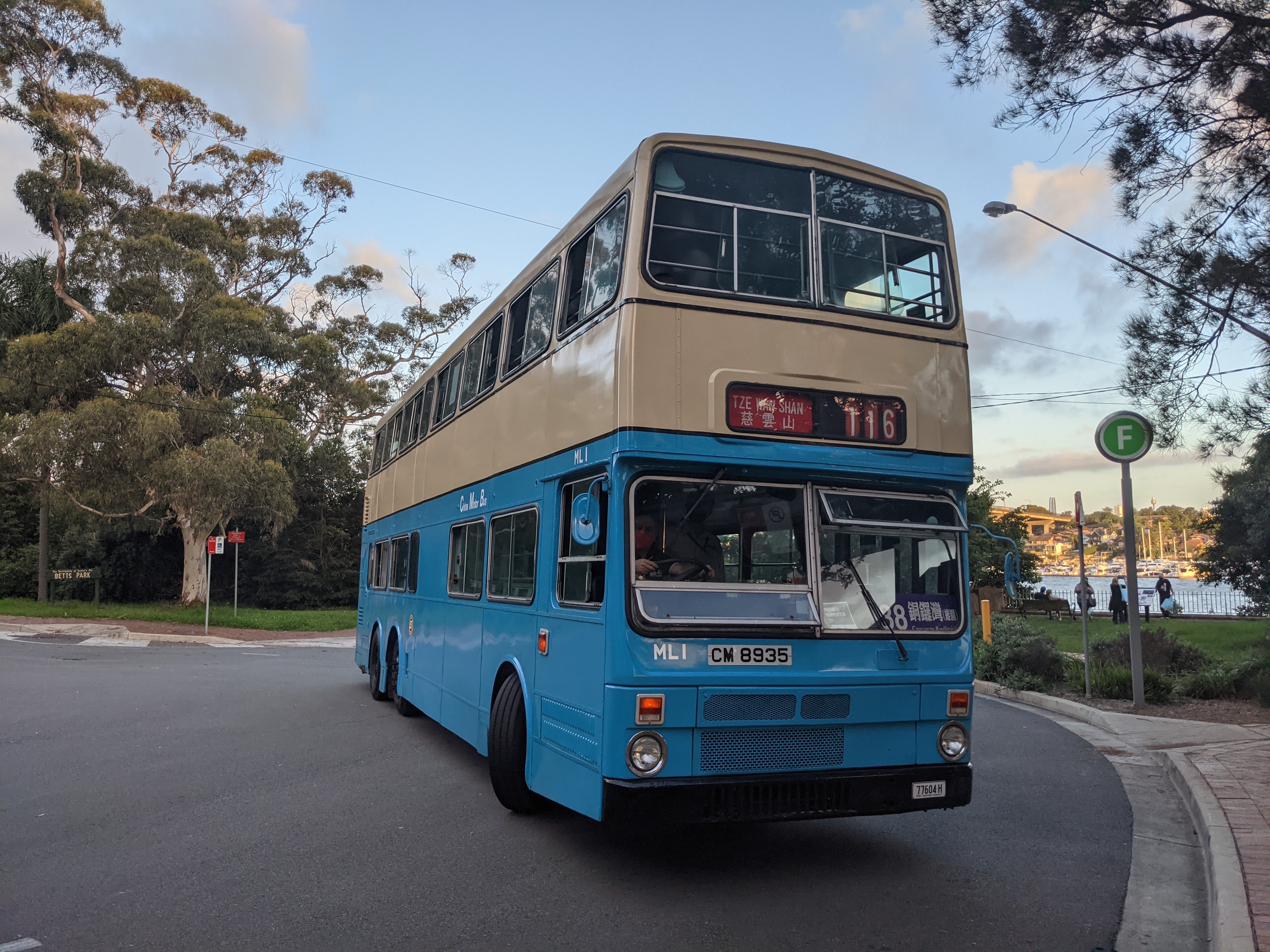
Hong Kong ML1 at Huntleys Point, in China Motor Bus livery

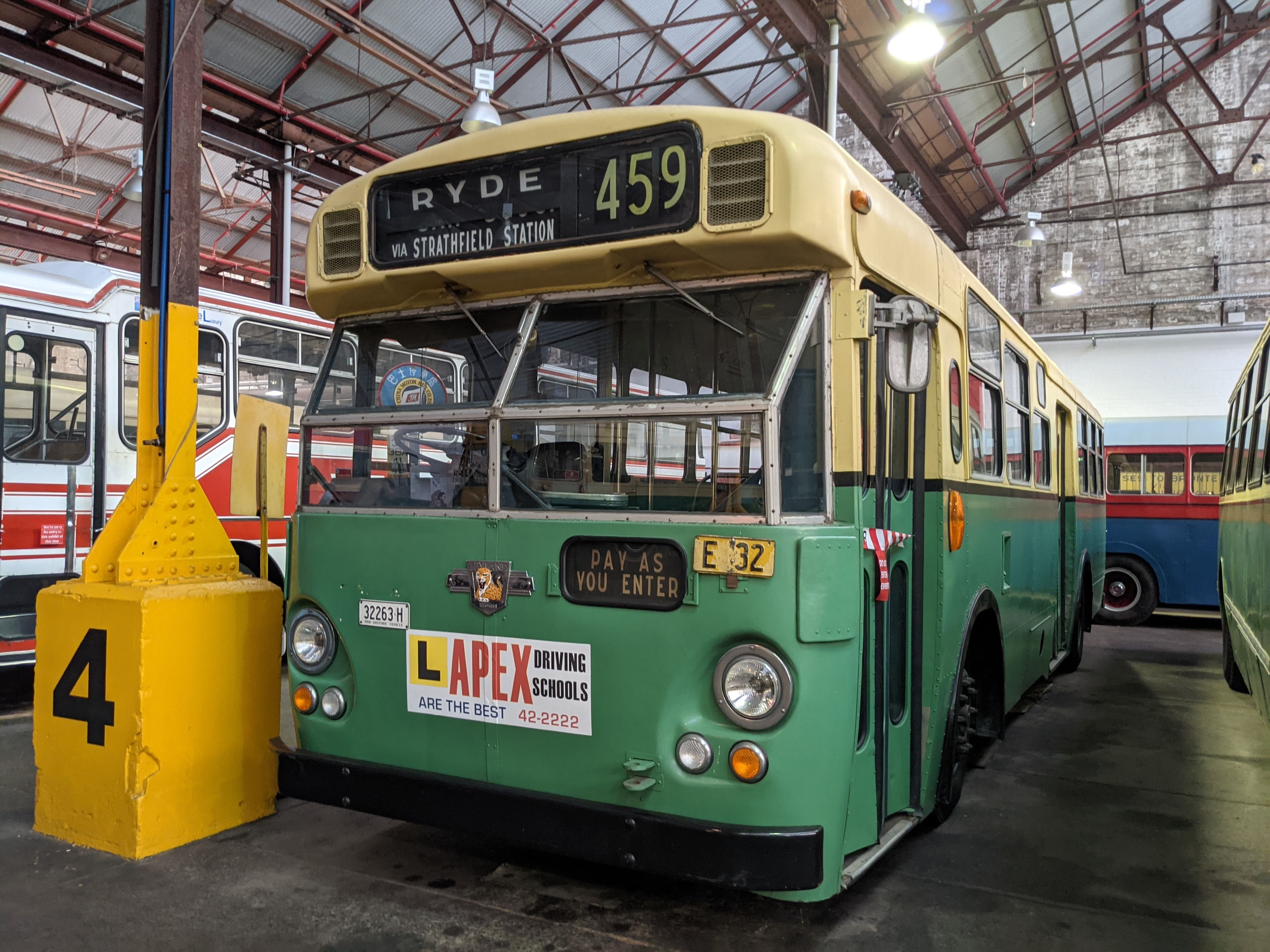
