= Chullora Bus Workshops =

Facility in Sydney, New South Wales, Australia

Operation
- Locale: Cnr Roberts & Norfolk Rds, Chullora
- Open: 30 June 1958
- Close: 1990
- Owners: Department of Government Transport (1958-1972); Public Transport Commission (1972-1980); Urban Transit Authority (1980-1989); State Transit Authority (1989-1990)

The Chullora Bus Workshops were the central workshops for the State Transit Authority and its predecessors, located on the north western corner of Roberts and Norfolk Roads Chullora.

== History ==
Chullora Bus Workshops opened on 30 June 1958 as the central workshops for the Department for Government Transport's bus fleet. Spread over 32 acres, it took over the function of performing all heavy maintenance and overhauls that had previously been performed at the much more confined Leichhardt Bus Depot.

Although primarily a maintenance facility, it did body an AEC Reliance and Leyland Leopard chassis in 1964. With newer vehicles requiring far less maintenance, overhauls at the workshops ceased in October 1989 with final closure in 1990. A smaller facility was established at Randwick for mechanical repairs with body repairs contracted to the private sector. The site was turned into a residential development.
