= Bus & Coach Society of Victoria =

Australian bus preservation society

The Bus & Coach Society of Victoria (BCSV) is a bus preservation society in Melbourne, Australia established in December 1968.

== Publications ==
From 1975 until 1986, the BCSV's house journal was Fleetline that was published by the Historic Commercial Vehicle Association. In 1986, the BCSV ended its involvement with Fleetline and founded two bi-monthly publications; Australian Bus Panorama and Australian Bus Heritage.
