= Chullora =

Suburb in New South Wales, Australia

- Suburb
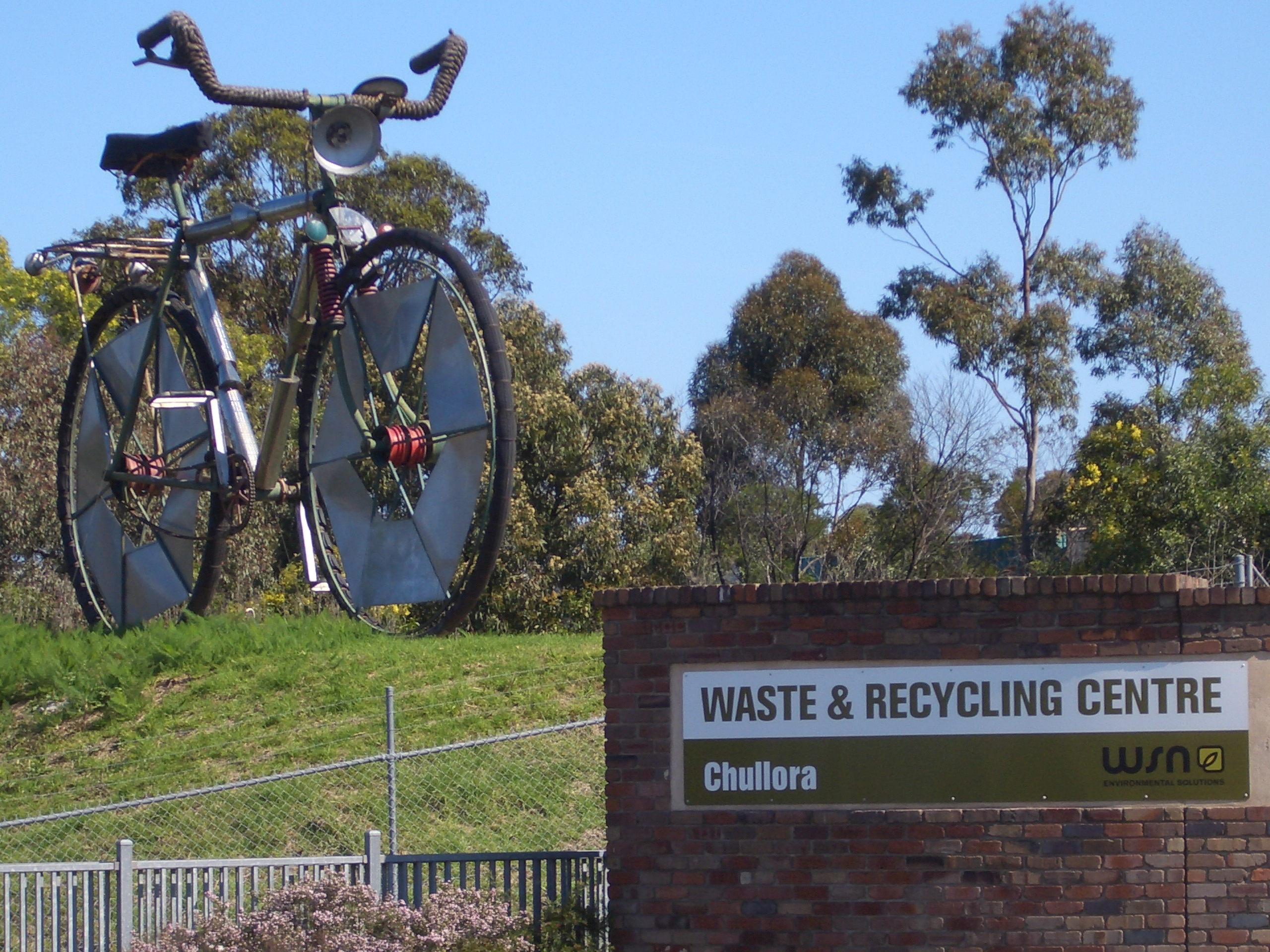
- "The Big Bicycle" at the old Chullora Recycling Centre

- Interactive map of Chullora
- Country: Australia
- State: New South Wales
- LGA: City of Canterbury-Bankstown
- Location: 15 km (9.3 mi) west of Sydney CBD

Government
  - State electorate: Bankstown
  - Federal division: Watson
- Elevation: 47 m (154 ft)

Population
  - Total: 14 (2021)
- Postcode: 2190
Suburbs around Chullora
Regents Park	Lidcombe	Rookwood
Potts Hill	Chullora	Greenacre
Yagoona	Bankstown	Greenacre

Chullora is a suburb in Western Sydney in the state of New South Wales, Australia. It is part of the City of Canterbury-Bankstown local government area, and is located 15 kilometres west of the Sydney central business district. The suburb is entirely industrial and commercial, and in the 2021 census recorded a population of 14.

== History ==
The suburb of Chullora was originally part of the area known as Liberty Plains, which was land given to the first free settlers who arrived in Sydney Cove on 6 January 1793. In the 1950s, many immigrants from Europe were housed in the area. Once established, they moved to other parts of Sydney. Chullora was the name used for one of the estates in this area. Chullora is an Aboriginal word meaning 'flour'. The construction of the Tip Top Bakeries has perhaps brought the suburbs back to its roots.

During World War II, Chullora was selected as the site for a major wartime manufacturing plant. The site once occupied several hundred acres of land surrounded by Rookwood Cemetery, Brunker Road, the Hume Highway and Centenary Drive. The site was said to have been the largest secret manufacturing plant in Australia which was used for the production of military weapons, plane components, tanks, HE Bombs and ordnance. Over two thousand men and women were employed to work at the factory on a daily basis. During the war the factory produced components for 700 Beaufort, 380 Beaufighter and up to 50 Lincoln aircraft. Over 54 ACI tanks were built as well as 60 General Lee tanks that were adapted for use in the Australian Military, as were local jeeps in the 1970s. The factory also produced 81 cupola turrets for the British Matilda tanks.

An underground "bunker" and tunnel system is located on this site. It is directly under a block of flats in Davidson Street and Marlene Crescent. The entrance to the "bunker" is by steel doors set in concrete into the hillside in a railway cutting which runs from alongside the railway line parallel to Marlene Crescent at a platform called the Railwelders and which leads under the block of flats. The doors to this "bunker" were welded up in the late 1980s. The steel doors are no longer visible, and the associated area has been back filled.

Apart from the bunker, there is also a network of storage facilities that extend under the railway workshop. Sometime between 1977 and 1978 the steel access doors were fitted with locks (Railway SL type). The airshafts for this "bunker" are still clearly seen from the Hume Highway and some of them are within metres of the roadway. It has also been alleged that a tunnel approximately 6 km (4 miles) long connects this complex with Bankstown Bunker (RAAF headquarters during World War II) on the corner of Marion and Edgar Street Condell Park. Access to this network of storage facilities was from a steel door, bolted into the side of a stormwater drain which runs along the old Roads & Traffic Authority building in Chullora. It then runs under the Hume Hwy and eventually under the rail workshop.

== Population ==
Chullora is part of a contiguous area with no or very low population between the Inner West area to the east and the Greater Western Sydney area to the west, alongside neighbouring suburbs like Rookwood and Sydney Olympic Park. In the 2021 census, it recorded a population of 14.

== Commercial area ==
Chullora is essentially an industrial area with many factories and warehouses, including Tip Top Bakeries and the OfficeMax Sydney warehouse at the Chullora Business Park. Chullora also houses the printing plants for Sydney newspapers and magazines. Nine Entertainment print the Australian Financial Review, Sydney Morning Herald and The Sun-Herald and News Corp Australia prints The Australian, The Daily Telegraph and The Sunday Telegraph. Chullora was the home to the headquarters of Dick Smith Electronics before its closure. A Big Bicycle is located outside the Chullora Recycling Centre and is a roadside attraction. In 2011, Volkswagen Group Australia opened their new national head office on Muir Road, complete with a parts distribution centre. Australia Post has a sorting and Distribution Centre located on the highway, the largest in NSW.

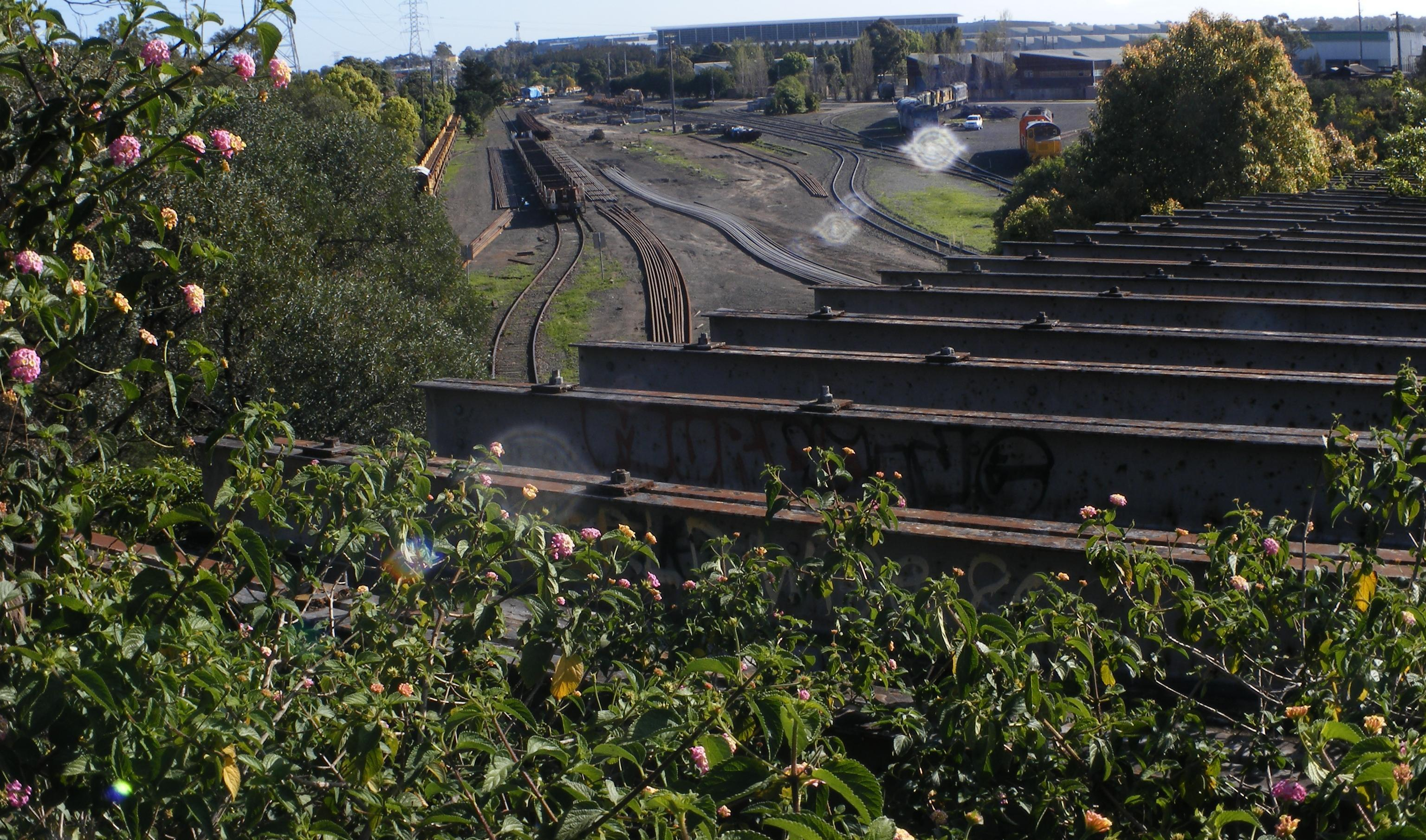
Chullora Railway Workshops

Chullora Market Place is a shopping centre on Waterloo Road in neighbouring Greenacre, but is named after Chullora.

The Chullora Railway Workshops and Electric Carriage Workshops previously serviced and repaired suburban and inter-urban trains, although this has now been outsourced to the private sector. Chullora does not have its own railway station. The Chullora Bus Workshops serviced the bus fleet of the Urban Transit Authority and its predecessors from 1958 until 1989.

== Transport ==
The Hume Highway is the main road that runs to the south of Chullora. To the south it is bound by Brunker Road. To the west it is bounded by Rookwood Road (A6).

Although a large part of Chullora is taken up by railway infrastructure, these are exclusively used for freight, and there is no passenger rail station in or around the suburb. Transit Systems operate bus services for this region. The nearest railway station is Punchbowl.

== Sport ==
The local football team is the Central Sydney Wolves, with their homeground at Lockwood Park.

== See also ==
- List of largest roadside attractions
