= Kingsgrove Bus Depot =

Bus depot in Sydney, Australia

- Interactive map of Kingsgrove Bus Depot

Location
- Location: Cnr Richland Street & Omnibus Road, Kingsgrove
- Coordinates: 33°56′11″S 151°05′50″E

Characteristics
- Owner: Transport for NSW
- Operator: Transit Systems
- Depot code: K

History
- Opened: 22 February 1948

Kingsgrove Bus Depot is a bus depot in the Sydney suburb of Kingsgrove operated by Transit Systems.

== History ==
Kingsgrove Bus Depot opened on 22 February 1948. It initially took over the operation of these routes from Burwood Bus Depot:

- 412 Belmore station - York Street City
- 415 Belmore station - Burwood station
- 470 Summer Hill station - Kingsgrove station
- 471 Bexley North station - Rockdale station
- 472 Bexley North station - Rodd Point
- 487 Canterbury station - Punchbowl
- 488 Canterbury station - Campsie station
- 490 Drummoyne - York Street City
- 492 Rockdale station - Drummoyne
- 493 Chullora Railway Workshops - Rockdale station via Kingsgrove station
- 494 Rockdale station - Drummoyne
- 495 Chullora Railway Workshops - Rockdale station via Bexley North station

As part of the contracting out of region 6, operation of Kingsgrove depot passed from State Transit to Transit Systems on 1 July 2018.

== Fleet ==
As of November 2026, it has an allocation of 168 buses.
