= Ryde Bus Depot =

- Interactive map of Ryde Bus Depot

Location
- Location: Buffalo Road, Ryde
- Coordinates: 33°49′00″S 151°07′21″E

Characteristics
- Owner: Transport for NSW
- Operator: Busways
- Depot code: Y

History
- Opened: 28 June 1953

Ryde Bus Depot is a bus depot in the Sydney suburb of Ryde operated by Busways.

== History ==
Ryde Bus Depot opened on 28 June 1953, the same day that Ultimo Tram Depot closed. It initially took over the operation of these routes, which were a combination of tram replacement routes and existing services operated by Burwood Bus Depot:

- 400 Ryde - Circular Quay
- 401 Balmain - York Street City
- 404 Ryde - Circular Quay via Central station
- 405 Drummoyne - Central station
- 406 Drummoyne - Circular Quay
- 407 Balmain - Central station
- 410 Chiswick - Central station
- 411 Chiswick - Circular Quay
- 413 Pyrmont - Central station

In December 1999 Sydney Buses purchased the business of North & Western Bus Lines whose depot adjoined. After initially operating as Gladesville depot, both were integrated. However because of the topography of the land, both remain physically separated with each having its own entrance.

In January 2022 it was included in the transfer of Region 7 from State Transit to Busways.

As of November 2026, it has an allocation of 276 buses.
