= Maroubra Junction =

Place in Sydney, New South Wales, Australia

Coordinates: 33°56′23″S 151°14′24″E

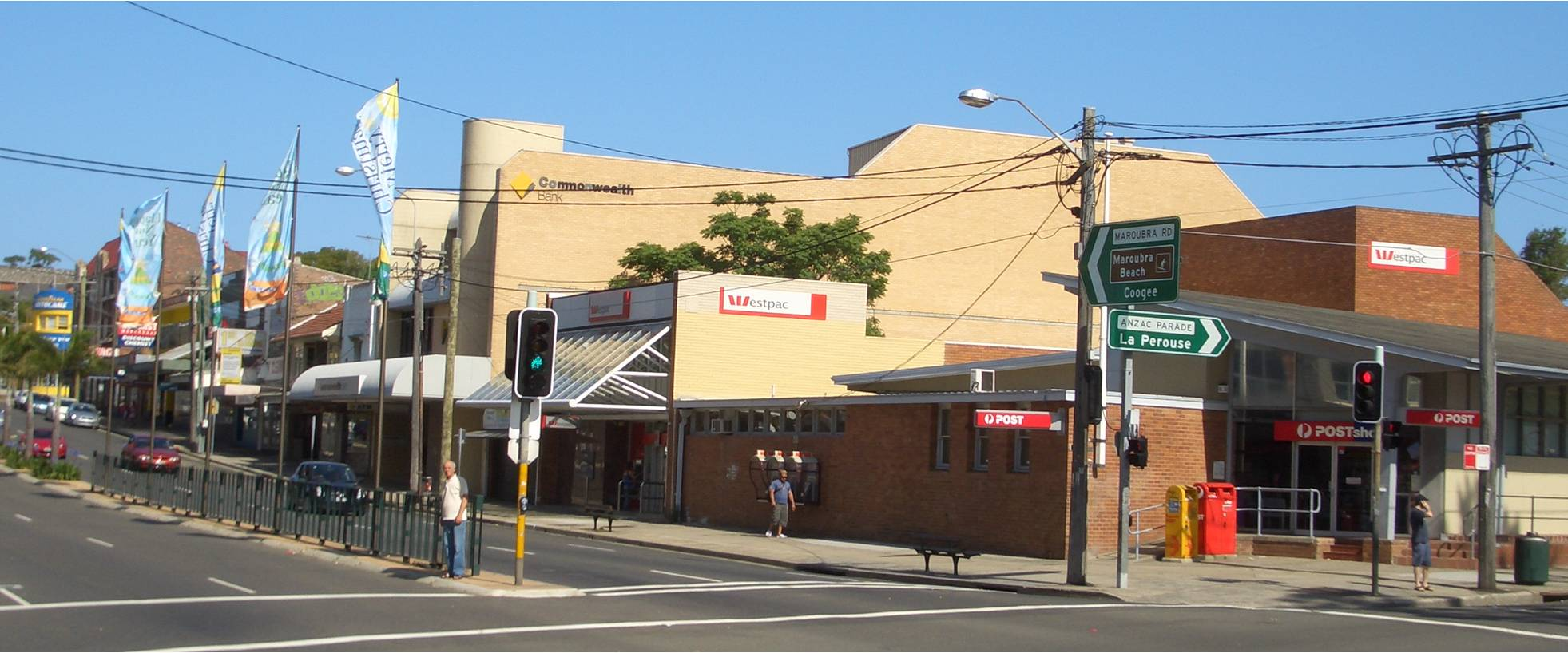
Maroubra Road, Maroubra Junction

Maroubra Junction is an unbounded locality of the suburb of Maroubra in Sydney, in the state of New South Wales, Australia. It is around the junction of Anzac Parade and Maroubra Road. Pacific Square is the major shopping complex in the area.

Maroubra Junction derives its name from the location of the former electric tramways junction for services to Maroubra Beach and La Perouse, which closed in 1961.
