= Tempe Bus Depot =

Bus garage in Sydney, Australia

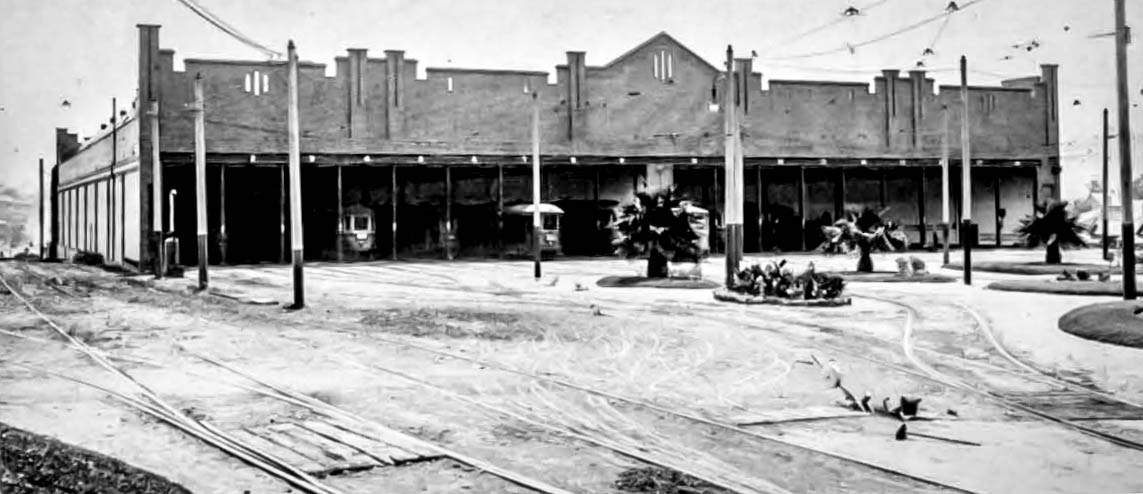
- Tempe Tram Depot circa 1920
- Interactive map of Tempe Bus Depot

Location
- Location: Cnr Princes Highway & Gannon Street, Tempe
- Coordinates: 33°55′28″S 151°09′36″E

Characteristics
- Owner: Transport for NSW
- Operator: Transit Systems
- Depot code: T

History
- Opened: 15 September 1912

Tempe Bus Depot (formerly Tempe Tram Depot) is a bus depot in the Sydney suburb of Tempe. It is currently operated by Transit Systems. The depot survived the closure of Sydney's former tram network and provided storage for the buses that replaced the trams.

== History ==
Tempe Tram Depot opened on 15 September 1912 as an eighteen road depot on the corner of the Princes Highway and Gannon Street, Tempe. It served the Cooks River, Marrickville and Dulwich Hill lines.

It closed on 20 November 1954 to become a bus depot, that in turn closed in January 1992. The tramshed and outlying offices were leased in 1986 to the Sydney Bus Museum, formally opening in April 1988. The forecourt was used to store withdrawn State Transit buses.

The Sydney Bus Museum relocated to Leichhardt in 2010, with the depot refurbished and reopened as a bus depot for Metrobus vehicles in 2010 but was subsequently also used for other buses. As part of the contracting out of region 6, operation of Tempe depot passed from State Transit to Transit Systems on 1 July 2018.

As of November 2026, it has an allocation of 99 buses.

== Design ==
The front elevation of the depot carries the wall beyond the ridges of the saw tooth roofs and the parapet line is broken by a centered gable and engaged piers. As a tram depot its design had:

- 18 tracks
- Decorative front parapet with centred pediment
- Brick panelled side walls
- Roof orientation to south

== Gallery ==
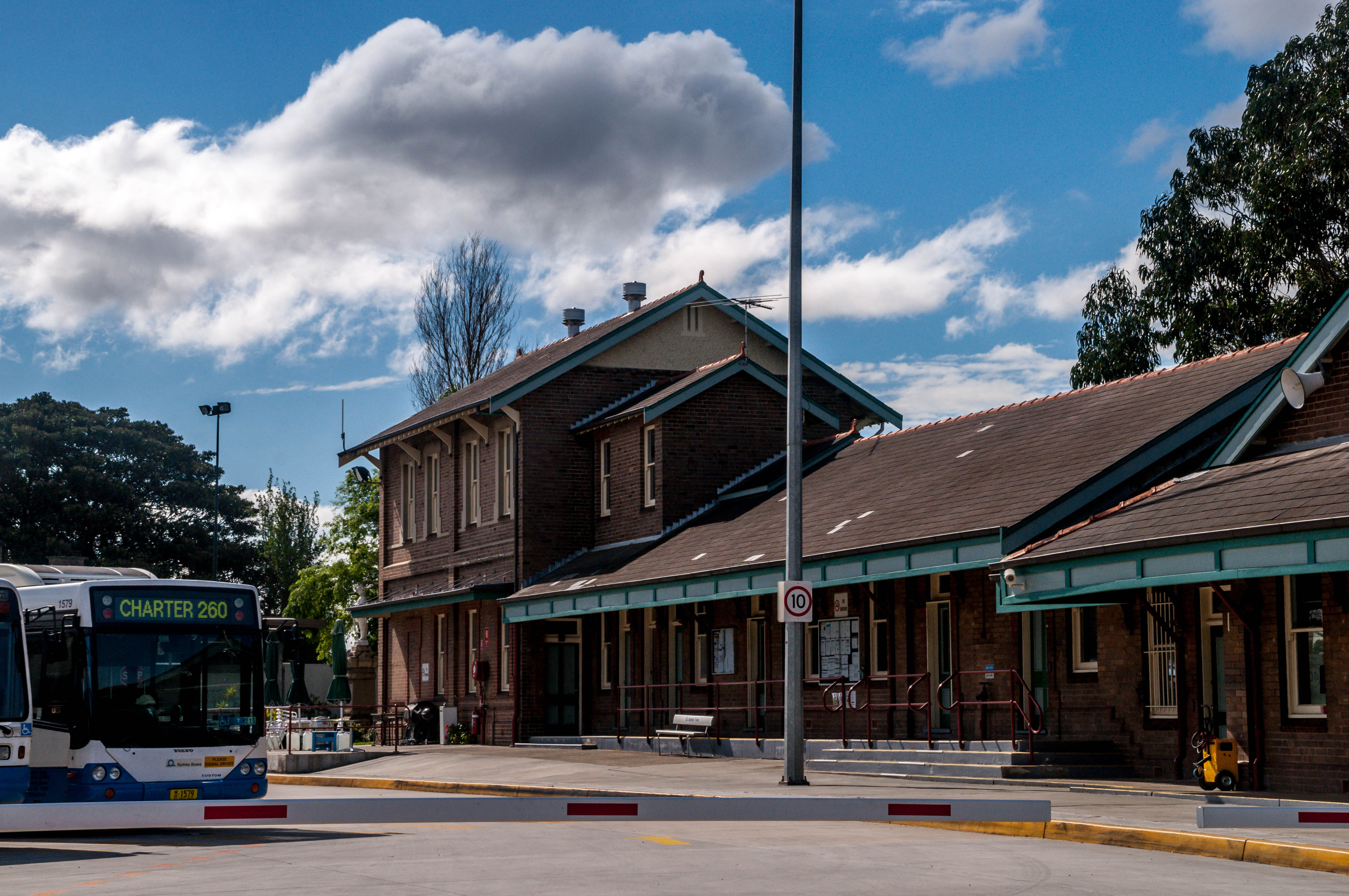
Depot offices

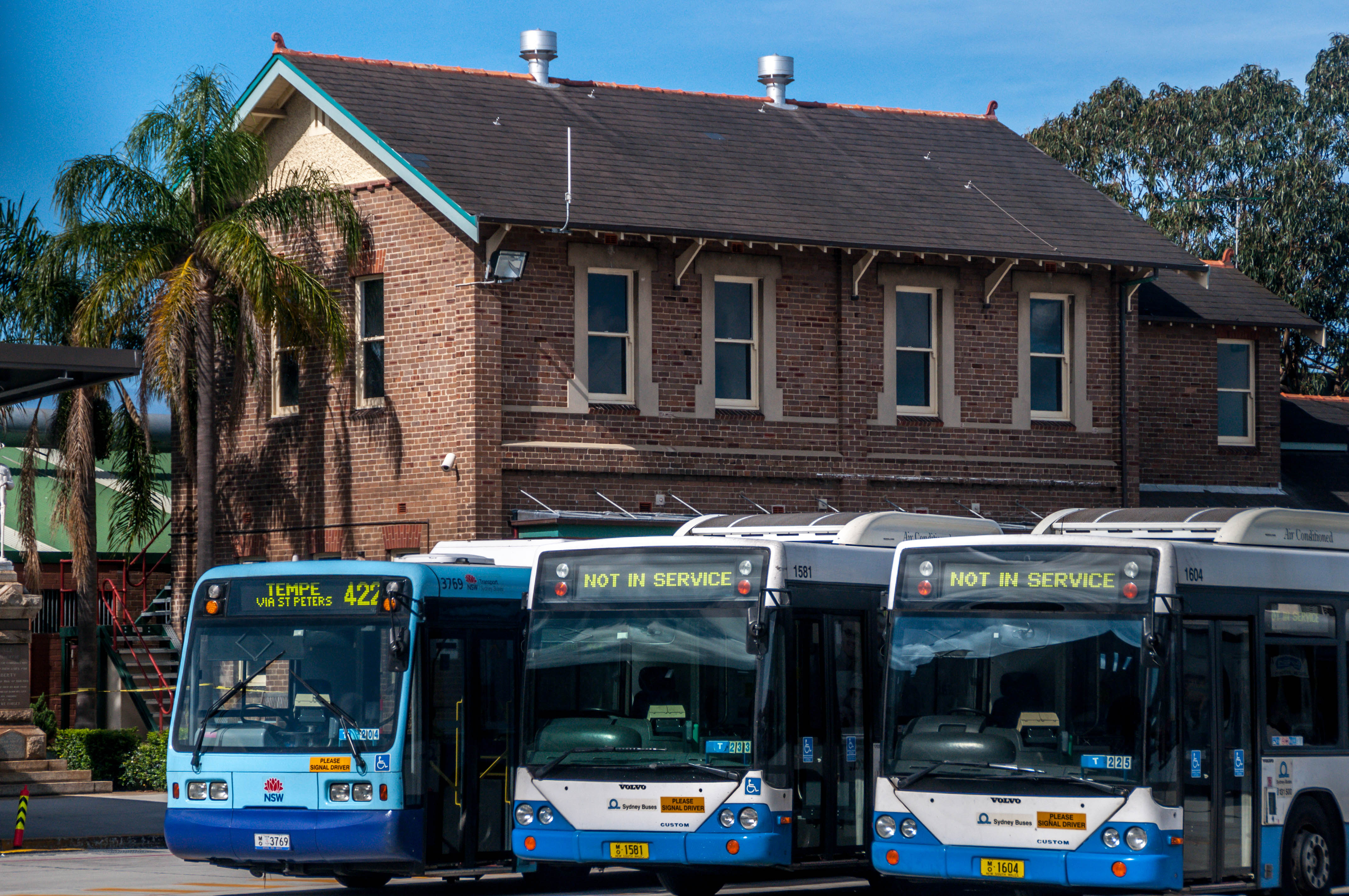
Traffic office

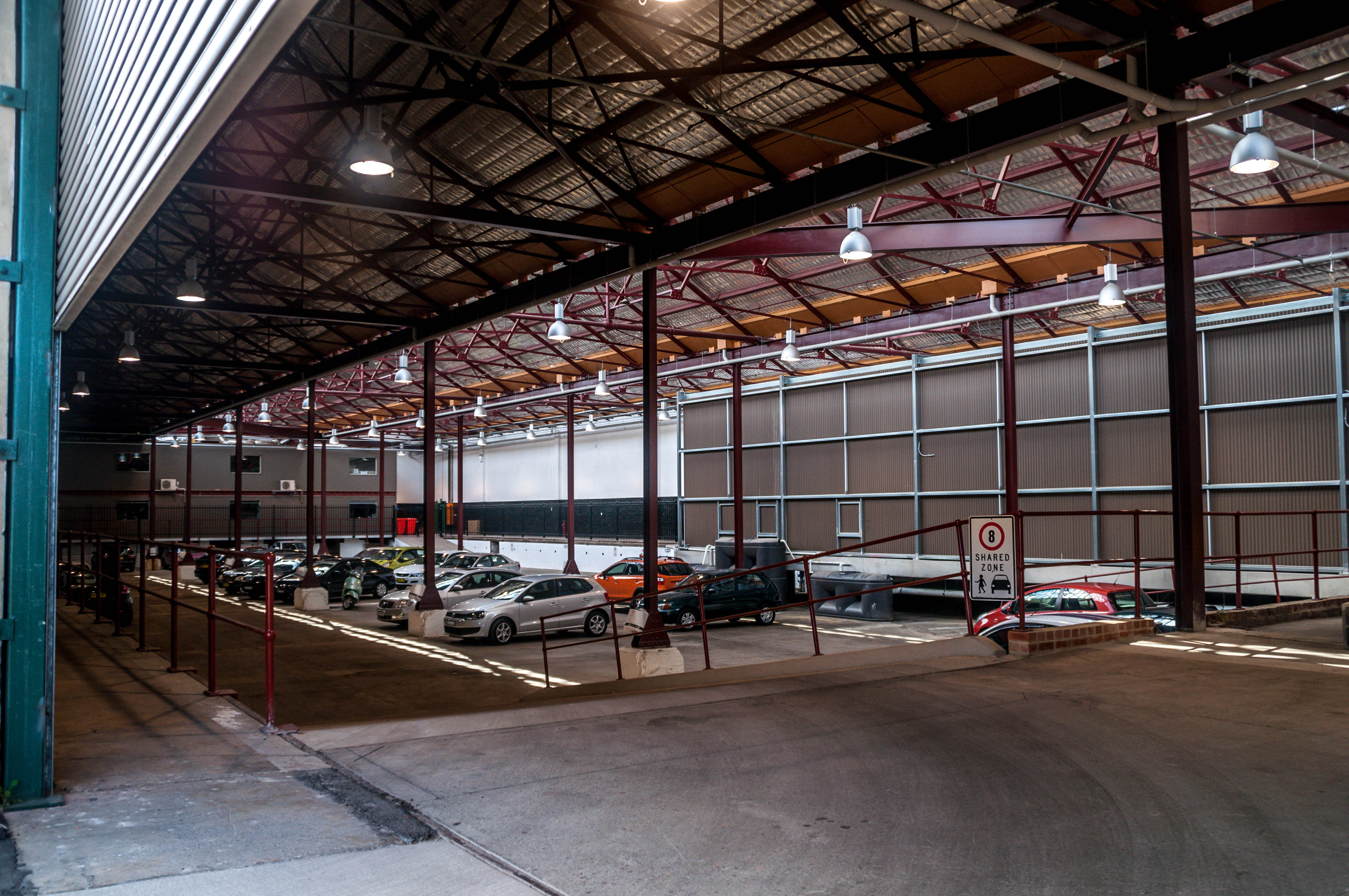
Tram depot shed interior

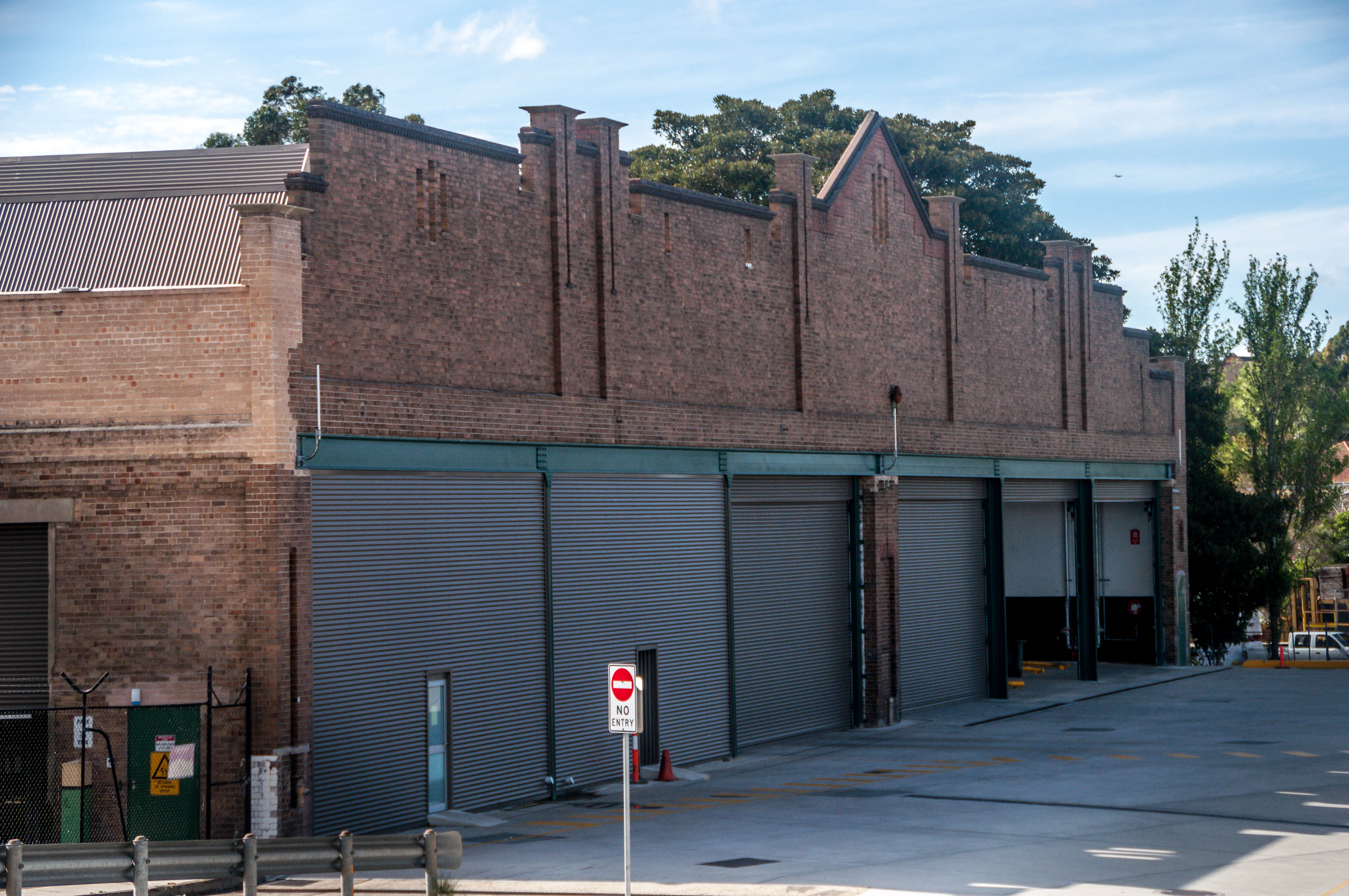
Decorative front parapet with centred pediment

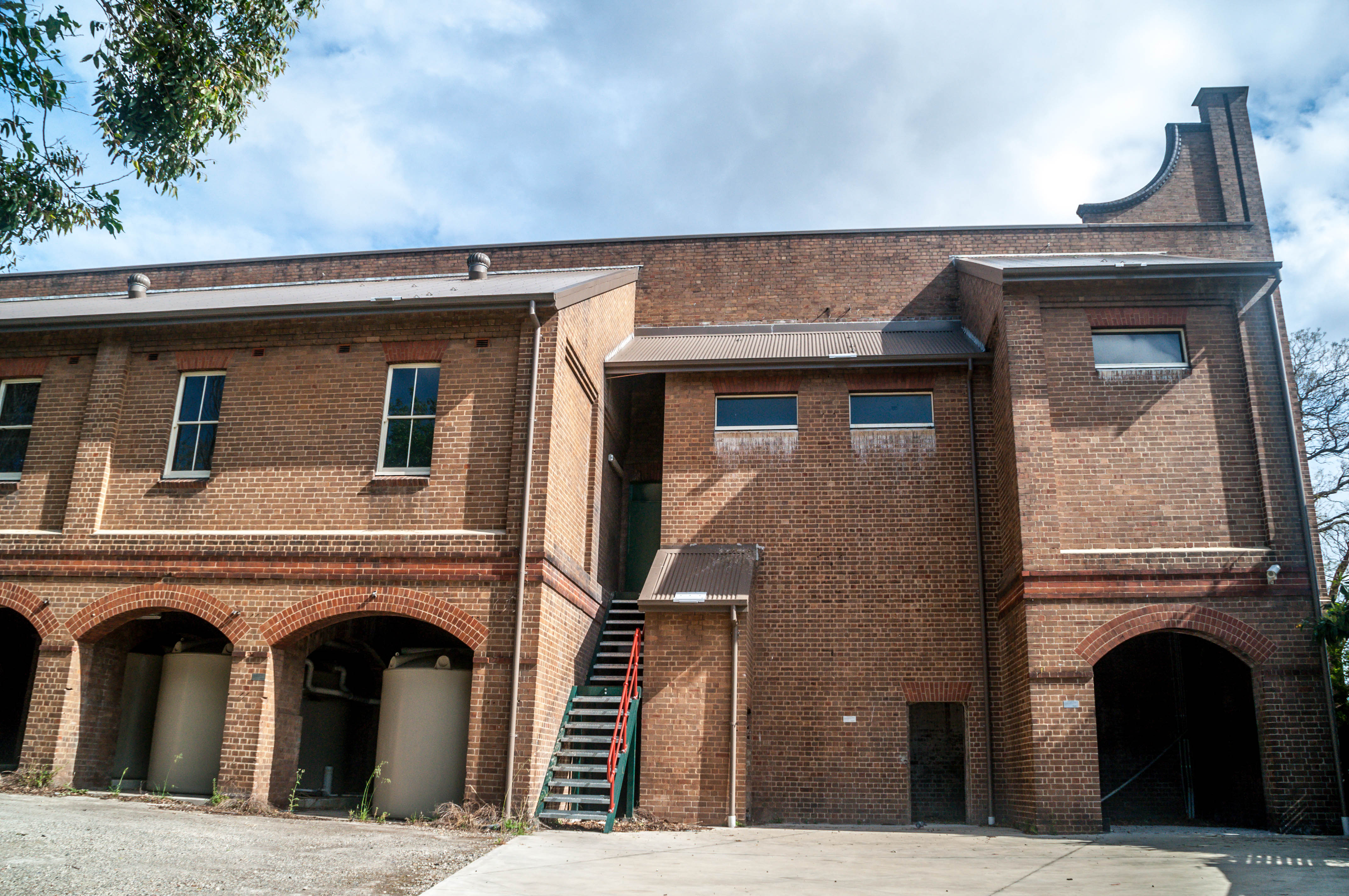
Tram depot shed rear

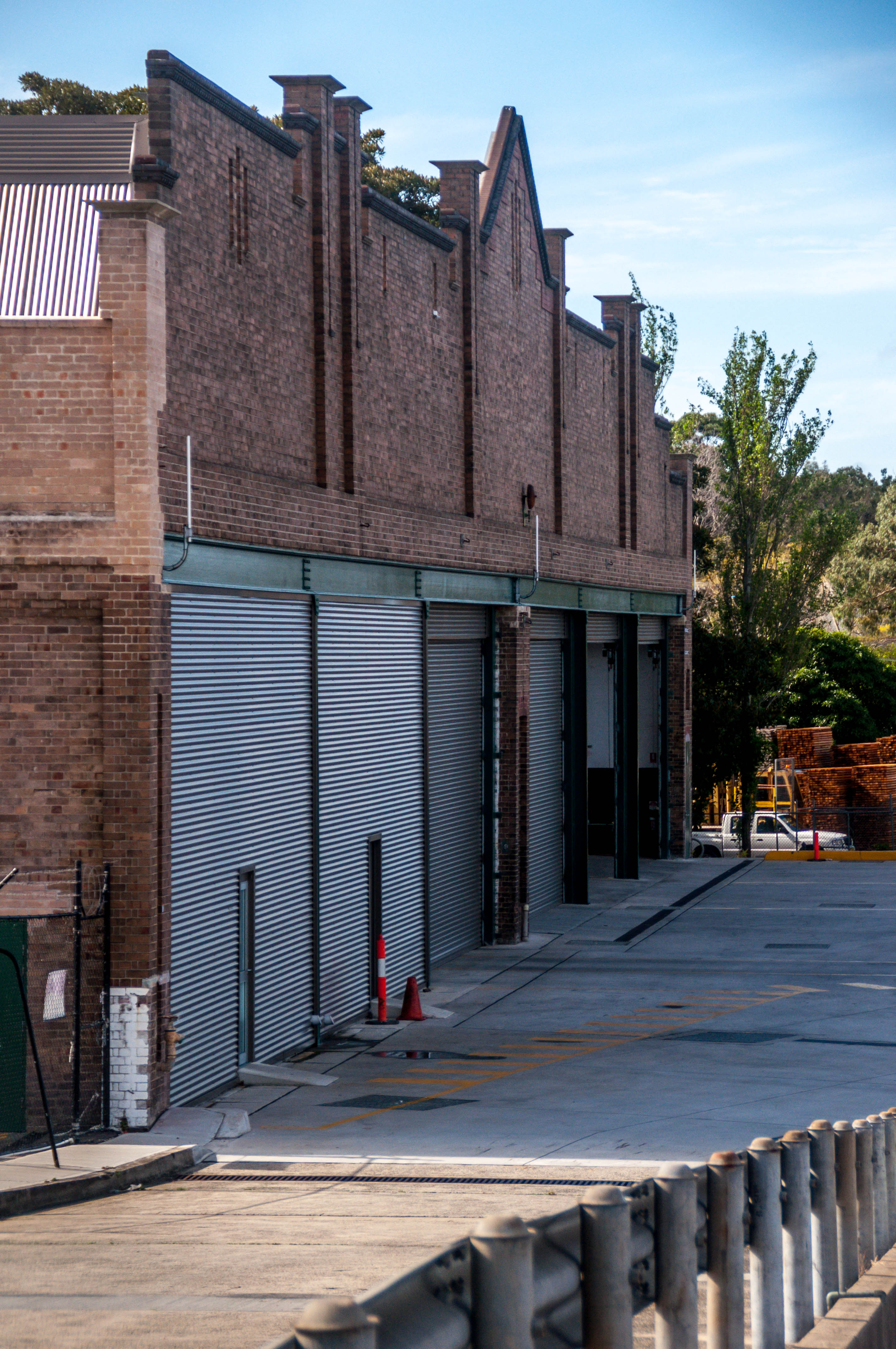
Tram depot shed
