= Leichhardt Bus Depot =

Bus depot in Sydney, Australia

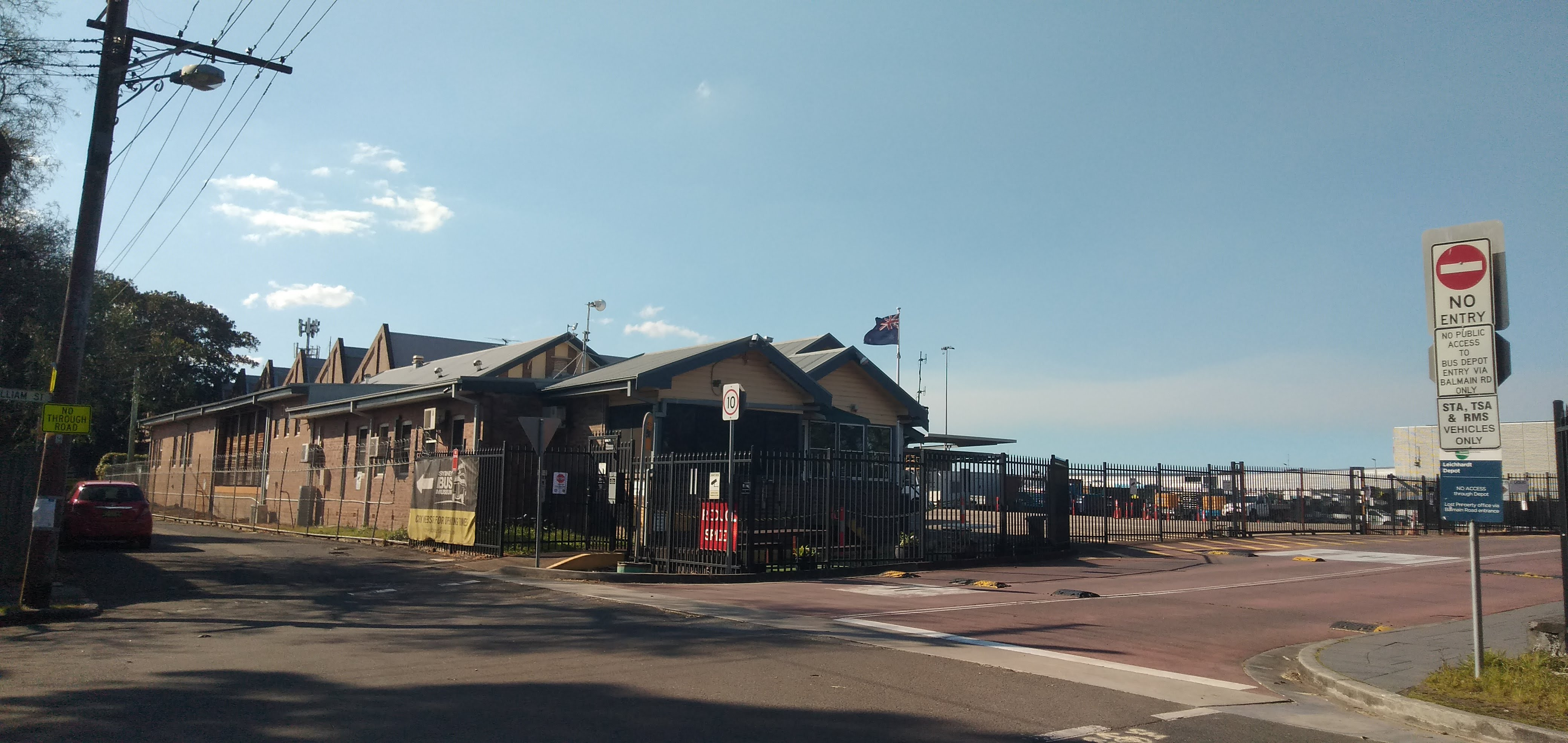
- Leichhardt Bus Depot in 2021
- Interactive map of Leichhardt Bus Depot

Location
- Location: Cnr William Street & Derbyshire Road, Leichhardt
- Coordinates: 33°52′34″S 151°09′34″E

Characteristics
- Owner: Transport for NSW
- Operator: Transit Systems
- Depot code: L

History
- Opened: 22 June 1915

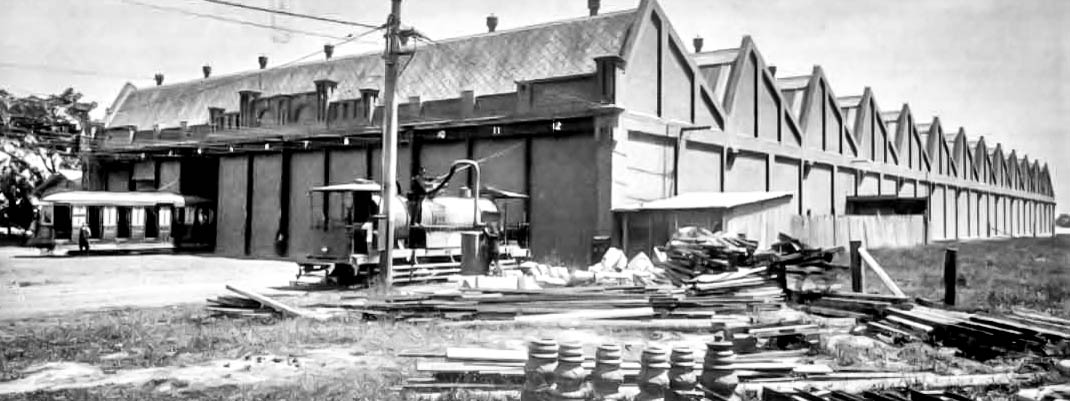
Leichhardt Tram Depot circa 1920

Leichhardt Bus Depot, originally Leichhardt Tram Depot, is a bus depot in the Sydney, Australia, suburb of Leichhardt operated by Transit Systems.

== History ==
Leichhardt Tram Depot was built as a twelve road depot on the corner of William Street and Derbyshire Road, Leichhardt, being available for use on 22 June 1915. It was never used as an operational tram depot, instead being used to store trams.

It was converted to a bus depot in 1937. It was also the central maintenance facility until the Chullora Bus Workshops opened in 1958. The old tramshed is used as part of the new expanded Leichhardt Bus Depot while the Sydney Bus Museum occupies the northern bays after its relocation from Tempe Bus Depot. Both the former Cable Stores Building and Traffic Office (also known as the Tram Depot Office) was proposed as part of the cancelled Leichhardt Police Station development.

The depot is also home to the Roads & Maritime Services barrier transfer machine that moves the central barrier on Victoria Road between the Gladesville and Iron Cove Bridges.

As part of the contracting out of region 6, operation of Leichhardt depot passed from State Transit to Transit Systems on 1 July 2018.

In November 2026, it had an allocation of 194 buses.

== Design ==
As a tram depot, its design had some unique features such as the roller doors, and ancillary store and workshop buildings plus:

- 12 tracks
- Decorative front parapet
- Brick panelled side walls
- Saw-tooth Roof orientation to south
