= Transit Systems NSW =

Bus company in Sydney, Australia

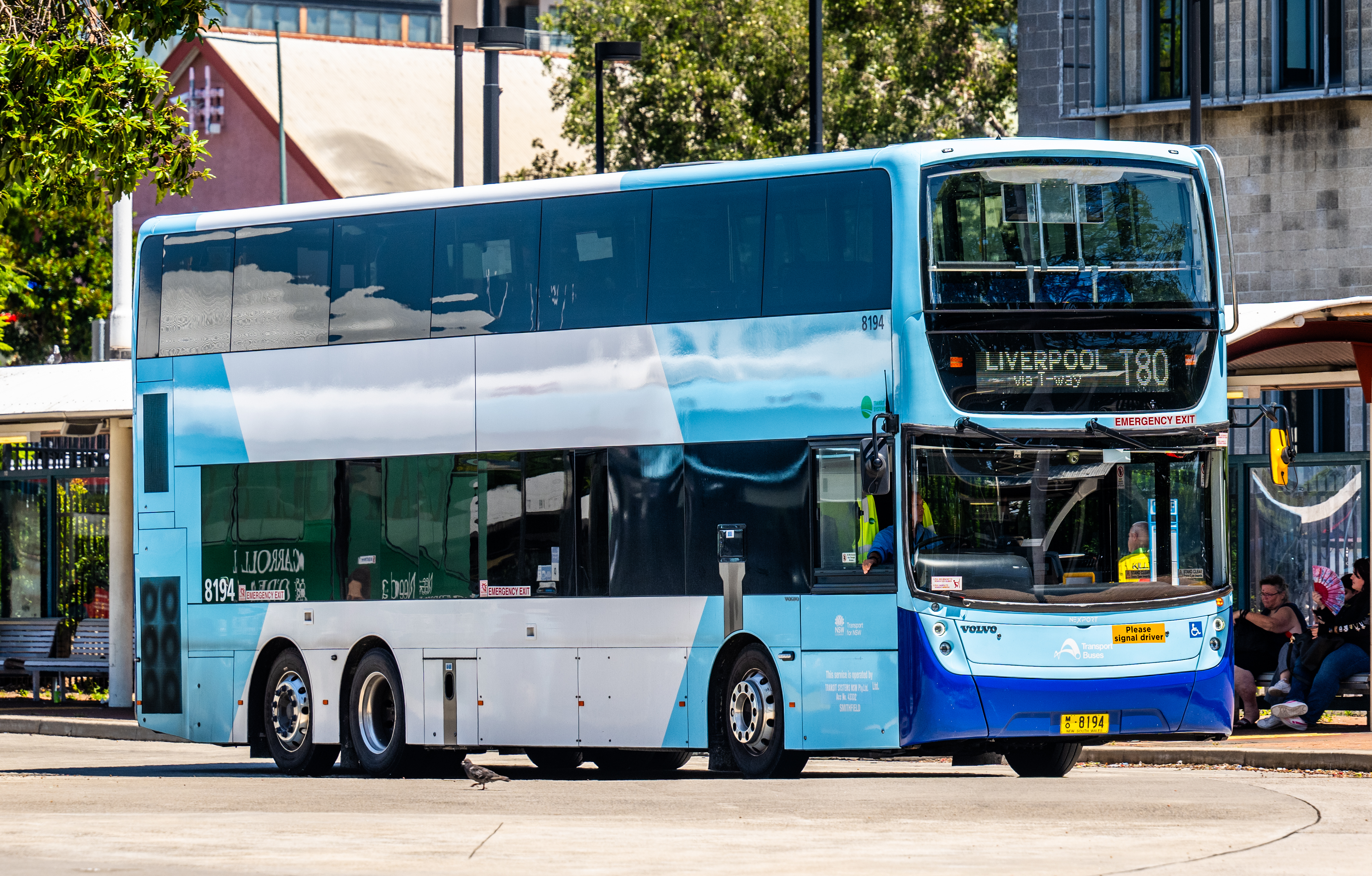
- Gemilang Coachworks bodied Volvo B8L
- Parent: Transit Systems
- Commenced operation: 13 October 2013; 13 years ago
- Headquarters: Smithfield
- Service area: Sydney
- Service type: Bus services
- Depots: Bankstown; Hoxton Park; Smithfield; Burwood; Kingsgrove; Leichhardt; Tempe; South Granville; Bradbury; Macquarie Fields; Smeaton Grange
- Fleet: 1264 (February 2026)
- Chief executive: Graeme Legh
- Website: www.transitsystems.com.au

Transit Systems NSW, formerly known as Transit Systems Sydney, is a bus operator in Sydney, New South Wales, Australia. It is a subsidiary of Transit Systems.

== History ==
In November 2012, Transit Systems was awarded a contract by Transport for NSW to operate region 3 bus services in Western Sydney, taking over services operated by Busabout, Hopkinsons, Metro-link and Westbus. Transit Systems also took over route T80 on the Liverpool–Parramatta T-way from Western Sydney Buses. Operations commenced on 13 October 2013.

On 1 July 2018, Transit Systems took over the operation of region 6 from State Transit on an eight-year contract operating services in the Canterbury-Bankstown, Eastern Suburbs, Inner West, North Shore and St George regions.

In December 2022, after a tendering process, Transit Systems successfully retained region 3 and was additionally awarded the services in region 13, which would be consolidated into region 3. The new contract for the combined region began on 6 August 2023, with region 13 services taken over from Transdev NSW. The seven-year contract will expire on 30 November 2030. In addition to region 3, in February 2023, Transit Systems was awarded the contract for region 2, which includes region 15 consolidated into region 2. The new contract for the combined region 2 began on 8 October 2023, with services taken over from Interline Bus Services and Busabout. The region 2 contract will expire on 28 June 2031.

== Depots ==
Transit Systems operates out of three depots in Region 2 in Bradbury, Macquarie Fields and Smeaton Grange, four depots in Region 3 in Bankstown, Hoxton Park, Smithfield and South Granville, and four in Region 6 in Burwood, Kingsgrove, Leichhardt and Tempe.

== Fleet ==
As of February 2026, Transit Systems NSW operates a fleet of 1264 buses with 151 of them being electric. Many of these buses were inherited from other operators such as Westbus, Metro-link Bus Lines, Hopkinsons, Interline, Busabout, Transdev and State Transit when Transit Systems took over their operations.
