= Burwood Bus Depot =

Sydney terminus

- Interactive map of Burwood Bus Depot

Location
- Location: Parramatta Road, Burwood
- Coordinates: 33°52′11″S 151°06′35″E

Characteristics
- Owner: Transport for NSW
- Operator: Transit Systems
- Depot code: B

History
- Opened: 1933

Burwood Bus Depot is a bus depot in the Sydney suburb of Burwood operated by Transit Systems.

== History ==
Burwood Bus Depot was purchased by the Department of Road Transport & Tramways from the Metropolitan Omnibus Transport Company in 1933. As part of the contracting out of region 6, operation of Burwood depot passed from State Transit to Transit Systems on 1 July 2018.

As of November 2026, it has an allocation of 113 buses.
