= Transport Construction Authority =

Government agency in New South Wales

- Logo of the authority's former name Transport Infrastructure Development Corporation

Statutory authority overview
- Formed: 2004
- Dissolved: 1 November 2011
- Superseding Statutory authority: Transport for NSW
- Type: Corporation
- Jurisdiction: New South Wales

The Transport Construction Authority (TCA), formerly the Transport Infrastructure Development Corporation (TIDC) prior to July 2010, was an agency of the Government of New South Wales that was responsible for new railway projects in the city of Sydney, Australia. On 1 November 2011 the Transport Construction Authority was subsumed into the newly formed Transport for NSW.

== History ==
The Transport Infrastructure Development Corporation (TIDC) was formed as part of the Transport portfolio and was charged with delivering a number of major public transport, in particular commuter rail, construction projects across the greater Sydney metropolitan area. The authority oversaw the process of planning, design, regulatory approval and community relations for its projects. Construction was performed by private-sector construction companies. When built, the infrastructure was turned over for management by CityRail.

The former chairman of TIDC was Ron Finlay, who served the role for 5 years. In 2006-2007 the TIDC was responsible for 11 projects under construction, collectively worth over A$3.2 billion, with another nine projects in the planning phase. Project expenditure for the year totaled A$629 million.

The TIDC was renamed the Transport Construction Authority on 1 July 2010. On 1 November 2011, the Transport Construction Authority was abolished and subsumed into Transport for NSW.

== Projects ==
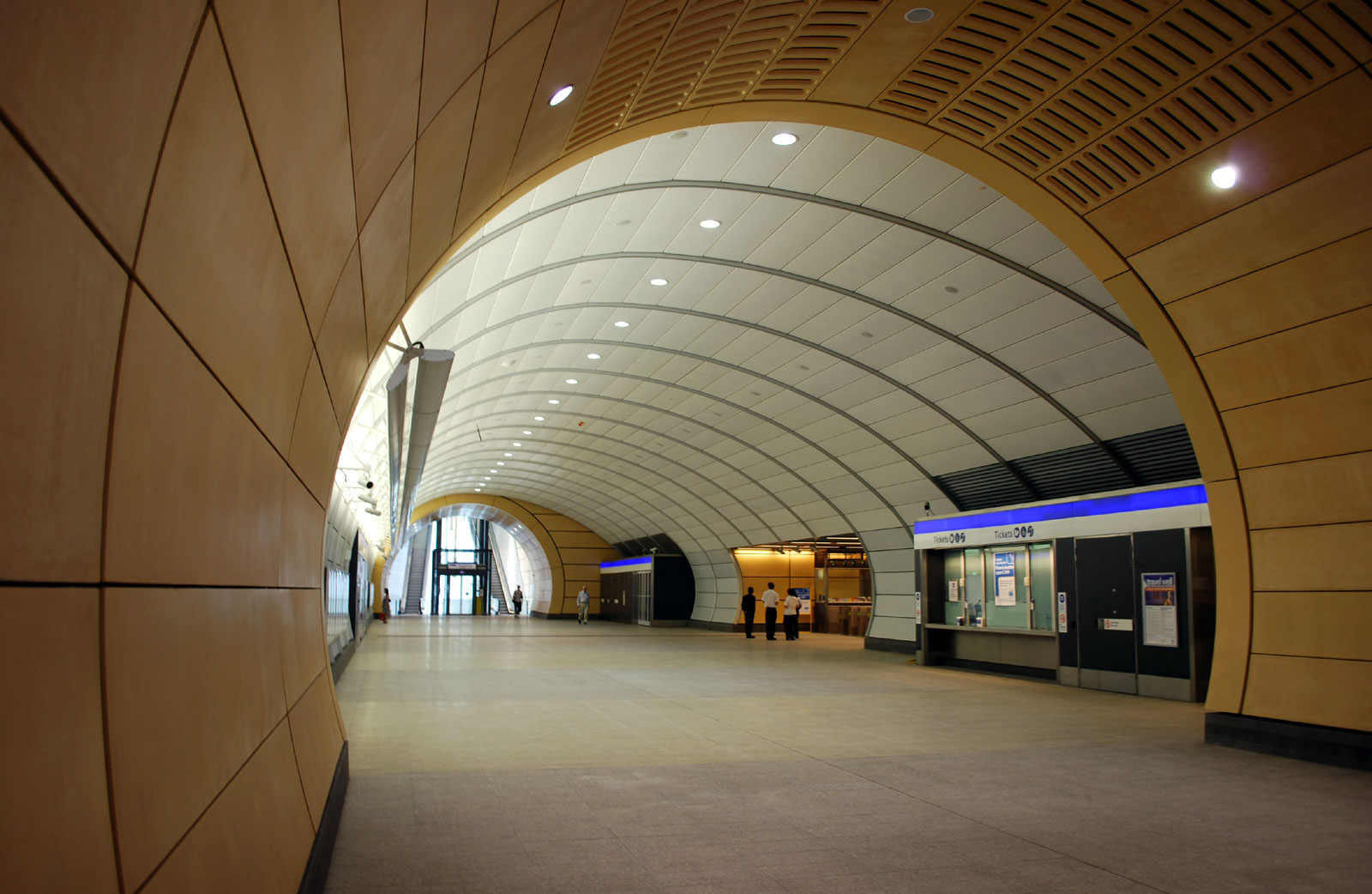
Ticket hall of Macquarie Park station, on the Epping to Chatswood railway line

=== Transferred to Transport for New South Wales ===
- Rail Clearways Program
  - Macarthur turnback
  - Liverpool turnback
  - Kingsgrove to Revesby quadruplication
  - Schofields to Vineyard duplication
- South West Rail Link
- Northern Sydney Freight Corridor Program
- Auburn stabling
- Commuter Car Park and Interchange Program (remaining projects)

=== Completed ===
- Rail Clearways Program
  - Bondi Junction turnback
  - Berowra third platform
  - Macdonaldtown stabling
  - Revesby turnback
  - Hornsby fifth platform
  - Lidcombe turnback
  - Sutherland to Cronulla duplication
  - Homebush turnback
  - Quakers Hill to Schofields duplication
- Parramatta Transport Interchange
- Epping to Chatswood railway line
- Chatswood Transport Interchange
- North Sydney station upgrade
- Commuter Car Park and Interchange Program (some projects)

== See also ==
- Sydney Metro Authority
