= Opal card =

Contactless fare collection system used in New South Wales, Australia

- Location: New South Wales, Australia:
- Launched: 7 December 2012
- Successor: Opal 2.0
- Technology: Contactless smart card by Cubic MiFare DESFire EV1
- Operator: Transport for NSW
- Manager: Cubic
- Currency: AUD ($250 maximum load)
- Stored-value: Pay as you go
- Credit expiry: 14 years
- Auto recharge: Available for registered cards
- Retailed: Online; Telephone; Retailers
- Variants: Adult; Child/Youth; Senior/Pensioner; Concession; School student; Employee
- Website: transportnsw.info/tickets-opal/opal

Opal is a contactless smartcard fare collection system for public transport services in New South Wales, Australia. Operation of the Opal system is managed by Transport for NSW. First launched in late 2012, Opal is valid on Transport for NSW's metro, train, bus, ferry and light rail services that operate in Sydney, Central Coast, Hunter Region, Blue Mountains, Illawarra and Southern Highlands areas. Opal equipment was designed from the start to support a variety of cards, but launched with the captive Opal cards.

Opal cards are the standard method of paying for fares on the Opal system. The card is a credit card-sized smartcard which includes a microchip and internal RFID aerial, allowing the card to communicate with readers. The microchip enables value to be loaded onto the card, as well as allowing the journey details to be recorded and the appropriate fare deducted from the stored value on the card. Passengers 'tap on' and 'tap off' any services whenever they travel through the public transport network. Opal cards can also be used to pay for fares on selected third party transport services via a facility known as OpalPay.

After a gradual rollout from 2017, the Opal system has accepted contactless payment via credit card, debit card and linked devices with the same fares and benefits as an adult Opal card since 2019.

== History ==
=== Integration ===
Sydney has used a number of automated ticketing systems since the opening of the Eastern Suburbs railway line in June 1979. The Sydney Automated Fare Collection System (AFC) was rolled out across all government-run CityRail (train) and State Transit Authority (bus and ferry) services in Greater Sydney between 1988 and 1993. The system featured loose integration between the different modes of transport, a complex fare structure and excluded private operators. By being limited to the services provided by the government agencies, most bus services in the outer western, northern and southern parts of Sydney, including all bus services of the Blue Mountains, Central Coast, and Illawarra regions were excluded from the system.

A unified brand for the majority of public transport tickets was introduced in April 2010. MyZone was designed to simplify the fare system and remove one of the stumbling blocks to the introduction of a smart card. The AFC system was retained where it was in use, but tickets could also be used on private buses – and subsequently on light rail – by presenting a ticket to the bus driver or tram conductor.

=== Tcard ===
A replacement for the AFC based on smart card technology, named Tcard was first announced by the government in 1996, with the aim of having a system in place before the 2000 Sydney Olympics. The contract was awarded to ERG Group, but was delayed until 2002 due to a lawsuit from the losing bidder Cubic, which was labelled dishonest by the presiding Supreme Court of New South Wales judge.

In 2001, Cubic launched a court action against the government but the case exposed an improper relationship between its managing director and a RailCorp employee alleged to have leaked tender secrets to Cubic.

Ruling against Cubic in 2002, the NSW Supreme Court judge Michael Adams found it was ''guilty of reprehensible conduct'' and had shown a ''lack of good faith and positive dishonesty'' in the tender process.

The development and rollout of the system was beset with difficulties, leading the government to terminate the contract in November 2007. The government sued ERG for $77 million who counter sued for $215m. The claim was settled in February 2012.

=== Opal ===
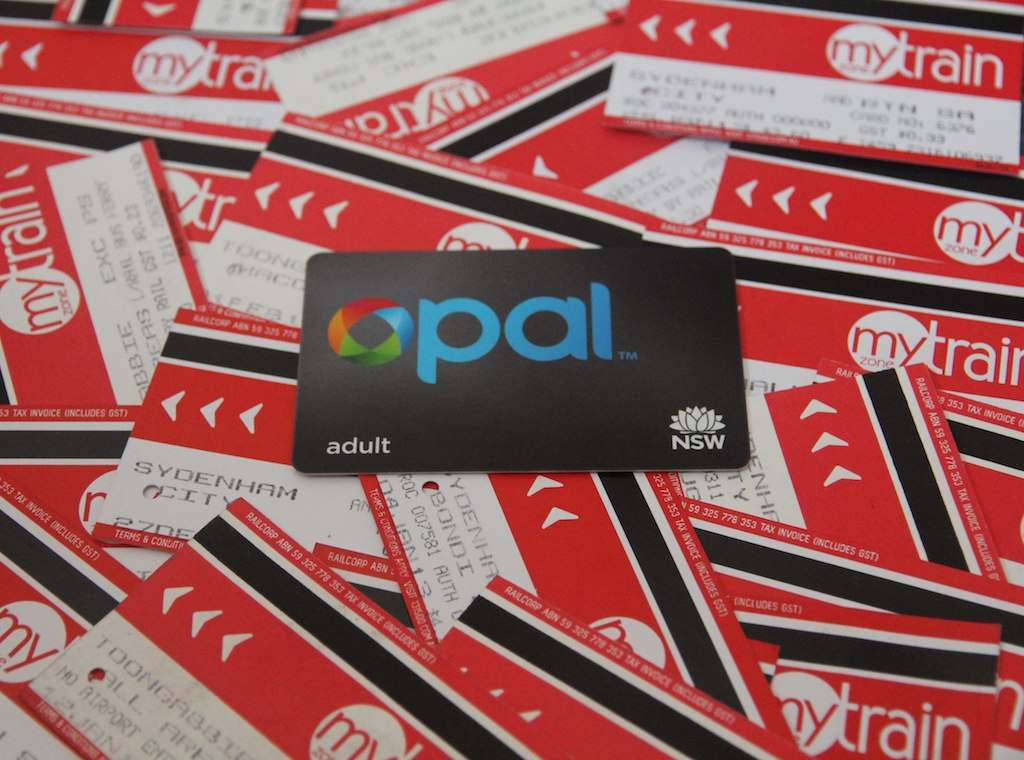
Opal card with MyZone train tickets which it replaced

After terminating the Tcard contract, the government quickly moved to reset the smartcard project. It called for expressions of interest for the second attempt at the project in August 2008. In April 2010 the government awarded the contract to the Pearl Consortium, whose members are the Commonwealth Bank, Cubic and Downer EDI. The initial contract ran until September 2024. It was later extended until September 2026.

In September 2011, the new name for the system was announced as 'Opal', chosen from a selection of 665 names. Transport for NSW said Opal was chosen because it was uniquely Australian, short, and easy to say. As well as the opal being Australia's national gemstone, the black opal is the New South Wales gemstone symbol.

In June 2022, the New South Wales government committed funding to the Opal Next Gen project. In 2024, the New South Wales government renewed its contract with Cubic to operate the original Opal card system after it had been in place for 14 years and was due to lapse in September. Transport for NSW extended the contract until September 2026.

=== Rollout ===
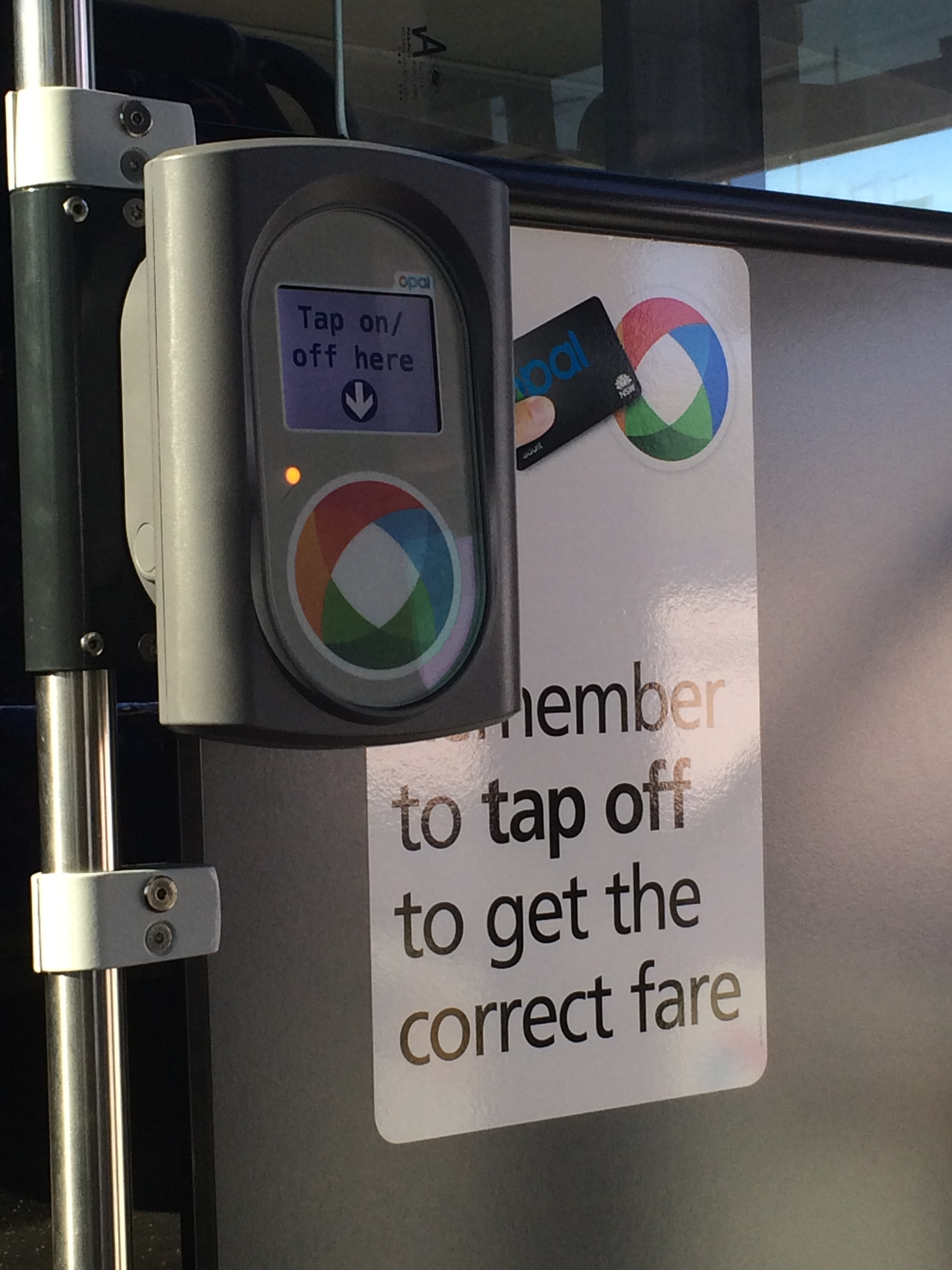
Opal reader installed on a bus

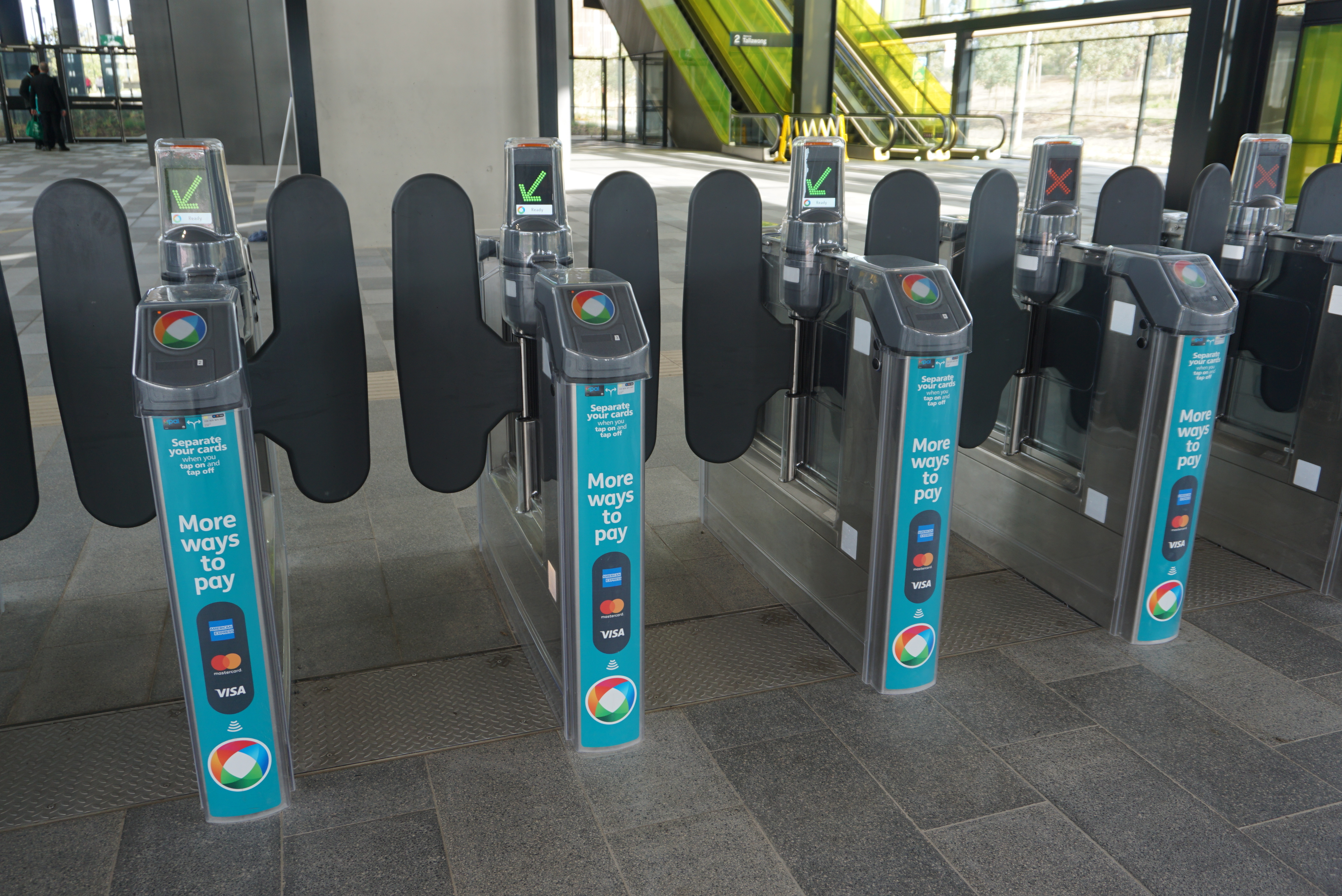
Ticket gates at Kellyville station

The initial Opal rollout commenced on the Neutral Bay to Circular Quay ferry service in late 2012 and was completed two years later when the Inner West Light Rail was added to the network. During this period, Opal was progressively rolled out to all ferry services operating under a New South Wales Government service contract, Sydney suburban and intercity train services, all bus services operating under a Metropolitan or Outer Metropolitan service contract and on Sydney's light rail line.

Mode	Rollout commenced	Rollout completed
Ferry	7 December 2012	30 August 2013 (Sydney)
Ferry	20 November 2014 (Newcastle)	
Train	14 June 2013	11 April 2014
Bus	30 September 2013	20 November 2014
Light rail	1 December 2014	

Single trip ticket machines were rolled-out during 2016. Opal replaced all pre-existing paper tickets, with these tickets being withdrawn in stages, with the process completed on 1 August 2016:

- 14 tickets (mostly periodicals) were withdrawn on 1 September 2014.
- 11 Newcastle-specific tickets were withdrawn on 20 November 2014.
- On 1 January 2016, all other paper tickets were withdrawn except single and return tickets for trains, ferries and light rail and single bus tickets.
- The last remaining tickets were withdrawn on 1 August 2016. Single trip Opal tickets serve as their replacement.

== Payment types ==
A standard adult Opal card

=== Opal ===
Reusable Opal cards come in five different types, each with their own colour. These are: Adult (black), Child/Youth (green), Senior/Pensioner (gold), Concession (silver), Employee (blue) and School (light blue). Reusable Opal cards can be ordered online or over the phone. Adult and Child/Youth cards are also available from retail outlets, such as convenience stores, newsagents, supermarkets and at Service NSW centres.

The Adult fare card was the first card to be released, becoming available in December 2012. On 6 April 2014, the Child/Youth card was made available. These cards had to be ordered either online or over the phone. From 28 July until the end of September 2014, temporary kiosks were set up at major railway stations and shopping centres, as unregistered Adult and Child/Youth cards were made available for the first time. Opal retailers have distributed unregistered Adult and Child/Youth cards since 10 August 2014.

The Senior/Pensioner card was made available for ordering online or by phone on 3 November 2014. Between 11 November and 5 December 2014, temporary kiosks were set up at shopping centres to allow seniors and pensioners to order their Opal cards. The Concession card is available to eligible apprentices, trainees, tertiary students and job seekers. Concession cards became available to tertiary students on 2 February 2015. To be eligible for the Concession Opal, students must be enrolled full-time at a participating institution. Students need to give consent for their institution to share enrolment details with Transport for NSW. As of 14 June 2015 the cards were available for students at over 80 institutions. The Concession Opal became available to eligible NSW job seekers from 29 June 2015.

When originally launched, adult cards were scheduled to expire after nine years. This has since been extended to 14 years.

=== Free travel cards ===
There are a number of cards that do not have any stored value for individuals with free travel entitlements. These cards are plastic MIFARE Ultralight C cards.

The School card is provided to students with entitlements to free transport to/from school under the School Student Transport Scheme. Owing to the light rail's heritage as a privately run enterprise, free travel for school students was traditionally not available on this mode. The School Opal was introduced on light rail from July 2016.

A grey Opal card is available for holders of a free travel Vision Impaired Person's Travel Pass. The card can be used to open ticket gates at stations and ferry wharves without requiring staff assistance.

Employee cards are used by certain public service employees (e.g. Police, Sydney Trains staff) entitled to free travel on some or all public transport services. Prior to June 2021, employee cards were grey.

=== Single trip tickets ===
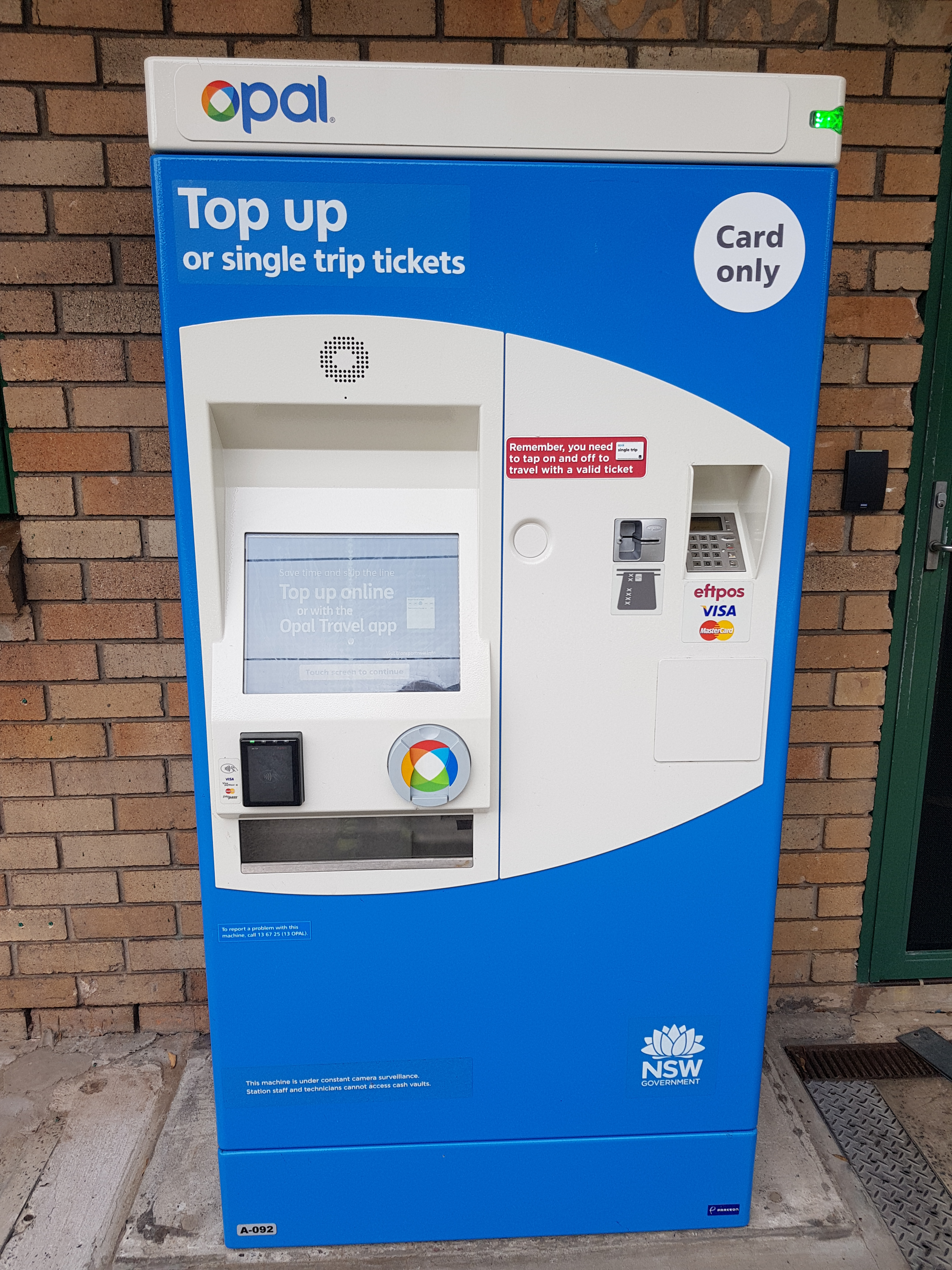
An Opal top up machine for purchasing single trip tickets and topping up Opal cards.

Non-reusable (single trip) Opal tickets were introduced on 1 August 2016, replacing all remaining paper tickets. These are only valid on the day of purchase for a single trip only, and only two ticket types are available: Adult and Child/Youth. Single ticket prices are significantly higher than the applicable fare on a reloadable card to discourage their use.

Single trip tickets can be bought from top up machines at most train stations, ferry wharves and light rail stops. Tickets issued from these machines are cardboard MIFARE Ultralight C cards.

In the past, single trip tickets were also available on buses. These were simply thermal paper receipts and did not need to be validated. As with prior to Opal, these tickets were not available on PrePay routes or stops. Starting in 2018, PrePay routes became known as 'Opal only' routes and many more routes became designated as 'Opal only', with no tickets sold on board. All remaining routes became Opal only on 25 March 2020 due to COVID-19 concerns.

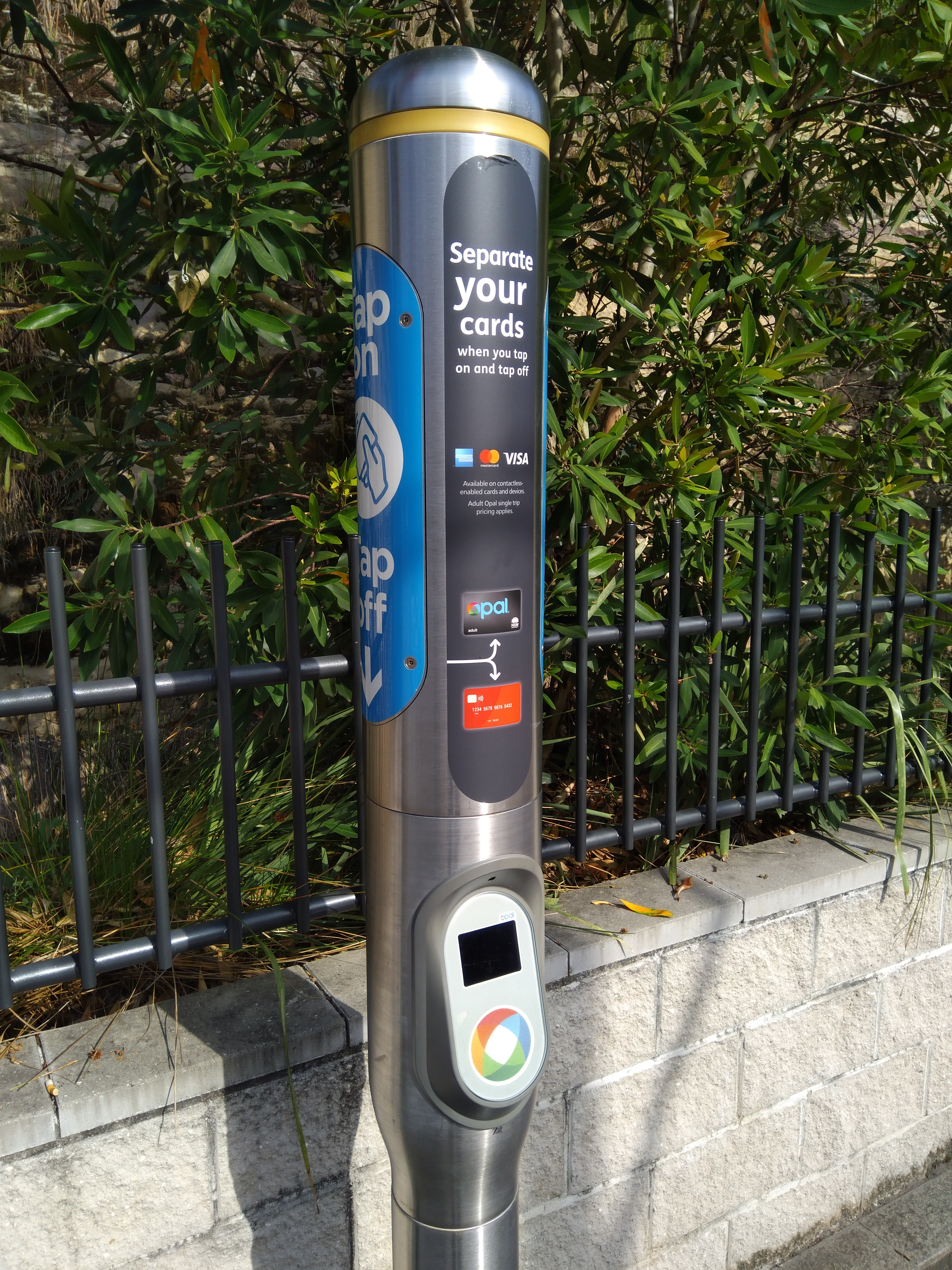
A standalone Opal reader

=== Contactless payments ===
A trial supporting direct contactless payments from debit and credit cards was introduced on 6 July 2017. This allows passengers to tap on or off using their card or a mobile device linked to their card's account, thereby removing the need to use an Opal card or ticket. The trial began on the F1 Manly ferry service, initially only for holders of Mastercard contactless cards. All passengers were charged the price of an adult Opal single trip ticket. On 12 March 2018, the trial was expanded to include all Sydney Ferries and Sydney light rail services, and support for Visa and American Express cards was also added. On 26 November 2018, it was further expanded to cover all Sydney Trains and NSW TrainLink intercity services. The contactless fare structure was also changed to charge normal Opal peak hour fares, and support for the daily, weekly and Sunday caps was introduced. However contactless payments could not be used to benefit from or pay for Weekly Travel Rewards, Transfer Discounts, Off-peak train fare discounts, Trip Advantage and free access to Opal park & ride carparks. On 29 July 2019, all Opal benefits except park & ride and on demand services, were extended to contactless payments. The rollout of contactless payment to Opal controlled buses commenced on 2 August 2019 and was complete by the end of September 2019. For detailed rollout information see Contactless rollout on buses.

The technology is based on a system developed by Cubic Transport Systems on licence from Transport for London.

On 12 April 2026, it was announced that a system digital upgrade effective 16 April would enable passengers to link a concession to contactless payment methods.

=== Opal digital ===
On 8 December 2020, registrations opened to trial an Opal digital card where the Opal card was loaded onto mobile devices such as phones and watches, which could then be used to tap on/tap off, instead of using a physical card. This was available for Adult Opal fares only, initially on Apple and Samsung devices with Android 8.0 or later, with Google devices added at a later date. The trial which ran for 12 months, was limited to 10,000 users. It could not be used on OpalPay services or park & ride. The trial ended, with all trial cards disabled and refunded, on 12 December 2021.

== Fares ==
=== Fare types ===
Opal integrates ticketing on all modes of public transport; however, it does not fully integrate fares. The fare types for reusable cards and contactless payments are metro/train, bus/light rail and ferry. All modes except ferries offer separate peak period and off-peak fares. All fares are calculated based on the distance travelled (for metro and train,that distance is track distance between the stations, and for all other modes, it is straight line distance between start and end) and are for single trips only. Opal's non-reusable single trip tickets use the same mode groupings as the standard fares but offer no off-peak fares and are more expensive than the equivalent standard fare.

The following tables list Opal fares:

Metro and train
As of 14 July 2025	0–10 km	10–20 km	20–35 km	35–65 km	65 km+
Adult cards & contactless (peak)	$4.33	$5.38	$6.20	$8.28	$10.66
Adult cards & contactless (off-peak)	$3.03	$3.76	$4.34	$5.79	$7.46
Other cards (peak)	$2.16	$2.69^	$3.10^	$4.14^	$5.33^
Other cards (off-peak)	$1.51	$1.88	$2.17	$2.89^	$3.73^
Adult single trip	$5.20	$6.50	$7.40	$9.90	$12.80
Child/Youth single trip	$2.60	$3.20	$3.70	$4.80	$6.40

Bus or light rail
As of 14 July 2025	0–3 km	3–8 km	>8 km
Adult cards & contactless (peak)	$3.30	$4.49	$5.77
Adult cards & contactless (off-peak)	$2.31	$3.14	$4.03
Other cards (peak)	$1.65	$2.24	$2.88^
Other cards (off-peak)	$1.15	$1.56	$2.01
Adult single trip	$4.00	$5.40	$6.90
Child/Youth single trip	$2.00	$2.70	$3.40

Ferry
As of 14 July 2025	0–9 km	9 km+
Adult cards & contactless	$7.35	$9.20
Other cards	$3.67^	$4.60^
Adult single trip	$8.80	$11.00
Child/Youth single trip	$4.40	$5.50
Bus fares apply to Newcastle's Stockton Ferry

^= $2.50 cap applies for Senior/Pensioner cardholders

A surcharge is levied when using the two privately operated stations serving Sydney Airport:

Airport station access fee
As of 14 July 2025	Adult cards	Other cards
Domestic or International Airport to/from all other stations	$17.92	$16.03
Domestic or International Airport to/from Green Square	$12.05	$12.05
Domestic or International Airport to/from Mascot	$9.65	$9.65
Domestic to/from International	$5.00	$5.00

As there are no return or periodical options available, reusable Opal cards and contactless payments include a number of caps to reduce the cost for frequent travellers:

Fare caps
As of 14 July 2025	Adult cards	Other concession cards	Senior/pensioner cards
Daily Monday–Thursday	$19.30	$9.65	$2.50
Daily Friday, Saturday and Sunday	$9.65	$4.80	$2.50
Weekly	$50.00	$25.00	$17.50
Weekly airport station access fee	$36.36	$32.58	$32.58

Other key discounts include:

- A transfer discount of $2 for Adult cards and $1 for other cards when transferring between modes (halved when on half-fare discount), except between metro and train.

Fares have increased on the first Monday in July (although October in 2023) generally matching inflation, but with some adjustment from government directives. The caps for Senior/Pensioner cards, the transfer discount and the Weekly caps (since introduced) have not changed since 2016.

Being a distance-based system, Opal users are required to tap on and tap off all modes of public transport (apart from the F1 Manly Ferry; which has the fare charged on tap on) to ensure the correct fare is charged. If a user only taps at one end of their journey, a default fare will be charged, corresponding to the maximum fare on that mode of travel. However, a lower default fare applies if it is not possible to reach the maximum fare on the route for which the tap on took place. If the user fails to tap off, the default fare is charged after exceeding the maximum journey time (5 hours for most train trips) or when tapping on at a gated station for the next journey.

An off-peak discount applies to encourage travel outside of peak times. This discount originally only applied to train trips only, but from 6 July 2020, it was enabled on bus and light rail as well. The discount is currently set at its original level of 30%. It was temporarily increased to 50% between 6 July and 5 October 2020. Peak times were originally between 07:00 to 09:00 (for Sydney Trains stations), 06:00 to 08:00 (for most intercity stations) and 16:00 to 18:30 (for all stations) on weekdays. Even earlier peak times applied at certain intercity stations located very far from Sydney. Peak times were widened to (6:00 for intercity stations) 6:30 to 10:00 and 15:00 to 19:00 on weekdays on 6 July 2020.

Transport Officers and NSW Police, who randomly patrol services, are equipped with portable card readers and mobile phone based readers.

=== Trips, journeys and transfers ===
Fares are categorised in two ways: a trip is a single unit of travel, from tap on to tap off; a journey is a collection of at least 1 trip taken within a short space of time of each other. Multiple Trips will be counted as one journey if a passenger taps on for a new trip within 1 hour of tapping off from their previous trip (on the F1 Manly ferry the time limit is 130 minutes from tap on). Trips are used to calculate fares. Fares for consecutive trips involving the same mode of transport are combined so the passenger is charged as if they have taken just one trip, from its origin to ultimate destination – this is known as Trip Advantage. Journeys involving transfers between modes generally attract separate fares for each mode. The exception is the Stockton ferry in Newcastle, which is classified as a bus for modial purposes. A journey can consist of a maximum of eight trips.

=== Changes to fare calculation ===
Since 5 September 2016, a discount has applied when changing modes during a journey, other than metro/train which are treated as the same mode.

In 2014, the government stated that when the CBD and South East Light Rail opened in 2019, passengers would pay a single fare for a journey involving the use of both light rail and buses, however this was before the introduction of the transfer discount and ultimately not implemented.

Previously once a journey count of eight was reached during the week (Monday to Sunday), travel was free for the remainder of the week. This discount was changed to half-price travel on 5 September 2016 and removed altogether on 16 October 2023. When an Opal customer completes eight trips on the same mode of transport (even within the 1-hour transfer), a new journey commences. The number of trips required to force the creation of a new journey was increased from four trips to eight trips in March 2016 to reduce the number of short trips made simply to complete a journey and reach the journey limit.

All of Saturday and Sunday were originally nominated as being off-peak. On 16 October 2023, this was extended to include all of Friday, recognising changes to travel patterns due to the COVID-19 pandemic. The discount applied after eight journeys in a week was removed at the same time.

=== Topping up ===
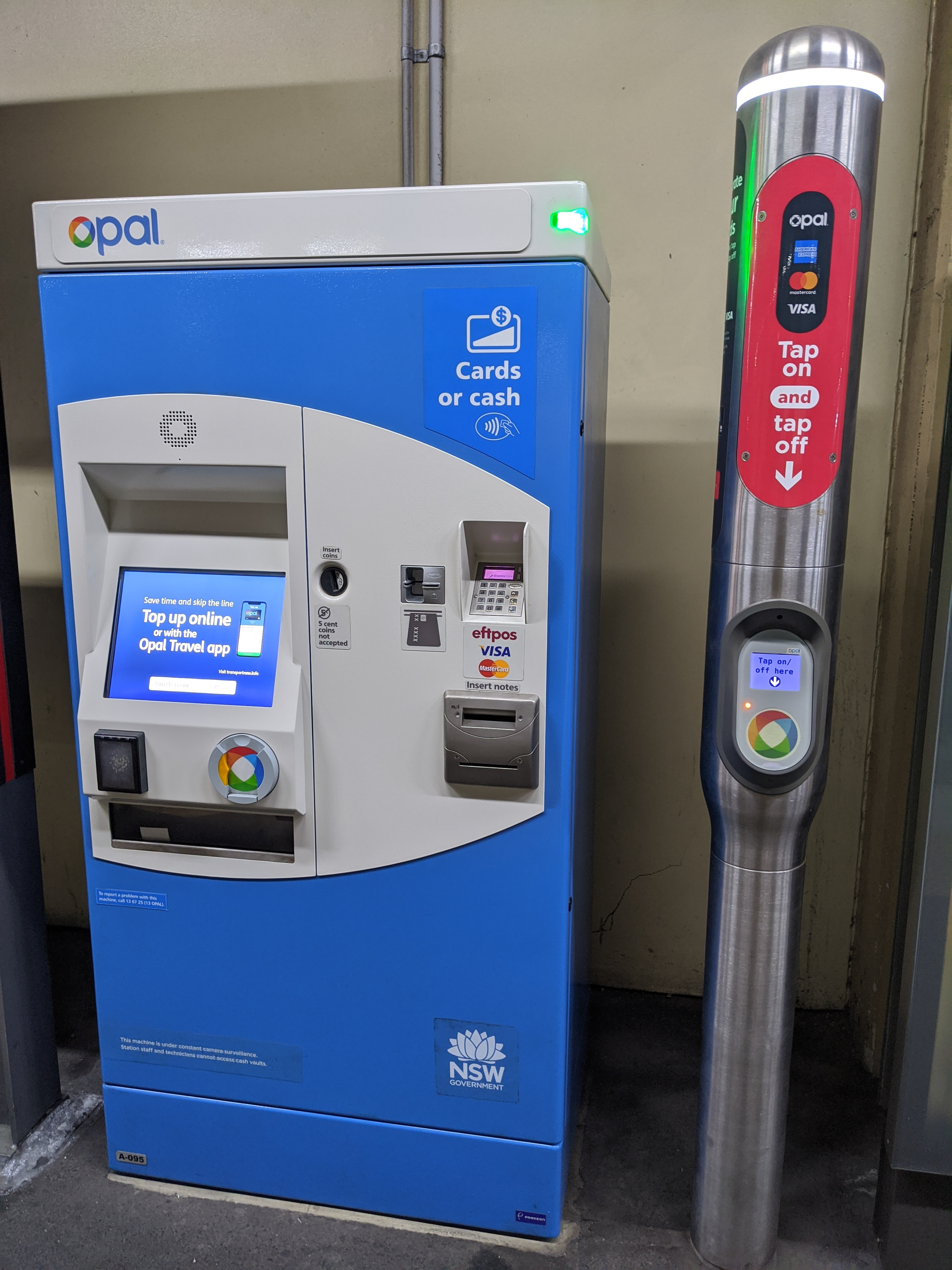
Opal top up machine and Opal reader at a light rail stop

Placing money onto an Opal card is known as topping up. As of January 2016, there are over 2,000 Opal card retailers that provide top up services across New South Wales. There are also top up machines at railway stations, light rail stops, and ferry wharves. Opal cards may also be linked to a credit or debit card, allowing users to top up their balance online or by phone. When linked to a credit or debit card, Opal cards can be configured to automatically top up the balance when it falls below a pre-set amount (auto top up), currently $10.

Top up limits
Card type	Minimum top up amount			Maximum card balance
Card type	Top up location			Maximum card balance
Card type	Retailer	Top up machine	Auto top up/Online/Phone	Maximum card balance
Adult	$20	$20	$10	$250
Senior/Pensioner	$2.50	$5	$5	$250
All others	$10	$10	$5	$150

== Operation ==
=== Network ===
The Opal network comprises:

- the Sydney Metro network.
- the Sydney Trains and Intercity Trains networks
- the bus networks of the cities of Sydney and Newcastle and the Blue Mountains, Central Coast, Illawarra and Hunter regions
- the Sydney Ferries network, the Manly Fast Ferry and the Stockton ferry in Newcastle
- the Sydney Light Rail, Parramatta Light Rail and Newcastle Light Rail networks

Transport for NSW operates the Opal website and a phone hotline for customer service, card top ups, orders and inquiries. It provides an "Opal Travel" app for Android and iOS devices. The app includes a trip planning facility, allows Opal card top ups and provides access to Opal card data. Android devices that include near field communication hardware can scan an Opal card to access live data, including the card's balance, tap status (tapped on/off), weekly travel reward status, top up status and card number.

Beginning in January 2018, an Opal Park & Ride trial scheme was introduced at selected commuter car parks. Passengers are able to park their cars for free for up to 18 hours if they take public transport and use the carpark using the same Opal card. The scheme is intended to reduce the number of spaces used by those who aren't catching public transport.

Transport for NSW also used to sell a number of mobile phone case accessories that incorporate a pocket for the Opal card.

=== OpalPay ===
First introduced in December 2017, OpalPay is a facility allowing Opal cards to be used to pay fares on a number of privately owned services that operate independently from Transport for NSW's contracted services, and on on-demand minibus services. Fares on these services are set by the owner of the service and Opal's regular discounts do not apply. Concession fares are accepted on some services. OpalPay can be accepted on some private ferry services and On Demand bus services.

== Infrastructure ==
=== Opal machines ===
Over 350 top up machines are installed at railway stations, light rail stops and ferry wharves throughout the Opal area. The first generation machines can only provide top ups with a debit or credit card. Second generation machines provide top ups and can also sell single trip tickets. There are two types of second-generation machines – the difference between the types is the ability to accept cash in addition to electronic payment. On 11 March 2015, the first top up machines became available at the recently opened Edmondson Park and Leppington railway stations. This had been extended to nearly 100 stations and wharves by July 2015. In 2016, the second generation machines are being installed with 58 of the credit card only and 118 of the cash and credit card machines installed as at 23 June 2016.

=== Opal readers ===
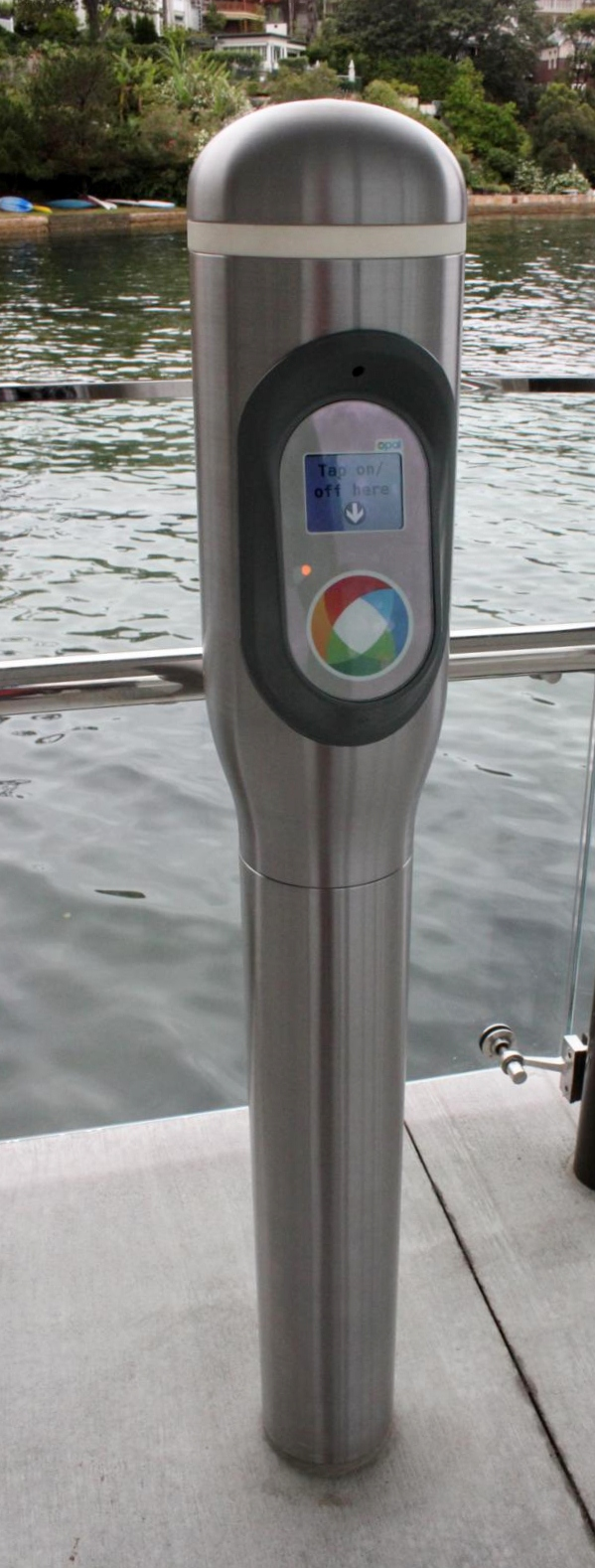
Opal reader on a standalone pole

Opal readers are used to tap on or off. They are installed atop existing ticket barriers, or mounted on a stand-alone pole at railway stations, light rail stops or ferry wharves, or integrated into light or power poles. Buses are the exception, with readers installed on the bus itself. The rollout of Opal technology has seen a new style of gates introduced at a number of major stations. When tapping on or off, all readers display the current balance of the card or an error message if the tap failed to work. Tap offs also display the fare deducted for the trip. A trip that is part of an existing journey will display "transfer" when tapping on. For contactless cards and school cards a green tick is shown.

Non-adult Opal cards have their own distinct 'ding' when tapping on or off, in addition to having a light mounted atop a train station or ferry wharf barrier lit up, allowing for Transport Officers and police to identify and enforce correct fares.

The design of the cigar-shaped Opal poles won the Transport category of the Sydney Design Awards, the Australian International Design Award and the Powerhouse Museum Design Award.

== Reception ==
By June 2016, 7.7 million cards had been issued. The most widely used card types (in descending order) were Adult, Senior/Pensioner, Child/Youth and Concession.

Two billion trips had been taken on the Opal network by May 2018. An average of 13 million trips were taken each week and there were more than 3.7 million Opal cards in active use.

Transport for NSW has stated that customers forget to tap off after about 3% of journeys, so they are charged the default fare.

The Opal electronic ticketing system has won a range of awards reflecting excellence in design for its unique card reader poles used at ungated ferry wharves, light rail stops and railway stations. In addition, the project and its implementation were recognised for excellence by Infrastructure Partnerships Australia. On 12 March 2014, Opal was awarded Australia's 2014 Smart Infrastructure Project of the Year.

== Criticism ==
=== Fare structure ===
The introduction of Opal caused debate over the different fare structures of Opal and the former MyZone paper tickets. Despite being cheaper than single cash fares, Opal single fares were more expensive than the bus and ferry TravelTens, and Opal provides no equivalent to the all-you-can-use MyTrain or MyMulti periodical tickets. An unofficial fare comparison site called Opal or Not claimed that more than half of all the public transport trips it compared were more expensive using Opal than with paper tickets. Transport for NSW disputes the site's findings, calling it "riddled with errors" and stating that only 7% would "potentially" pay more, but refused to release the analysis behind that figure.

In addition, the initial lack of transfer benefits was criticised. Corinne Mulley, the chair of the Institute of Transport and Logistics Studies, described the launch of the card as a "missed opportunity" since, at the time, Opal retained many of the "interchange penalties" of paying for transfers, and Opal was more expensive than MyMulti for some multi-modal commuters. Transport Minister Gladys Berejiklian rejected the criticism, stating that "we believe that customers should pay for the mode they are using".

=== Privacy concerns ===
Significant privacy issues have been raised, as Opal travel information is available to government departments without a warrant. Among those who expressed concerns were New South Wales Privacy Commissioner Elizabeth Coomb, the Combined Pensioners and Superannuants Association of NSW, and the University of Sydney.

During the Opal card customer trial period, all Opal cards were required to be registered with the customer's personal information. This allowed for feedback and issues to be recorded against an individual's account. Registered cards offer the ability to protect the balance and transfer it to a new card, if a card is lost, stolen or damaged. Data is made available to other NSW government departments and law enforcement agencies. Concerns about privacy have been repeatedly raised in the mainstream media, with commentators questioning the extent to which user data can be accessed by authorities. Since July 2014, unregistered adult and child/youth Opal cards have been available. In December 2014, University of Sydney delayed collaboration with the new Opal card system, citing privacy concerns, whereas Macquarie University, University of New South Wales and Australian Catholic University had already agreed to provide the "student data" to the card network.
