= Opal 2.0 =

Transport ticketing upgrade for New South Wales

- Location: New South Wales
- Launched: 2028
- Predecessor: Opal card
- Generation: Second
- Manager: Transport for NSW
- Currency: AUD

Opal 2.0 (formerly known as Opal Next Gen) is an upcoming enhancement of the Opal card ticketing system for public transport in New South Wales, Australia. Transport for NSW has cited a need to replace ageing infrastructure as a reason to proceed with the upgrade to Opal 2.0. As of April 2026, the project is targeting a roll-out date of 2028 and has cost $820 million.

Opal 2.0 will have improved integration with digital services such as bank cards and smart phones. Smart phones do not currently allow you to use concession fares via your Opal card but Opal 2.0 will aim to rectify that problem.

As part of the upgrade, Transport for NSW will need to upgrade all 25,000 Opal readers at train and metro stations, light rail stops, ferry wharves and on buses.

== History ==
A public trial of a previous digital Opal card system was in place from June 2022 to 7 June 2023, the program was known as Opal+. Opal+ allowed commuters to pay a certain amount of money for a set number of services for a specified time period. A similar approach was taken in 2019 and a standalone digital card was trialed in 2020, the digital Opal card was trialed for one year.

Funding for the Opal 2.0 upgrade was first announced by the New South Wales government in June 2022 as a response to ageing infrastructure. $567.9 million was invested in the project in the 2022–23 state government budget.

In 2024, the New South Wales government renewed its contract with Cubic to operate the original Opal card system after it had been in place for 14 years and was due to lapse in September. Transport for NSW extended the contract until September 2026.

In January 2025, The Sydney Morning Herald reported that the project was internally targeting a release date of September 2027, further than the original plan of mid-2026.

In December 2024, tenders for the Opal 2.0 system closed.

In August 2025, The Sydney Morning Herald reported that the project was budgeted to cost $738 million up from $568 million.

On 16 April 2026, concession and pensioner Opal cards were enabled for use with credit, debit cards, mobile phones or other capable digital devices, previously only adult fares were accepted using these devices.

On 28 April 2026, the government announced that INIT Pty Ltd will deliver account based ticketing and Trapeze Group will design the bus transport technology.

== Features ==
Opal 2.0 will have improved integration with smart phones and will allow commuters to use bank cards to access concession fares.

Opal 2.0 will allow concertgoers to present a QR code to pass ticket gates.

On 28 April 2026, the government announced that Opal 2.0 will include features such as an improved Opal Travel app, more accurate and faster patronage data for transport modes, automatic fare adjustment if the wrong amount is charged and new information screens on 5,000 buses. The current weekly fare cap structure will be retained. The upgrade to Opal 2.0 aims to put a halt to phantom buses (when a bus appears on a map but does not arrive) with more up to date information.
