= Transport for NSW =

Statutory authority of the New South Wales Government

Agency overview
- Formed: 1 November 2011
- Preceding agencies: Transport Construction Authority; Country Rail Infrastructure Authority; Roads and Maritime Services
- Type: Statutory authority
- Jurisdiction: New South Wales
- Headquarters: 231 Elizabeth Street, Sydney
- Employees: 28,790 (2024–2025)
- Annual budget: $23.11 billion (2024–2025)
- Ministers responsible: John Graham MLC, Minister for Transport; Jenny Aitchison MP, Minister for Roads and Minister for Regional Transport
- Agency executives: Josh Murray, Secretary; Howard Collins, Coordinator-General
- Parent Agency: New South Wales Department of Transport
- Key document: Transport Administration Act 1988 (NSW)
- Website: www.transport.nsw.gov.au

The TfNSW public transport roundels. Left to right: metro, train, bus, ferry, light rail, coach

Transport for NSW (TfNSW) is a New South Wales Government transport services and roads agency established on 1 November 2011. The agency is a different entity to the NSW Department of Transport, which is a department of the state government of New South Wales, and the ultimate parent entity of Transport for NSW.

The agency's function is to build transport infrastructure and manage transport services in New South Wales. Since absorbing Roads and Maritime Services (RMS) in December 2019, the agency is also responsible for building and maintaining road infrastructure, managing the day-to-day compliance and safety for roads and waterways and vehicle and driving licence registrations.

The agency reports to the New South Wales Minister for Transport, Minister for Roads and the Minister for Regional Transport. The ministers are accountable to the Parliament of New South Wales.

== History ==
=== Predecessor transport departments ===
==== Ministry of Transport (1932–1990) ====
In March 1932, the first Department of Transport in New South Wales was formed by the Lang Government. Following the dismissal of the Lang government and the appointment of the Stevens Government in May, in December 1932, the department was replaced by the Ministry of Transport, which was divided into three departments:

- Department of Railways (until October 1972)
- Department of Main Roads (until January 1989) – spun out from Ministry of Transport in March 1956
- Department of Road Transport and Tramways (until June 1952)

In June 1952, the Department of Road Transport and Tramways was further split into:

- Department of Transport and Highways, soon renamed the Department of Motor Transport (June 1952 – January 1989)
- Department of Government Tram and Omnibus Services, soon renamed Department of Government Transport (June 1952 – October 1972)

In October 1972, the Department of Government Transport and Department of Railways were abolished and were replaced by the Public Transport Commission, which continued to be part of the Ministry of Transport. The Ministry of Transport was later briefly known as Ministry of Transport and Highway between January 1975 and October 1978. In January 1989, the Department of Main Roads, Department of Motor Transport, and Traffic Authority of New South Wales merged to form Roads & Traffic Authority (RTA).

==== Subsequent departments (1990–2011) ====
In January 1990, the Ministry of Transport was abolished and replaced by a new Department of Transport and its successors:

- Department of Transport (January 1990 – April 2003) – briefly branded as Transport NSW between 2001 and April 2003
- Transport Co-Ordination Authority (April 2003 – July 2003) – interim
- Ministry of Transport (July 2003 – July 2009)
- Department of Transport and Infrastructure (July 2009 – July 2010) – branded as NSW Transport and Infrastructure (NSWTI)
- Transport NSW (July 2010 – April 2011)

=== Creation of Transport for NSW ===
After winning the 2011 state election, the new Liberal–Nationals government under Barry O'Farrell renamed the transport department from Transport NSW back to Department of Transport. Later that year, in November 2011, the Transport for NSW was formed as a government agency and subsumed the Transport Construction Authority and the Country Rail Infrastructure Authority, and took over the planning and coordination functions of RailCorp, the State Transit Authority and Roads and Maritime Services from the Department of Transport. It also absorbed the functions, assets and liabilities of Sydney Metro Authority, Public Transport Ticketing Corporation as well as some functions from the NSW Department of Planning & Infrastructure. Howard Collins, the former head of Sydney Trains appointed in 2013, is credited with remodelling the transport system after Transport for London.

The entities that were under Transport for NSW upon its creation, as underlined in the Transport Legislation Amendment Act 2011, were:

- Roads and Maritime Services
- Sydney Ferries
- State Transit Authority
- RailCorp

As of March 2023, the Department of Transport continues to exist as a government department and the ultimate parent entity of Transport for NSW and its entities.

=== Sydney Ferries ===
Transport for NSW contracted the Sydney ferry services to Harbour City Ferries in 2011, who started operations in 2012 and then Transdev Sydney Ferries in 2019. Transport for NSW continues to own the ferry fleet and the Balmain shipyard through its entity "Sydney Ferries". This entity is not to be confused with the branding of ferries in Sydney, which also uses the brand "Sydney Ferries".

=== Purchase of Sydney Light Rail and Sydney Monorail ===
Transport for NSW established the "MTS Holding Company" on 12 March 2012, and through the holding company, purchased Metro Transport Sydney, the owner of the Sydney Light Rail and the Sydney Monorail, on 23 March 2012 for $19.8 million. The company, light rail and the monorail also became under control of Transport for NSW and the government. The Sydney Monorail was closed down on 1 July 2013, and on the same day, the Metro Light Rail brand was phased out as part of a broader rebranding and reorganisation of public transport services in New South Wales. The light rail also became under direct ownership of Transport for NSW. The process of shutting down Metro Transport Sydney and transferring assets to Transport for NSW was completed in September 2014 with the deregistration of MTS Holding Company.

=== New railway agencies ===
The operations and maintenance functions of RailCorp were passed on to two newly formed government agencies, Sydney Trains and NSW Trains in July 2013, initially as subsidiaries of RailCorp. However, Sydney Trains and NSW Trains are not controlled entities of RailCorp, but are instead controlled by Transport for NSW. The suburban services of CityRail (also a part of RailCorp) were transferred to Sydney Trains, while CountryLink (also a part of RailCorp) and the intercity services of CityRail were passed on to NSW Trains, trading as NSW TrainLink. As a result, CityRail and CountryLink were abolished.

In July 2017, Sydney Trains and NSW Trains became independent and standalone agencies under Transport for NSW, and ceased to be subsidiaries of RailCorp. At the same time, the Residual Transport Corporation (RTC) was formed. RailCorp continued to exist as the railway asset owner until 1 July 2020, when it was converted into a state-owned corporation and renamed Transport Asset Holding Entity (TAHE). The RTC will then own assets that are not suitable for TAHE ownership.

In July 2018, the Sydney Metro Delivery Office, which was formed in 2011, was converted into a standalone Sydney Metro operating agency under Transport for NSW, similar to Sydney Trains and NSW Trains.

=== Amalgamation of Transport and Road agencies ===
After the 2019 state election, the government announced they would be merging Roads and Maritime Services (RMS) into Transport for NSW, to integrate roads and transport into a single agency. Legislation to dissolve RMS and transfer its functions to Transport for NSW was passed in the NSW Parliament and granted royal assent in November 2019. RMS was dissolved and merged into Transport for NSW on 1 December 2019.

=== Parklands ===
On 1 April 2022, the Greater Sydney Parklands Trust was transferred from the Department of Planning and Environment (DPE) to Transport for NSW. The trust comprised Centennial Parklands (including Moore Park and Queens Park), Western Sydney Parklands, Parramatta Park, Callan Park and Fernhill Estate, and their individual park trusts. The Luna Park Reserve Trust, Place Management NSW and the Royal Botanic Gardens and Domain Trust and Smart Places Strategy were also transferred from DPE to Transport for NSW.

== Purpose ==
The authority develops regulations, policies and legislation to ensure that transport is safe, reliable and resilient, sustainable, reduces disadvantage, accommodates the demands of a growing population, protects assets and public money and enables housing, energy transmission and Closing the Gap. The authority manages an annual multibillion-dollar transport budget and in partnership with the transport operating agencies manages more than $106 billion in property, plant and equipment assets. Funding is provided for rail, bus, ferry, light rail, roads and community transport services and related infrastructure. The authority also funds concession schemes such as the School Student Transport Scheme, the Private Vehicle Conveyance Scheme, the School Drive Subsidy and the Taxi Transport Subsidy Scheme.

== Organisational structure ==
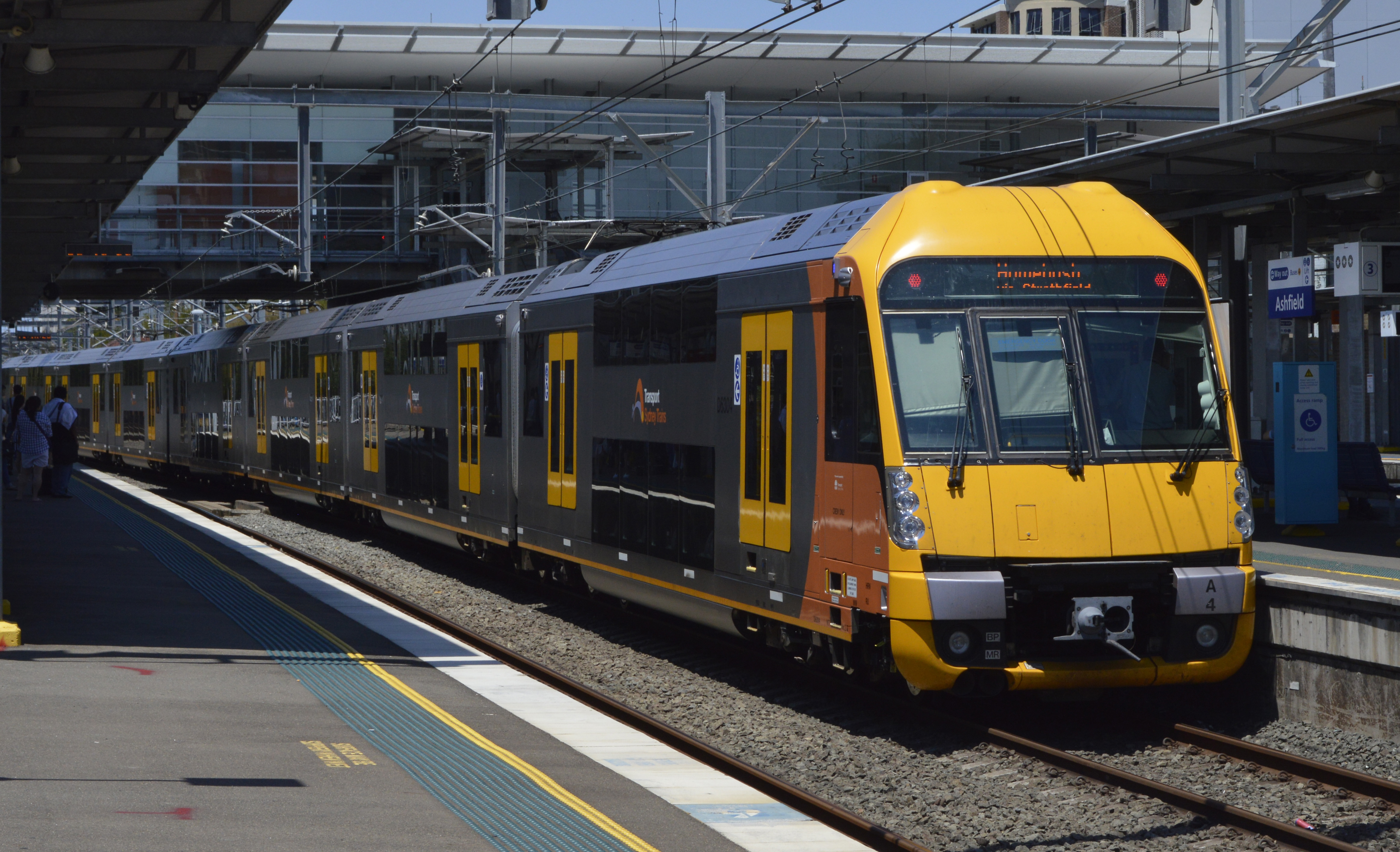
An A set at Ashfield station, operating on the Sydney Trains network

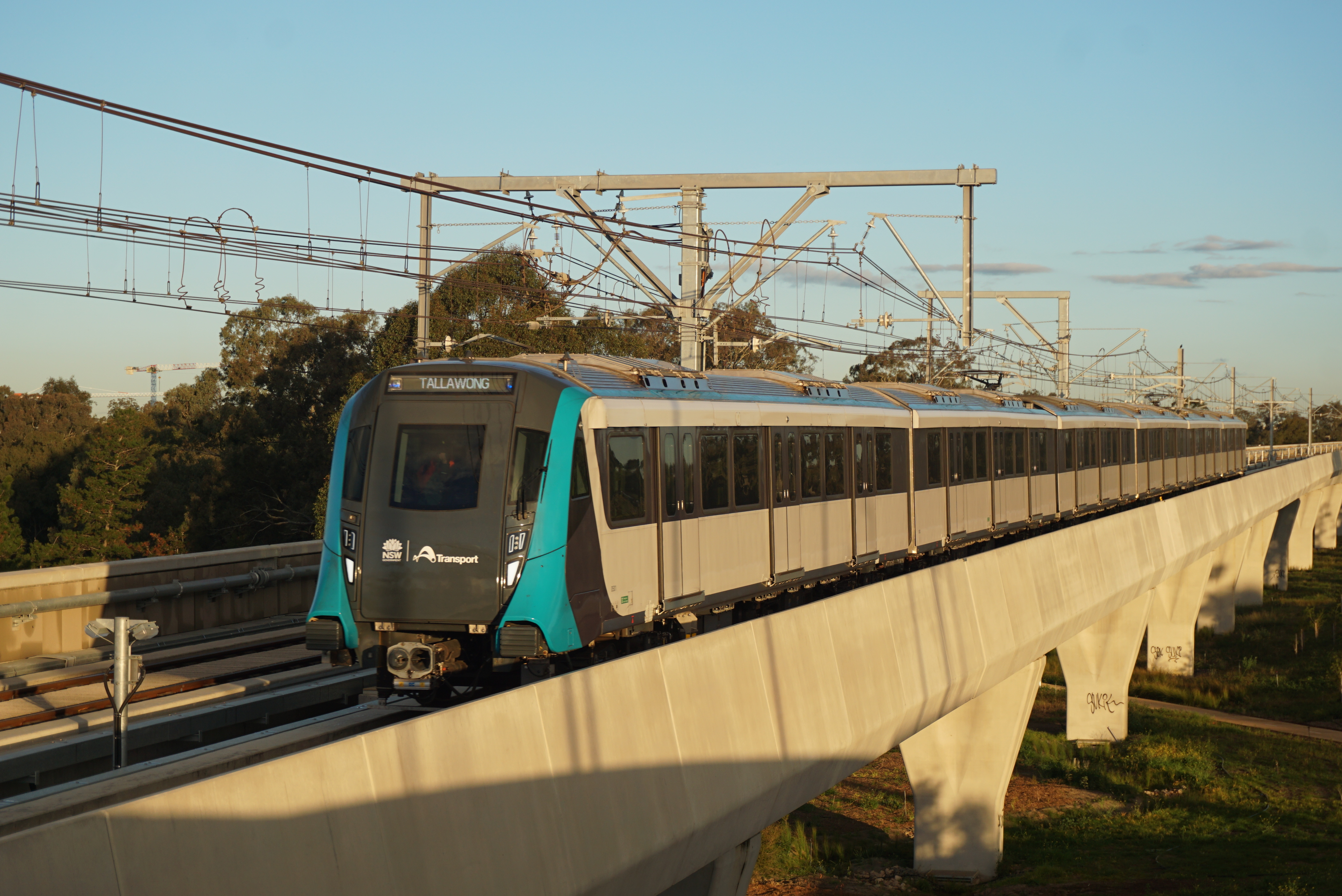
A Metropolis Stock automated train in service on the Sydney Metro network

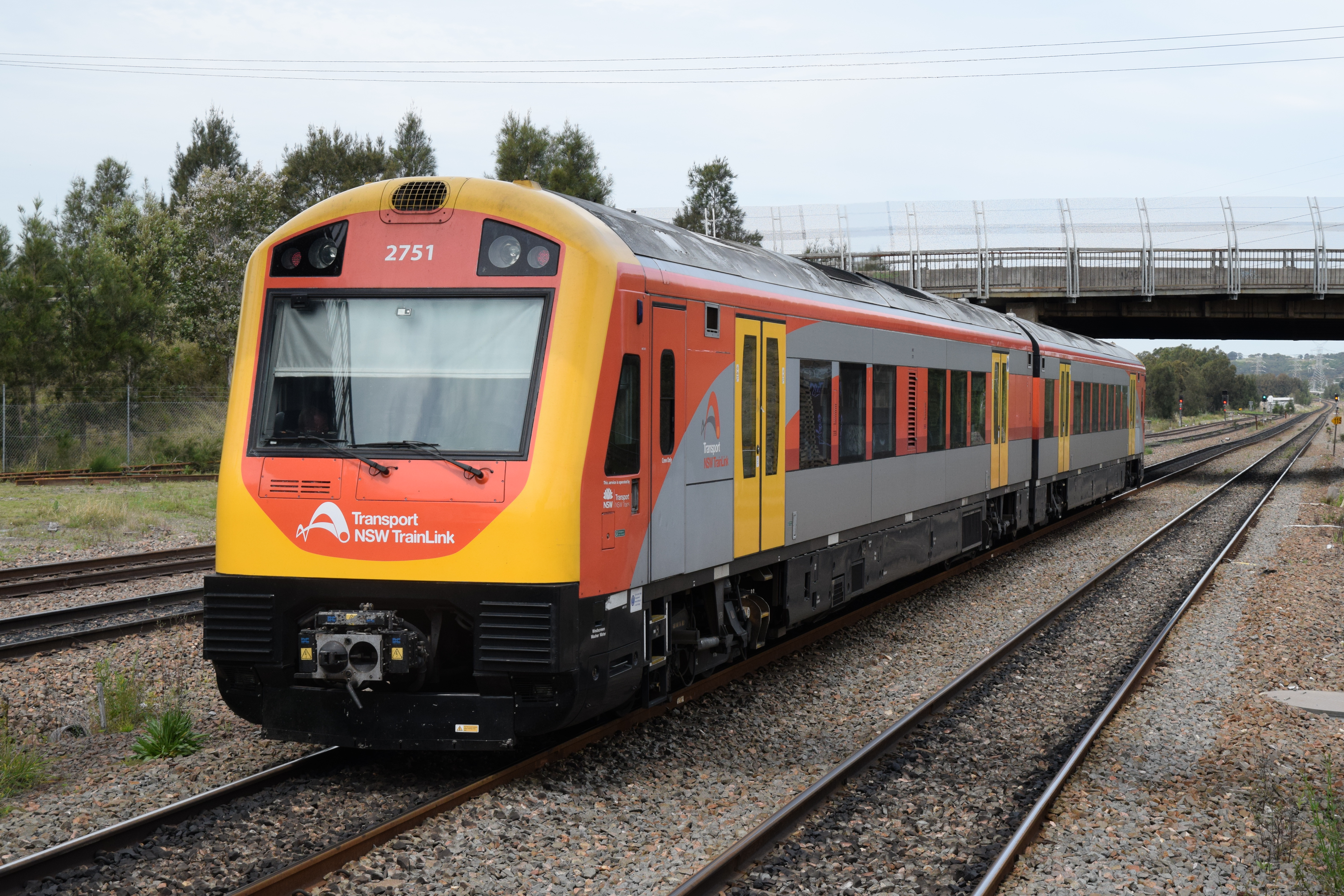
A Hunter railcar operated by NSW TrainLink

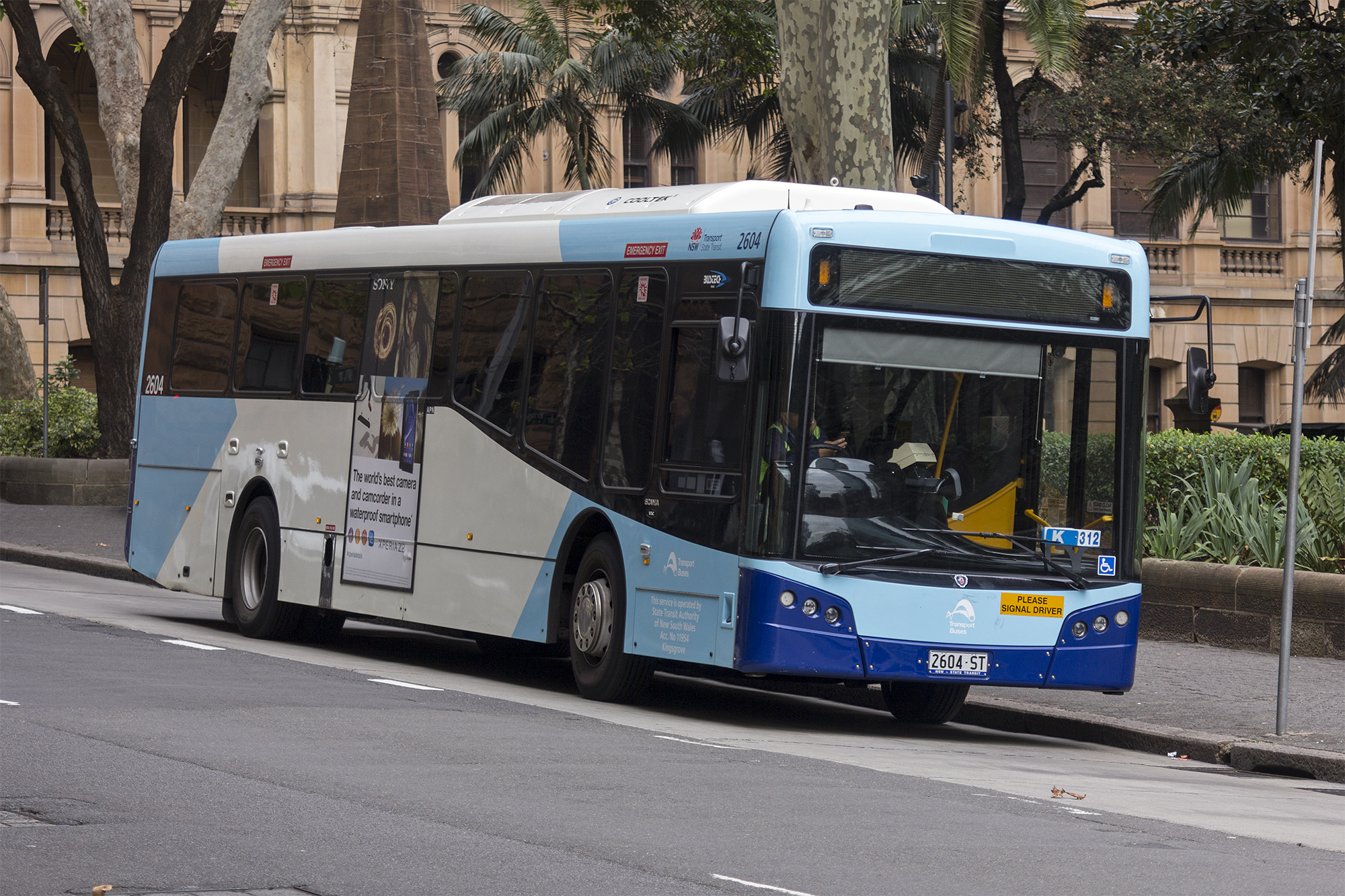
A Bustech VST bodied Scania K280UB operated by State Transit

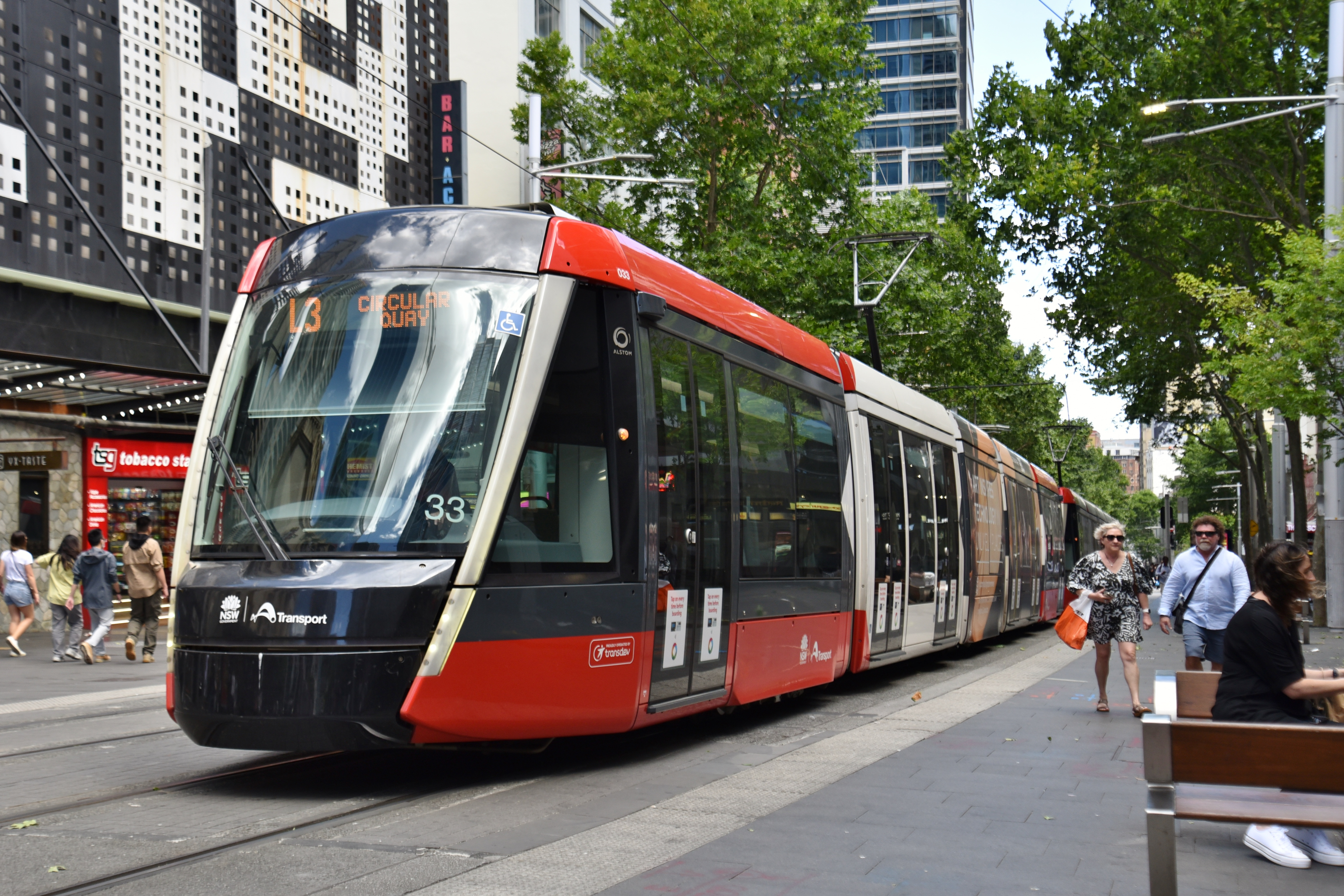
A Citadis 305 operating on the Sydney Light Rail network

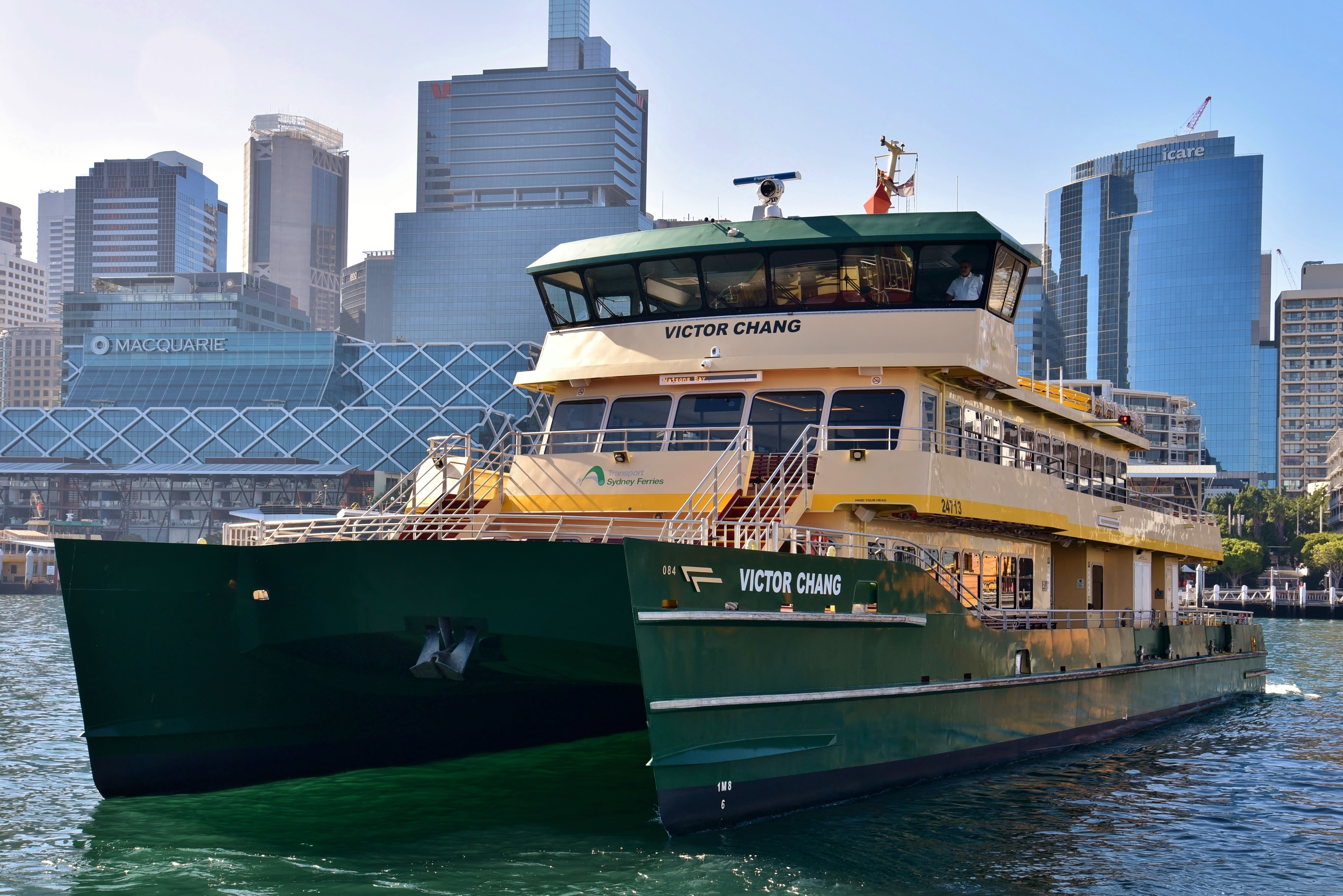
An Emerald-class ferry in service on the Sydney Ferries network

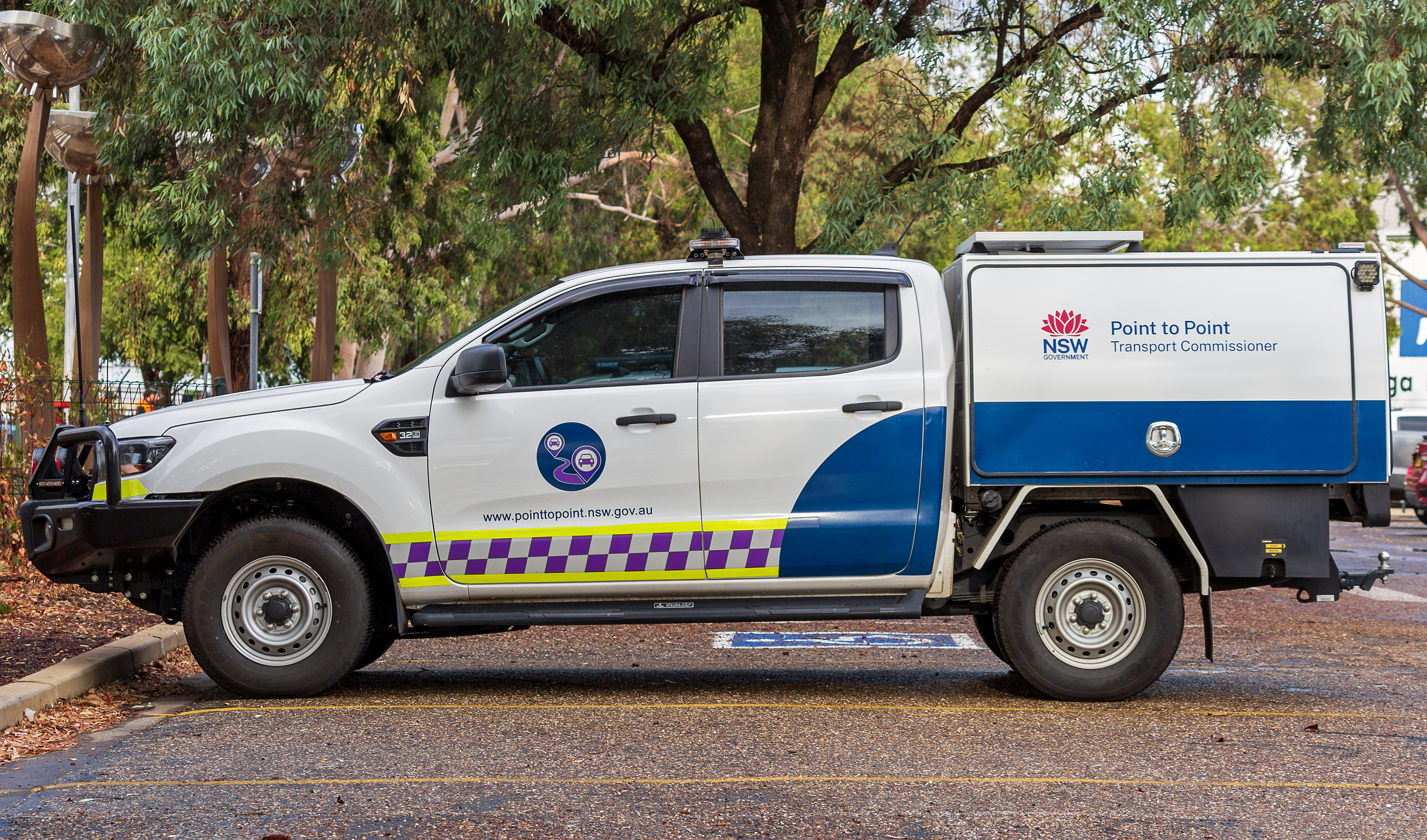
Point to Point Transport Commissioner Inspector

The authority was initially created as an integrated transport authority with six divisions, each headed by a deputy director general:

- Customer experience – to ensure journeys are as simple and seamless as possible;
- Planning and programs – to consolidate planning for all modes and develop a comprehensive transport masterplan;
- Transport services – to ensure transport services cost-effectively meet the current and future needs of customers;
- Transport projects – to manage major projects;
- Freight and regional development – to coordinate freight services and facilities, with particular focus on regional NSW; and
- Policy and regulation – to develop and oversight policies and laws pertaining to transport across the state

As of January 2025, Transport for NSW is structured as follows:

- Operational divisions
  - Coordinator General
  - Road Maintenance and Resilience
  - Sydney Trains
  - NSW TrainLink
  - Sydney Metro
- Enabling divisions
  - Finance, Technology and Commercial
  - People, Communication and Workplaces
- Policy/Regulatory divisions
  - Safety, Policy, Environment and Regulation
- Delivery division
  - Infrastructure Projects and Engineering
- Voice of Customer division
  - Planning, Integration and Passenger
- Secretary-led branches
  - Legal and Governance
  - Strategy
  - Security, Crisis and Emergency Management

The latest org chart (as of February 2026) was published in December 2025. A chart was also published in March 2025, which had changed significantly changed from a 2022 chart.

=== Entities ===
The NSW Department of Transport comprises the following entities:

- Transport Service of New South Wales
- Transport for NSW and its divisions and entities

Transport Service of NSW is an agency created in November 2011, in charge of employing staff for Transport for NSW, which cannot directly employ staff, to undertake its functions. The Transport Service also directly employs staff for State Transit Authority (STA), as well as senior executives of Sydney Trains and NSW Trains.

As of 2025, the entities of the Transport for NSW, as detailed in Transport Administration Act 1988, are:

- NSW Trains
- Sydney Ferries
- State Transit Authority (STA)
- Sydney Trains
- NSW Trains
- Residual Transport Corporation (RTC) – created in July 2017
- Sydney Metro – created in July 2018
- NSW Motorways

Out of these, STA, Sydney Trains, Sydney Metro, and NSW Trains are government transport agencies.

=== Departmental leadership ===
The following individuals have served as Secretary of Transport for NSW, or any precedent titles:

Ordinal	Name	Title	Term start	Term end	Time in office	Notes
1	Les Wielinga	Director-General	20 April 2011	24 September 2013	2 years, 157 days	
2	Dave Stewart	Director-General	17 October 2013	16 February 2015	1 year, 122 days	
3	Tim Reardon	Secretary	1 July 2015	10 November 2017	2 years, 132 days	
4	Rodd Staples	Secretary	18 November 2017	19 February 2021	3 years, 93 days	
5	Rob Sharp	Secretary	7 April 2021	14 April 2023	2 years, 7 days	
6	Josh Murray	Secretary	13 July 2023	incumbent	3 years, 126 days	

The Secretary of Transport for NSW is responsible to the Ministers listed below.

=== Ministers ===
The following ministers are responsible for administering the Transport cluster:

- Minister for Transport, currently The Hon John Graham MLC
- Minister for Roads and Minister for Regional Transport, currently The Hon Jenny Aitchison MP

Ultimately, the Ministers are answerable to the Parliament of New South Wales.

== Public transport services ==
The branding for public transport in NSW, dubbed 'The Hop'

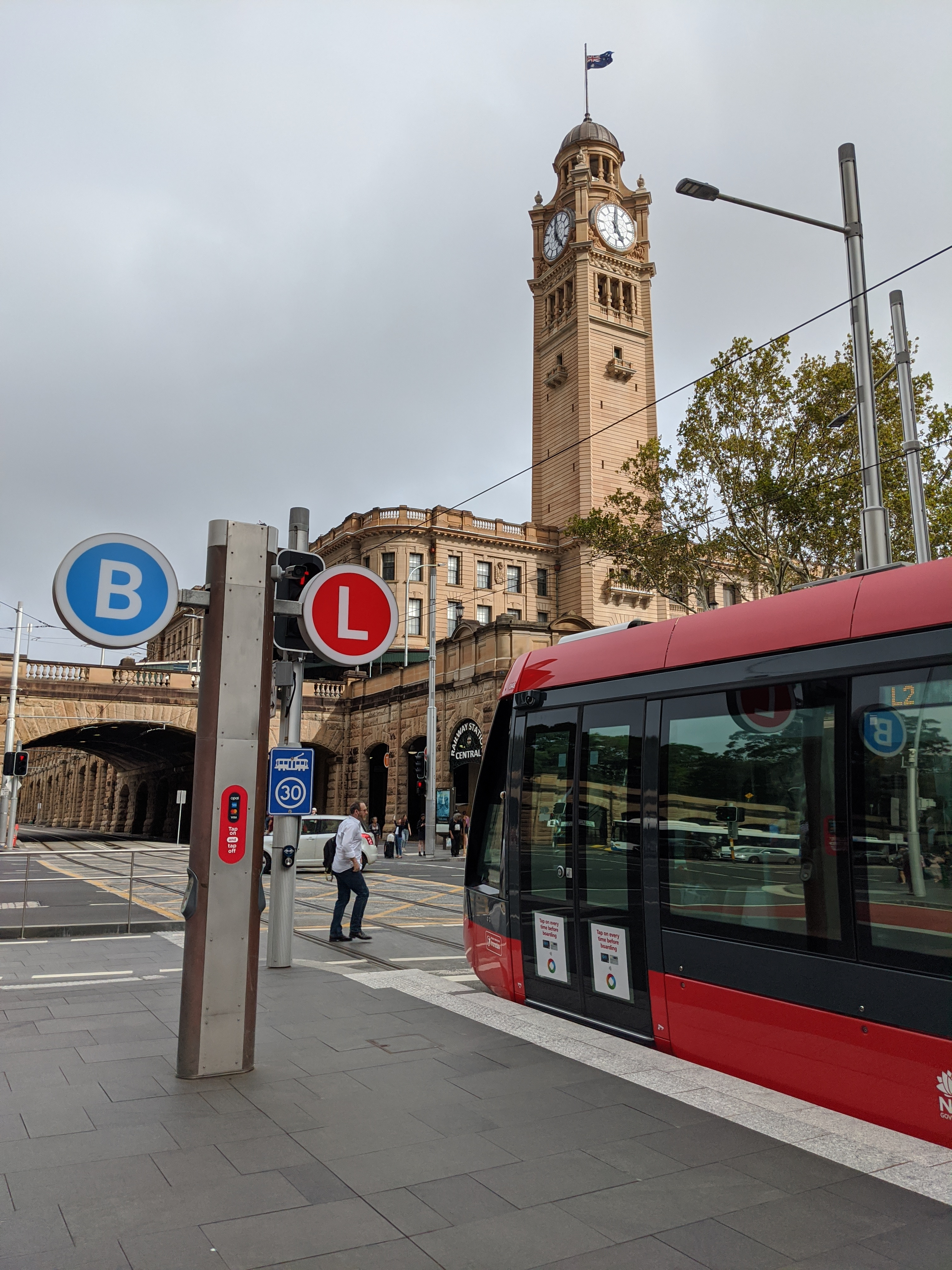
Bus (B) and light rail (L) roundels

Transport for NSW directly manages most train, bus, ferry and light rail services in New South Wales. The authority manages the route design, timetabling and branding of these services and also provides passenger information via printed material, a telephone service and a website. Operation of the services is contracted out to a mixture of other government-owned organisations and private enterprise.

Transport for NSW public transport services are simply branded Transport. The following sub-brands are used depending on the type of service:

- Sydney Metro – rapid transit services in Sydney
- Sydney Trains – suburban train services in Sydney
- NSW TrainLink – medium and long distance train and coach services throughout the state and extending interstate into Australian Capital Territory, Victoria, South Australia and Queensland
- Buses – bus services in Greater Sydney, Blue Mountains, Central Coast and Wollongong
- Sydney Ferries – ferry services in Sydney
- Sydney Light Rail – light rail services in Sydney
- Newcastle Transport – bus, ferry and light rail services in Newcastle

Passengers made 765 million public transport journeys in the 2017–18 financial year. Patronage on the Sydney rail network increased during this period–customer patronage grew by 10.5 per cent, while intercity patronage grew by 11 per cent.

=== Transport NSW Info ===
Transport for NSW provides a trip planner and transport service information on its customer service website, transportnsw.info, and via its 24-hour information line, 131 500. These services, outsourced to Serco since July 2010, were previously known as the Transport Info Line or simply 131 500. A parallel Teletype service for hearing and speech impaired passengers is available on 1800 637 500.

== Infrastructure ==
=== Public transport projects ===
==== Current ====
Project	Mode	Completion date
Sydney Metro West	Rapid transit	2032
Sydney Metro Western Sydney Airport (stage 1)	Rapid transit	Late 2027–2028
Regional Rail Fleet	Rolling stock	2028
Parramatta Light Rail Stage 2	Light rail	TBC
Digital Systems Program	Commuter rail	First deployment area 2025
Safe, Accessible Transport (SAT) Program (formerly the Transport Access Program)	Public transport interchange	ongoing
Rail Service Improvement Program (formerly known as the More Trains More Services Program)	Commuter rail	ongoing
Power Supply Upgrade Program	ongoing	
Opal 2.0	Ticketing system (Note: Project is estimated to be complete by September 2027.)	ongoing

==== Completed ====
Project		Mode	Completed	Notes
Sydney Metro City & Southwest (Bankstown part)		Rapid transit	30 October 2026	
New Intercity Fleet (NIF) (Mariyung)		Rolling stock	Ongoing since December 2024	
Sydney Metro City & Southwest (City part)		Rapid transit	19 August 2024	
Kingsgrove to Revesby quadruplication	Rail Clearways Program	Suburban rail	April 2013	
Liverpool Turnback	Rail Clearways Program	Suburban rail	January 2014	
Lilyfield – Dulwich Hill Light Rail Extension		Light rail	March 2014	
Monorail Removal Project		Monorail	April 2014	
Opal card rollout		Electronic ticketing system	December 2014	
South West Rail Link		Suburban rail	February 2015	
Gosford passing loops	Northern Sydney Freight Corridor	Freight rail	February 2015	
North Strathfield underpass	Northern Sydney Freight Corridor	Freight rail	June 2015	
Epping to Thornleigh triplication	Northern Sydney Freight Corridor	Freight rail	June 2016	
Wynyard Walk		Pedestrian	20 September 2016	
Northern Beaches B-Line (Sydney)		Bus rapid transit	26 November 2017	
Newcastle Light Rail		Light rail	18 February 2019	
Sydney Metro Northwest		Rapid transit	May 2019	
Sydney Growth Trains		Rolling stock	September 2019	
CBD and South East Light Rail	L2 Randwick Line	Light rail	14 December 2019	
CBD and South East Light Rail	L3 Kingsford Line	Light rail	3 April 2020	
Digital Train Radio System		Heavy rail	April 2020	
Automatic Train Protection		Heavy rail	June 2022	
Redfern Station Upgrade		Public Transport Interchange	October 2023	
Parramatta Light Rail Stage 1	L4 Westmead and Carlingford Line	Light rail	20 December 2024	
Parramatta Turnback		Heavy rail	October 2016	
MetroNet Removal Project		Removing an old train radio system	April 2020	
Hexham freight loop		Upgrades to an existing freight route corridor	June 2012	
Blacktown crossover		New heavy rail facilities	Early 2018	
Arncliffe Pedestrian Link		Pedestrian	July 2016	

=== Roads ===
==== Current ====
Project	Description	Completion date
Princes Highway upgrade	Upgrading to four-lane dual carriageway from the Jervis Bay turnoff to link up with the Sydney Orbital Network near Mascot	ongoing
Warringah Freeway upgrade	Upgrade to existing freeway	2026
Western Harbour Tunnel	New road tunnel	2028
M12 Motorway	Motorway intended to connect to the new Western Sydney Airport	Prior to the Airport's opening in 2026

==== Completed ====
Project	Description	Completion date
NorthConnex	Road tunnel	31 October 2020
WestConnex	Road tunnel	20 January 2023
Pacific Highway upgrade	Upgrading to continuous minimum four-lane dual carriageway between Hexham and Tweed Heads	December 2020
Sydney Gateway	New motorway	1 September 2024

== Criticism ==
=== Corruption ===
In 2025, TfNSW was "embroiled" in its fourth corruption scandal in six years.

In mid 2025, the Independent Commission Against Corruption (ICAC) begun an investigation into whether Transport for NSW staff had awarded contracts to, or favouring companies, in return for benefits, since 2012.

During an interview with A Current Affair in June 2025, a whisleblower claimed to have witnessed corruption worth more than $110 million inside Transport for NSW.

The Guardian reported that a probe in October 2025 was the fourth public inquiry since 2019 into claims of corruption in procurement in Transport for NSW, which had a $23 billion annual budget.

In October 2025, The Sydney Morning Herald reported that nearly half of staff were reluctant to speak up about tough issues, which may "range from alleged corruption or malpractice to workplace matters".

The Sydney Morning Herald described the $343 million kickback scandal as "engulfing" the government agency in January 2026.

=== Automotive traffic prioritisation ===
In 2017, the The Sydney Morning Herald reported a internal Transport for NSW memo, released under freedom of information laws, referring to a Cabinet directive to not consider public transport alternatives to road projects. It suggested Cabinet banned consideration of public transport alternatives to toll road projects including the F6 Extension (M6 Motorway), Western Harbour Tunnel and Beaches Link.

In February 2026 Rob Stokes (the former New South Wales Minister for Transport) stated the final design of the Sydney Fish Market shared bike path reflected "very ingrained views" inside government that backed road traffic over pedestrians and cyclists, which was reported by ABC News. He characterised the situation as "two clans" inside Transport for NSW, stating "There were those who were very people-focused, then there were those who were almost vehicle-focused" – and that decisions on cycle infrastructure around the market "had been made by the latter group". Rob Stokes described "very powerful vested interests" that prioritised large road and rail infrastructure over active transport infrastructure due to a revolving door between government and the private sector.

In July 2026, a senior road engineer that worked in the state roads department for two decades claimed "You've got very powerful roads bureaucrats inside Transport for NSW that think big roads are the solution to every problem".

Bicycle NSW stated in 2023 there was a fundamental disconnect in Transport for NSW. They claimed some branches were "dedicated to achieving place outcomes and enabling more active transport", however "a powerful but fossilised group continues with the car-first mantra". Bicycle NSW described the agency publishing two plans for the same area (Pyrmont) "at cross purposes" at the same time. Gabriel Metcalf, the chief executive of the Committee for Sydney, said the proposed Pyrmont changes were made by an "old guard of traffic engineers" at Transport for NSW. State MP for Sydney Alex Greenwich described the car-first plan as "more 1950s road planning".

The "Impact of the Rozelle Interchange" Parliamentary Inquiry found "The evidence from cycling advocates was particularly damning, with the community promised improvements to cycling and pedestrian infrastructure that weren't delivered." The Guardian stated in 2021 that "Above all, old habits die hard among officials in the roads bureaucracy."

In 2021, the City of Sydney executive manager of cycling strategy claimed "It doesn't matter what the minister or the executives at Transport for NSW are saying, you still have the people who’ve been doing this for 40 years who say, 'Ah, no mate, can't possibly happen.'" In 2024 the Manager of Cycling Strategy claimed that active transport components of a motorway project were removed without the Minister being told, which exposed some Transport for NSW staff who "aren't following what the policies say or what the Minister wants." They claimed although "There are a lot of good people in Transport for New South Wales and some have written good policies and strategies", the problem is "the people who have the power to veto any of our projects don’t sing by the same song sheet."

In 2025 the Committee for Sydney claimed Transport for NSW policies are "fantastic in intent", however they are "frequently ignored by bureaucrats in decision making and projects." The "Road User Space Allocation Policy Implementation Review Report" ('RUSAP Review') found "There is no clarity in accountability (or responsibility) for decision-making on road space allocation."

==== Parramatta Road ====
In 2024, NSW Roads Minister John Graham was forced to intervene after Transport for NSW planned to demolish 196 homes and businesses to add an extra lane to Parramatta Road.

In December 2023, Transport for NSW claimed the Parramatta Road Corridor transit route and active transport improvements require road widening.

Inner West Council independent councillor Pauline Lockie stated Transport for NSW's plans "seem to be contrary to everything the state government is trying to do to revitalise Parramatta Road, particularly given the community was promised a reduction in traffic once WestConnex opened".

The Inner West Council sought written confirmation from Transport for NSW that the submission on proposed road widenings was withdrawn and noted "the WestConnex approval conditions required dedicated public transport lanes, that were not delivered by the previous NSW Government".

The Committee for Sydney argued it was not necessary to acquire properties along Parramatta Road to put in better public transport.

=== Rolling stock procurement ===
A report by the Audit Office of NSW found the government overspent $1 billion on the procurement of intercity trains in New South Wales because of "foreseeable changes". The report found TfNSW "did not effectively procure" the New South Wales D set (New Intercity Fleet) and New South Wales R set (Regional Rail Fleet).

=== Bus operation ===
A January 2025 report by the NSW Auditor-General Bola Oyetunji outlined the failures of Transport for NSW in management of multi-million-dollar bus contracts across metropolitan Sydney.

The report found operators are not consistently meeting their performance obligations for on-time running and cancelled trips.

A number of recommendations were made for improving bus operation were made in a May 2024 NSW Bus Industry Taskforce report.
