= Marrong Reserve =

Nature reserve in Sydney, Australia

Mar-rong Reserve
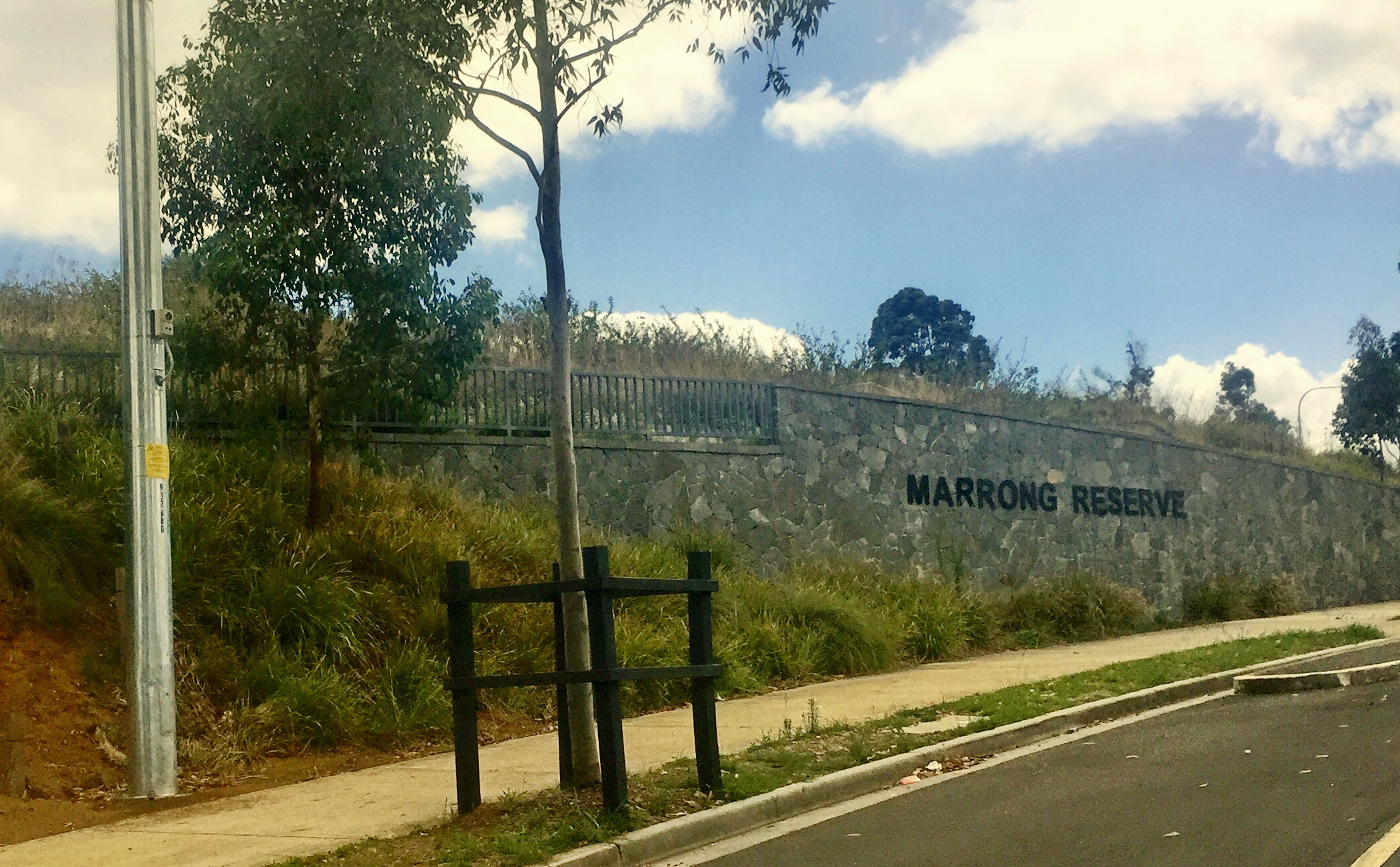
- Entrance to the reserve with a feature wall displaying the name
- Interactive map of Mar-rong Reserve
- Type: Nature reserve, urban park
- Location: Pemulwuy, New South Wales, Australia
- Coordinates: 33°49′00″S 150°55′35″E
- Area: 21.1 ha (52 acres)
- Operator: Cumberland City Council
- Designation: May 4, 2015

Marrong Reserve, also known as Pemulwuy Lookout and Ridgeline Reserve, is a nature reserve, urban park and scenic lookout in Western Sydney, New South Wales, Australia. The J-shaped reserve extends along the Marrong ridgeline between Pemulwuy and the Lower Prospect Canal Reserve, approximately 9 kilometres (5.6 mi) west of Parramatta and 33 kilometres (21 mi) north-west of the Sydney CBD. Because of its cultural and historical importance, the reserve was added to the New South Wales State Heritage Register on 17 October 2003. It is used for walking, exercise, recreation, sightseeing, birdwatching, ball games and the gathering of bush tucker.

The reserve broadly follows Daruga Avenue in Pemulwuy and extends south towards the Lower Prospect Canal Reserve. Its elevated position provides views towards the Sydney skyline and the Blue Mountains, making it a popular location for viewing the New Year's Eve and Australia Day fireworks. Interpretive and educational material is located throughout the reserve. Most of the site outside the developed parkland is classified as Natural Area-Bushland. Marrong Reserve forms part of the same ridgeline system as Prospect Hill, although the two are separated by a saddle occupied by Butu Wargun Drive. The reserve is divided into three precincts: Marrong Reserve North, Marrong Reserve "Saddle Bund" and Marrong Reserve South.

== History ==
The land occupied by Marrong Reserve has traditional associations with the Cannemegal-Warmuli clan of the Darug nation. Elevated places such as the Marrong ridgeline held cultural and practical significance for Aboriginal people, including as locations for ceremonies, hunting and observation. Archaeological excavations at the Nelsons Ridge site revealed various artefacts, although the site has been characterised as being used temporarily rather than as a permanent occupation area. Watkin Tench travelled through the area in 1789, while during the Aboriginal resistance of 1790, Pemulwuy is associated with the use of the Marrong ridgeline and Prospect Hill as a lookout. Governor Arthur Phillip subsequently issued 30-acre land grants to convicts on the southern and eastern slopes, and the area continued to be used for agriculture. Basalt plug quarrying began along the western side of the reserve during the mid-19th century.

=== Urban development ===
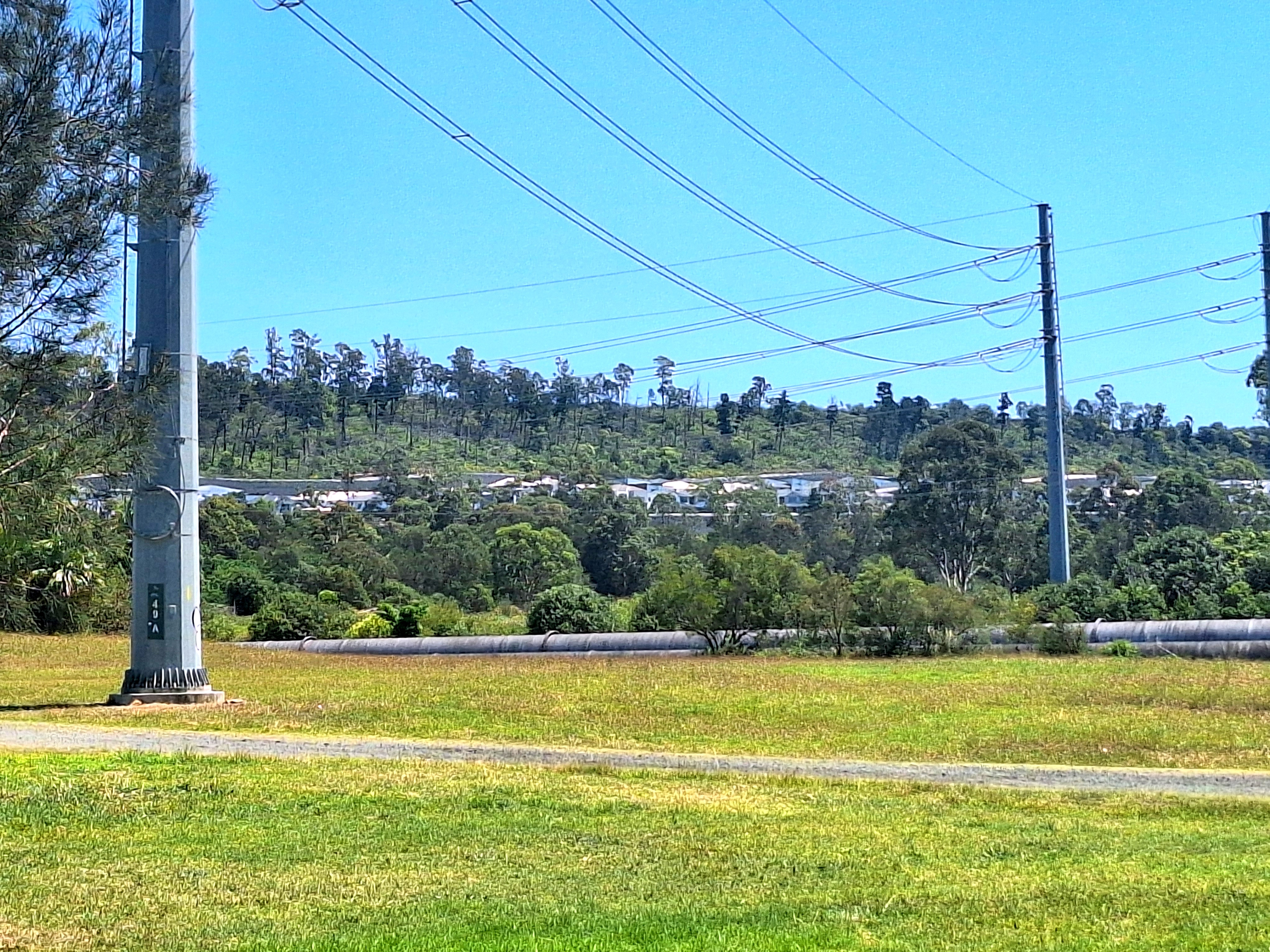
The Southern Residential lands on 'Marrong Reserve South', Pemulwuy

The landscape was substantially altered during the development of the surrounding residential and employment areas. In 1999, the central saddle was modified through the excavation of a road cutting on its eastern side, while excavated and imported fill was used elsewhere in the Northern and Southern Employment Lands. The 1999 rezoning of land associated with the Greystanes Estate, including the previous Boral and CSIRO places at Greystanes, provided for employment, residential and regional open-space uses. Precinct planning controls subsequently established areas of open space within the new developments, including the land that became Marrong Reserve.

In 2002, Lend Lease and Boral formed a joint venture to develop the residential area that became known as Nelson's Ridge Estate. Together with the neighbouring Lakewood Estate, it forms much of the residential area of Pemulwuy. Nelson's Ridge takes its name from Nelson Lawson, the owner of the former Greystanes Estate who commissioned the construction of Greystanes House in 1837. Lend Lease developed the estate in two stages, covering northern and southern employment and residential lands. The former CSIRO site north of Nelson's Ridge was vacated in January 2002 and sold to Stockland in March of that year.

Marrong Reserve was developed as part of the Nelsons Ridge suburban development, with construction taking place from 2013 to 2014. The reserve was transferred to Holroyd City Council in 2015, and a walking track, lookout and play facilities were established between Biana and Binnet streets. The reserve was officially opened on 4 May 2015 by Greg Cummings, Mayor of Holroyd City Council, and Darug leader Aunty Sandra Lee. A children's playground, lookout platform and additional landscaping were completed in the Saddle Bund precinct in 2016. Negotiations between the council and Boral concerning the reserve began in August 2015. The site was subsequently closed during 2016 amid maintenance work and a public liability dispute, with access restored following completion of the land transfer in early 2017.

On 31 December 2019, a grassfire affected the southern portion of Marrong Reserve during the 2019–20 Australian bushfire season. By 2021, Boral had commenced excavation and site preparation at the foundation of the reserve for an extension of Pemulwuy's residential development between the Canal Walkway and the Lower Prospect Canal Reserve. In July 2025, Marrong Reserve was among the sites used by residents participating in National Tree Day. The Northern Residential lands east of the reserve were developed from the early 2010s, while construction of the Southern Residential lands began in 2021 and was completed by 2025.

== Geography ==
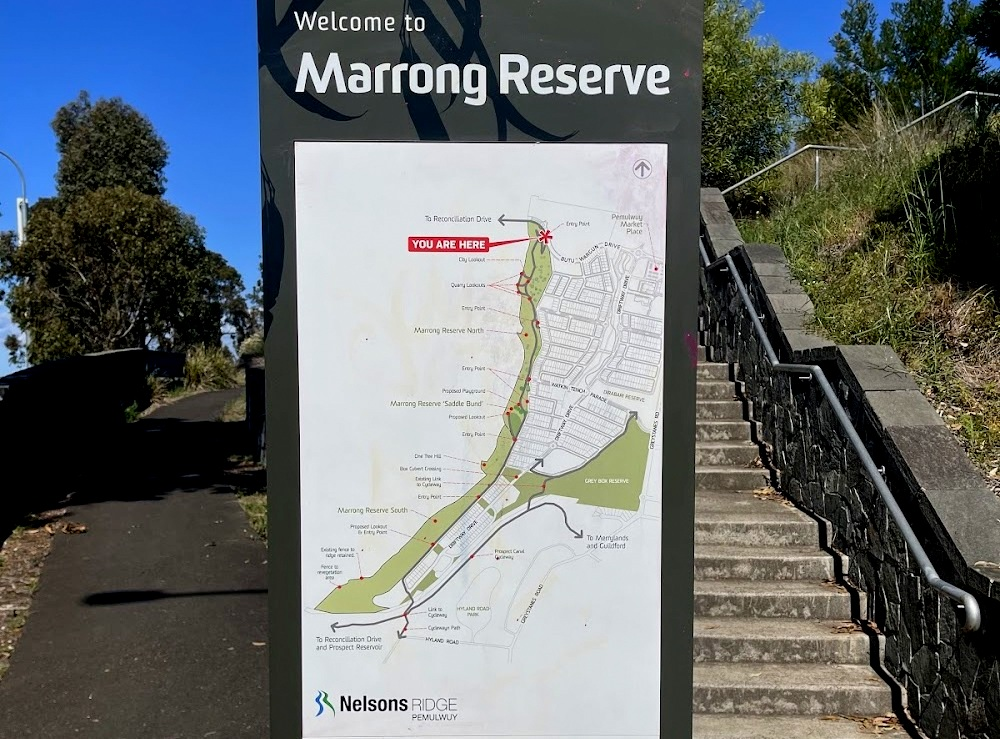
Site map of the reserve

Marrong Reserve occupies a narrow, approximately 100-metre (330 ft)-wide ridge extending for about 2.3 kilometres (1.4 mi) from Butu Wargun Drive and Reconciliation Rise in the north to Prospect Highway in the south. The ridge follows a generally north-south alignment and takes a J-shaped form, with its northern section broadly following Daruga Avenue. A saddle or col separates it from Prospect Hill to the north. However, the northern section between Marrong Reserve North and the Saddle Bund has at times been included within the Prospect Hill heritage area.

The reserve covers approximately 21.1 hectares (52 acres) within the former 110 hectares (270 acres) Nelsons Ridge Estate development. Its western boundary is defined in part by the steep wall of the former Prospect quarry, which falls sharply towards the Greystanes Employment Lands. The southern section has steeper terrain and more limited accessibility, while recreational facilities are concentrated towards the northern section.

Marrong Reserve forms part of the broader open-space network surrounding Prospect Hill, the Prospect Creek riparian corridor, the Lower Prospect Canal Reserve and the Prospect Reservoir pipeline belt. It lies south of the M4 Motorway and Great Western Highway, with road access from Greystanes Road and surrounding streets. Pedestrian and cycling paths through Pemulwuy provide access to the reserve, while bollards restrict vehicle entry.

=== Precincts ===
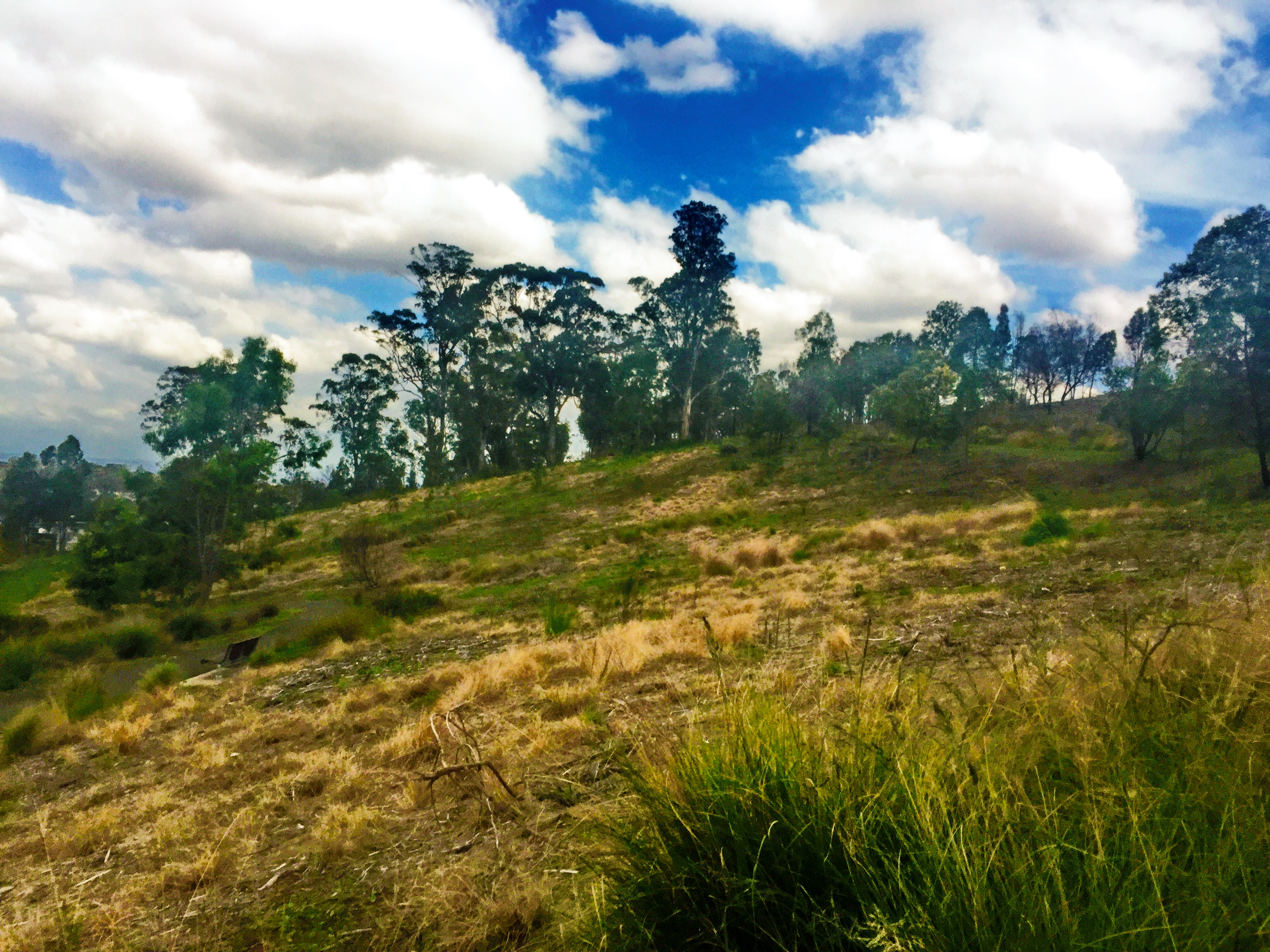
The northern precinct is the most elevated and hilly part of the reserve

- Marrong Reserve North is located around Butu Wargun Drive and Daruga Avenue and reaches an elevation of approximately 117 metres (384 ft). The summit contains walking paths, seating, drinking fountains, signage and native plantings, together with a viewing platform offering views towards the Sydney CBD, Sydney Olympic Park, Parramatta, the North Shore and the Blue Mountains. Red-bellied black snakes have been recorded in the area, with warning signs installed along the paths. The western side overlooks the restored face of Prospect Quarry. Before quarrying reduced its height, the summit reached approximately 122 metres (400 ft) and contained a trigonometrical point known as Greystanes. The area is also colloquially known as Pemulwuy Lookout.
- Marrong Reserve "Saddle Bund" occupies the central section of the ridge around Biana and Binnet streets. A walking track leads towards the higher ground and a lookout overlooks the former quarry and industrial area to the west. The precinct was opened to the public in 2023 and includes a stage and an interpretive garden relating to Aboriginal heritage. Nearby is "One Tree Hill", marked by a Moreton Bay fig tree believed to be more than 150 years old. The site formed part of the former Greystanes House property of Nelson Lawson but is not accessible to the public.
- Marrong Reserve South extends south towards the Lower Prospect Canal Reserve. The summit is relatively level but bordered by steep slopes and reaches approximately 100 metres (330 ft) above sea level. The Lower Prospect Canal Reserve walkway and cycleway follows the southeastern base of the ridge. Vegetation includes pampas grass, Ipomoea cairica, Lantana camara, Acacia longifolia and stands of Monterey pine. Grey box and river oak are also present. The summit provides views across southern Western Sydney and can be reached from Hyland Road or Prospect Highway.

=== Drainage ===
The ridgeline divides the reserve's drainage between several catchments. Rainfall south of Daruga Avenue drains towards Prospect Creek, eventually reaching the Georges River and Botany Bay, while the northern slopes drain towards Girraween Creek and the Parramatta River system. Runoff from the Saddle Bund primarily flows east into Daruga Avenue and a higher tributary of Greystanes Creek, which connects with Toongabbie Creek and the upper Parramatta River.

== Ecology ==
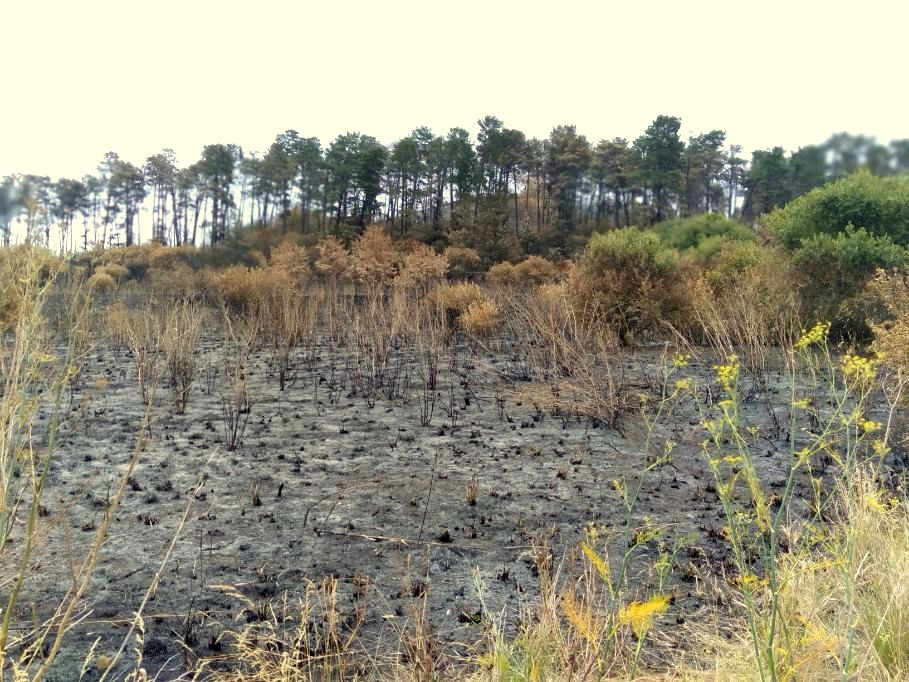
Marrong Reserve South after the 2019–20 Black Summer bushfires

Only fewer than 10% of the reserve's original vegetation remains. Native woodland species include forest red gum (Eucalyptus tereticornis), spotted gum (Corymbia maculata), and grey box (Eucalyptus moluccana), alongside smaller species such as hickory wattle (Acacia implexa) and Sydney green wattle (Acacia parramattensis subsp. parramattensis). Other native plants recorded include spiny thorn, yellow pittosporum, kidney weed, hairy clerodendrum, purple twining pea, native indigo and native grape. Plantings of Moreton Bay fig and bunya pine are affiliated with the preceding pasture boundaries of the Greystanes House property.

A plantation of Monterey pine, established by Boral between 1960 and 1970 to screen the quarry, formerly covered much of the ridgeline. The trees subsequently became invasive and were progressively removed. Weed species recorded in the reserve contain privet, Chilean needle grass (Nassella neesiana), morning glory and lantana. Bush regeneration has been undertaken since 2009, with substantial planting of native and indigenous species accompanying the development of paths and recreational areas in 2013. Further tree planting was undertaken with Greater Sydney Landcare in 2022.

The reserve's soils are predominantly associated with the Blacktown soil group and consist mainly of shallow to moderately deep clay soils with relatively low fertility and poor drainage. Some areas have been substantially modified through the deposition of building rubble and other fill material, reaching depths of up to 5.5 metres in places. Contamination has also been identified around the Saddle Bund area.

=== Wildlife ===
Wildlife recorded in the reserve includes several threatened species, including the Rüppell's broad-nosed bat, east-coast free-tailed bat, eastern false pipistrelle and powerful owl. The Cumberland Plain land snail is also present. Other recorded mammals feature the greater glider, eastern grey kangaroo, and common brushtail possum. Birds include the magpie-lark, bell miner, eastern rosella, Australian butcherbird, eastern yellow robin, Australian brushturkey, wrens, willie wagtail, Australian raven, sulphur-crested cockatoo, little corellas and galahs. Yellow-tailed black cockatoos were recorded in the reserve before the 2019–20 bushfires and the subsequent removal of the pine plantation. Reptiles include the red-bellied black snake, eastern brown snake and several species of lizard. Introduced species recorded at the reserve include hares, rabbits, cats, foxes and dogs.

== Gallery ==
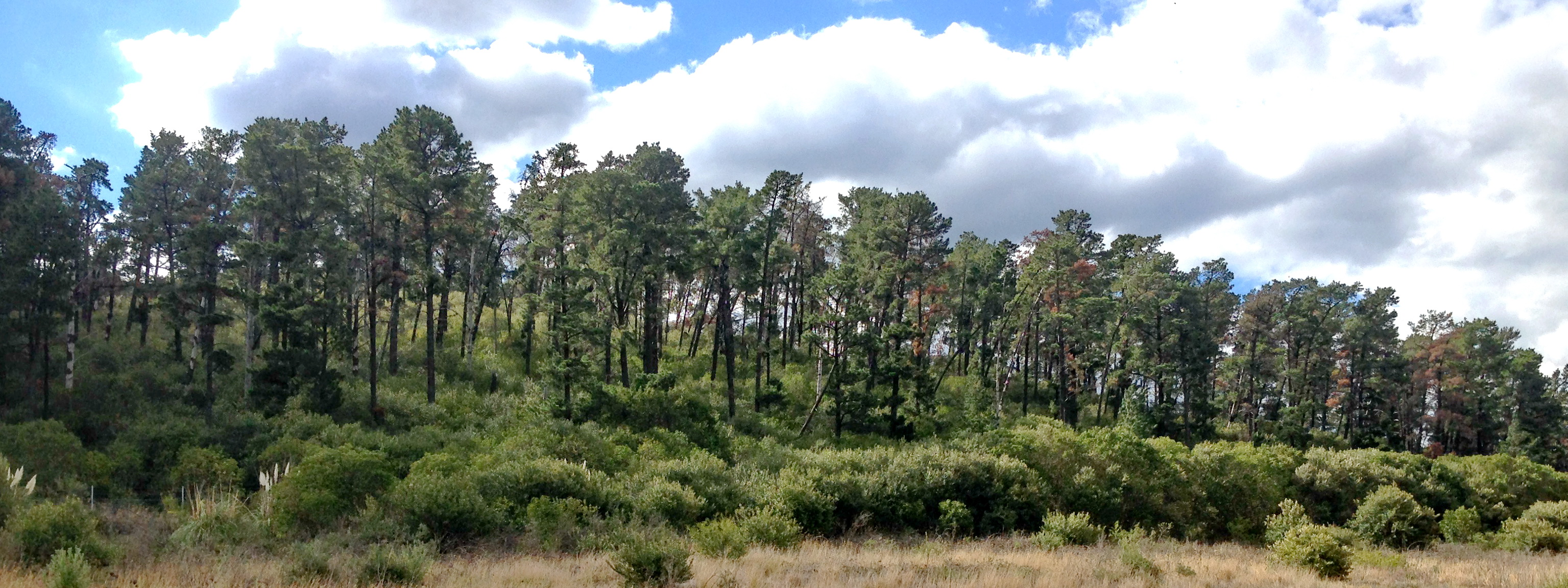
A collection of Pinus radiata that were introduced to the region in the late 19th century

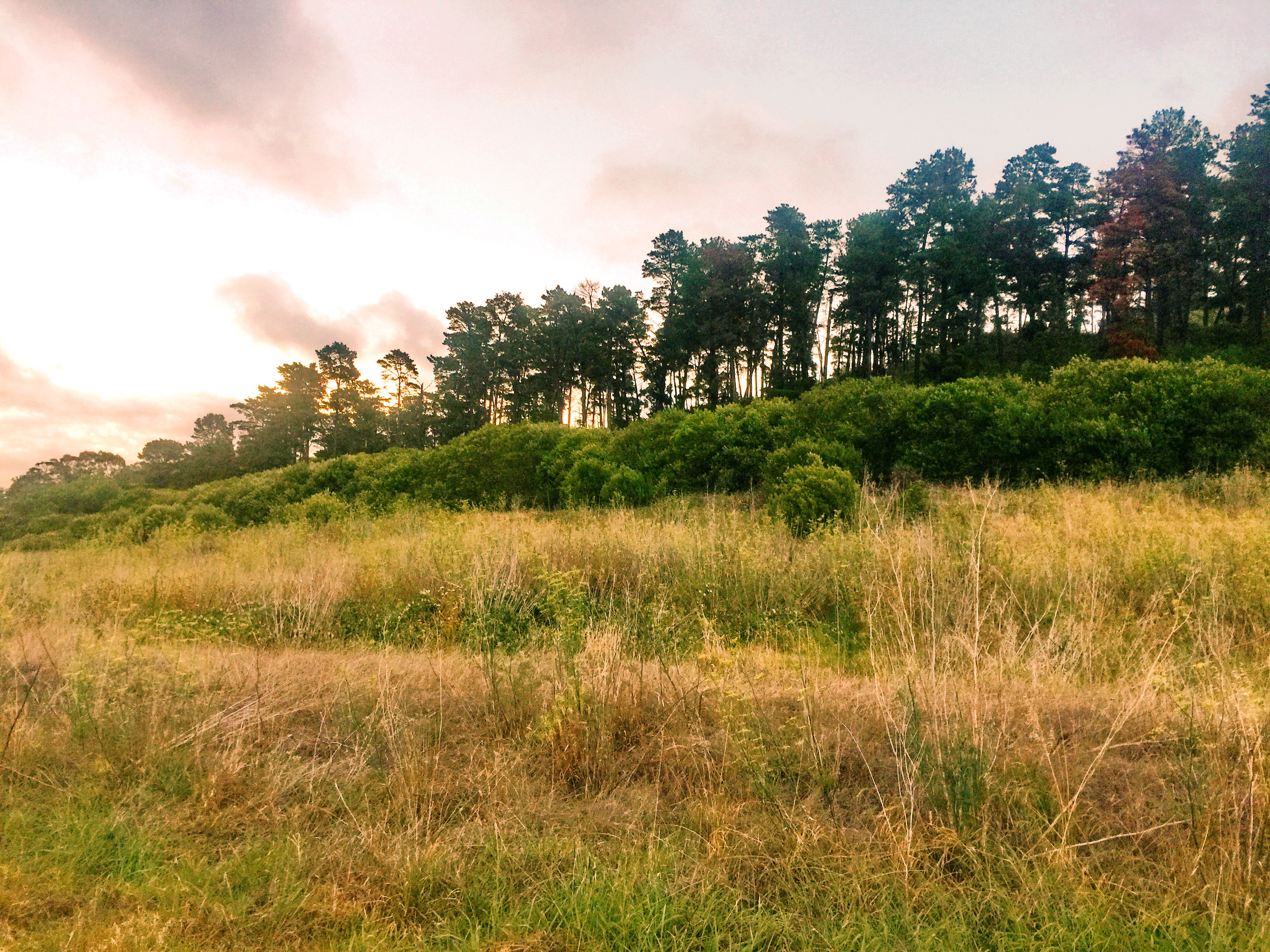
The southern summit of Marrong Reserve, before the Monterey pine were burnt down in the 2019–20 bushfires

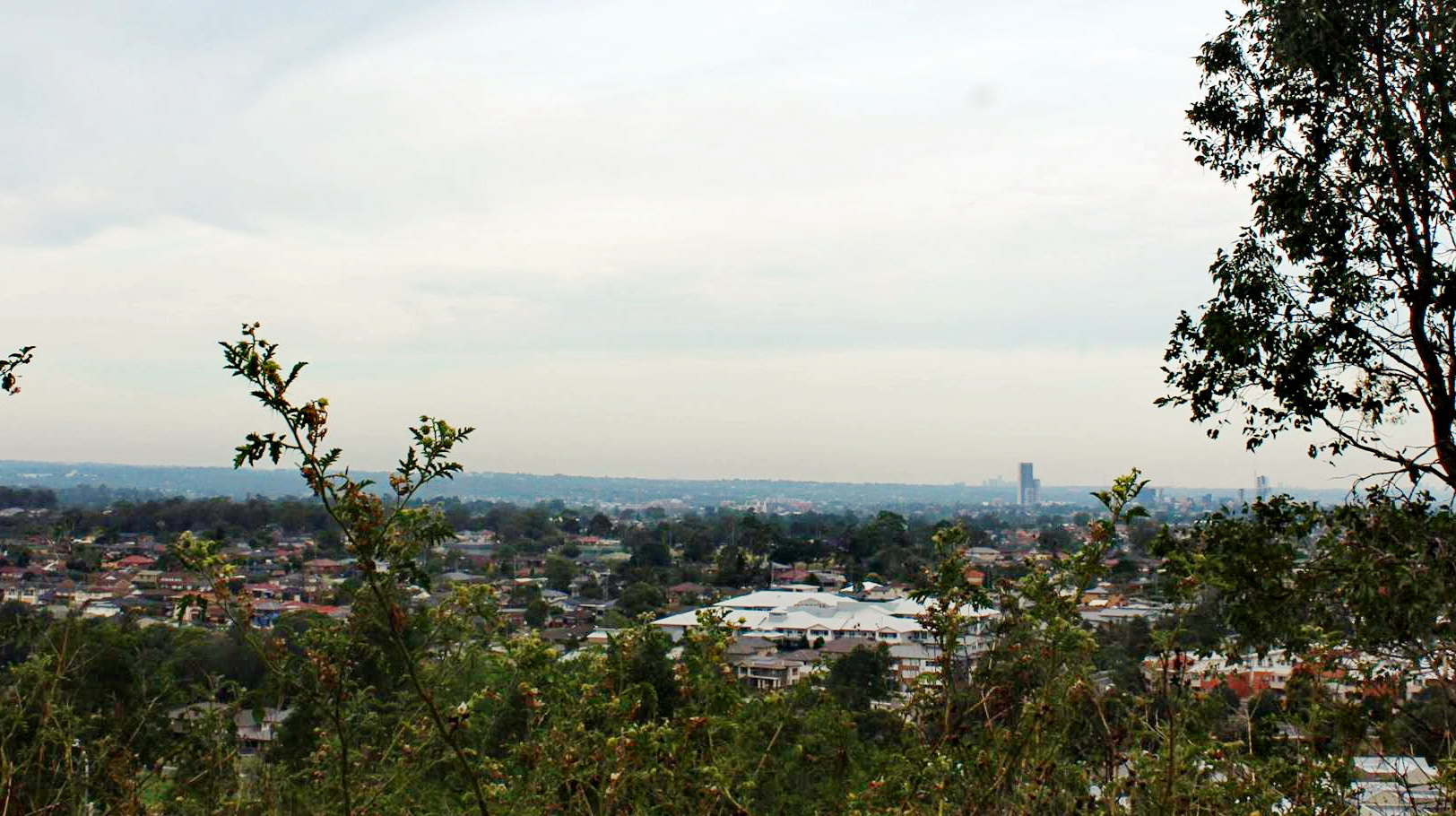
Lookout from Marrong Reserve North, with a view of Parramatta, Chatswood and the Hills District (2017)

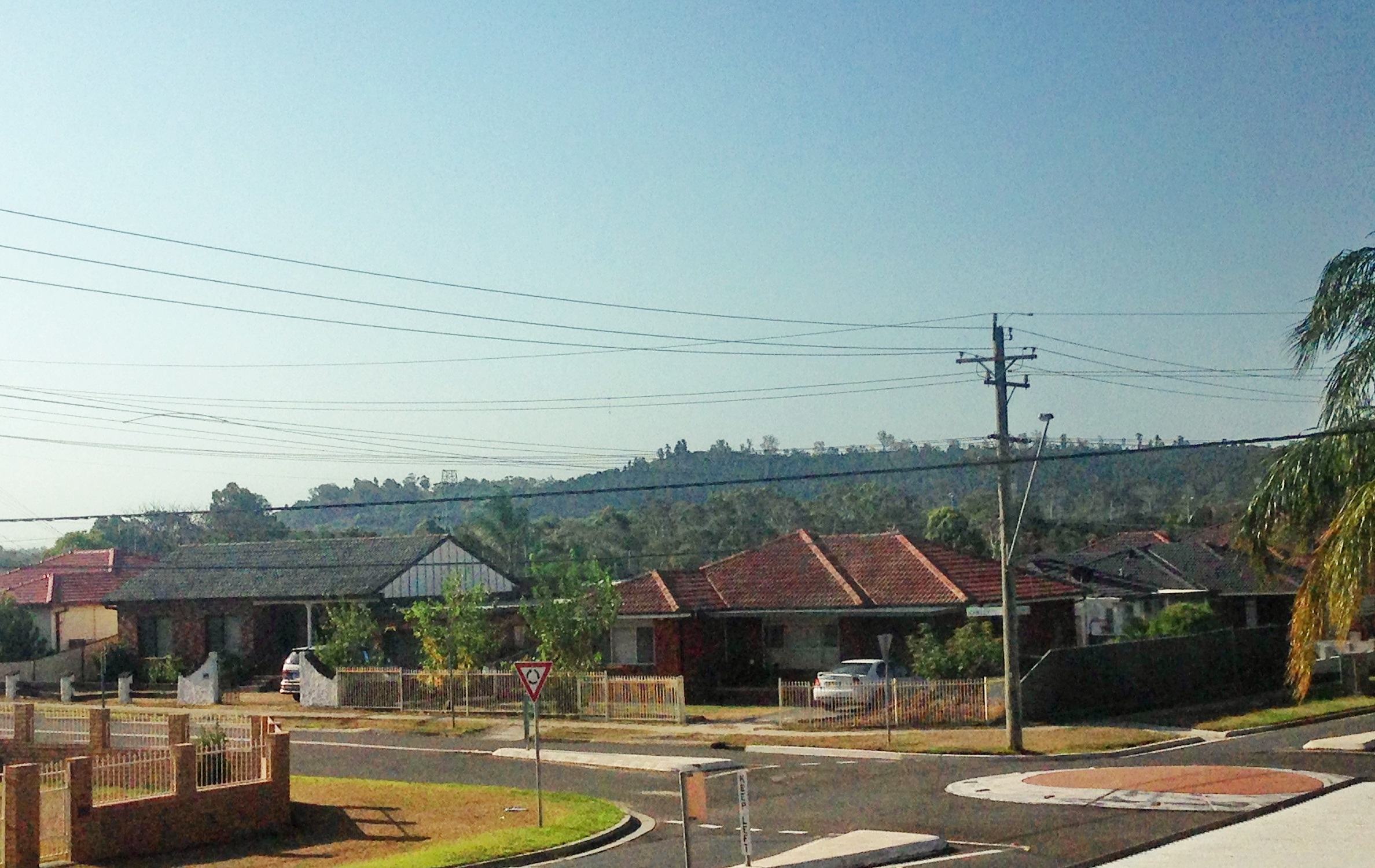
Marrong Reserve South, as viewed from a neighbourhood in Smithfield (2007)

The quarried western part of the ridgeline, with dolerite intrusion on sandstone and shale

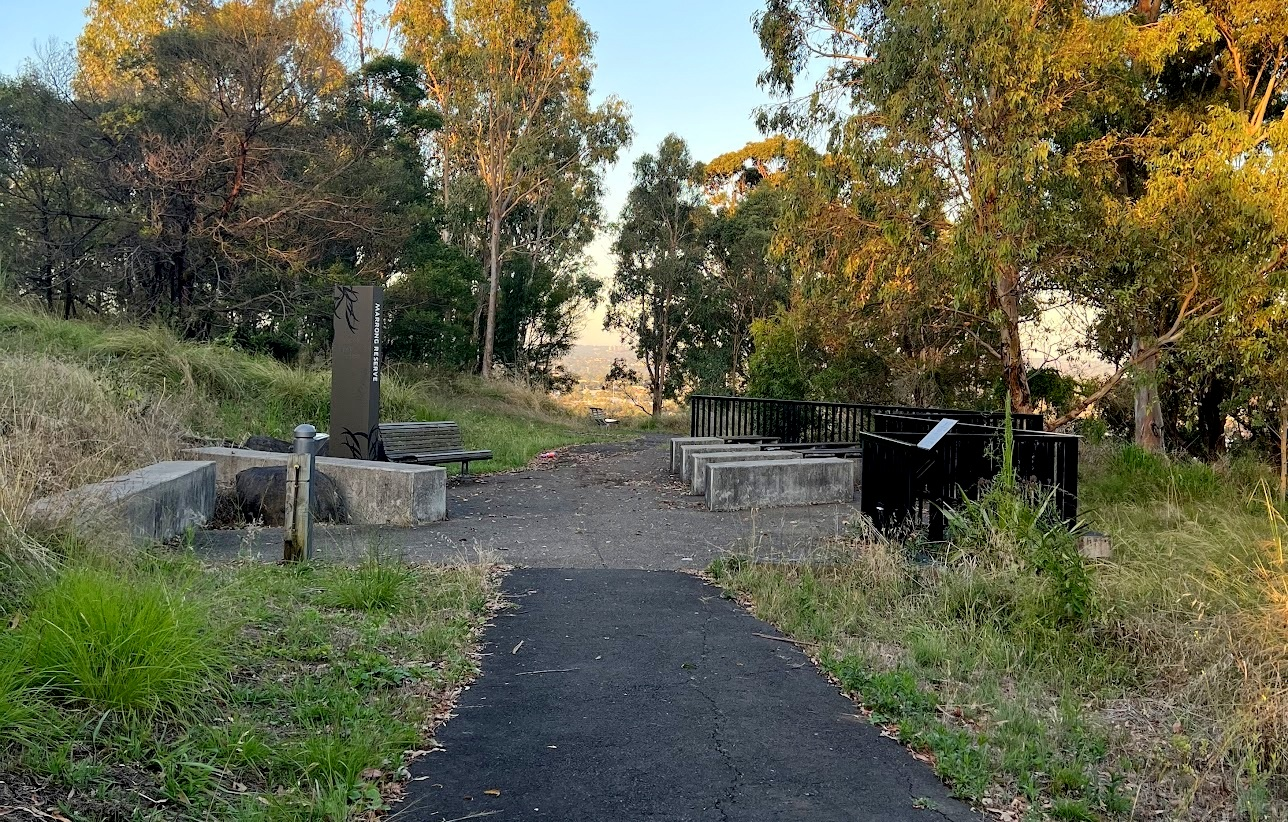
Marrong Reserve North seating area

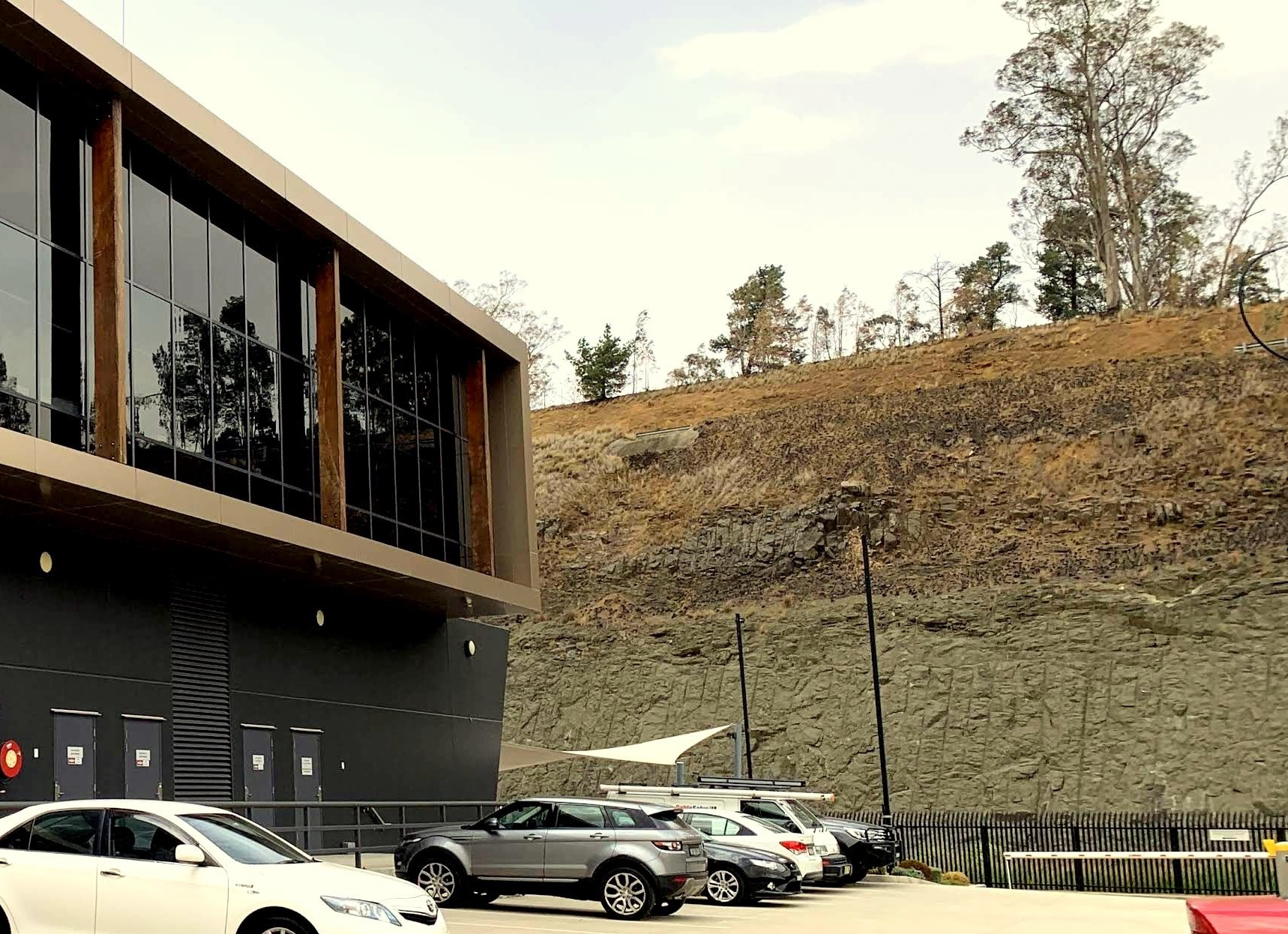
Employment centre at the quarried foot of the reserve

== See also ==
- Grey Box Reserve
- Prospect Nature Reserve
- Prospect dolerite intrusion
- Gipps Road and Hyland Road Regional Parklands

== Bibliography ==
- Lend Lease (2015). Statement of Heritage Impact - Marrong Reserve South, Greystanes Estate, Pemulwuy (Nelsons Ridge Residential Lands).
- Whelans InSites (2010). Statement of Environmental Effects - Mar-Rong Reserve, Pemulwuy - Construction of Landscaping and Public Domain Works, Greystanes Estate, Nelsons Ridge.
