= Toongabbie (disambiguation) =

Toongabbie is a suburb in New South Wales.

Toongabbie may refer to:

- Old Toongabbie, New South Wales
- Toongabbie, Victoria
- Electoral district of Toongabbie
