= Greystanes Creek =

Greystanes Creek Girraween Creek
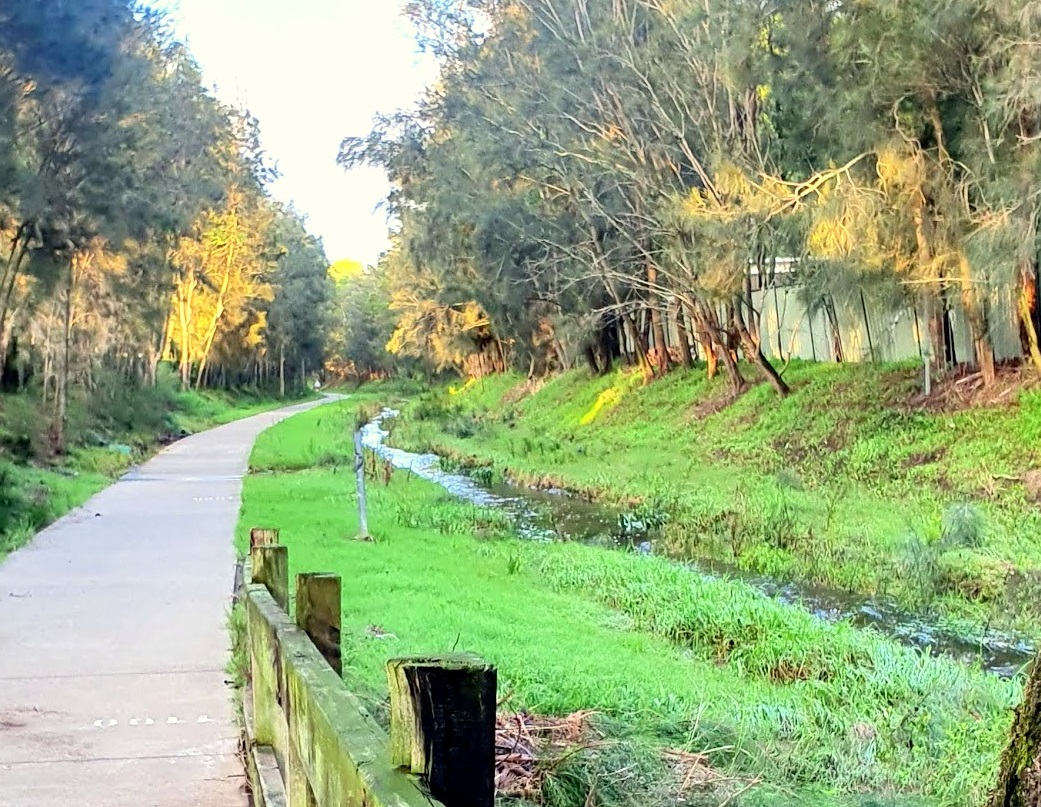
- The creek alongside the riparian forest and a walking trail

Location
- Country: Australia
- State: New South Wales
- Region: Sydney basin (IBRA), Greater Western Sydney
- Local government areas: Cumberland, Parramatta

Physical characteristics
- Source: Pemulwuy Lake
  - location: Pemulwuy
- Mouth: Merges with Pendle Hill Creek and then Toongabbie Creek, forming the Parramatta River to the east
  - location: Toongabbie
  - coordinates: 33°46′54.3″S 150°57′18.6″E
- Length: 5.7 km (3.5 mi)

Basin features
- River system: Parramatta River catchment
- Tributaries
  - right: Pendle Hill Creek

Greystanes Creek, also known as Girraween Creek, is an urban watercourse that is part of the Parramatta River catchment, and is located in Greater Western Sydney, New South Wales, Australia.

Both Greystanes Creek and Pendle Hill Creek are tributaries of Toongabbie Creek which becomes the Parramatta River. The creek lies predominantly in the suburbs of Pemulwuy and Toongabbie. A 1 km (0.62 mi) section of the creek is channelised (concrete-walled) as part of a flood mitigation project.

== Course ==
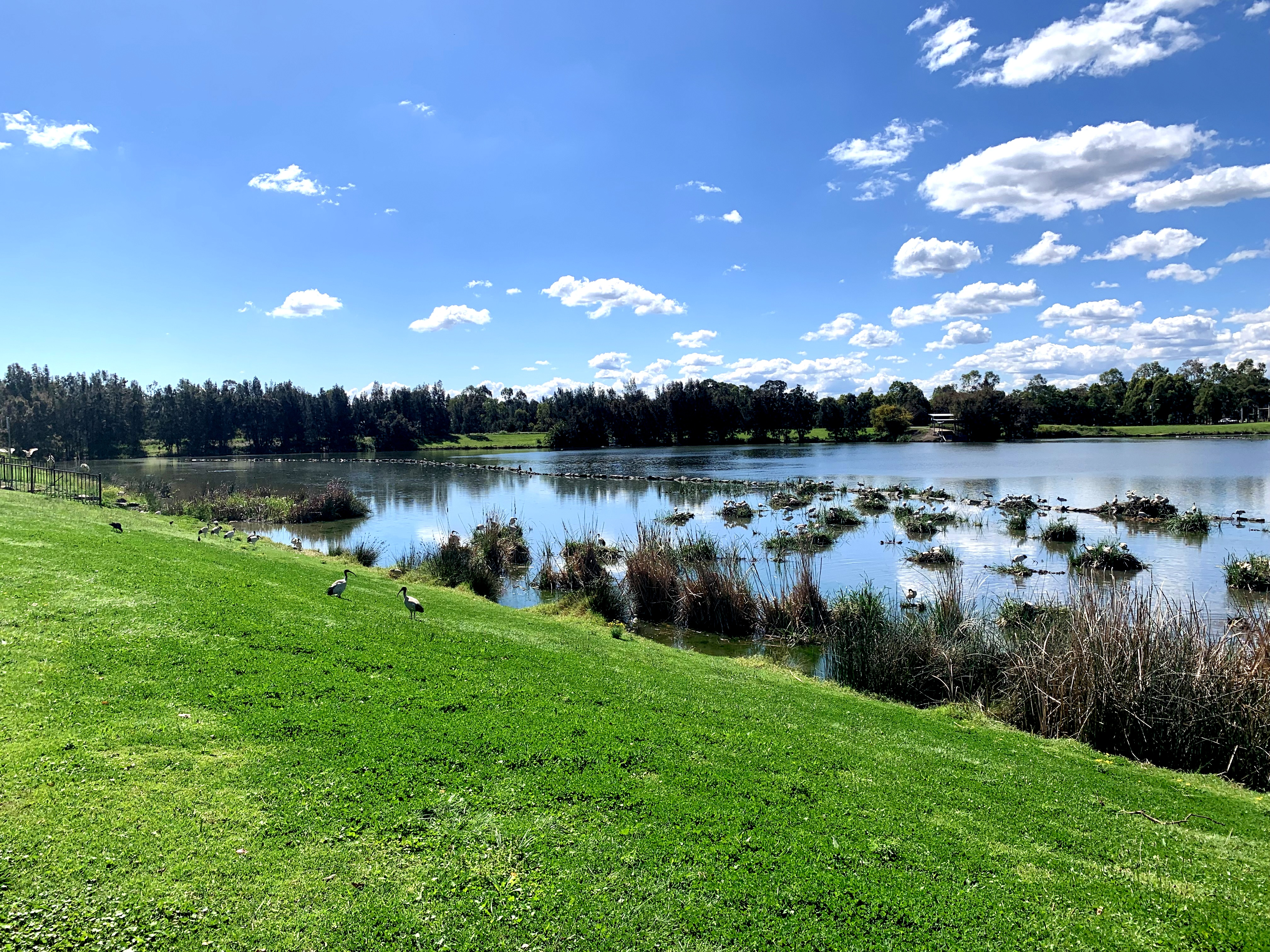
Pemulwuy Lake

The creek's first source lies at Driftway Reserve in Pemulwuy to the south, where it streams north to Pemulwuy Lake, the second source of the creek. From the lake, the creek then heads northeast to Toongabbie, flowing below Great Western Highway and Western Motorway (a small fork of the creek exists here that leads to Prospect Highway and Andrew Campbell Reserve at Prospect Nature Reserve in the west). Going north, the creek passes through the golf course (here it becomes concrete-walled), crossing beneath the North Shore & Western Line and Cumberland Line near Toongabbie railway station. At its mouth, the creek merges with Pendle Creek and then joins Toongabbie Creek (which later becomes Parramatta River to the east).

== Geography ==
The Greystanes Creek catchment area lies within the local government areas of Blacktown and Cumberland, and cover an area of 979 ha (2,420 acres). The creek meets with Pendle Hill Creek around 220 m (720 ft) metres upstream of the confluence of Pendle Hill Creek and Toongabbie Creek. The catchment zones of the creek are usually flat apart from the upper reaches which are defined by undulating hills. The upper limits of the creek are predominantly open space, including land occupied by the CSIRO and the Fox Hills Golf Club.

The area is urbanised north of the golf course, with the creek streaming through a floodplain that is around 100 m (330 ft) in width. A small riparian zone (which is the endangered Coastal Swamp Oak Forest) is present alongside of the creek, though most of the floodplain is a verdant meadow. The creek often floods severely during heavy rainstorms, where it occasionally overflows onto Station Road. Flood risk zones are from Portico Plaza Shopping Centre to Fitzwilliam Road and near Portia Road. Despite its name, the creek does not flow through the suburbs of Greystanes and Girraween. (Note: The area that is now Pemulwuy was once part of the suburb of Greystanes, and the creek was named after that suburb. Though today, a very small portion of the creek does stream through Greystanes – The section between the Western Motorway and Great Western Highway.)

A rehabilitated part of the creek flows between the North Shore & Western Line and Station Road, and it features a rock lined and vegetated channel, with rock riffles placed to offer diverse habitat (to provide habitat for wildlife) and affiliated water quality advantages through flow aeration. Bank protection is provided to safeguard infrastructure and to restrain bank retreat into the adjacent Bowling Club area. Downstream of Station Road, the creek is turned into a concrete channel with grassy berms (and minor vegetation) to the border of the corridor limits. The channel then heads north to the confluence with Toongabbie Creek.

== Recreational areas ==
Parks and reserves along the creek include Wittama Park, Nelson Square, Shadid Reserve, Driftway Reserve (which features the scenic Pemulwuy Lake), Oklahoma Park, John Silverthorne Park, Greystanes Creek Reserve, Toongabbie Road Reserve, Fox Hills Golf Club, Portia Road Reserve, Girraween Park, Jirramba Reserve and She-Oak Reserve.
