= Constitution Hill, New South Wales =

Constitution Hill
- Suburb
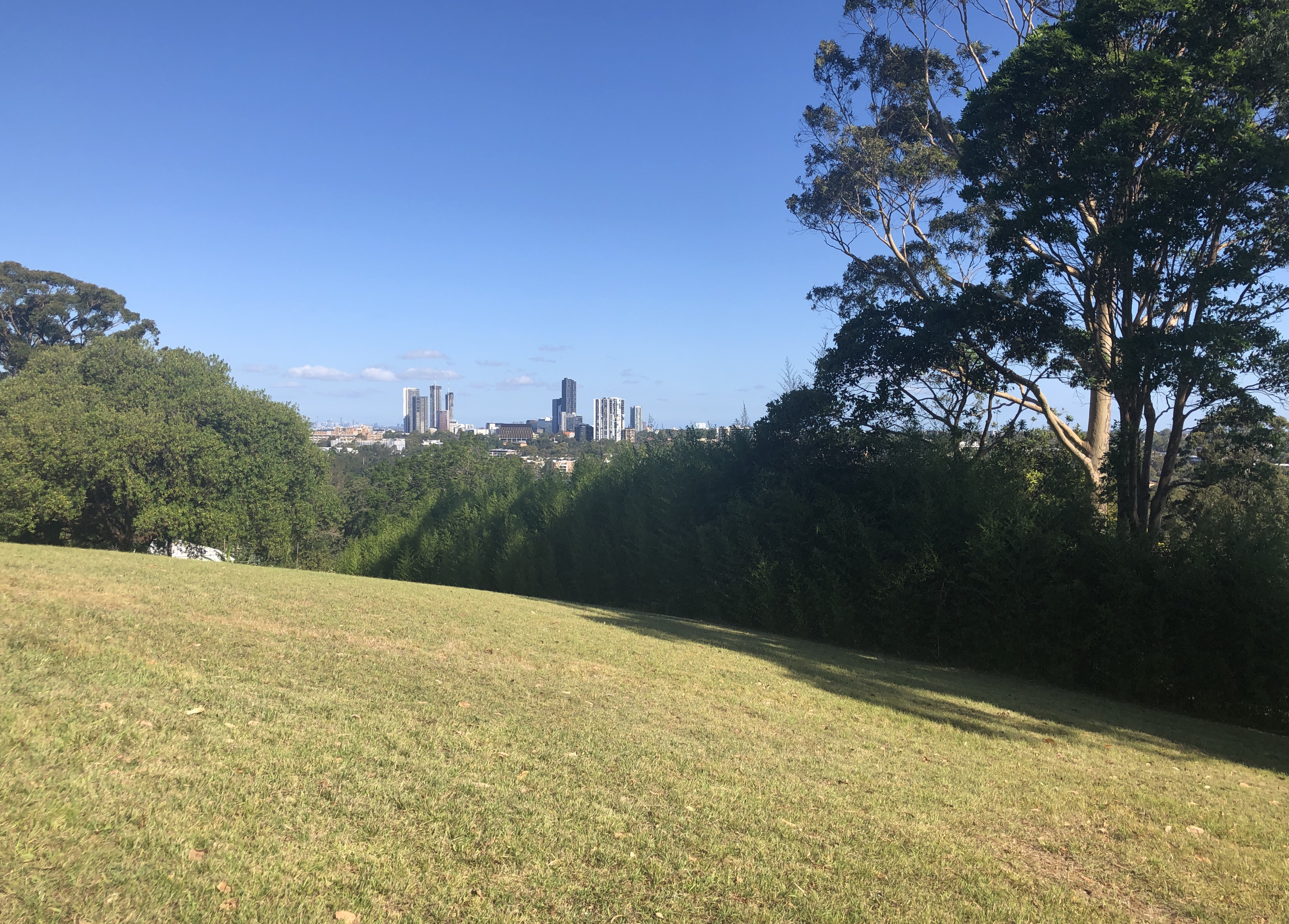
- Mount Dorothy, on the southern boundary of Constitution Hill, was a location involved with the Castle Hill convict rebellion, and features views to Parramatta and Sydney CBD.

- Interactive map of Constitution Hill
- Country: Australia
- State: New South Wales
- City: Sydney
- LGA: City of Parramatta
- Location: 28 km (17 mi) west of Sydney CBD
- Established: 2007

Government
  - State electorate: Winston Hills
  - Federal division: Parramatta
- Elevation: 50 m (160 ft)

Population
  - Total: 4,030 (2021 census)
- Postcode: 2145
Suburbs around Constitution Hill
Old Toongabbie	Winston Hills	Northmead
Old Toongabbie	Constitution Hill	Northmead
Pendle Hill	Wentworthville	Westmead

Constitution Hill is a suburb of Sydney in the state of New South Wales, Australia. Constitution Hill is located on a hill 28 kilometres (17 mi) west of the Sydney central business district in the local government area of the City of Parramatta and is part of the Western Sydney region. Constitution Hill overlooks the city of Parramatta from above and contains views of the inner Sydney city skyline.

== History ==
The area was originally a locality within the suburb of Wentworthville. Constitution Hill was promoted from a locality to a suburb by the Geographical Names Board of New South Wales on 19 January 2007.

There are a few houses built before the suburb's development which remain, although none are heritage listed. Examples include 17A and 53 Fraser Street, which were possibly 2 of the three brick homes built by J.C. Page for local farmer David Johnston's family members, the third house likely being 15 Fitzwilliam Road, Old Toongabbie, which sits on the boundary of Constitution Hill.

== Demographics ==
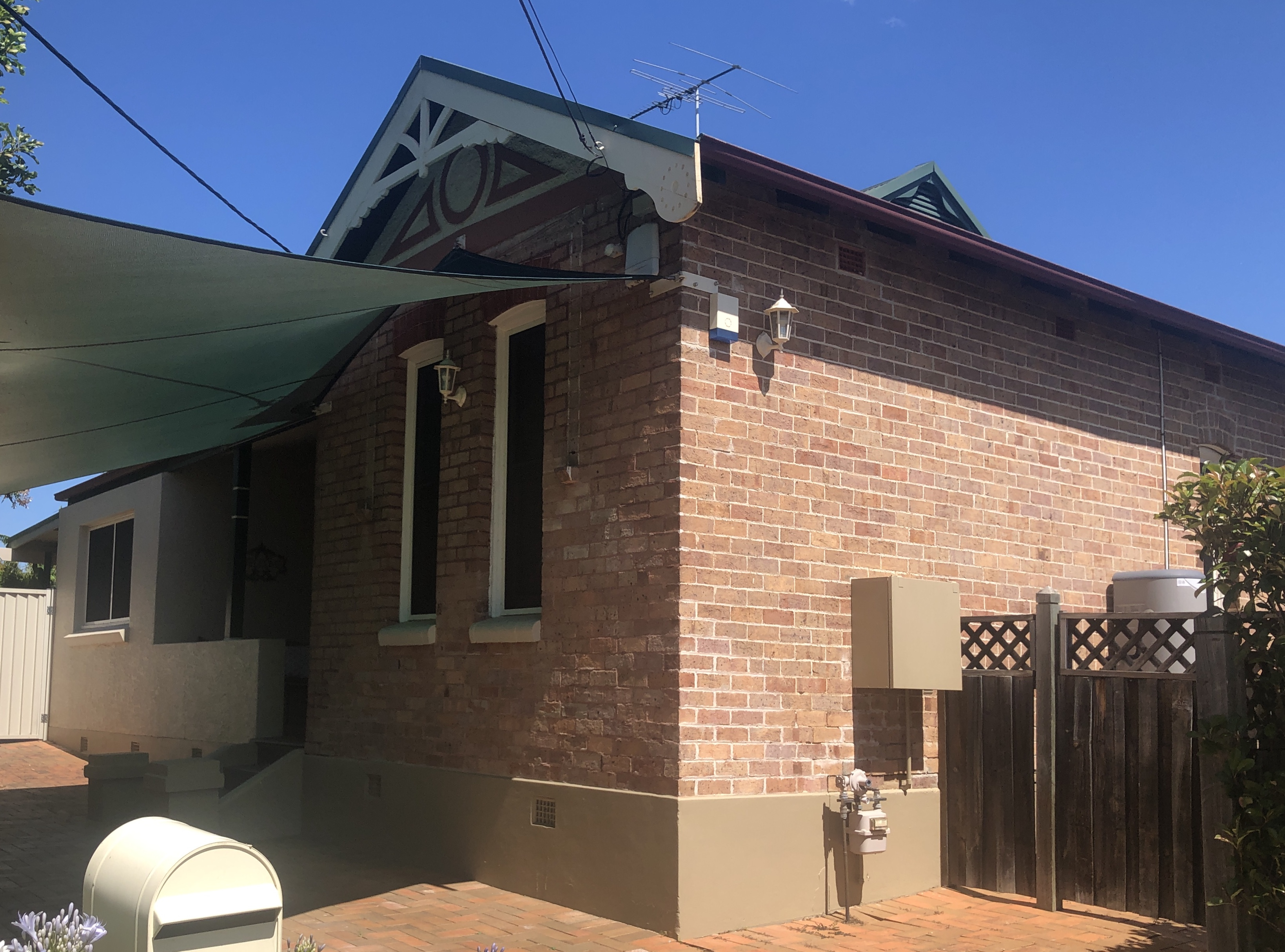
Circa 1907 House at 53 Fraser Street

At the 2021 census, there were 4,030 residents in Constitution Hill. 57.4% of residents were born in Australia. The most common countries of birth were India 4.6%, China 3.7% and Lebanon 3.3%. 53.2% of people only spoke English at home. Other languages spoken at home included Arabic 8.3%, Mandarin 3.5% and Cantonese 2.4%. The most common responses for religion were Catholic 29.5%, No Religion 22.2% and Anglican 8.5%. The median weekly household income was $1,706 which was slightly below the national median of $1,746.

== Historical significance ==
Constitution Hill was one of the places that was involved in the Castle Hill convict rebellion. The mostly Irish convicts would travel from Castle Hill down modern-day Old Windsor Road and meet at Constitution Hill. The distraction they had made at Castle Hill was supposed to stretch out the government forces by allocating some men to go to Castle Hill. The convicts would then attack Parramatta (the capital of the colony at that time) and take over control.

The government officials had suspicion that the convicts were planning an attack on Parramatta and kept most of their forces at Parramatta. Thinking that the convicts were at Toongabbie, they set out west, only to be informed that they were at Constitution Hill. When the government forces arrived at the summit of Constitution Hill (Mount Dorothy), they realised that the men had not made it that far yet and were further west at Rouse Hill. Mount Dorothy is now the site of Caloola Road Reserve, which features multiple plaques commemorating the rebellion.

== Commercial area ==
The only commercial area in the suburb is Constitution Hill Shops, which features 14 shops, a library, park and the adjacent Old Toongabbie Early Childhood Health Centre. It is located near the very centre of the suburb, on the corner of Emma Crescent and Hollis Street, with further access through Bulli Road and Greenleaf Street. One of these shops, a pizza restaurant, was used as the pizza shop in the filming of the Fat Pizza: Back In Business TV series.

== Schools ==
=== Primary Schools ===
Toongabbie East Public School is one of the smallest schools in New South Wales, having just 53 students and 4 teachers in 2015. It is also the only school within the suburb's boundaries.
