= Pemulwuy, New South Wales =

Pemulwuy
- Suburb
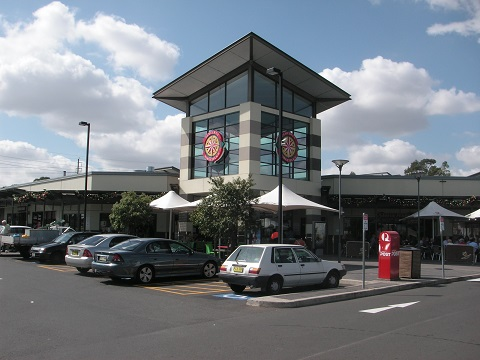
- Pemulwuy Marketplace

- Interactive map of Pemulwuy
- Country: Australia
- State: New South Wales
- City: Greater Western Sydney
- LGA: Cumberland Council
- Location: 30 km (19 mi) west of Sydney CBD

Government
  - State electorate: Prospect
  - Federal division: McMahon
- Elevation: 69 m (226 ft)

Population
  - Total: 5,532 (2021 census)
- Postcode: 2145
Suburbs around Pemulwuy
| Prospect | Prospect | Greystanes |
| Prospect | Pemulwuy | Greystanes |
| Wetherill Park | Wetherill Park | Greystanes |

Pemulwuy is a suburb in Greater Western Sydney, in the state of New South Wales, Australia. Pemulwuy is located 30 kilometres west of the Sydney central business district in the local government area of the Cumberland Council. Pemulwuy is home to the highest point between the Blue Mountains and Sydney, the summit of Prospect Hill.

The quarrying of blue metal, basalt and dolerite was abundant in the area in the past two centuries. Pemulwuy, formerly part of Prospect, is a relatively new suburb, with development beginning in 2004 on the site of a former Boral quarry and CSIRO sites.

== History ==
Pemulwuy is named after the Aboriginal warrior Pemulwuy, who led attacks on the British settlements in the surrounding areas, particularly on the Toongabbie settlement. When Captain-Lieutenant Watkin Tench made another official journey to the west in 1789, he began his journey with reference to Prospect Hill, which commanded a view of the great chain of mountains to the west. The first recorded ascent of Prospect Hill by a colonist is that of Tench and his party on 26 June 1789.

In 1791 Governor Arthur Phillip started granting plots of land (mostly 12 to 28 hectares (30 to 70 acres)) to emancipated convicts in what is now Pemulwuy. Thirteen grants of land in the region were made in July 1791. In 1799 Ensign William Cummings of the New South Wales Corps was granted 30 hectares (75 acres) at Prospect Hill. From its commencement in 1791 with the early settlement of the area, agricultural use of the land continued. Much of the land appears to have been cleared by the 1820s and pastoral use of the land was well established by then. When Governor Macquarie paid a visit to the area in 1810, he was favourably impressed by the comfortable conditions that had been created.

On 1 May 1801 Governor King took drastic action, issuing a public order requiring that Aboriginal people around Parramatta, Prospect Hill and Georges River should be "driven back from the settlers" habitations by firing at them'. In 1808 William Lawson was granted 220 hectares (550 acres) on the western slopes of the west ridge where he was to build his home Veteran Hall. He then bought Cummings' grant and it was here that his third son, Nelson Lawson built a magnificent home, Grey Stanes, on the crown of Prospect Hill. Prompted by suggestions to the Reverend Samuel Marsden by local Prospect Aboriginal groups that a conference should take place "with a view of opening the way to reconciliation", Marsden promptly organised a meeting near Prospect Hill on 3 May 1805. The conference led to the end of the conflict for the Aboriginal clans around Parramatta and Prospect.

=== Prospect quarry ===
The Prospect quarry gap in 2009.

Quarrying in the area began in the 1820s and naturalist Charles Darwin visited the region in January 1836, to observe the geology. By the latter part of the nineteenth century coarse-grained picrite, and other doloritic rock types were being extracted from William Lawson's estate on the west and north sides of the Hill. By the early twentieth century, the land had been acquired by quarrying firms anxious to expand their land holdings near this valuable source of raw material. The bulk of the present CSIRO site was acquired by the Commonwealth in 1946, and a further 15 hectares was acquired in 1963. In the early 1950s the site became operational and sheep were pastured for research purposes. Prospect Hill was for many years the primary source of road stone for the city's expanding infrastructure until the reserves of dolerite were exhausted.

Quarrying companies gradually took over more and more of Prospect Hill, mining the dolerite for use as roadstone until it was almost all gone and much of the hill with it. The Prospect quarry is formed by an intrusion of dolerite rock into Ashfield Shale. At least seven different rock types occur in the intrusion. The material is predominantly coarse-grained picrite with olivine-dolerite and dolerite. Roads were paved with grey dolerite from Prospect Hill as early as the 1820s. By the end of World War II, the quarries closed down except for two that had the best class of basalt.

=== Land development ===
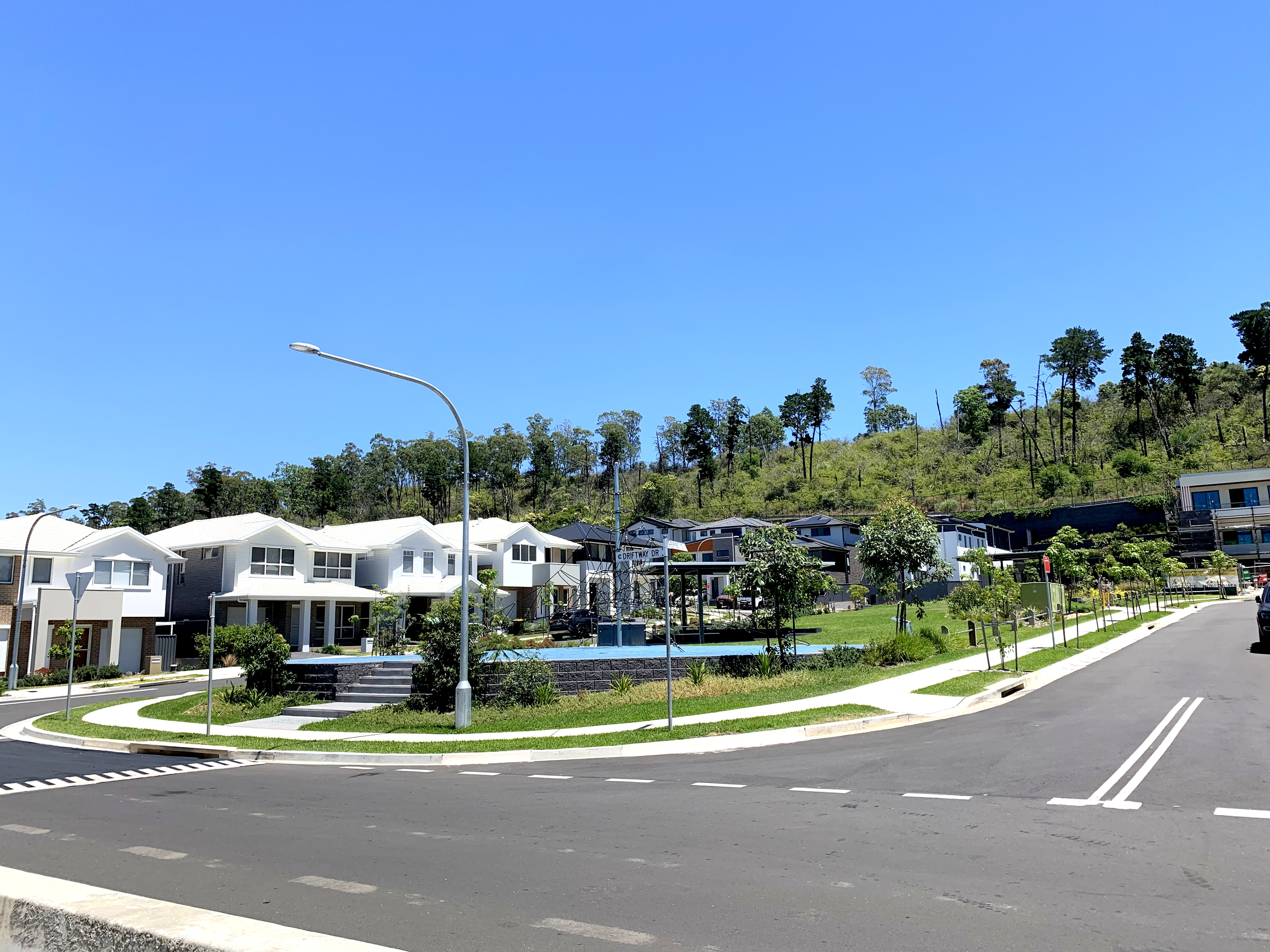
The southern residential zone at Driftway Drive

As at 19 February 2001, the southern portion of the land, located within the Boral Brickworks site, has been extensively quarried; however the CSIRO site has largely retained its original surface form. In 2002 Delfin Lend Lease entered a joint venture with Boral to develop the residential lands. On 30 January 2004 the eastern part of Prospect, which includes the quarry gap, became a new suburb called Pemulwuy containing the new housing estates of Lakeside and Nelson's Ridge and the industrial area within the oval-shaped ridge of Prospect Hill. Nelson's Ridge is being developed by Lend Lease in two stages with the first comprising the northern employment and northern residential lands and the second comprising the southern equivalents. This site will eventually be integrated with the Nelson's Ridge development through Driftway Drive as well as cycleways and pedestrian links being established between the two.

Quarrying last occurred in 2007. Subsequently, the land inside the oval-shaped ridge was levelled from 2008 to 2010. The gap in the ridge that had previously been created by quarrying has been lowered to the floor level of the quarry and the drainage of the area reversed from its earlier northward flow to empty into Prospect Creek, while a new road, Reconciliation Road, has been driven through the centre of the hill and across the gap to Wetherill Park.

In the early 2010s, the 330ha quarry gap was transformed into light industry area with several warehouse distribution centres being established by 2015. Prospect Highway now winds through the gap. The Northern Residential lands have been established since the early 2010s. In 2021, construction began on the Southern Residential lands on the woody Marrong Reserve South, and was completed by late 2024.

== Geography ==
Igneous rock intrusion at Prospect quarry, now an industry site.

Philip Gidley King mentions that the landscape of Prospect is "a very pleasant tract of country, which, from the distance the trees grew from each other, and the gentle hills and dales, and rising slopes covered with grass, appeared like a vast park. The soil from Rose Hill to Prospect-Hill is nearly alike, being a loam and clay." The tree cover was mainly the eucalypts, grey box and forest red gum. Spotted gum (Corymbia maculata) is also known to have occurred in the Prospect area.

Prospect Hill, which lies in the suburb, is Sydney's largest body of igneous rock and rises to a height of 117 metres above sea level. The Early Jurassic activity resulted in the shaping of the Prospect dolerite intrusion, which unequivocally points that the hill had a volcanic origin. The eroded residue of the volcanic core forms Prospect Hill, which was battered down over millions of years to a small bulge, which is a laccolith, in the generally flat lands of western Sydney. Greystanes Creek, which is part of the Parramatta River catchment, flows into the suburb and Pemulwuy Lake is one of its main sources.

The eastern portion consists in the most part of high density town-house like development, while the western area consists of very large warehouse and distribution facilities. The southern zone of the suburb is promoted by property developers Lendlease as "Nelson's Ridge" named after Nelson Simmons Lawson, son of William Lawson, the owner of the Grey Stanes Estate. The northern zone of the suburb is promoted by Stockland as "Lakewood".

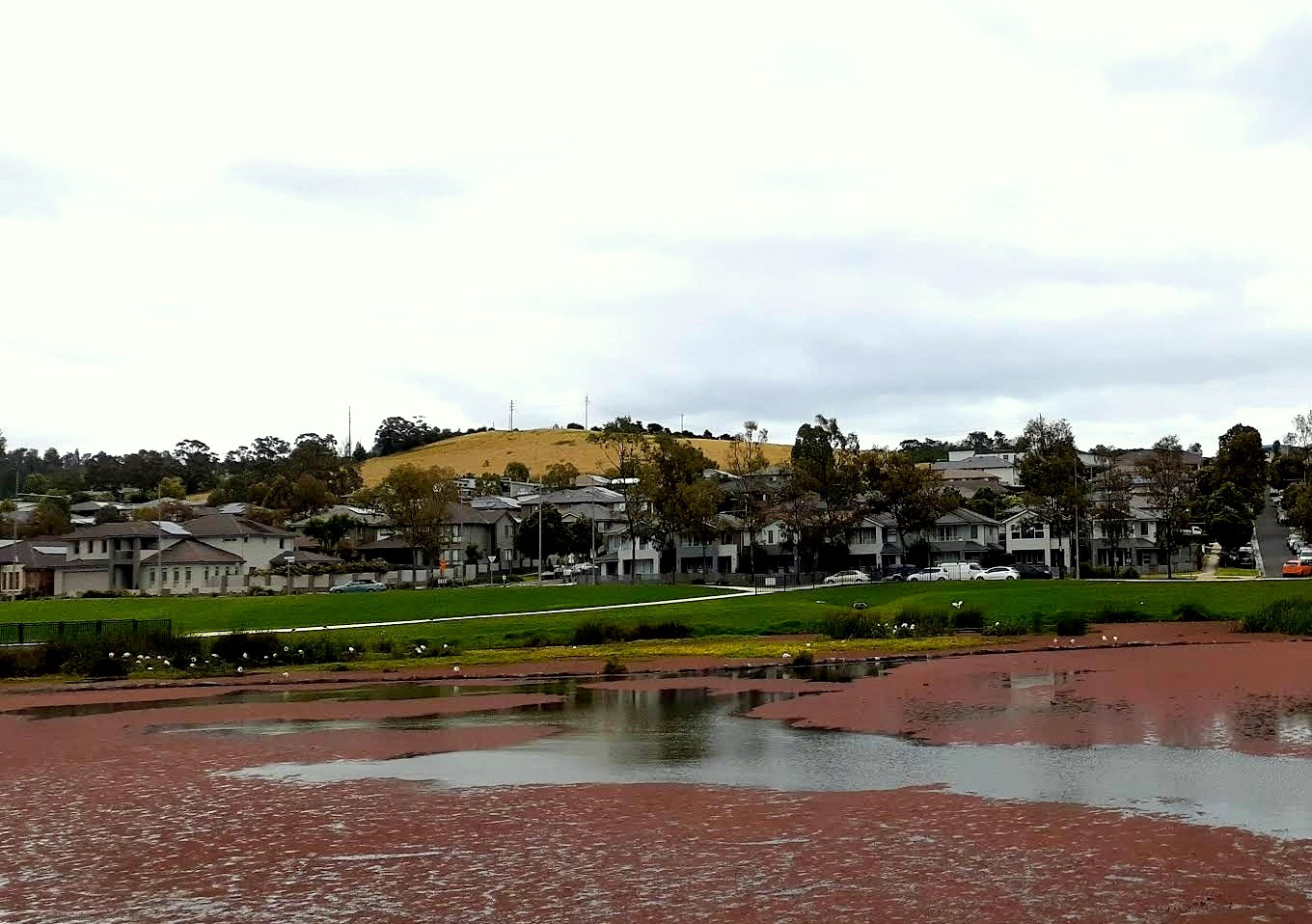
View of Prospect Hill from Pemulwuy Lake (Driftway Reserve)

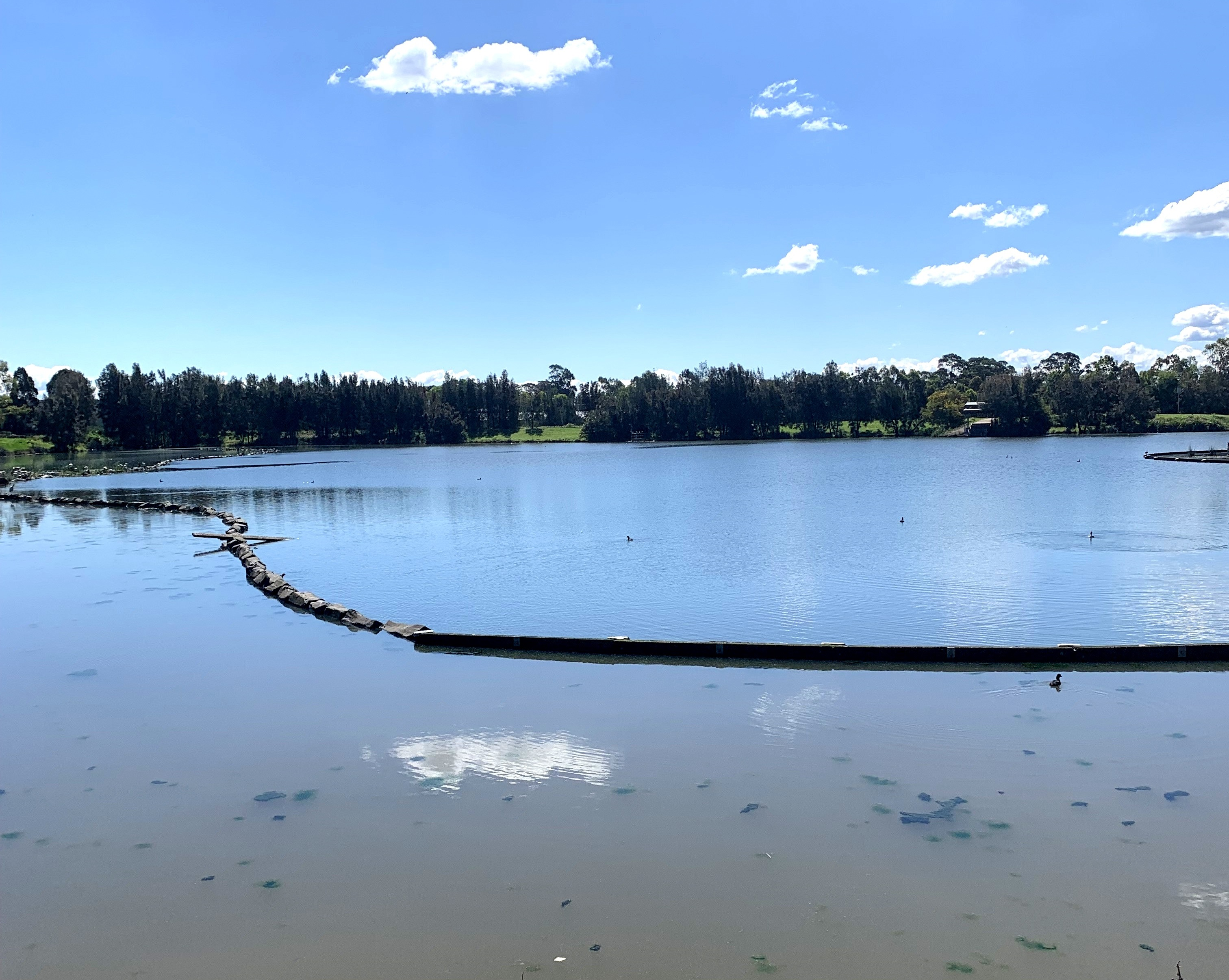
Pemulwuy Lake at Driftway Reserve

Street names in the suburb include Watkin Tench Parade, named after Captain Watkin Tench, who was the first European to record an ascent of Prospect Hill in 1789.

=== Climate ===
The area features a humid subtropical climate (Köppen climate classification: Cfa) with warm to hot summers and mild to cool winters with sporadic rainfall throughout the year. It is usually a few degrees warmer than Sydney CBD on summer days and a few degrees cooler on winter nights. There could be a temperature differential of 5–10 °C (9–18 °F) in summer due to sea breezes in the coast that do not generally penetrate inland. The suburb receives less annual rain than Sydney CBD by about 300 mm (11.81 in). Late winter and early spring receive the least rainfall, whilst late summer and autumn receive more rain.

Climate data for Prospect Reservoir 1991–2020 averages, 1887–present extremes
| Month | Jan | Feb | Mar | Apr | May | Jun | Jul | Aug | Sep | Oct | Nov | Dec | Year |
|---|---|---|---|---|---|---|---|---|---|---|---|---|---|
| Record high °C (°F) | 47.0 (116.6) | 46.4 (115.5) | 39.5 (103.1) | 37.1 (98.8) | 29.4 (84.9) | 25.6 (78.1) | 26.5 (79.7) | 29.4 (84.9) | 35.0 (95.0) | 39.0 (102.2) | 42.0 (107.6) | 44.4 (111.9) | 47.0 (116.6) |
| Mean daily maximum °C (°F) | 29.3 (84.7) | 28.6 (83.5) | 26.8 (80.2) | 24.1 (75.4) | 20.7 (69.3) | 17.7 (63.9) | 17.2 (63.0) | 19.3 (66.7) | 22.4 (72.3) | 24.8 (76.6) | 26.1 (79.0) | 28.0 (82.4) | 23.8 (74.8) |
| Mean daily minimum °C (°F) | 18.0 (64.4) | 18.0 (64.4) | 16.2 (61.2) | 12.9 (55.2) | 9.7 (49.5) | 6.1 (43.0) | 6.6 (43.9) | 6.6 (43.9) | 9.5 (49.1) | 12.1 (53.8) | 14.5 (58.1) | 16.4 (61.5) | 12.3 (54.1) |
| Record low °C (°F) | 10.0 (50.0) | 10.8 (51.4) | 7.9 (46.2) | 3.6 (38.5) | 1.2 (34.2) | −0.8 (30.6) | −0.6 (30.9) | −0.5 (31.1) | 1.7 (35.1) | 4.5 (40.1) | 6.8 (44.2) | 7.8 (46.0) | −0.8 (30.6) |
| Average precipitation mm (inches) | 96.4 (3.80) | 126.9 (5.00) | 97.4 (3.83) | 67.4 (2.65) | 49.5 (1.95) | 76.1 (3.00) | 40.7 (1.60) | 39.7 (1.56) | 42.2 (1.66) | 55.3 (2.18) | 77.1 (3.04) | 75.5 (2.97) | 845.0 (33.27) |
| Average precipitation days (≥ 1mm) | 8.3 | 8.7 | 9.2 | 6.5 | 5.3 | 7.0 | 5.6 | 4.2 | 5.1 | 6.6 | 8.2 | 8.2 | 82.9 |
| Average afternoon relative humidity (%) | 52 | 54 | 55 | 50 | 57 | 54 | 52 | 43 | 45 | 44 | 51 | 51 | 51 |
Source 1: Prospect Reservoir (1991–2020 averages)
Source 2: Prospect Reservoir (1965–2018 extremes) Horsley Park (1997–present extremes)

== Demographics ==
- According to the 2021 Census:
  - The most common ancestries were Australian 15.5%, Indian 12.5%, English 11.8%, Chinese 8.0% and Filipino 6.8%.
  - 48.8% of people only spoke English at home. Other languages spoken at home included Arabic 4.9%, Hindi 4.7%, Gujarati 3.4%, Tamil 3.0% and Mandarin 2.6%.
  - 55.6% of people were born in Australia. The most common countries of overseas birth were India 8.0%, Philippines 4.1%, Fiji 3.0%, Sri Lanka 2.2% and China 2.2%.
  - The most common responses for religion were Catholic 33.8%, No Religion 14.3%, Hinduism 13.9%, Islam 9.6% and Not Stated 5.7%.

== Commercial area ==
The Pemulwuy Marketplace is located on the intersection of Greystanes Road and Butu Wargun Drive along with a community centre and child care centre. Ornamented by lomandras and eucalyptus trees, the marketplace features a Woolworths and a BWS outlet. Another shopping centre, called Nelsons Ridge Plaza, is located on Watkin Tench Parade.

== Politics ==
Pemulwuy political information at a federal, state and local council level as of 2024.

| Level | Federal | State | Local Government Area |
|---|---|---|---|
| Jurisdiction | Australia | NSW | Cumberland City Council |
| Electoral Boundary | McMahon | Prospect | Greystanes Ward |
| Representatives | Chris Bowen (Labor) | Hugh McDermott (Labor) | Diane Colman (Labor), Eddy Sarkis (IND), Nadima Kafrouni-Saba (Liberal) |

== Parks and reserves ==
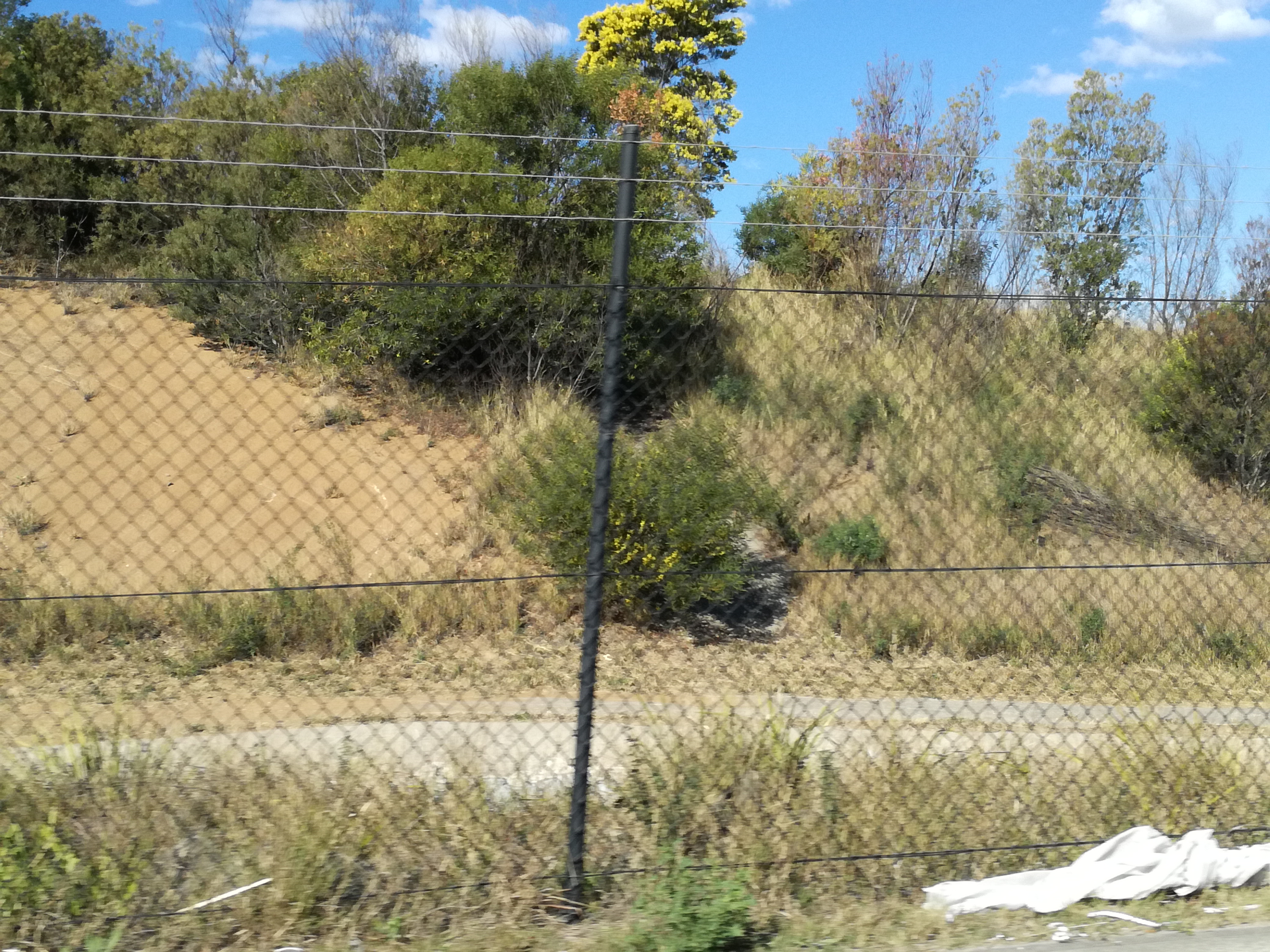
The flora of the quarry on Prospect Highway.

The suburb is home to many parks and reserves such as:

- Grey Box Reserve
- Dirrabari Reserve (including dog park and tennis courts)
- Driftway Reserve
- Andrew Campbell Reserve
- Marrong Reserve (highest point of the suburb featuring a lookout, native plants and public seating, although currently accessible only by foot or bicycle, due to road closures.)
- Prospect Hill
- Wittama Park
- Shadid Reserve
- Naying Drive Park
- Nelson Square

== Transport ==
The area is served by the Transit Systems 809 bus services from Merrylands, 810x, and 811x bus services from Parramatta and 800 and 812 bus service from Blacktown to Fairfield. The barriers on Butu Wargun Drive mean that those living in the eastern portion, and working in the western must either walk or cycle over the ridge, or drive via the Great Western Highway to the north of the suburb, and Reconciliation Road.

Pemulwuy is a 5-minute drive to the M4 and 10-minute drive to Parramatta. Merrylands railway station and Pendle Hill railway station are only a few minutes drive away.
