= Girraween, New South Wales =

Girraween
- Suburb
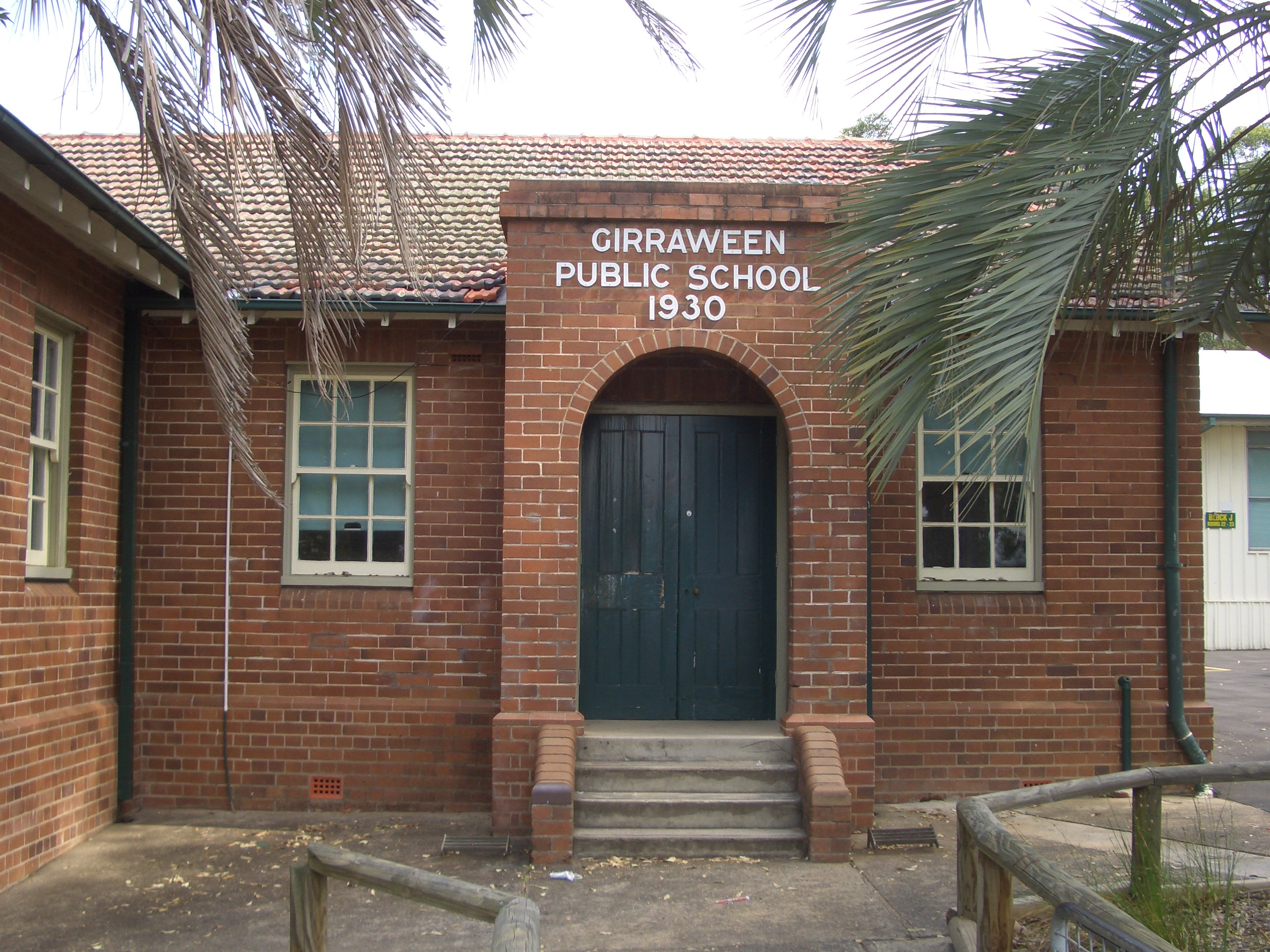
- Girraween Public School

- Interactive map of Girraween
- Coordinates: 33°48′05″S 150°56′35″E
- Country: Australia
- State: New South Wales
- Region: Western Sydney
- City: Sydney
- LGA: Cumberland Council
- Location: 30 km (19 mi) west of Sydney CBD

Government
  - State electorate: Prospect
  - Federal division: Parramatta
- Elevation: 45 m (148 ft)

Population
  - Total: 6,256 (2021 census)
- Postcode: 2145
Suburbs around Girraween
Toongabbie	Toongabbie	Toongabbie
Toongabbie	Girraween	Pendle Hill
Pemulwuy	Greystanes	Greystanes

Girraween is a suburb of Sydney, in the state of New South Wales, Australia. Girraween is located 30 km west of the Sydney central business district, in the local government area of Cumberland Council and is part of the Greater Western Sydney region.

== History ==
Girraween is an Aboriginal word meaning place of flowers. It was first inhabited by the Darug people. This area was part of the estate of D'Arcy Wentworth, who was honoured in the naming of the nearby suburb of Wentworthville.

== Demographics ==
At the 2021 census in Girraween, there were 6,256 people. Just over a third (34.2%) of people were born in Australia, with the top other countries of birth being India 34.9%, Sri Lanka 9.9%, Malta 2.0%, China 1.9% and New Zealand 1.1%. In Girraween, 75.9% of people spoke a language other than English at home. The other most common languages spoken were Tamil 20.6%, Gujarati 10.0%, Telugu 7.4%, Hindi 7.4% and Malayalam 3.3%. The top responses for religious affiliation were Hinduism 52.4%, Catholic 14.7% and No Religion 7.5%.

== Transport ==
Girraween is serviced by the 705 bus route from Blacktown to Parramatta. There is no railway station although it is a short walk through Civic Park, to Pendle Hill Railway Station. Toongabbie Railway Station is also easily accessible by walk or car.

== Schools ==
- Girraween High School (Selective high school)
- Girraween Public School
- St Anthony's Girraween (Catholic school)

== Sport and recreation ==
- Girraween Eagles and Girraween Park.
- Civic Park, just over the eastern border in Pendle Hill has a basketball court, a netball court, tennis courts, barbecue areas and a playground area.
- Girraween Little Athletics Club is based at CV Kelly Park.
