= Girraween High School =

Location
- Girraween, western Sydney, New South Wales; Australia; 33°47′59″S 150°56′41″E

Information
- Type: Government-funded co-educational academically selective secondary day school
- Motto: Latin: Mens Conscia Recti (Mind aware of right)
- Established: 1976; 50 years ago
- Sister school: Hisai High School, Mie, Japan
- Educational authority: New South Wales Department of Education
- Principal: L Crangle
- Years: 7–12
- Enrolment: c. 760 (2020)
- Campus: Suburban
- Colours: Black, gold and white
- Website: girraween-h.schools.nsw.gov.au

Girraween High School is a government-funded co-educational academically selective secondary day school, located in Girraween, in the western suburbs of Sydney, New South Wales, Australia. Established in 1976 and operated by the New South Wales Department of Education, the school caters for approximately 760 students from Year 7 to Year 12.

== History ==
Girraween High School was first opened in 1976, with an enrolment of 300 students and 20 staff. Its inaugural Principal was Colin Bowser and the Deputy Principal Harry Earp. Shortly after the school's opening, an agricultural plot was established, staffed by a part-time farm hand. That same year, with the assistance of Science Teacher Fred Flanagan, a camera club was formed. Given that the medium was not at that time part of the art curriculum, the darkrooms were installed within the Science Department. In 1980, the Camera Club's collaboration with students interested in journalism led to the publishing of the school's first yearbook.

In 1978, the school applied for a grant to build a number of buildings to represent a pioneer Australian town. Despite not receiving the funding, under the guidance of Industrial Arts teacher John Lawson, the school erected a colonial cottage that was relocated from Blacktown. The building was the first of several, including a railway station, and constituted what was to become "Davey Village". The structures were burnt down a decade later with the school maintaining the remains in what is now part of the expanded agriculture plot.

Through the years of 1977 to 1983, Gus the Goat served as the school's official mascot. On his death in 1983, the school newspaper was dedicated to him, although now the newsletter is called Etcetera.

In 1989, Girraween High became an academically selective school. Under principal Robert Cruikshank, specialist computer rooms and music studios were constructed, and a sister school relationship with Hisai High school in Mie, Japan was forged.

At Presentation Day on 15 December 2008, former Premier Nathan Rees promised that a school hall would be added to the state's Capital Works program. In September 2009 a $400,000 grant was announced to extend the school gym and construct a stage.

In 2014, Girraween High School achieved exceptional results in the HSC Examinations and was subsequently placed 15th statewide amongst all high schools. In 2015, Girraween High School ranked 8th statewide.

In 2018, there were several upgrades made to the school such as new roofing and upgraded toilets. Further major improvements made to the school included upgrades to the Senior Lawn and Study. The development of modern quality learning environments included the addition of shade cloths, outdoor sandstone learning areas and an outdoor performance amphitheater.

== Organizations ==
The school has four school organizations which provide support to the school:

- P & C Association – Girraween High School Parents & Citizen' Association takes an active interest in the welfare and education of students. When possible, they have a guest speaker.
- Prefects
- Student Representative Council (SRC) – 4 representatives are chosen by the cohort to represent them at meetings. The SRC sets up many fundraisers. Some annual events include Halloween activities and Valentine's Day activities.

== Curriculum ==
Students take the Higher School Certificate (HSC). Since 2012, students do not take the School Certificate.

== Admissions and enrolment ==
Total enrolment – per year group – in junior years (7–10) is approximately 120 students, and around 140 in senior years (11–12). As a selective school, entry into the school in Year 7 is based upon results in a statewide examination known as the Selective High Schools Test. As of 2015, students must achieve a score of at least 235 in this examination to be accepted at the school. Entry into vacant places in later stages is based on a reserve list, an exam and at times other criteria - mainly reports and academic achievements from previous years.

== Sport ==
The school has a large gymnasium which contains one small basketball court or one volleyball court. The school also has two full-sized sporting fields, as well as two outdoor basketball courts with a shelter. There is also a room with a few gym equipment, such as plyo boxes and a rowing machine.

Girraween High School participates in the Quad Schools Tournament with Penrith High School, Baulkham Hills High School and James Ruse Agriculture High School.

=== Sport houses ===
Girraween High School has four houses named after Australian sporting personalities:

- Fraser (Dawn Fraser, swimmer)
- Chappell (Ian Chappell, cricketer)
- McKay (Heather McKay, squash player)
- Newcombe (John Newcombe, tennis player)

== Notable alumni ==
- David R. Brown – research neuroscientist
- Nicole da Silva – television actress
- Jana Pittman – dual Olympic athlete
- Daniel Mookhey – Treasurer of NSW, 2023 to present
- Elizabeth Lee – ACT Opposition Leader
- Nicholas Brown – actor

== See also ==
- List of Government schools in New South Wales
- List of selective high schools in New South Wales
