= Old Toongabbie =

- Suburb
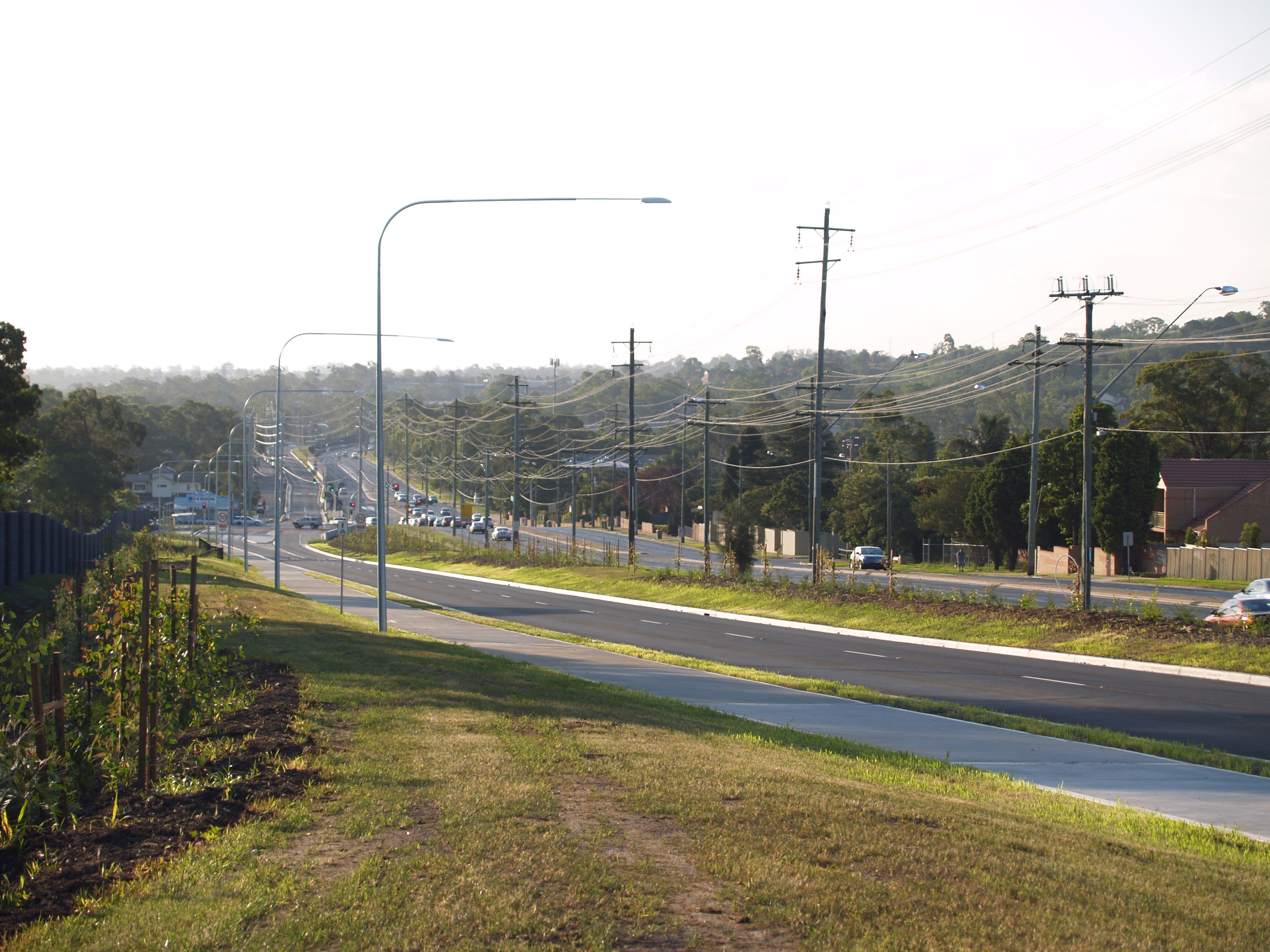
- North-West T-way Old Windsor Rd at Old Toongabbie

- Interactive map of Old Toongabbie
- Country: Australia
- State: New South Wales
- Region: Greater Western Sydney
- City: Greater Western Sydney
- LGA: City of Parramatta
- Location: 29 km (18 mi) west of Sydney CBD
- Established: 1792

Government
  - State electorate: Winston Hills
  - Federal divisions: Mitchell; Parramatta
- Elevation: 37 m (121 ft)

Population
  - Total: 3,276 (2021 census)
- Postcode: 2146
Suburbs around Old Toongabbie
| Seven Hills | Winston Hills | Winston Hills |
| Toongabbie | Old Toongabbie | Constitution Hill |
| Pendle Hill | Wentworthville | Wentworthville |

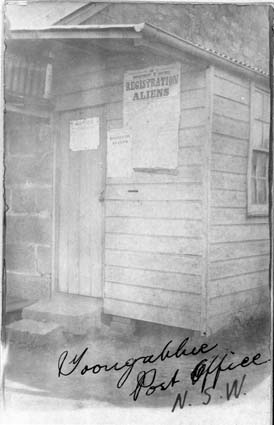
Old Toongabbie Post Office 1901

Old Toongabbie is a suburb of Greater Western Sydney, in the state of New South Wales, Australia 29 kilometres west of the Sydney central business district in the local government area of the City of Parramatta.

Old Toongabbie is noted for being the third post colonisation settlement, chosen for its location on a main waterway.

== Origin of the Suburb Name ==
Toongabbie is derived from an Aboriginal word, reported as meaning place by the water or meeting by the water. It was named in June 1792 after Governor Arthur Phillip asked the local Aboriginal people what they called the place. It is the oldest official use of an Aboriginal place-name – Parramatta (the Aboriginal place name) was founded earlier was first called Rose Hill.

“Old Toongabbie” became the name of the location of the original town (located next to Toongabbie Creek) as opposed to “Toongabbie” which was near to the Western Railway station. Part of the suburb later became known as Constitution Hill, Winston Hills and Pendle Hill.

== History ==
The traditional inhabitants of the land included the Tugagal clan of the Dharug peoples.

=== European settlement ===
The First Fleet arrived in 1788.

In 1788 the Parramatta area was settled, then called Rose Hill, as a government farm for the colony.

In 1791 there were food shortages and David Collins referred to ‘new ground’ as the area chosen 2.4km from Parramatta, later to be known as Toongabbie.

Boat travel was the fastest method of transportation in early Australian history for both the original inhabitants and the new settlers. This area was chosen because of the location on the meeting of two waterways, Toongabbie Creek and Quarry Creek. The Aboriginal inhabitants were consulted and the ‘Toongabbie’ is thought to mean ‘a place near the water’ which became the name of the town.

Toongabbie was founded as a Government Farm to grow food for the colony in April 1792.

=== Life of convicts at Toongabbie ===
The working conditions of the convicts at Toongabbie were harsh and these workers had hard lives. They often worked without adequate food and using primitive tools in the harsh sun. Their work included felling trees, digging up stumps and carrying the timber to convenient places for use or transportation. Using simple spades, hoes or their bare hands they uprooted local vegetation and grass to make way for crops and houses. Superintendents often mistreated the convicts and there were reports of 7 or 8 persons per day dying on the job from overwork, malnutrition, heat stroke, the cold and possibly lack of sleep etc. Sometimes workers would die on the way to the hospital or while waiting in line for their meal. Living conditions included crowded quarters such as up to 18 people living in a small hut. They often didn’t have blankets, beds, eating utensils or warm clothes for winter months.

=== Post farm operations ===
After eleven years, the government farm was closed and the land was given as grants to settlers and convicts who had done their time.

In 1860, the railway was extended to Blacktown but it took 20 years before any arrangements were made for trains to stop at Toongabbie. The first school in Toongabbie, opened on 3 May 1886. By April 1911, the school closed due to low enrolments. The school reopened February the next year and has stayed open ever since.

The first post office in the area was opened after many years of campaigning by local residents in 1887 in a private house on Old Windsor Road and this arrangement continued until the 1960s. The first post master was a Mr Birks wand he was paid 25 pounds a year to manage the office and bring the mail bag over from Seven Hills on horseback each day. By 1922 the number of residents and businesses had grown sufficiently to support a second office in a weatherboard cottage in Wentworth Avenue, known as Toongabbie West. A purpose built office was opened in the main shopping area in Portico Parade in 1960 becoming Toongabbie Post Office whilst the old Toongabbie Post Office was renamed Old Toon

The area continued to be known as Toongabbie until the construction of the Main Western railway line and the building of the railway station of Toongabbie. Over time the location of the station and the shops around it became known as Toongabbie and the original settlement was called Old Toongabbie to differentiate the two.

From the 1990s part of this area was unofficially known as the locality of Constitution Hill. The suburb of Constitution Hill was officially recognised in 2007.

== Geography ==
The area is bounded on the north east by Toongabbie Creek, a tributary of the Parramatta River. Although Toongabbie is relatively densely settled, in recent years programs of bushland regeneration, pollution control and remedial works to local waterways have seen a surprising return by several rare wildlife species, and in the 1990s platypus were reported to have returned to sections of Toongabbie Creek.

== Notable residents ==
- Former NSW Premier Nathan Rees was raised in Old Toongabbie and attended Northmead Creative and Performing Arts High School.
