= Toongabbie =

- Suburb
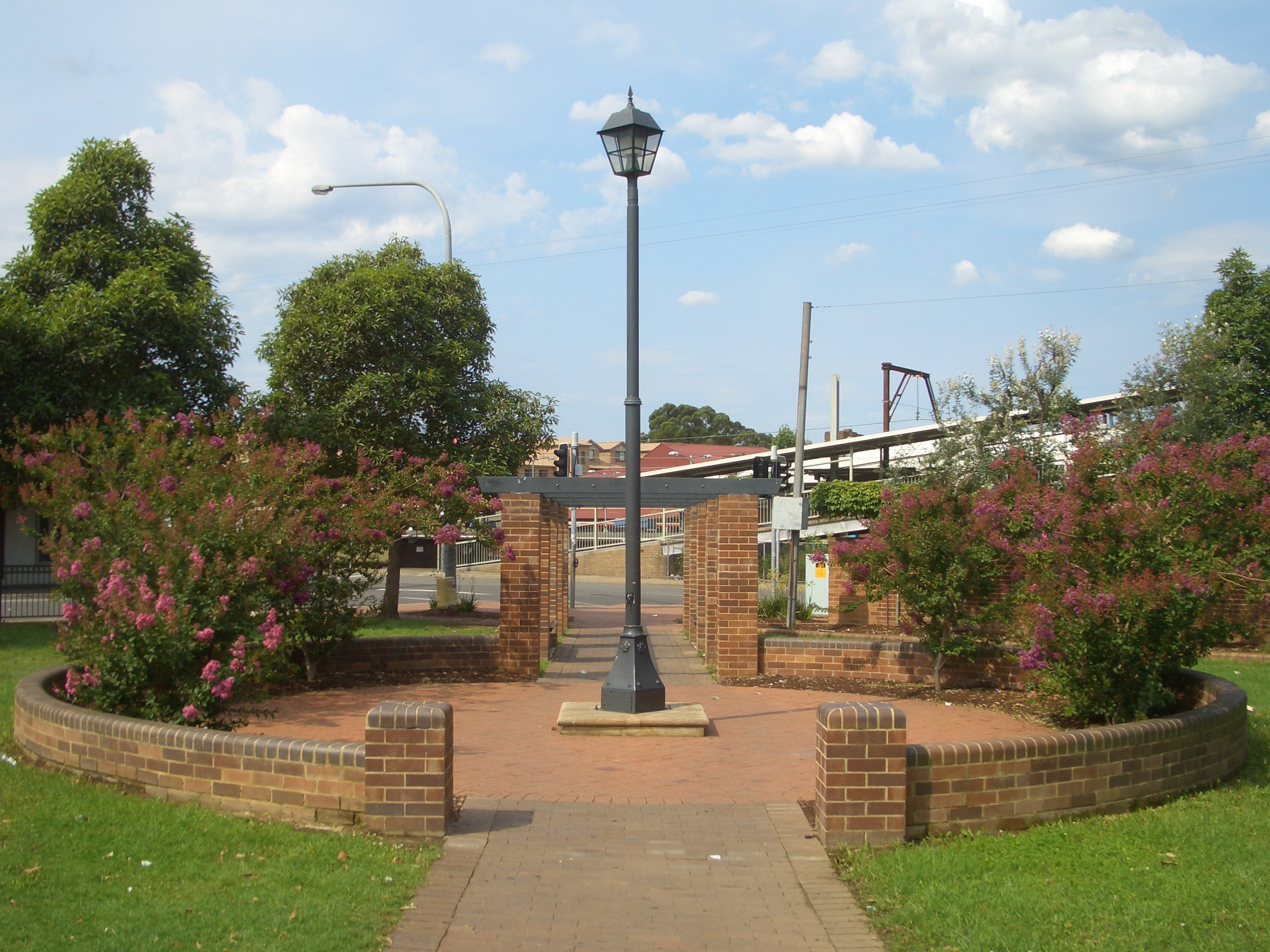
- Portico Park

- Interactive map of Toongabbie
- Coordinates: 33°47′10″S 150°57′23″E
- Country: Australia
- State: New South Wales
- Region: Greater Western Sydney
- City: Sydney
- LGAs: Blacktown City Council; City of Parramatta; Cumberland City Council
- Location: 30 km (19 mi) west of Sydney CBD; 8.5 km (5.3 mi) west of Parramatta
- Established: 1792

Government
  - State electorates: Prospect; Winston Hills
  - Federal divisions: McMahon; Parramatta

Area
  - Total: 23.453 km^{2} (9.055 sq mi)
- Elevation: 33 m (108 ft)

Population
  - Total: 16,177 (2021 census)
  - Density: 689.76/km^{2} (1,786.48/sq mi)
- Postcode: 2146
Suburbs around Toongabbie
Lalor Park	Winston Hills	Winston Hills
Seven Hills	Toongabbie	Old Toongabbie
Prospect	Girraween	Pendle Hill

Toongabbie is a suburb of Sydney, in the state of New South Wales a state in Australia. One of the oldest suburbs in Sydney, Toongabbie is located approximately 30 kilometres west of the Sydney central business district and is part of the Greater Western Sydney region. Toongabbie is split between the local government areas of the City of Parramatta, the City of Blacktown and Cumberland Council. The suburb is often locally referred to as "Toonie".

== Geography ==
To the north across Old Windsor Road the next suburb is Winston Hills; to the east is Old Toongabbie; to the south-east, the next suburb (and railway station) is Pendle Hill; to the south is Girraween; to the south-west is Prospect; and to the west the next suburb (and railway station) is Seven Hills.

== History ==
The traditional custodians of the land are the Dharug peoples. These peoples usually lived along the waterways. Plant and animals life was abundant in streams and bushland in the area now known as Toongabbie.

Toongabbie is derived from an Aboriginal word, reported as meaning place by the water or the meeting of the waters. It was named in June 1792 after Governor Arthur Phillip asked the local Aboriginal people what they called the place.

=== European settlement ===
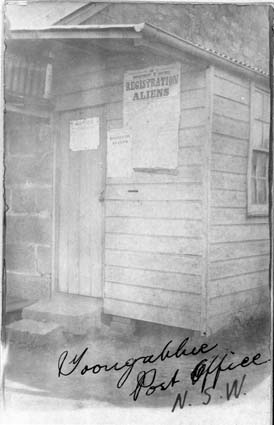
Toongabbie Post Office 1901

Toongabbie is noted for being the third mainland settlement (after Sydney and Parramatta) set up after the European colonisation of Australia began in 1788, although the site of the settlement is actually in the separate suburb of Old Toongabbie.

Governor Phillip established a government farm and convict station on 640 acres (259 ha) in 1791 to grow food for the colony. It was supplement to the farms already established at Rose Hill. By December 1791 there were 500 men working at clearing the land. After eleven years, the government farm was closed and the land was given as grants to settlers and convicts who had done their time. The Battle of Parramatta, a major battle of the Hawkesbury and Nepean Wars, occurred in March 1797 where Aboriginal resistance leader Pemulwuy led a group of Bidjigal warriors, estimated to be at least 100, in an attack on a government farm at Toongabbie, challenging the colonists to fight.

In 1860, the railway was extended to Blacktown but it took 20 years before any arrangements were made for trains to stop at Toongabbie. The first school in Toongabbie - Toongabbie Public School, opened on 3 May 1886. By April 1911, the school closed due to low enrolments. The school reopened February the next year and has stayed open ever since.

The Emu and Prospect Gravel and Road Metal Company Limited opened a private railway line from Toongabbie to Prospect Quarry on 7 April 1902. Following the inability of the Government railway to supply rail wagons, trains stopped running on the line in 1945, however the rails remained in situ until the early 1960s.

In 1908, what was probably the second scout group formed in Australia, 1st Toongabbie Scout Group was organised by Errol Knox (later knighted for his services to journalism). The first scout hall was a barn on his parents' property, "Montargis" in Binalong Road. Later, in 1934, the Group moved to its present location in Bungaree Road on donated land which had also once been part of the Knox landholdings.

Since the 1990s, many detached homes have been demolished to make way for apartment blocks, especially around the main commercial area of Toongabbie.

=== Old Toongabbie ===
To the east of Binalong Road and Reynolds Street is the small suburb known as Old Toongabbie, which includes the sites of the original colonial settlement. In the 1990s, this area was reduced, with the part immediately north of Wentworthville, which is also known unofficially as the locality of Constitution Hill, being reclassified as Wentworthville. In 2006, Constitution Hill officially returned, but only as a small area between Bogalara Road and the Cumberland Highway.

=== Winston Hills ===
The more northerly parts, north of Toongabbie Creek, became known as Winston Hills in the late 1960s. Originally this was simply the name of a large housing development in the area, but a major section of what was once Old Toongabbie was officially renamed Winston Hills in the 1970s, a trend that has been echoed in many other areas of the western suburbs.

== Commercial area ==
Toongabbie's shopping precinct is located in Aurelia Street to the south of the railway line next to the station. The shopping precinct for many years included a small independent suburban cinema, the "Rocket Theatre", located opposite the railway line, next to the overhead road bridge. It operated from the late 1950s until the early 1970s, when it was demolished and replaced by a row of shops. A small park by the name of Portico Plaza, directly opposite the train station and next to Toongabbie Hotel. A small shopping centre and supermarket, the Piccadilly Centre, was built in the 1960s in the area bounded by the Toongabbie Hotel and the Catholic Church. This operated until 2004 when the Piccadilly shopping centre and surrounding properties were purchased by a developer to eventually build Portico Plaza, a shopping centre with a Woolworths supermarket and over 40 specialty shops. During the 2010s, many stores and takeaways catering to South Asian residents began opening in Toongabbie.

== Transport ==
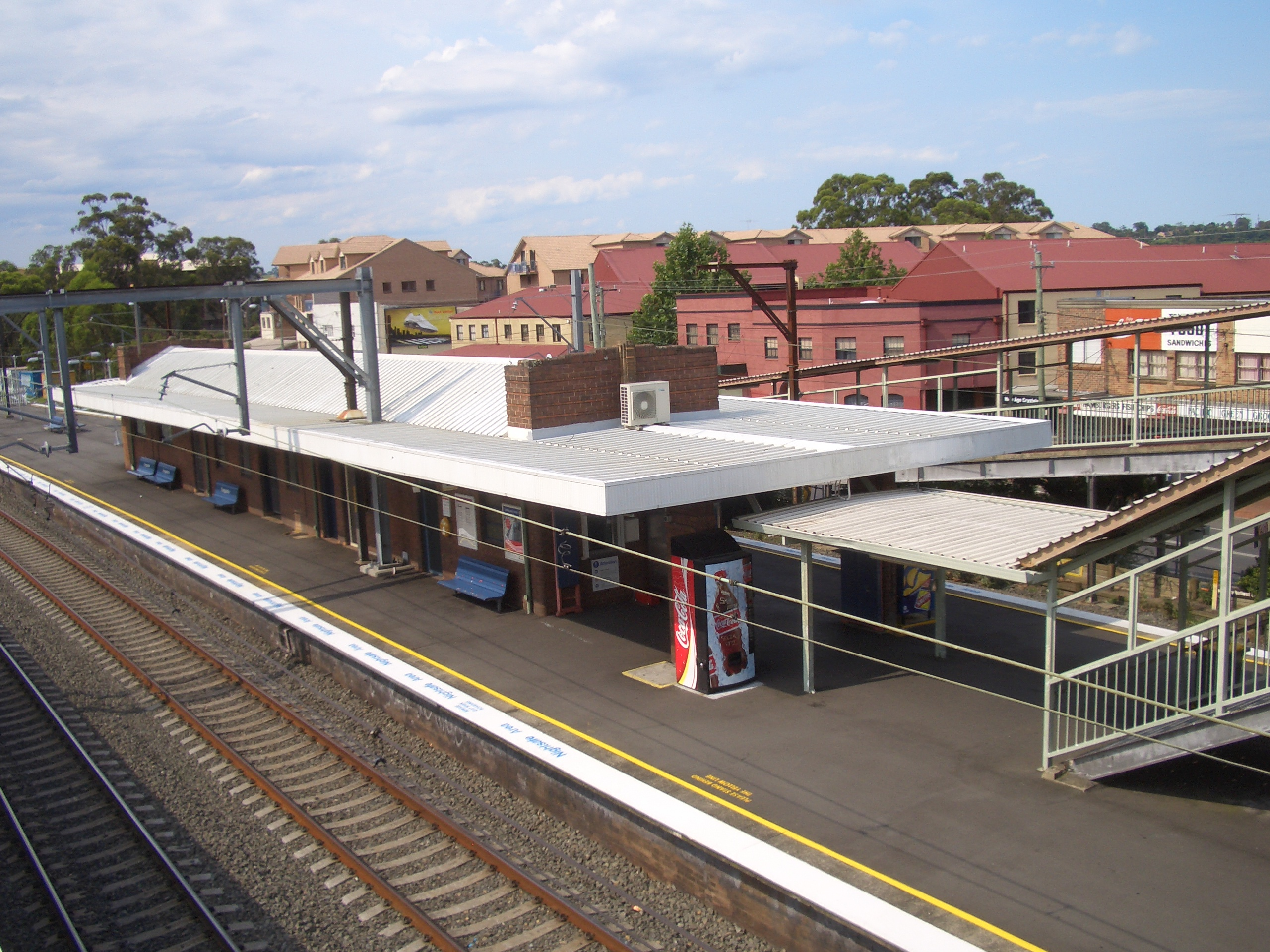
Toongabbie railway station

Toongabbie railway station is on the T1 Western Line of the Sydney Trains network. The original unstaffed station opened on 26 April 1880 and was upgraded over the years with additional platforms and loading facilities. In the late 1880s the first rail official was appointed to manage the station, a Miss Amy Arnold. The current station was opened in 1946 and the line was electrified in 1955. The overhead road bridge was opened in 1947 (before that there was a level crossing where the western end of the station platforms are now). The train station was upgraded in the late 2010s to include elevators.

Toongabbie is also served by private buses with connections to Blacktown via Blacktown Road, Seven Hills via the Prospect Highway, and both Parramatta and Westmead via the Great Western Highway. Toongabbie is also served by the North-West T-way.

== Landmarks ==
Although Toongabbie is relatively densely settled, in recent years programmes of bushland regeneration, and pollution control in local waterways have improved the few and small pockets of vegetation in the suburb. The main waterway is Greystanes or Girraween Creek which flows the length of the suburb from Fox Hills Golf Course in the south to join Blacktown Creek in the north. A one kilometre section of Greystanes Creek has been channelised as part of a flood-mitigation project. Greystanes Creek often floods heavily during rainy days, sometimes overflowing onto Station Road.

== Recreation ==
There are multiple parks and recreational areas in Toongabbie. Fox Hill Golf Club is located on the western side of the suburb. McCoy Park is located in eastern Toongabbie, next to the border with Seven Hills, and close to a small row of shops. It contains toilets, a large field, and a playground. It is located by the creek. Toongabbie Sports Club is located along Station Road, containing a bowling club.

== Demographics ==
Historical population
Year	Pop.	±%
2001	12,800	—
2006	12,343	−3.6%
2011	13,003	+5.3%
2016	14,337	+10.3%
2021	16,177	+12.8%

According to the 2021 census, 16,177 people lived in Toongabbie. Their median age was 35 years; children aged 0–14 years made up 20.2% of the population and people aged 65 years and over made up 12.8% of the population. 43.8% of people were born in Australia; the next most common countries of birth were India 20.5%, Sri Lanka 6.0%, Philippines 2.7%, China 2.7% and Nepal 2.1%.

== Notable residents ==
- Bruce Beresford – film director, writer, and producer
- Ebanie Bridges – boxer
- Karl Filiga – former professional rugby league footballer for the Cronulla Sharks
- David Klemmer – current rugby league player
- John Larkin – author, winner of the 2012 Victorian Prize for Literature for The Shadow Girl
- Lawrence Thomas - football player for most notably Melbourne Victory.

== Education ==
Toongabbie has several schools including Toongabbie Public School, Toongabbie West Public School, Toongabbie Christian College and Metella Road Public School. There are also multiple preschools.
