= Prospect Highway =

Road in Sydney, Australia

Prospect Highway (numerous constituent roads) New South Wales
- The highway through the Pemulwuy industrial estate at the former Prospect quarry site, looking east toward Turnbull Close.
- Coordinates: 33°45′57″S 150°57′29″E (Northeast end); 33°50′01″S 150°54′46″E (Southwest end)

General information
- Type: Road
- Length: 11.1 km (6.9 mi)
- Gazetted: August 1988
- Former route number: State Route 63 (1992–1998) (Blacktown–Prospect)

Major junctions
- Northeast end: M2 Hills Motorway; Baulkham Hills, Sydney
- Old Windsor Road; Blacktown Road; Great Western Highway; Western Motorway
- Southwest end: Widemere Road; Pemulwuy, Sydney

Location(s)
- Major suburbs: Seven Hills, Blacktown, Prospect

Prospect Highway is an 11.1-kilometre (6.9 mi) secondary urban road linking Baulkham Hills and Pemulwuy in the western suburbs of Sydney, New South Wales, Australia. The highway provides a free alternative link from the tolled M2 Hills and the Westlink M7 motorways in the northeast to the M4 Western Motorway in the southwest and further south. This name covers a few consecutive roads and is widely known to most drivers, but the entire allocation is also known – and signposted – by the names of its constituent parts: Abbott Road, Seven Hills Road, Wall Park Avenue, Blacktown Road and Prospect Highway proper.

== Route ==
The highway takes its name from the suburb Prospect; like many highways in the Sydney area, it was formed by linking a series of local roads.

Prospect Highway starts at the intersection of Old Windsor Road and the eastbound ramps to M2 Hills Motorway as Abbotts Road and heads in a westerly direction as a four-lane, dual-carriageway road, where after a short distance it widens to a six-lane road and intersects with and changes name to Seven Hills Road, before reaching the intersection with Station Road and Johnson Avenue nearly immediately afterwards, where it changes name again to Prospect Highway. It narrows back to a four-lane road once it crosses the Main Western railway line, until it meets Seven Hills Road South, where it narrows to a single-carriageway road and heads west, changing name again to Wall Park Avenue. It widens again to a dual-carriageway road just before it intersects with and changes name to Blacktown Road, heading south and narrowing to a dual-lane, single carriageway road south of the intersection with Bungarribee Road. Blacktown Road splits off southeast after a short distance: the name changes again back to Prospect Highway and continues south through Prospect until it crosses over both Great Western Highway and M4 Western Motorway, continuing south until it eventually terminates at the intersection with the Liverpool–Parramatta Transitway in Pemulwuy; the road continues southwards as Widemere Road.

== History ==
Constructed in 1924, the Widemere Quarry Line, which was connected to the Main Southern Line at Fairfield railway station, crossed what is now Prospect Highway.

The passing of the Main Roads Act of 1924 through the Parliament of New South Wales provided for the declaration of Main Roads, roads partially funded by the State government through the Main Roads Board (MRB). With the subsequent passing of the Main Roads (Amendment) Act of 1929 to provide for additional declarations of State Highways and Trunk Roads, the Department of Main Roads (having succeeded the MRB in 1932) declared Main Road 644 along Prospect Highway, from the intersection with Old Windsor Road in Seven Hills, along Abbott and Seven Hills Roads, Wall Park Avenue, Blacktown Road and Church Lane to the interchange with M4 Western Motorway in Prospect, on 26 August 1988.

Church Lane, from Great Western Highway to Blacktown Road through Prospect, was officially renamed Prospect Highway on 5 April 1991. Later, the section of Seven Hills Road, between the intersection with Station Road and Johnson Avenue, and the intersection with Wall Park Avenue in Seven Hills, was also officially renamed Prospect Highway on 27 November 1992.

The passing of the Roads Act of 1993 updated road classifications and the way they could be declared within New South Wales. Under this act, Prospect Highway retains its declaration as Main Road 644.

The route was allocated State Route 63 in 1992, between Blacktown and Prospect, but was removed a few years later in 1998. The entire route is currently unallocated.

=== Proposals ===
In 2015, the NSW Government Roads & Maritime Services commenced planning an upgrade of a 3.6-kilometre (2.2 mi) section of the highway between Reservoir Road in Prospect to St Martins Crescent in Blacktown.

== Exits and interchanges ==
LGA	Location	km	mi	Destinations	Notes
Blacktown	Baulkham Hills–Seven Hills boundary	0.0	0.0	M2 Hills Motorway (M2 east) – Macquarie Park, Lane Cove, Sydney CBD	North-eastern terminus of highway, eastern end of Abbott Road; South-eastbound entrance to and north west bound exit from motorway only
Blacktown	Baulkham Hills–Seven Hills boundary	0.0	0.0	Old Windsor Road (A2 north, A40 south) – Windsor, Parramatta	
Blacktown	Seven Hills	1.4	0.87	Seven Hills Road (northeast) – Bella Vista	No right turn westbound into Seven Hills Road at T-intersection; Western end of Abbott Road, southeastern end of Seven Hills Road
Blacktown	Seven Hills	1.6	0.99	Johnson Avenue (north) – Kings Langley; Station Road (south) – Toongabbie	Southwestern end of Seven Hills Road, northeastern end of Prospect Highway
Blacktown	Seven Hills	2.6	1.6	Main Western railway line	
Blacktown	Seven Hills	3.1	1.9	Seven Hills Road South (south) – Prospect	Southwestern end of Prospect Highway, eastern end of Wall Park Avenue at T-intersection
Blacktown	Blacktown	4.2	2.6	Blacktown Road (west) – Blacktown	Western end of Wall Park Avenue, northern end of Blacktown Road at T-intersection
Blacktown	Seven Hills–Blacktown boundary	4.6	2.9	Bungarribee Road (west) – Blacktown, Doonside; Leabons Lane (east) – Toongabbie	
Blacktown	Seven Hills–Blacktown boundary	6.1	3.8	Blacktown Road (southeast) – Toongabbie	Southern end of Blacktown Road, northern end of Prospect Highway at T-intersection
Blacktown	Prospect	7.2	4.5	Great Western Highway (A44) – Wentworthville, Rooty Hill	Modified diamond interchange, westbound entrance and exit from Great Western Highway via Ponds Road
Blacktown	Prospect	7.6	4.7	M4 Western Motorway (M4) – Penrith, Eastern Creek, Parramatta, Sydney CBD	Diamond interchange
Blacktown	Prospect	8.1	5.0	Reservoir Road – Prospect Reservoir	
Cumberland	Pemulwuy	11.1	6.9	Widemere Road – Wetherill Park	Southern terminus of highway, continues south as Widemere Road
Incomplete access; Tolled; Route transition

== See also ==
- Prospect Hill, a prominent hill located near the highway
