= Toongabbie Creek =

Coordinates: 33°47′S 150°58′E

Toongabbie Toongabbee Creek, Quarry Creek
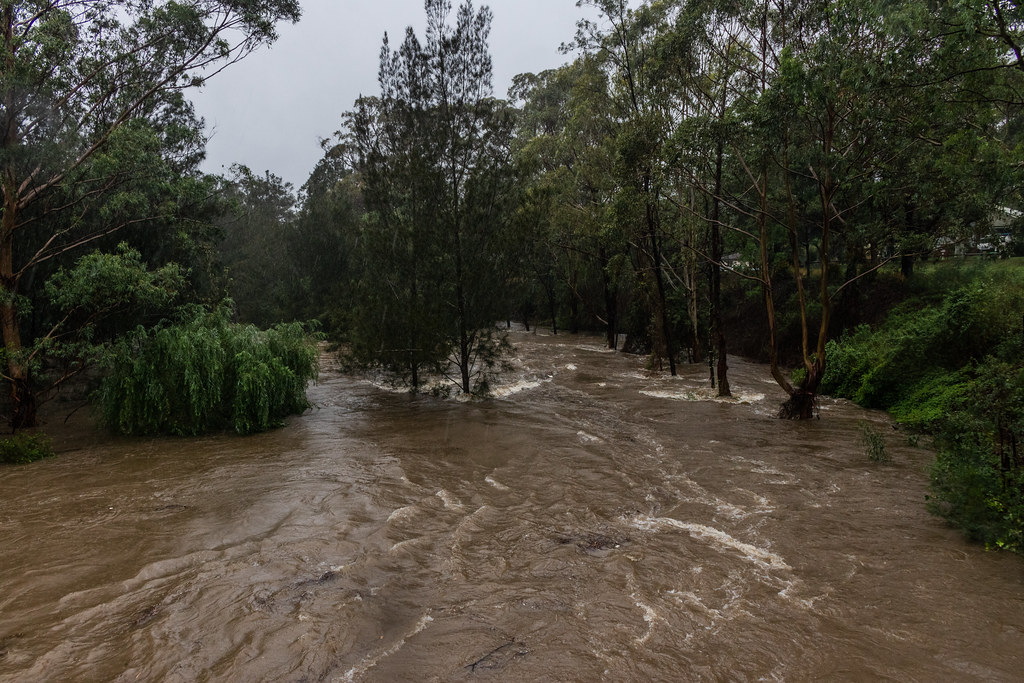
- Toongabbie Creek in Flood, Peter Parade, Old Toongabbie

Location
- Country: Australia
- State: New South Wales
- Region: Sydney basin (IBRA), Greater Western Sydney
- Local government areas: The Hills, Blacktown, Cumberland, Parramatta

Physical characteristics
- Source
  - location: Castle Hill
- Mouth: confluence with Darling Mills Creek to form the Parramatta River
  - location: Northmead
- Length: 9 km (5.6 mi)
- Basin size: 107 km^{2} (41 sq mi)

Basin features
- River system: Parramatta River catchment
- Tributaries
  - right: Glenmire Creek, Blacktown Creek

Toongabbie Creek, an urban watercourse that is part of the Parramatta River catchment, is located in Greater Western Sydney, New South Wales, Australia.

== Course and features ==
Toongabbie Creek rises in the north-western suburbs of Sydney, west of the Old Northern Road, within the suburb of Castle Hill; with its headwaters forming the watershed boundary between the Hornsby Plateau and the Cumberland Plain. The creek flows generally south-west, then south by east, then south by west, then east before reaching its confluence with the Darling Mills Creek to form the Parramatta River, in the suburb of North Parramatta, in land adjoining the northern boundary of the Cumberland Hospital. The course of the creek is approximately 9 kilometres (5.6 mi).

Although only a small portion of Toongabbie Creek is contained within the Blacktown local government area, much of its sub-catchment, including the Blacktown and Lalor creeks and their associated tributaries are within the City of Blacktown. In 2005, the Toongabbie Creek catchment area was rated as the highest polluting catchment out of the twenty-two catchments in Blacktown. Much of the creek is channeled in a concrete drain; and domestic garbage is often scattered along the creek's banks. Prior to April 2015, the creek was dammed at many places by fallen trees, and the rapids at Mons Road were not visible. The stagnant water in the dams was bubbly. After the rain in April 2015, which caused a flood that damaged infrastructure at Parramatta, most of the dead trees were cleaned away and the rocks at Mons Road are now exposed.

Toongabbie Creek is transversed by the Cumberland Highway; the Westlink M7 and M2 Hills Motorway at their interchange; and the Old Windsor Road.

The land adjacent to the Parramatta River and its tributaries, including the Toongabbie Creek, was occupied for many thousands of years by the Burramattagal, Toongagal, Wallumattagal, Wangal, and Wategora Aboriginal peoples. They used the river as an important source of food and a place for trade.

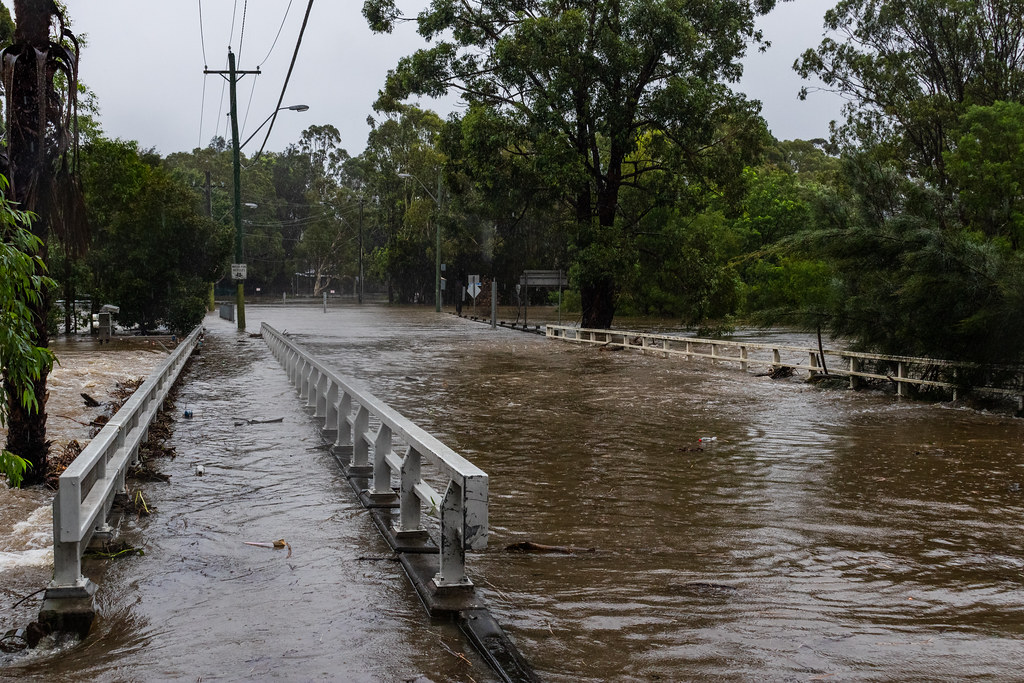
Toongabbie Creek in Flood, Oakes Road, Winston Hills

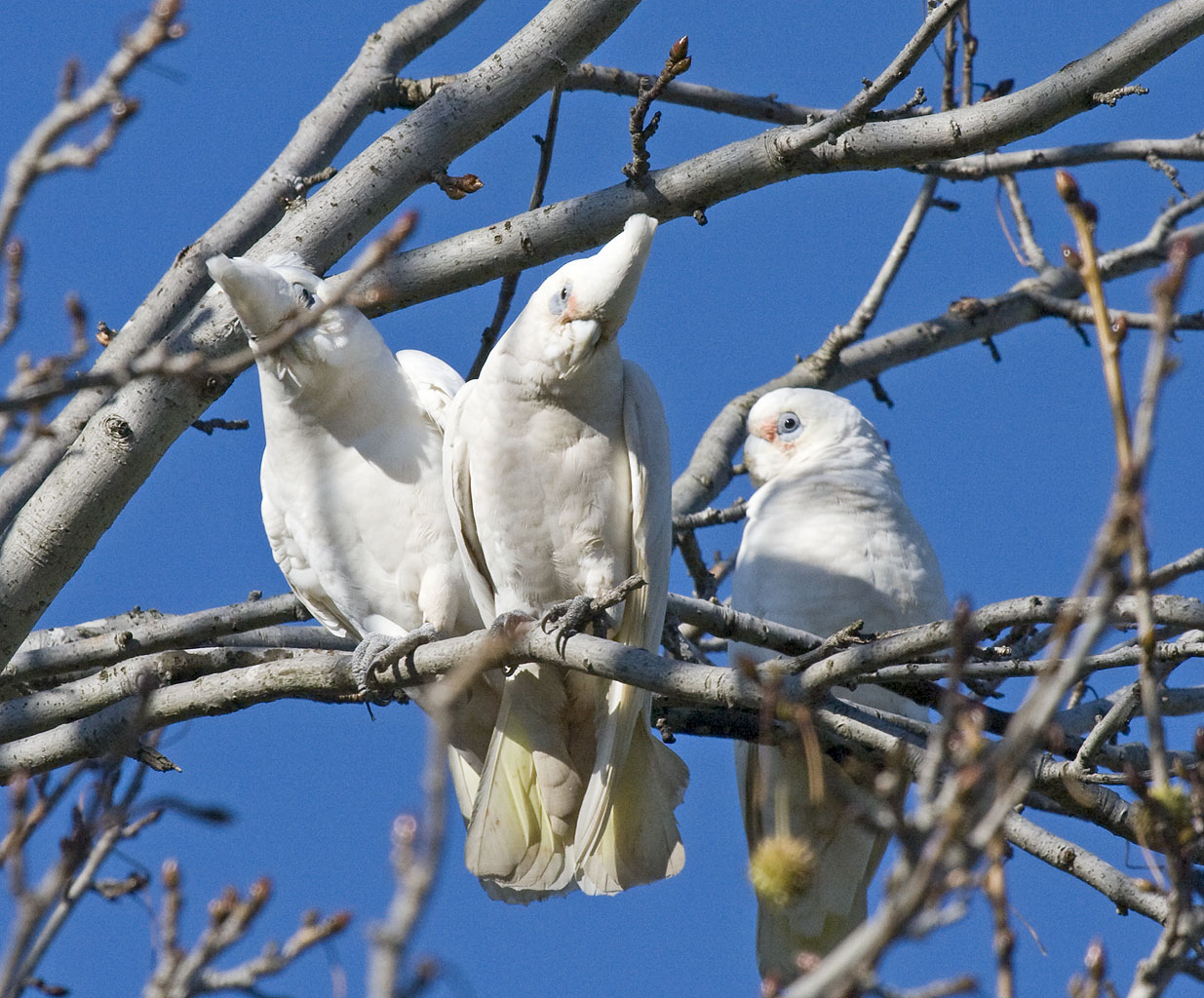
Little Corellas (Cacatua sanguinea), photographed beside Toongabbie Creek, suburban Sydney.

== History ==
The traditional custodians of the land include peoples from various tribes. The Dharug peoples lived along the river which was a source of food including mullet, crayfish, shellfish, turtles and plants.

Burramattagal, Toongagal, Wallumattagal, Wangal, and Wategora Aboriginal peoples used the river for food and for trade.

With the colonisation, the tall ships and other water vessels were able to navigate down the river. River was the fastest source of transport for both the original tribes occupying the land and also for early Australian colonial history.

"Toongabbee" later become spelt as new as Toongabbie, was shown on a map in 1792 as the "Town of Toongabby". This was a very early settlement in colonial Australia, the appeal of the location being on the river.

Various land grants around the area were later subdivided. The creek volume lessened and the river from Sydney to Toongabbie is no longer navigateable via vessel beyond Parramatta.

== See also ==
- Rivers of New South Wales
