= St Andrew's Anglican Church, Seven Hills =

St Andrew's Anglican Church (former)
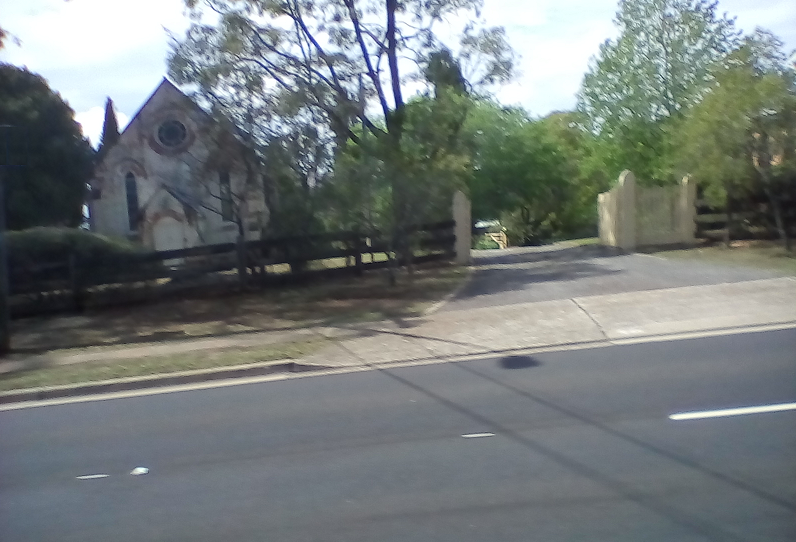
- St Andrew's (now a private residence), pictured in 2018
- St Andrew's Anglican Church (former)
- 33°45′39″S 150°57′14″E
- Location: 313 Seven Hills Road, Seven Hills, City of Blacktown, New South Wales
- Country: Australia
- Denomination: Anglican
- Website: windsoranglican.asn.au/home

History
- Status: Church

Architecture
- Functional status: Inactive
- Architect: G. H. Stoker
- Architectural type: Church (former)
- Style: Victorian Ecclesiastical
- Years built: 1863–1892
- Completed: 22 October 1879
- Closed: 1977

New South Wales Heritage Register
- Official name: St. Andrew's Anglican Church, Hall & Rectory; St Andrew's; St Andrews
- Type: State heritage (complex / group)
- Designated: 2 April 1999
- Reference no.: 57
- Type: Church
- Category: Religion
- Builders: G. H. Stoker

St Andrew's Anglican Church is a heritage-listed former Anglican church complex and now private residence at 313 Seven Hills Road, Seven Hills, City of Blacktown, Sydney, New South Wales, Australia. It was designed by G. H. Stoker, and built by Stoker from 1863 to 1892. It is also known as St. Andrew's Anglican Church, Hall & Rectory, St Andrew's and St Andrews. The property is privately owned. It was added to the New South Wales State Heritage Register on 2 April 1999.

== History ==
=== Seven Hills ===
Seven Hills was first settled when Matthew Pearce, a free settler who arrived on board the "Surprise" in 1794, was granted 65 hectares (160 acres) in 1795. He named it King's Langley after an English village about 30 kilometres (19 mi) south of London; it is believed he was born in the manor house at that village. His grant was bounded by the present Old Windsor Road, Seven Hills Road, Chapel Lane (Baulkham Hills) and Toongabbie Creek. Because his family could see seven hills from their home, the area became known as Seven Hills, a title it has borne since 1800.

Pearce was interred in St. John's Cemetery, Parramatta but later his remains were removed. Today Pearce and his family lie peacefully in a private cemetery which his descendants set up near the corner of Seven Hills Road and the Old Windsor Road (facing Bella Vista Farm which belonged for much of the 19th century to the Pearce family), itself now heritage-listed as the Pearce Family Cemetery.

In the early 1900s there was a small village in the area. A tile works was established about 1900 (later Norbrick) and continued to operate for about 60 years.

Seven Hills Road still displays its early establishment as an important transport link by following the line of high ground between the Windsor Road (now Old Windsor Road) and Prospect).

A railway link built by 1863 from Parramatta to Penrith and including Seven Hills Station, stimulated development of the area into a prosperous orcharding district, which, during the land boom of the 1880s, soon became intensive farmlets.

Seven Hills had a Department of Agriculture Poultry Research Station, Grantham Poultry Research Station, established before World War I. Nearby Grantham High School is on land that was also part of the Pearce Estate.

=== St. Andrew's Anglican Church, Hall and Rectory Group ===
The land on which the church, hall and rectory is located is closely associated with early pioneer families of the area.

W. Freame, noted local historian and Lay Representative at the Anglican Synod, records "During 1863 a brick building was erected to do duty as a chapel of ease and a school, and here services were held on Sundays for many years, until 1880 when St. Andrew's Church was opened. This appears to refer to the oldest of the three buildings on the site. A typescript history of Seven Hills (North) Public School (directly adjacent to the Church's site) (copy in Blacktown Archives) mentions that services had been held in the Anglican Denominational School, corner of Abbotts' Road and Seven Hills Road, since the 1850s.

The church was officially opened by the Anglican Archbishop of Sydney on 22 October 1879. It seems however to have been in use for most of 1878, the first baptism being recorded on 14 April 1878.

Ministers of the original parish of Prospect and Seven Hills had resided at Parramatta until 1860, and their successors until 1860 lived in rented houses within the parish. The Rev. T. Donkin (1855-76) lived in a cottage owned by J. Pye on the Old Windsor Road. Here he conducted a small private school for gentlemen's sons.

Four of the six side windows were dedicated to members of the Pearce family, descendants of Matthew Pearce, pioneer free settler in the 1790s (and later of "Bella Vista" or "Seven Hills" farm). Other memorials to pioneer families were in the church until its closure.

Freame records the memorials that were in St. Andrew's Church in 1923, these included:

- at the east end a fine three light window in memory of Eliza Pearce, died 20 February 1878;
- William Thomas Pearce, died 9 February 1865; and
- James Robert Knaggs, died 15 January 1878.

There were also memorial windows to Amelia Neale and William Pearce. Three mural tablets were memorials to A. G. J. Neale (1825-1906), William John Pearce (1835–1898); and Amelia Ann Neale (1836–1865). The Neales and the Pearces were related by marriage. The brass book rest and vases on the communion table were in memory of the late Phillip Pearce, JP, church warden.

Freame lists the leading "founding parishioners" of St. Andrew's as: "The Pearces, Howards, Briens, Meurants, Davis and Horwood". Apart from Street names and one or two homesteads (e.g.: Exeter Farm Cottage was formerly known as Meurant's Cottage, on (then) Meurant's Lane), more or less under threat from developers, St. Andrew's is the last remaining visible memorial to these noted pioneer families of the district.

The three buildings comprise an intact precinct of early church buildings with high architectural and social value within the local area. The church building is a good example of Victorian Ecclesiastical architecture. The hall represents significant religious development in Seven Hills and the rectory is a fine late Victorian mansion which is rare within Blacktown.

The rectory's foundation stone was laid by the Primate of Australia and Bishop of Sydney, Rt. Rev. William Saumarez Smith, on 13 June 1891, alongside St. Andrew's church, which by that time had been in service for a decade or more. A large crowd was present for the ceremony, which was reported in the local press, and all the old families were well represented. The Cumberland Argus gave a full description of the building. It was being built by G. H. Stoker, who was both architect and contractor. In 1860 a parsonage was built between Seven Hills and Prospect, and paid for by public subscription. There were a couple of Catholic names among the subscribers. This parsonage was still standing in the 1920s. By 1890 however, St. Andrew's parishioners were determined to have a new parsonage of their own. Hence the visit of the Primate. The two-storey building would have nine rooms, bathroom, lavatory, study, kitchen, etc. The front was to be of attractive design, with cast iron columns to the full elevation. The bay window also was carried through to the roof and the balcony was to be 27 metres (90 ft) long. After laying the foundation stone there was a laying of donations on the stone. The trowel used was at least until recent years (1978) preserved in a glass case in the church.

c. 1955 the rectory behind the church was restored, after having been vacant for many years. About 1963 the original Victorian Gothic prayer desk and gilded communion rails, pulpit, lectern and pews were removed from the church. Photographs of the church before this time would allow their reinstatement. The church's stained glass windows are notable, the three eastern windows being exceptionally fine (costing A£100 each in 1880). An almost complete set of church financial statements covering the period from 1880s-1930s is retained by the author and forms a useful reference.

In 1978 the Anglican Church proposed retention of the manse but demolition of the church and hall, subdivision and disposal of the site for eight house lots, claiming the area was no longer desirable, that church activities had ceased in 1977, that it had no further use for the site and citing high maintenance costs. The National Trust of Australia (NSW) had recorded the church and hall. Heritage Council of New South Wales advice was sought by Blacktown City Council. The Heritage Council negotiated retention of the church and hall until the subdivision application was finalised. The church removed the stained glass windows from the church for safe-keeping.

== Description ==
The complex is in Seven Hills Road North, just south of its junction with Old Windsor Road, at Seven Hills. The land on which the church, hall and rectory is located is closely associated with early pioneer families of the area.

The site is visually prominent with the church on the hill providing an important local landmark.

The three buildings comprise an intact precinct of early church buildings. The complex is one of the most interesting and architecturally significant pre-1900 groups of buildings between Parramatta and Windsor.

=== Church (1878-1879) ===
The church building is a good example of late Victorian neo-Gothic church architecture with single nave in brickwork and galvanised iron roof. While having some crudity of detail as in the Vestry windows and the somewhat modest/mean entry porch, it transcends this in the generous proportions of its large windows and most satisfying way the component parts of the building are massed into the final structure. The proportions of the east window in the Chancel and the curve of the Chancel arch are very pleasing. The framework of the fine timber roof - an A-frame supported on semi-circular wooden arches sprung from stone corbels in the walls is important and could be considered the equal of some of the fine church roofs by Edmund Blacket & Son, or John Horbury Hunt. It is easily the most notable roof of its type in the outer western region of the metropolitan area. The varying designs of the dripstones over the windows provide an interesting and delightful (if not unique) touch to its details.

About 1963 the original Victorian Gothic Prayer Desk and gilded Communion Rails, pulpit, lectern and pews were removed. Photographs of the church before this time would allow reinstatement. The stained glass windows are notable, the three eastern windows being exceptionally fine (costing A£100 each in 1880).

As at 8 May 2013, the church structurally has two main faults: insufficient foundations and possible water entry from the gutters. The walls have been cracked for many years owing to foundation settlement. No further cracking has occurred over the past 26 years. Though in need of underpinning for long term preservation, the building is quite safe and structurally stable. Sufficient drainage to carry off rain water from the foundations is advisable. About 1968 an amateurish effort to underpin the walls was made by volunteers (though conducted over a long period during wet weather). The corbelled string course of bricks beneath the roof gutters projects beyond the line of the roofing material and where the guttering has rotted, water is inclined to run into the building across this string course (on which the wall plates rest). This was corrected many years ago over some of the walls using flat galvanised steel bent over the corbelled string course and up behind the guttering, but further attention to this problem over all the walls would be advantageous, particularly in the vestry, as it could cause rot in the wall plates on which the rafters rest.

=== Hall (c. 1883) ===
The hall represents significant religious development in Seven Hills, a small, single-storey brick building with gable-ended roof in galvanised iron and Gothic arched windows.

The roof is wooden with scissor-style trusses. Until 1954 its roof was covered with slates. Problems with settlement of foundations have been reasonably successfully stabilised many years ago by iron tie-bars bolted transveresly across the building.

=== Rectory (1891) ===
The rectory behind the church is a fine late Victorian two-storied mansion with imposing double-storey verandah with iron lace balustrades and columns, which is rare within Blacktown. Circa 1955 the Rectory was restored, after having been vacant for many years. The two storey verandahs with cast iron columns and balustrades were removed, as was the cast iron balustrade to the top of its tower. Photographs exist of these features, which would allow reinstatement.

== Heritage listing ==
St Andrew's Anglican Church was listed on the New South Wales State Heritage Register on 2 April 1999.

== See also ==
- List of Anglican churches in the Diocese of Sydney
- List of former churches in Australia
- Australian non-residential architectural styles
