= Byera Hadley =

Australian architect and educator (1872–1937)

Byera Hadley (1872 – 26 November 1937) was an Australian architect and educator. He led the architecture programme at Sydney Technical College, which was the forerunner of the University of New South Wales Faculty of the Built Environment's architecture programme. He is known less for his buildings than for the scholarships issued in his name, as the Byera Hadley Travelling Scholarships, by the NSW Architects Registration Board.

== Early life and education ==
Byera Hadley was born in Cotham, Bristol, then part of Gloucestershire in England. He was the third son of E.A. Hadley and Florence Hadley. The family was comfortably off and Byera attended a private school in Clifton, Bristol.

Hadley arrived in Sydney in 1887. In 1888 he enrolled in the architecture programme at Sydney Technical College (STC) architecture programme, and was awarded 1st grade in his first‐year course in model drawing, and honours in freehand drawing.

== Career ==
=== STC ===
Hadley was working for the STC as "assistant lecturer, architectural classes" by 1899, and was promoted to "assistant teacher of Architectural and Trades Drawing" in the same year.

While also designing buildings in private practice, Hadley continued to teach part‐time at STC. In 1914, the superintendent, J.W. Turner, first fell ill and then retired. James Nangle, then lecturer‐in‐charge, was appointed first in an acting capacity and then promoted to the position, and Hadley was put in charge of the architecture course. Under his leadership, a formal five‐year architecture course was established by 1918, which was designed to fulfill the requirements of the new Architects Registration Act. Recognition of the course diploma was given by the Royal Institute of British Architects (RIBA), which meant that student architects trained at STC after 1923 were exempt from RIBA exams.

Hadley retired from the STC in 1927.

=== Architectural practice ===
He founded his private practice in 1897, as "B. Hadley, Architect", and became a Fellow of the Institute of Architects NSW in 1899. One of his earliest commissions was a solicitor's residence called Melrose House, on Grantham Estate (now Grantham Heritage Park, Seven Hills). The house is retained as a heritage building.

He designed Botany Town Hall in early Italian Renaissance style, and had various other commercial commissions. His buildings included the Sydney United Friendly Societies Dispensary and Medical Institute building in Macquarie Street (1902); Willoughby Town Hall (1903), and the Baumann Café (1904) in Pitt Street. Apart from Renaissance revival, he also employed Gothic Revival (such as the original wing of the Wesley College, Sydney University and its 1919 chapel) and Romanesque Revival style in some buildings.

After retirement from the STC in 1927, Hadley maintained his architectural practice until his death in 1937. During this time he designed, among others, Annesley School for Girls in Bowral for the Methodist Church (1923); the Colonial Mutual Building, 74 Pitt Street (1924); the Vickery Memorial Chapel (1926; in honour of Ebenezer Vickery MLC); Leigh College, Strathfield South, New South Wales, (1927); and the Wesley Hall in Rose Bay (1929).

== Personal life ==
In January 1899, Hadley married Florence Debelle of Petersham. A son was born on 4 December 1902. A daughter born in 1907 died at 10 months old in February 1908.

Hadley left the family home before his son was earning a living and made a small monthly payment to his wife. Florence trained as a nurse in order to provide for herself and for her son's education.

In the 1920s Hadley lived in a house he designed and named Hopes on acreage in Welby on the outskirts of Mittagong. In the 1930s he sold the property to members of the Cull family. The property is now known as Welby Park Manor. Fred and Ada Cull were Wesleyan benefactors who made possible many of the buildings Hadley designed for the Methodist Church in New South Wales.

His final residential address was 137 Livingstone Road, Marrickville. In his later years Hadley was cared for the nurse Rita Haley.

== Death and legacy ==
Hadley died suddenly on 26 November 1937 at Marrickville, of circulatory disease, and buried at Woronora Cemetery.

He left an estate worth £10,825. He left £500, as well as furniture and household and personal effects, for his nurse Rita Haley, and provided for an annuity of £200 for his wife. He left his library to the college, and the UNSW archives contain many of Hadley's notes, books, and photographs.

Hadley will included a bequest of £10,000 for the establishment a travelling scholarship, to be known as the Byera Hadley Travelling Scholarship. It was to be administered by the Board of Architects NSW, and available to graduates of the STC and Sydney University. The establishment of the scholarship was widely reported.

By 1939, Hadley's widow Florence, then 67, applied to the Equity Court for financial relief under the Family Maintenance Act. The judge was sympathetic and ordered that she be paid £100, as well as receiving "the net income of the estate (about £427 a year) for the rest of her life". The scholarship fund would come into effect on her death. The Permanent Trustees Co. and the Board of Architects (now the NSW Architects Registration Board) jointly managed the Byera Hadley estate until Florence Hadley's death in 1945. Negotiations between the two parties continued until 1950 when the Board specified the criteria for the scholarship thus:

The Award is to be made to the student and/or graduate who in the opinion of the Board gives promise of profiting most by study abroad, upon such evidence by way of competitions or otherwise as the Board may determine from time to time…".

The inaugural winner of the scholarship was Bryce Mortlock, in 1951, with conservationist Milo Dunphy being awarded in 1953. Other past winners include Ken Woolley, Colin Griffiths, Lawrence Nield, Deborah Dearing, Rachel Neeson, Stephen Collier, Sam Marshall, David Holm, and Tse Hui Teh.

== BHTS today ==
The Byera Hadley Travelling Scholarships (BHTS) are today administered by the NSW Architects Registration Board (ARB). The purpose is stated thus:

to provide financial support for the promotion and encouragement of students and/or graduates in architecture to undertake a course of study, research, or other activity approved by the NSW ARB. The Scholarship program must involve travel, which may be overseas or within Australia.

Several scholarships may be awarded, worth up to A$15,000 in the student category, and up to A$30,000 to graduates. Only students or graduates of an accredited architecture program offered by a NSW university are eligible for the award, which is judged on merit.

In 2024, five scholarships were awarded; three to graduates and two to students, with a total prize pool of $145,000.

The Byera Hadley Travelling Scholarship Fund is a registered trust fund with charitable status, administered by a small board.
