= Exeter Farm =

Heritage-listed residence in Glenwood, Sydney, built in 1845-1860

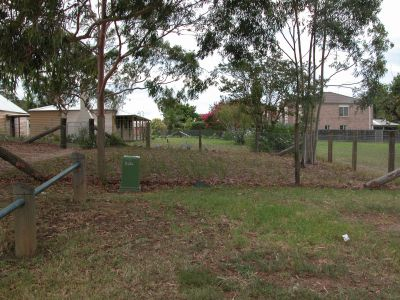
- Exeter Farm (on the left)

- Location within Sydney
- 33°44′30″S 150°56′01″E
- Location: 2 Knightsbridge Avenue, Glenwood, City of Blacktown, Sydney, New South Wales, Australia

History
- Built: 1845–1860

New South Wales Heritage Register
- Official name: Exeter Farm; Meurant's Cottage
- Type: State heritage (complex / group)
- Designated: 2 April 1999
- Reference no.: 205
- Type: Homestead Complex
- Category: Farming and Grazing
- Builders: Not known

Exeter Farm is a heritage-listed residence at 2 Knightsbridge Avenue, Glenwood, City of Blacktown, Sydney, New South Wales, Australia. It was built from 1845 to 1860. It is also known as Meurant's Cottage. It was added to the New South Wales State Heritage Register on 2 April 1999.

== History ==
There is no documentary evidence of when either of the two cottages were built. The name "Exeter Farm" is first referred to in the will of Peter Robert John Brien made in 1913. Daniel Brien, in his will of 1832, refers to his land as 110 acres (known locally as 'Eighty Acres').

=== Occupation by Daniel Bryan (Brien) ===
The first recorded evidence for occupation of this land is a grant of 110 acres to Daniel Bryan in 1821 by Governor Macquarie. However, it is known that Bryan was farming in the area much earlier than this, although exactly where he was farming in the Seven Hills district cannot be ascertained with any certainty. It was common practice in the early days of settlement for land grants to be a legitimisation of occupancy - squatters got to keep what they had taken.

Although the grant was for 110 acres, Daniel Brien's will states that the land was known locally as the "Eighty Acres". 3 A plan for the Surveyor General's Department in 1833 showing Brien's land also marks the area s 80 acres. 4 . He later added three farms to the north of his own grant from the original grantees William Randall (100 acres), Edward Pembry (60 acres) and Samuel Becket (60 acres). Exeter Farm Cottages shown as EFC in Figures 24 is likely to have been his first house. By 1832 he was living on Randall's land immediately to the north of his grant shown above marked R in Figure 24.

This type of amalgamation of a number of grants of fellow settlers is a significant postscript to the pre-1840 Government policy of settling large numbers of people on modest grants of land as a means of creating a "colonial yeomanry".

The "Eighty Acres" passed to his son, John Robert, in whose possession it remained until 1883. This was sold by John Robert Brien to his son Peter Robert John Brien in February of that year. This property remained in the family until 1923 when Peter Robert John's son Jack Aubrey Brien sold it to Blanche Bertha Whatmore.

=== Subsequent occupation ===
In 1925 Blanche Whatmore sold Brien's original 110 acres (+30 others) to William John Hamilton McFarland.

In 1930 when the property was sold again, the original 100 acres was split, and the portion containing Exeter Farm was bought by Arthur Jackson. Parts of Meurant's and Brien's grants were merged under the ownership of Charles William Hopkins in 1943.

In 1945 the property was sold to George James Pattrick and from his to RGM & ME King in 1949. They sold to Lena Mary Box in 1950 and she in turn to N. L. & M. J. Delaney in 1963. For a time part of the property was converted into a golf course known as Parklea Links which is clearly visible in aerial photographs taken in 1970. The Delaneys sold the farm to Australand who have developed it into a modern housing estate. The cottages on the block of land delineated in the PCO were given to the State by the Delaneys in 1997.

=== Property name ===
The place has been known by two names: Exeter Farm and Meurant's Cottage.

The name "Exeter" appears in Peter Robert John Brien's will, dated 1913, as the name of his property. No earlier reference has been found to the name. Daniel Brien's wife, Mary Ann Parker, was tried at Exeter in Devon and it is possible that this was her home town in England. The name "Exeter Farm" may be derived from the origin commemorating the home town of Peter Robert John Brien's grandmother.

The reason for the appellation 'Meurant's Cottage' is a historical confusion. Ferdinand Meurant, who was granted 50 acres of land next to Daniel Brien's lived in a house he built on his farm which he called "Frontignac". In 1882 Robert James Meurant, son of Ferdinand, married Harriet Brien, granddaughter of Daniel Brien. They lived in a house on Brien's land which, according to a descendant, Lorraine Wines, was pulled down around 1957 and her father, John Schofield, (aged 81 in 1982), himself a descendant of Meurant (4th generation removed) visited "Frontignac" several times whilst researching the family history. He states in his letter of July 29, 1892:

I have researched extensively the family of Meurant and that of Schofield and I am keen that there should not be any confusion regarding the building described as Meurant's Cottage, which, whatever else it may be, definitely is not the cottage built by Ferdinand Meurant on land granted to him in 1821 in what now is known as Meurant's Lane, Park Lea. This house was pulled down some 10 or 12 years ago.

Thus, although a Meurant may have lived in this house, or at least in another house built somewhere nearby, the more accurate name for the property must be Exeter Farm Cottage which links it to the former home in England of Daniel Brien's wife.

Exeter Farm is the latest property being conserved through the NSW Historic Houses Trust's Endangered Houses programme. The buildings have long baffled heritage practitioners. When the site was being considered for permanent conservation order in the 1980s, examination determined the two buildings to date from the very early 19th century. However, when they began conservation work in late 2008 and started painstakingly peeling back layers of fabric, they could not find what we needed to validate this early date. Initially the elaborate roof construction dated the buildings to the early 19th century. The ceiling joists spanning each room of the larger front building are dovetailed into the top plates, meaning that each end of each joist was individually cut at angles and set into an exactly matching cut on the top beam of the wall. This laborious and exacting technique minimised the use of expensive hand-made nails and was seldom seen in the colony at all, and only rarely from the 1850s. Other parts of the frame also show similarly rare and exacting methods of jointing.

The internal fabric also indicated an early 19th-century construction date. Initially the slab walls were simply coated with bitumen. Later they were covered with lath and plaster and then wallpaper, common in the second half of the 19th century. The original internal doors were simple ledged and sheeted with strap hinges mounted on gudgeon pins. It is not unusual to find early styles and techniques used in later buildings, but it is unusual in the cases of door and shutter hinges.

As such, the elaborate carpentry, wall coverings and door construction were consistent with an early 19th-century building, but then they made another crucial discovery. Critical parts of the building structure were put together using machine-made wire nails. Elements such as the timber wall slabs were housed with a simple cut in their tops and then fixed to the structure using two wire nails with their bottoms secured in a shallow trench slot, without any bottom bearing-plate. The nails changed not only how they thought about the character of the building as a mix of simple and more elaborate carpentry, but also its all-important construction date. Although machine-made nails were imported into Australia from 1853, they were seldom used until the mid 1860s and it wasn't until the 1870s that they had become the preferred fastener for many building purposes.

What the archaeological work on the building has revealed is a curious mixture of features. Exeter Farm is a combination of conservative "proper" carpentry and joinery, simple bush building and up-to-the-minute construction technology - all in a modest slab farm on the fringes of Sydney.

Exeter Farm was transferred to Sydney Living Museums in 2007 and restored under its Endangered Houses Fund, a program that identifies significant "at risk" properties and saves them from demolition and unsympathetic development. Before conservation works began, the two cottages were severely dilapidated and had been uninhabited for decades.

Exeter Farm was subsequently restored from 2008 to 2011, with works being completed in January 2011 with the intention of returning the property to private ownership. It was advertised for sale in 2012, and purchased by new owners Kent and Ashlee Weir in March 2013.

In December 2014 the Weirs were delighted to learn that their home had earned the remarkable distinction of a UNESCO Award of Merit for its conservation. At an official onsite ceremony, the chair of the Australian National Commission for UNESCO, Annmaree O'Keefe, presented the award to Design 5 Architects, the firm engaged by Sydney Living Museums to design, document and oversee extensive conservation work on the property. The restoration had earlier won the AIA (NSW) Greenway Award for Heritage Architecture in 2012 and a National Trust of Australia (NSW) Heritage Award in 2011.

== Description ==
=== Site and context ===
The place known as Exeter Farm comprised two separate single-storey buildings on a north–south axis on a small plot of land with a number of mature trees and other vegetation around them.

The cottages and their present curtilage were once part of a large block of land extending north to Meurants Lane. This has been subdivided and the site with the cottages is considerably reduced.

A large development of modern housing now surrounds the whole to the east, south and west. On the northern boundary lies a public reserve which allows limited view from the northern cottage to the Blue Mountains in the far distance. These views to the north are interrupted by the new housing in the middle-ground at the northern edge of the reserve. The views away to the north-west are completely obscured by new housing.

=== Curtilage ===
The cottages and their present curtilage were once part of a large block of land extending north to Meurants Lane. This has been subdivided and the site with the cottages is considerably reduced. The site's area is 3000 square metres.

Two analyses have been carried out by Michael Lehany on the remains of Exeter Farm - the parts not disturbed by the development and that land which lies within the Public Reserve. This was done in April 2001.

=== Analysis of existing landscape features ===
The remaining landscape shows the positions of the former buildings that stood as part of the farm complex. None of these could be saved as they were outside the PCO boundary and no action was taken to save them in time.

There are also, at the end of the old track which leads from Exeter Farm cottages to Meurants Lane, these two gateposts which are probably 19th century. They are weathered and worn but still in good condition. They are all that is left of the original boundary markers to the northern boundaries of the farm.

A large lemon scented gum (Corymbia citriodora) is to the south-east of the cottages. It has lost a number of major limbs and had much tree surgery in recent decades and more recent years. A number of seedlings from this tree lie between the cottages and the road to their east - some are considerable trees in their own right, others tiny seedlings.

A number of clumps of Cape plumbago (Plumbago capensis) lie to the north-east and north of the northern cottage.

A reasonably sized Port Jackson fig (some 10 m x 8 m) (Ficus rubiginosa) is to the south-west of the rear (southern) cottage. To the south-west of that again and on the current property (western) boundary is a large lemon scented gum.

A pomegranate bush ('Punica granatum') is directly west of the northern cottage, almost adjoining its verandah. This bush is of considerable age.

A Chinese wisteria (Wisteria sinensis) is growing on the temporary wire mesh fence north of the northern cottage. Before works began to restore the cottages, they were both partially (the northernmost, considerably) covered with creepers, mainly of cat's claw creeper (Doxantha unguis-cati) and Chinese wisteria. These have been removed now.

=== Cottages ===
The northern building comprises 7 spaces with a covered veranda running the length of the north and west sides. The southern cottage has 4 spaces, 3 of which are within an earlier veranda on the west and south, there is an open veranda on the south side which until recently was also partially enclosed.

A condition survey was undertaken in March 2001 by Design 5 Architects. A full structural survey has not been carried out at this stage although evidence of the structure was visible in places where external cladding had fallen off.

Both cottages are timber slab in construction and are lined internally and externally.

The southern cottage has a weather-board exterior and the northern cottage has a rendered (pebble-dash) exterior to a height of nearly 2 metres above which is weather-boarding. Both cottages still have their original wooden shingles under corrugated iron roofing.

It is clear that there were at least two extensive periods of alterations as well as many other minor modifications. The other identifiable periods are around 1900 (evidence for this is conjectural but based upon clear insertions of mouldings and other superficial additions fashionable at that time) and 1951/2 which is quoted by Rosemary Annable in her report of conversations obtained during her oral historical research.

Vegetation is climbing over some of the structure but this has been cut back and appears to be under control.

==== The Northern Cottage ====
===== Veranda =====
The veranda runs the length of the north and west walls for protection from the day and evening sun. Inspection in the roof adjacent void reveals that it was constructed at the same time as the cottage. The veranda roof is supported on squared and chamfered columns which rest at the base on the sandstone flags of the floor. Most of these flags have shifted and many have subsided lowering the height of the veranda in diverse places. At the north east corner a large old wisteria lies on the veranda roof in a picturesque manner which may become damaging if allowed to grow unchecked. The original shingles can be seen from the underside of the corrugated iron roof.

===== External walls =====
All the walls to this cottage appear to be timber slab (200-250mm, 8-10" wide), and where revealed by fallen internal plaster, show evidence of being painted with tar on the inside, which is unusual and the reason for this is not clear. Externally they have been covered with a hard cement based pebble-dash render. The external face of the northern wall under the veranda roof still has the splayed weatherboard lining on the upper section which almost certainly once covered the entire exterior.

The skillion section to the south side of the cottage shows evidence of originally having very low southern walls with a steeper roof above. A clear break in the render shows the earlier configuration.

===== Internal walls =====
The internal face of the walls have been lathed and plastered and then covered with layers of newspaper, wall paper and paint. some pieces of original wallpaper are exposed especially in Room 1 and the design suggests a date of about 1845–1855. The pattern is very similar to one produced by Richard Goodlad & Co., Newcastle upon Tyne in 1853. There is no evidence for an earlier finish on this plaster however it is possible that there was either an earlier plaster or no plaster on the walls before this.

The fireplace in Room 1 is original however the timber chimney piece appears to date from about 1900.

In Room 2 there is evidence of replastering and more layers of wallpaper dated to about 1860/70, 1900 (the room appears to have been papered twice), 1910/20 and again in the 1940s (from remnants of newspaper used to line the walls).

Room 3 has more recent plaster on all the walls appearing to date from c. 1950. The opening between Room 3 and 4 was obtained by removing a number of timber slabs and the architraving to the door suggests this opening to be around 1900. The door frame is old and may have come from elsewhere.

Room 4 is lined in masonite over studwork covering the slabs. This masonite is integrated with the kitchen fitout date to the early 1950s.

Room 5 has a stud frame over the timber slabs which was covered in masonite. Live termites were found next to the chimney breast (this was reported to both the Heritage Office and the Caretaker - March 2001). This wall covering and that in Room 6 is almost certainly part of the 1951/2 alterations. The partition between Rooms 4 and 5 is work of the 1951/2 alteration being a stud wall covered in masonite. These linings have also covered over the fireplace.

Room 7 - the lobby with external door to the now demolished covered way between the two cottages - shows evidence of the raised skillion roof. The decoration prior to the railing of the rook was a blue distemper while the last afterwards was wallpaper. Fragments of remaining paper are from the late 19th century known as "sanitary" paper with some later paper and frieze dating to around 1915–20.

Evidence on the external face of the wall, outside D9 suggest that the south end of this passage was modified, possible c. 1950 or earlier but the evidence is confusing.

===== Floors =====
Floors to room 1, 4 and 5 are timber. Rooms 2, 3, 6 and 7 are concrete.

===== Chimneys =====
The chimney in Room 1 is constructed of bricks (225 x 102 x 70 mm) of reasonably even texture and colour. It is dated at c. 1900, has the original fireplace complete with iron ware for cooking inside the chimney. It is constructed externally to the room. The chimney in Room 3 is constructed inside the room and the original wall was clearly altered to take account of this. The chimney in Room 5 has collapsed onto the skillion roof and consequently the structure leaks water badly.

===== Ceilings =====
All rooms, with the exception of room 1, have 150 mm-wide tongue-and-groove beaded ceiling timbers fixed directly to the underside of the joists. They are dated to about 1860/70. The timbers used in Room 1 are wider, approx. 200-250mm wide and are tongue and groove without any moulding at the joint.

===== Roof structure =====
The members are sawn timbers, the ceiling joists are connected to the wall plates by dovetail joints, the rafters are reverse birdsmouth jointed to the wall plates. Very few nails have been used in the structure. The top plate is 90 mm wide and construction is identical to the southern cottage. Roof shingles are missing over the skillion roof. The tops of the timber slabs of the partition walls are visible in the roof space.

The original roof covering was shingles. These remain intact except for the area where a skillion roof has been incorporated into the original. The entire roof is sheeted with corrugated iron. The skillion roof has a hipped return to the main wall and roof and is a later alteration construction at the time the skillion roof was raised.

===== Windows =====
Windows 1, 2 and 3 have pivot hinges on both sides of the openings. The window frame of no. 2 is original, had planted stops and originally no architrave. All these windows are infilled with glass louvres which are in very poor condition - mostly broken. They are now covered in a protective perspex sheet.

Windows 5, 6 and 7 have frames extending floor to ceiling, however only the top section is glazed. Window 4 is a small fixed glazed window.

===== Doors =====
Most door openings have ledged and braced doors with "tee" hinges and Norfolk latches, except the front door (D1) which is a door leaf of the 1960s. Graham Edds identified these as being made and installed in 1951-2 being modelled from one remaining beaded panelled door at that time. The replacement doors were framed with thinner than original timber panels.

Door openings 6 and 7 have the remains of two pivot hinges similar to those found in windows 1, 2 and 3.

Door 9 (in Room 7 - the external door) is a short door having been cut down from an earlier one.

===== Internal Timber Joinery =====
In Room 1 the skirtings and architraves are dated to 1900. The door frames are earlier. The hinges on the doors may be original

In Room 2 the door has early hinges, had a rim-lock and barrel bolt. The skirting in this room is also original.

Most of the doors have architraving dating to around 1900.

==== The Southern Cottage ====
===== External Walls =====
Room 8 is of timber slab construction sheeted externally with tapered weatherboards fixed horizontally. These are handsawn and thus may date as late as 1870 but are more likely to be pre-1860. There is a good deal of subsidence particularly in the north west corner. The walls have moved away from the chimney brickwork.

===== Internal Walls =====
This was clearly two rooms at one time as is clearly evident from the floorboards. A wall existed immediately to the west of the door openings and had a door in the centre.

The internal finish is a render of sand/mud consistency which is in good condition. There appears to be two periods of plastering. Newspaper dating Oct 7, 1956 is the first layer over the plaster. It is likely that the plastering, wallpapering and removal of the partition happened at the same time.

===== Fire Place and East Wall =====
The east wall is a sandstock brick wall containing a fireplace.

Externally the brickwork has been painted. The chimney above eaves level is missing and a skillion roof has been added to cover the flue. The south-east return of this fireplace wall has been infilled with an extra skin of brickwork. The lower bricks are modern common brick and above this sandstock bricks have been used.

Internally the wall has been finished with a sandy render. The firebox has been cement rendered.

===== Roof Structure and Covering =====
The members are pit-sawn timbers, the ceiling joists are notched over the wall plate and nailed while the rafters are reverse birdsmouth onto the wall plate. The timber shingles made from she-oak (Casuarina) are intact under a corrugated iron roof. At the western end of the roof, in the centre of the hip, the shingles are missing around what was a circular opening - possibly for a stove?

===== Floor =====
The floor is timber (5.5-6" boards) and in a poor state. There is some evidence of insect damaged, and along the north side the extreme floorboard is caught tight under the sinking wall. There is no evidence of a bottom wall plate here but there should have been one which has sunk into the ground or has rotted away. It shows evidence of the earlier dividing wall.

===== Ceiling =====
The ceiling finish is a vee-jointed tongue and groove fixed to the underside of squared ceiling joists. The joists are spaced at 800 mm centres. The joists to the east of the partition wall have been whitened, but not to the west of this division so there was clearly an early ceiling in the smaller, western space.

===== Windows =====
Windows 8 and 9 have 6 pane window sashes with evidence of sash flags dating of the early 20th century to an earlier design. Holes are evident in the jambs of both windows probably from pivot hinges used for early windows shutters which were probably of a single leaf.

===== Doors =====
The front door (D11) is ledged and sheeted with a mid-rail and mouldings of the 1820s (the Greek fillet which was still used in the 1840s although considered unfashionable by then). It has an old strap hinge and is set in a very old frame. It had a centre knob and knocker, a rim lock and barrel bolt.

Door 10 is a panelled door with a frieze rail hole and key hole on the right hand side.

Internal Joinery The skirting boards are 1890–1920.

Room 11 A later addition of a light timber frame covered in fibro. It contains a Hygeia Disolvenator. The date is unknown but it appears in some photographs taken in the 1940s or 50s.

Room 10 Also a light timber construction in poor condition. Date unknown.

Veranda A veranda of 1890-1920 which was still partially enclosed in 1982 runs along the south wall. The external walls have mostly disappeared. The bullnose corrugated iron roof is intact. The timber decking is very rotten

=== Condition ===
As at 29 January 2013, The Historic Houses Trust, under the Endangered Houses Fund program, has undertaken thorough conservation and repair works to both cottage buildings from 2008 through 2010.

A summary of the conservation works are detail in the 2012 Exeter Farm Conservation Management Plan.

Exeter Farm has been recognised by the National Trust in 2011 with the award for Conservation and Built Heritage for Projects under $1 million, Corporate /Government and by the Australian Institute of Architects (AIA), NSW Chapter, with the Greenway Award in 2012. The Greenway Award is the highest recognition awarded by the NSW chapter of the AIA for heritage projects.

Layers clearly evident. Fragile condition still preserves original structure and built elements.

=== Modifications and dates ===
Addition of main farmhouse c 1820. This extended c 1825 and verandah enclosed c 1860. Original cottage extended with concrete floors - date to be determined.

== Heritage listing ==
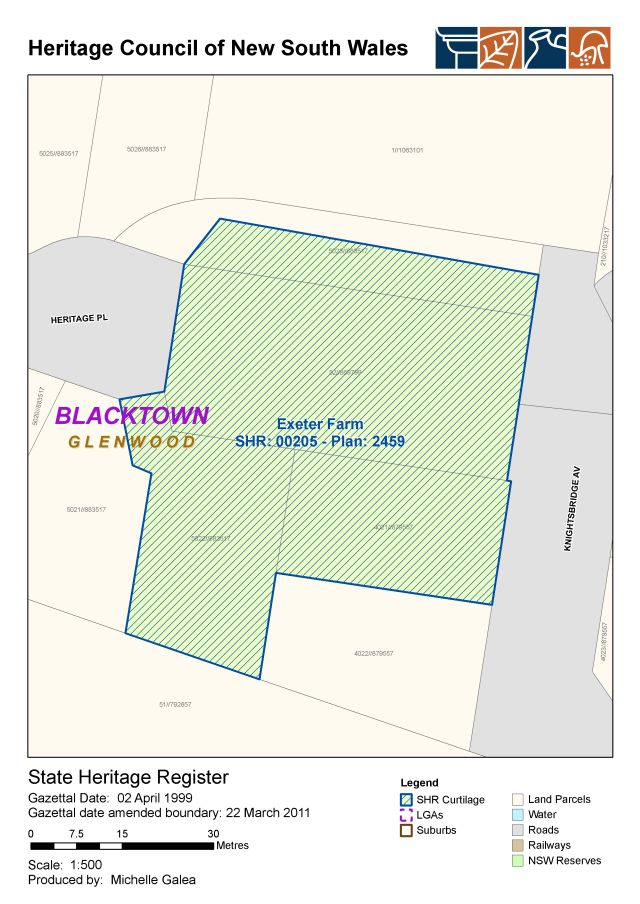
Heritage boundaries

Exeter Farm is a place of exceptional cultural significance at both local and state levels. It comprises a pair of rare, substantially intact and faithfully conserved, early 19th-century timber slab cottages within the remnants of its original landscape and setting. This setting includes mature trees and other planting, remnant farm structures, original entry drive and remnant farm fencing. It retains evidence of its approximately 150 years of rural use, including some archaeological evidence. The extended curtilage of this item ensures a buffer between the item and nearby real estate development and reinstates and protects some of the landscape setting and significant views to and from the item.

Exeter Farm dates from the first European settlement of the area and associations with the seminal years of agricultural development in New South Wales. The settlement of Exeter Farm is dated from the Macquarie land grant to Daniel Brien of 1921.

The cottages are rare in a metropolitan setting and substantially intact examples of vernacular timber slab construction, with evidence of an unusually sophisticated level of construction and finish. Their form and small scale is representative of cottages erected from the 1790s to the end of the Macquarie period and to a lesser extent to the 1840s. This form and construction of cottage, once common in the areas of early European rural settlement, is now extremely rare. These are the only surviving examples of their type in the Blacktown Municipality and one of a few in a densely populated metropolitan area in NSW. Recent conservation works have indicated the construction of the cottages dates from around the 1850s but were constructed utilising techniques employed in the construction of utilitarian timber farm building from the 1790s to the mid to late years of the 19th Century.

The late 1990s subdivision and suburban development of the original farm area has had a substantial impact on the setting of the cottages, and thus their aesthetic significance and ability to demonstrate this, but not on their technical or historic values. The extension of the curtilage for this item ensures that some semblance of its former rural setting and significant views to and from the item are retained.

Exeter Farm was listed on the New South Wales State Heritage Register on 2 April 1999 having satisfied the following criteria.

The place is important in demonstrating the course, or pattern, of cultural or natural history in New South Wales.

Exeter farm with its two farm dwellings is of State heritage significance as a rare example of simple, utilitarian 19th century vernacular farm dwellings in the Metropolitan setting which have survived in their original layout. While there are other examples of timber slab cottages and other agricultural buildings still in their rural setting, there are very few surviving in the metropolitan area.

The design and construction of the buildings reflects that utilised in the construction of similar buildings across the Cumberland Plain as it was settled in the early years of the 19th Century. This was a highly significant period in the history of New South Wales and the settlement of the farm is dated to the Macquarie land grant to Daniel Brien of 1821. Although not definitely dated the farm dwellings were occupied until 1976 and thus represent at least 150 years of occupation. The cottages are relatively intact and substantially unaltered.

While rural setting of the Exeter Farm cottages has been inevitably altered by the tide of development that has swept the Blacktown area, the extended curtilage ensures that some semblance of its former rural setting and significant views to and from the item are retained.

The historical significance of Exeter Farm at a State level is strengthened by the fact that the buildings were one of the first property purchases made by the Endangered Houses Fund. This program was set up by the Historic Houses Trust in 2001 to fund the purchase and restoration or endangered historic houses which are then onsold to recoup costs. Over 300 projects have been funded through this scheme.

The place has potential to yield information that will contribute to an understanding of the cultural or natural history of New South Wales.

Exeter Farm, including the intact and fully conserved farm dwellings are of State significance for their potential to demonstrate construction techniques, materials and finishes employed in early to mid-19th-century vernacular farm buildings.

Exeter Farm and its extended setting may reveal evidence of early domestic agricultural use although recent conservation works have already yielded archaeological potential in the underfloor area of the house.

The place possesses uncommon, rare or endangered aspects of the cultural or natural history of New South Wales.

Exeter farm with its two farm dwellings is of State heritage significance as a rare example of simple, utilitarian 19th century vernacular farm dwellings in a metropolitan setting which have survived in their original layout. While there are other examples of timber slab cottages and other agricultural buildings still in their rural setting, there are few surviving in the metropolitan area. They are a rare demonstration of timber dwelling construction techniquies and materials of the early 19th century still surviving in the now urban environment .

The place is important in demonstrating the principal characteristics of a class of cultural or natural places/environments in New South Wales.

Exeter Farm is a representative example of vernacular timber constructed rural dwellings which would have covered the Cumberland Plain during the early years of the 19th century which was a significant phase in the population settlement and development of NSW. It also represents 150 years of continuous occupation as ordinary farm dwellings.
