= Dayton House, Seven Hills =

Dayton House
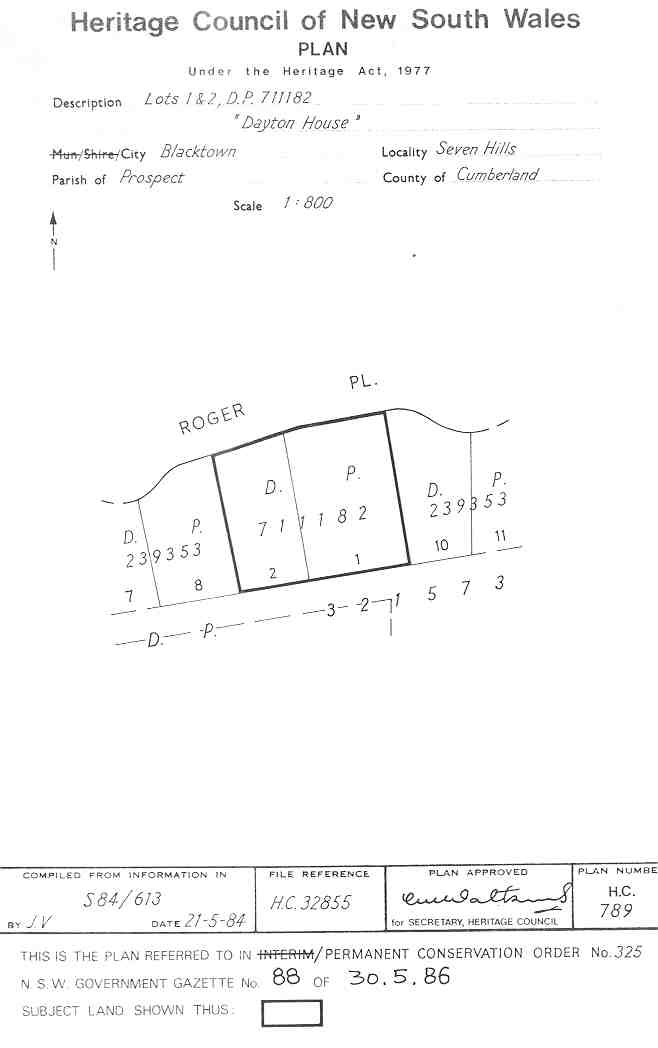
- Heritage boundaries

- Location within Sydney
- 33°47′07″S 150°55′20″E
- Location: 37-39 Roger Place, Seven Hills, City of Blacktown, New South Wales, Australia

History
- Built: 1834

New South Wales Heritage Register
- Official name: Dayton House; Bates Farm
- Type: state heritage (built)
- Designated: 2 April 1999
- Reference no.: 325
- Type: House
- Category: Residential buildings (private)

Dayton House is a heritage-listed farm house at 37-39 Roger Place, Seven Hills, New South Wales, a suburb of Sydney, Australia. It was built in 1834. It is also known as Bates Farm. It was added to the New South Wales State Heritage Register on 2 April 1999.

== History ==
Bates Farm is situated on land originally granted to a Lewis Henry Campbell. The grant measured 120 acres in area.

Campbell subsequently sold the land to James Bates in September, 1827. At that time the land was described as being separate from the Prospect common by the new road to Richmond and backed by the grants of William Hill and George Parsley on the Seven Hills road side and on the other side by a then unlocated piece of land.

Bates, a convict, had arrived in Sydney on the Grenada in October 1819. He had been convicted in London in 1818 of stealing twenty eight yards of cotton valued at one pound, ten shillings from a Thomas Garner. Bates was sentenced to seven years transportation, he was then aged 20 years and a labourer by profession.

From 1821, Bates was residing at Parramatta. In early December of that year he had been granted permission to marry an Elizabeth Alcock. Bates' occupation during this period was described as a labourer and he had been attached to the Government lumberyard. By early 1824, Bates had been assigned a convict mechanic. From this period his occupation was described as a nailor residing at Parramatta.

In the Census return for 1828 Bates' 120 acres at Prospect was described as comprising 60 acres of cleared land and 10 acres under cultivation. He also had three horses and 16 head of cattle. Bates' family at that time comprised his wife, Elizabeth. aged 31 years; Abraham J., aged four years; James (junior), aged two years; and Isaac, D., aged four months. Bates was residing at Prospect.

In March. 1829 Bates formally warned trespassers off his farm by giving notice: "...that any Person or Persons found Trespassing on any land, in the district of Prospect, after this date, will be prosecuted according to law. - Bounded on one side by Mr William Smith; on the other by the Seven Hills Road; on the other by T.H. Campbell; and on the other by Mr Gastrides Farm; as the same is my property."

In May 1829 James Bates also purchased 154 acres of farm land from John Liquorish for the sum of £350. This land is separate from the subject property and was located in Seven Hills.

In about 1830 the New Richmond road which provided a more direct line to Richmond between the Great Western Road and the Windsor Road was made. This road which is now known in part as the Blacktown Road passed through Bates' land. In September 1830 Bates then residing at Prospect unsuccessfully sought compensation from the government either through provision of fencing or additional land. Bates continued this correspondence in 1831 requesting the road be marked off from his estate and again in 1833.

In June, 1831, Bates sought from the government the title deeds to his land. 14 This was eventually undertaken in August. 1834. The Government Gazette giving notice that: "James Bates, resident at Prospect, parish of Prospect, County of Cumberland, in said colony, farmer, to 120 acres of land, described as follows: situate in the County of Cumberland, the parish of Prospect, bounded on the north by a line west 28 chains, commencing at Rowe's southeast corner, on the west by the Richmond-road; on the south by a line east 30 chains; and on the east by the road to Prospect. "

By November, 1834 Bates had died.

The planning and fabric of the subject building suggests that by the time of Bates death the building had been completed. However, whether the building faced the line of the present Blacktown Road or Seven Hills Road has not been determined.

James Bates died intestate, 17 but the property was evidently passed onto James Bates Junior, although at the time of his father's death he would have been about eight years of age.

The intestate estate of James Bates was caught up in the John Edye Manning affair. Manning who was the Registrar of the Supreme Court of New South Wales and the curator of intestate estates, became insolvent in 1841 - a victim of the serious financial depression afflicting the colony at the time. As Curator, Manning was required to deposit intestate monies in the Savings Bank, but about £10,000 of trust money was not lodged as such. Manning having kept it in the same account as his own money. In January 1841, The Registrar of Supreme Court reported that the Bates Receipt valued £1333, but the Balance was £1003. By August 1844, a claim against Manning was made and finally in 1846 £1003 was recovered by the family.

James Bates Junior married a Sarah Ivory in about 1848. Sarah was born at Eastern Creek c.1826, the daughter of Charles Ivory, farmer. James and Sarah subsequently had three daughters: Elizabeth Ann, born 8/4/1853; Emily Ann, born 8/10/1855; and Alice Selina Ann born 24/3/1858.

During the 1850s James Bates Junior is registered on the electoral rolls as being at Prospect.

From August 1864 the 110 acre property then known as "Bates Farm" with "buildings thereon" was leased to an Edward Moon of Prospect, farmer. The farm "situated at Prospect on the Richmond Road" was at that the time in the occupation of Bates. The lease was for 10 years, with a £40 per annum rental.

During this period and for some after, the electoral rolls recorded Bates as having resided at Richmond (1871 to 1874), and Sydney (1876 to c.1890). However, from about 1891 Bates was again residing at Prospect.

By the terms of his Will, the subject property passed to his wife, Sarah. Sarah Bates died in July, 1909, at the age of 83 years. She died at "Prospect Cottage", in Railway Street, Petersham.

The subject property at this time came into possession as trustees of Sarah's daughter, Emily Ann Harris of Glebe Point, and Sarah's grandson. Harold James Cofill of Forest Lodge, grazier. In October 1912 the property was sold to Mildred Ethel Harris of Glebe Point spinster for £1210.

A mortgage was subsequently undertaken with Sir James Reading Fairfax for the value of £3000. This included other lands in Prospect, Blacktown and Ultimo.

The physical evidence suggests minor alterations were undertaken at this time the most being the addition of the store.

Harris subsequently defaulted on the mortgage and the 100 acre property was ubdivided and sold in February 1922 by the trustees of Sir James Reading Fairfax. The subject property now comprising the house and an allotment measuring 7 acres 2 roods and 13 3/4 in area was sold to Stanley Eric Speare of Castle Hill, saw mill proprietor and Florence Harriet May Stedman. Speare also purchased adjoining land on the north, south and east. The land title was converted to Torrens title at this time.

To what use the property was made of during this period is not currently understood. The land may have been logged and or used as a poultry farm. No alterations appear to have been undertaken to the house.

The land was again subdivided and sold in 1926-1928 to a Samuel Frederick Gray of Sydney, biochemist and his wife Jessie Frederick. The allotment area was again reduced to 6 acres, 2 roods and 24 1/2 perches. In November 1931 it was sold to Ella Grovers, wife of Henry William Grovers of Prospect, gentleman and in May 1935 sold to Olive May Grigg (later Skaines) of Epping, widow.

The physical evidence suggests that a number of alterations were made at this time. These included the upper and lower lounge and bedroom.

In May 1950 the property was sold to Adair MacAlister Blain of Prospect, surveyor. In September 1952 it was again subdivided into an allotment of 3 acres and 23 1/4 perches in area and subsequently sold to Mary Gloria Patricia Buchanan of Cattai, musician. In April 1958 it was sold to Antal Galambos of Blacktown, bricklayer.

During this period substantial alterations to the house were undertaken giving it the form it has today.

In 1967 the property was sold to Meadow Park Pty Ltd. The land was subsequently subdivided into 15 allotments which also included Roger Place. The subject property became Lot 9 which comprised 1 rood and 18 1/2 perches in area.

In 1982 Dayton House was offered for sale and concern was expressed for the future of the building with possible demolition. A section 130 order was placed over the property on 30 July 1982. An Interim Conservation Order was placed over the property on 10 August 1984. A Commission of Inquiry was held in early 1985.

In 1985 Lot 9 was further subdivided into two lots by the owners Mr and Mrs Kayes.

Following representations by the owner and doubts over the significance and age of the building the Interim Conservation Order was revoked and the proposed Permanent Conservation Order was not proceeded with. However, in late 1985 circumstances changed where a new owner purchased the property and new information came forward indicating that the building could have been built as early as the 1830s.

Through the heritage Incentives program a $ for $ amount was granted to the new owner to purchase the adjoining vacant subdivided block critical as part of the garden curtilage.

A Permanent Conservation Order was placed over the property on 3 May 1986. It was transferred to the State Heritage Register on 2 April 1999.

== Description ==
Bates Farm is the archetypal two-storeyed verandahed late-Georgian house as built in Australia. The building suggests a date of about the early 1830s. While subsequently altered by later occupants, during the Bates period the house would have been three bays wide in a double-pile plan form. The elevations would have centered on the central doorway, balanced by dominant chimneys.

The house has a corrugated iron hipped roof, boxed timber eaves, guttering and linings which appear between the wars, or possibly post war. The four chimneys are brick without caps and are the only exterior part of the building that has not been roughcast. The north east chimney is the largest on the house and indicates that it once had two flues. The room upstairs on this corner is the only first floor room with a fireplace.

The remainder of the brick walls from eaves to ground are roughcast, which would suggest post war. There is evidence all the way round the house of an encircling ground floor verandah presumably similar to that on the southern side. There are five stone sills/masonry sills at first floor level which appear to be original, three in the east elevation and two in the west elevation. All the ground floor apertures appear originally to have been french doors. The verandah between the lower kitchen and the store room is of the same construction as the southern verandah and this verandah also apparently once wrapped right around the house. On the west front is a porch or porte-cochere again finished in roughcast and with pipe railings. The staircase to the upper flat would appear to be more recent than the rest.

There is the feeling that the house may have originally faced the east rather than the west as at present because the staircase which is now closed off comes down in the central hall.

On the southern side of the house is a concave corrugated iron sheet on timber frame verandah without supports which is probably late Victorian. The same verandah is between the kitchen and store. The timber posts are post war but most of the framing is probably post war. The concrete floor is probably post war or could be between the wars.

The kitchen and bathroom skillion on the east wall appears to be post war, whereas the store at the north east corner appears to be either Edwardian or between the wars. Both features are roughcast and the roofing is corrugated iton.

Behind the house to the east there are a number of False Acacias and Oleanders. There is also a Wisteria growing against the southern verandah and a mature Lilly Pilly. On what might have been the front lawn area there are two mature Lagerstroemias and two mature Cypress pines. There is also a rubber tree off the north east corner of the house by the store.

Whilst there is no direct evidence to confirm it, it is probable that Bates Farm was an orchard.

== Heritage listing ==
Bates Farm, possibly built in the early 1830s, is arguably the oldest extant domestic farm building in the Blacktown area. Albeit substantially altered, the house in its planning is an example of the archetypal verandahed two storeyed, double-pile late-Georgian house as built in rural Australia. The place is associated with James Bates, a successful ex-convict settler, whose family retained an interest in the Blacktown area for at least one hundred years. (Clive Lucas Stapleton, 1993)

Dayton House was listed on the New South Wales State Heritage Register on 2 April 1999 having satisfied the following criteria.

The place is important in demonstrating the course, or pattern, of cultural or natural history in New South Wales.

The place is a typical example of the European development of the Blacktown area in its development from initial agricultural use to suburban subdivisions.

The place has a strong or special association with a person, or group of persons, of importance of cultural or natural history of New South Wales's history.

The place is associated with James Bates a successful ex-convict settler, whose family retained an interest in the Blacktown area for at least one hundred years.

The place is important in demonstrating aesthetic characteristics and/or a high degree of creative or technical achievement in New South Wales.

The place contains a number of planting which are some age, and possibly associated with the Bates period of ownership.

The place has potential to yield information that will contribute to an understanding of the cultural or natural history of New South Wales.

The place contains a building which has high archaeological potential to reveal new information about early nineteenth century farm buildings.
