= Grantham Poultry Research Station =

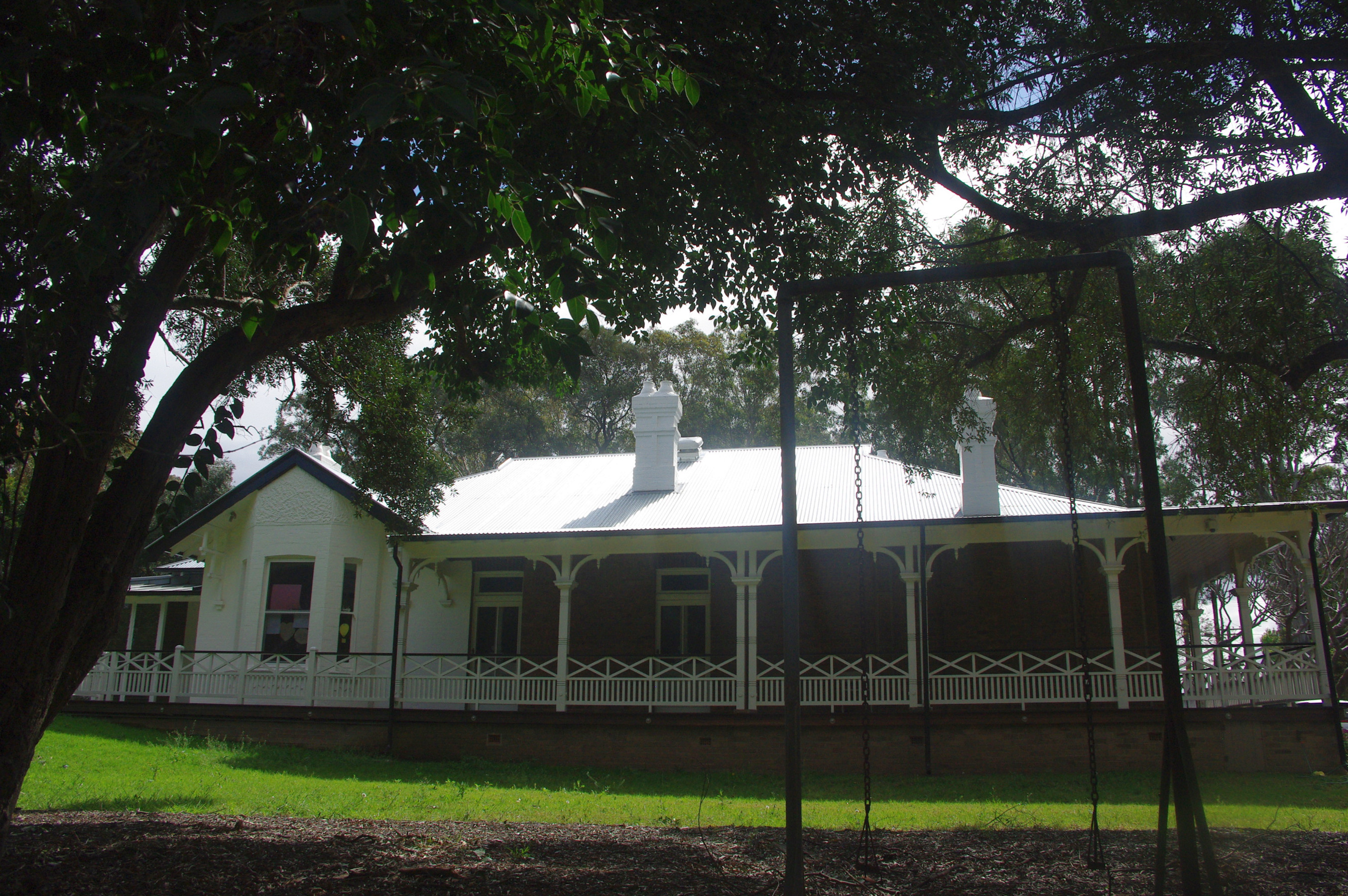
- "Melrose" in 2015

- Location within Sydney
- 33.7811°S 150.9296°E
- Location: 71 Seven Hills Road, Seven Hills, City of Blacktown, New South Wales, Australia

History
- Built: 1897–1939

Site notes
- Architect(s): Admin Bldg: Ted Turner/Government Architect's Office; Melrose: Byera Hadley
- Owner: NSW Department of Primary Industries

New South Wales Heritage Register
- Official name: Grantham Poultry Research Station (former); Seven Hills Agricultural Station; Grantham State Poultry Farm; Melrose; Administration Building
- Type: state heritage (landscape)
- Designated: 7 April 2000
- Reference no.: 1382
- Type: Other – Landscape – Cultural
- Category: Landscape – Cultural

The Grantham Poultry Research Station is a heritage-listed former poultry farm and research station and now heritage reserve at 71 Seven Hills Road, Seven Hills, City of Blacktown, New South Wales, Australia. It includes two historic residences, Melrose and Drumtochty. The site is today known as the Grantham Heritage Park, and has previously been known as Seven Hills Agricultural Station and the Grantham State Poultry Farm. It was built from 1897 to 1939. It was added to the New South Wales State Heritage Register on 7 April 2000.

== History ==
=== Seven Hills area ===
This area was first settled when Matthew Pearce, a free settler who arrived on board the Surprise in 1794, was granted 160 acres in 1795. He named it Kings Langley after an English village of that name, about 30 km south of London; it is believed that Pearce was born in the manor house in that village. The grant was bounded by the present Old Windsor Road, Seven Hills Road, Chapel Lane (Baulkham Hills) and Toongabbie Creek. Because his family could see seven hills from their home, the area became known as Seven Hills, a title it has borne since 1800.

Pearce was interred at St. John's Cemetery, Parramatta but later his remains were removed. Today Pearce and his family lie in a private cemetery which his descendants set up at the corner of Seven Hills Road and Old Windsor Road (facing Bella Vista Farm, which belonged for much of the 19th century to the Pearce family).

In the early years of the 20th century there was a small village in the area. A tileworks was established c. 1900 and continued for about 60 years. A Department of Agriculture Poultry Research Station was established in 1939 on the site that had formerly been Grantham poultry farm before 1914. Nearby Grantham High School is on land that was also formerly part of the Pearce estate.

=== Grantham Poultry Research Station ===
The earliest European record of this site (of Grantham Poultry Research Station (former)) was as part of the Cumberland Plain set aside for use as Prospect Common by Governor Phillip Gidley King in 1804. Most of this land was vegetated by Cumberland Plain Woodland eucalypt forest and at this time was occupied by the Dharug Aboriginal people. King appointed John Nichols, James Cleaver and William Kentwell as trustees of the Common, which extended over most of what is now Blacktown.

The original grants that made up what is now Grantham were made to Samuel Haynes – 50 acres and Samuel Dent – 50 acres. These two lots fronted onto Seven Hills Road, a route that still displays its early establishment as an important transport link by following the line of high ground between the Windsor Road (now Old Windsor Road) and Prospect). Lots 104 and 105 were surrounded by grants to William Hill – 80 acres; John Stephenson – 50 acres; John Leadbetter – 60 acres; and James Ridley – 50 acres.

A railway link built by 1863 from Parramatta to Penrith and including Seven Hills railway station, stimulated development of the area into a prosperous orcharding district, which, during the land boom of the 1880s, soon became intensive farmlets. The property from which the Research Station has taken its name seems to have been established c.1888 as a working farm of around 100 acres.

By 1897 the two 50-acre lots (owned by Samuel Haynes) were owned by solicitor William Chadwick, who built a substantial out of town residence called Melrose designed by architect Byera Hadley. Hadley at that time was assistant teacher of architectural drawing at Sydney Technical College. Melrose was completed by June 1897.

Hadley became one of the leading architects of his day, responsible for Wesley College at the University of Sydney; Willoughby Town Hall and several large warehouse developments in the centre of Sydney that are recognised as architecturally significant. In 1914 he was appointed Lecturer-in-Charge of the Department of Architecture at Sydney Technical College. His interest in architectural education led to establishment of a travelling scholarship in his name that is now considered one of NSW's most prestigious architectural awards. The house is roughly symmetrical with main entrance at right angles to Seven Hills Road. Curved stairs approach the front door. The circular driveway appears to have been part of Hadley's original plan and is consistent with the place's original use as a "country residence".

Melrose became the Manager's Residence with establishment of the Grantham Poultry Stud in 1901.

Francis Martin of Martin & Co. in Meadowbank acquired the property on 30 July 1906 from John Harbone who had combined the properties in 1901 and called it Grantham Poultry Stud, using it to test agricultural machinery.

By 1912 the property was managed by James Hadlington who had an interest in poultry farming. Later that year he was appointed State Poultry Expert for the Department of Agriculture. Hadlington published a number of articles on poultry farming, including topics such as setting up a farm, feed, breeding and buildings. It would appear that he experimented with these concepts both at Grantham and Hawkesbury Agricultural College where he conducted research.

Photographs of the area dated 1912–1917 show a predominance of fruit orchards on adjoining properties. Around the same time a Foreman's Cottage was built on the peak of the hill on the western corner of the then site.

In 1917 the "Returned Soldiers Settlement Scheme" was established by the Department of Lands and involved the provision of farmlets for returned soldiers. Hadlington nominated the Seven Hills site as a property on which a state poultry farm could operate, with the surplus area subdivided into poultry farmlets for returned servicemen. The idea was accepted and the property purchased from Martin and Co. The property was subdivided into eleven 5 acre lots, 16 house lots, and the balance as the "Grantham State Poultry Farm".

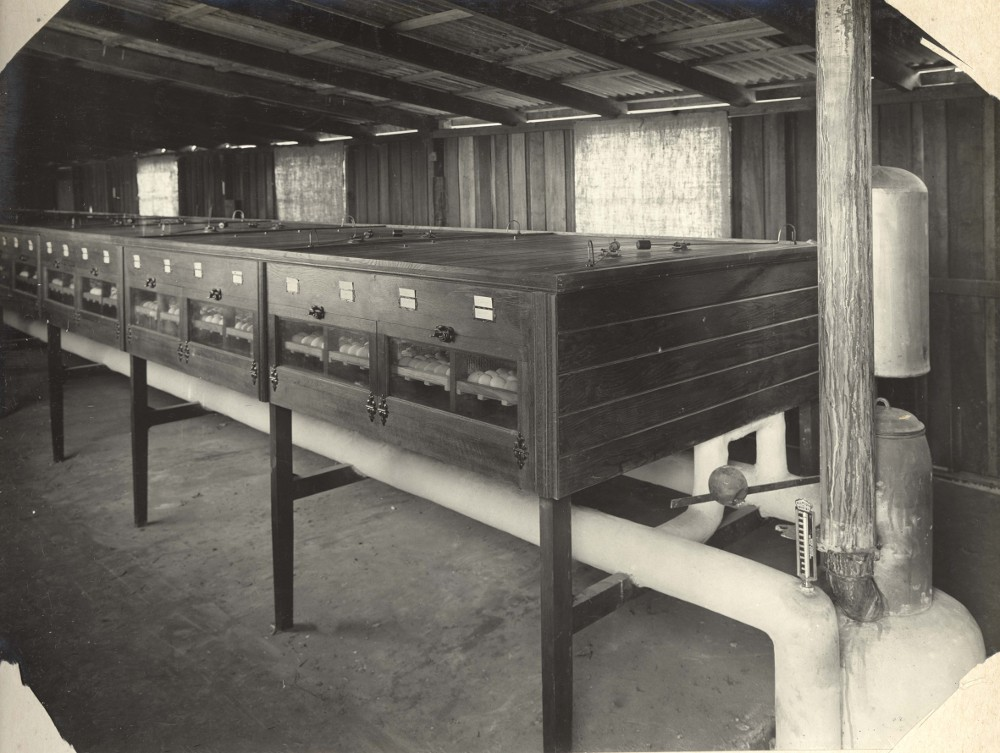
Incubator house, Grantham Stud Poultry Farm, 1921

The Grantham State Poultry Farm operated as a breeding farm to provide stock for returned soldiers' farms throughout New South Wales, and also arranged the bulk purchase of feed and supplies for the surrounding 11 farms.

In 1917–1918 the Bachelors Quarters, comprising 12 cubicles for trainees, accommodation for the cook, a dining room, kitchen, shower, and conveniences. was built near the top of the property. Photographs indicate that prior to this trainees slept in tents. The Bachelors Quarters have since been demolished.

A series of dirt roads led to the 11 farms. On each of the farms, weatherboard cottages wore built with a gable roof and small front verandah. Poultry sheds and yards were in close proximity to the cottages.

The farms scheme for returned soldiers proved unsuccessful; the small holdings were generally unworkable, and the soldiers were largely untrained thus finding it difficult to make a living.

In the early 1920s the Returned Soldiers Settlement Scheme was being disbanded and the various properties disposed of. In 1923 the Under Minister for Lands advised the Minister for Agriculture that Grantham Stud Poultry Farm was no longer required for the settlement of returned soldiers, and that alternatively it may be suitable as a demonstration farm operated by the department. On 4 August 1923 the property, comprising.,46 acres 3 roods and 4 perches and valued at 9000 pounds including buildings, stock and plant, was transferred to the Department of Agriculture.

In 1924 there were approximately 2,000 poultry farms within a 50-mile radius from Grantham. Hadlington noted that two-thirds of these farms were sub-standard, indicating the need for Grantham to establish itself as the model poultry farm. At this time, feed experiments were conducted on the property.

Grantham continued as the "Government Poultry Farm" until 1939, with poultry stock, day-old chicks, and eggs for sale to the public. After 1939, the Department of Agriculture agreed that feed would continue to be distributed to private poultry farms as well as those of the returned soldiers. This was later phased out.

During 1923–1939, a new office building, machinery and feed room, and brooder houses were built on the site, and old brooder houses, a corn cracker, incubator, feed room, and building were demolished.

=== NSW Department of Agriculture: Poultry Experiment Farm, Seven Hills, 1939+ ===
In 1939 the main function of the farm changed from commercial breeding and sales to experimental work aimed at improving the quality of the poultry industry. The farm was renamed "Poultry Experiment Farm, Seven Hills".

c. 1946, the Australian Poultry Industry was in crisis due to low hatchability. The NSW Agriculture Department was asked to investigate the problem. Research undertaken at the Experiment Farm found vitamin B2 and manganese deficiencies in feed contributed to low hatchability. These findings saved the poultry industry from major financial loss. It also brought international acclaim and established the estate as one of the top six poultry research centres in the world.

Further research by Malcolm McDonald, Bert Sheridan and Bob Pym had international influence and greatly enhanced the Australian Poultry Industry. Experiment work continued through the 1940s, including research into nutrition, broiler diets, genetics and poultry management. In 1960, in recognition of the work conducted on the property, the name changed to "Poultry Research Station".

=== Poultry Research Station, c. 1959 – 1988 ===
In 1959, Cumberland County Council rezoned adjoining land to the east and south from "Green Belt" to residential. The close proximity of dwellings made it difficult to operate the farm effectively. New laboratories and offices were built 1958–1960 and the name changed to "Poultry Research Station". In 1959, Cumberland County Council rezoned adjoining land to east and south to residential. New dwellings nearby made it difficult to operate the farm. Plans were drawn up 1968–1969 by the Government Architect's Office under E. H. (Ted) Farmer, roughly contemporaneous with Sydney University's Fisher Library and Chemistry Building, additions to the Art Gallery of New South Wales, all considered fine examples of the new humanism of Scandinavian architectural design. This was a time when the NSW Government Architect's office was an Australian leader in institutional design. Green and Knight documented the building. Construction was completed by 1971. This allowed extension officers previously located at Parramatta to move to Seven Hills and provided them with up-to-date office, training, library and laboratory facilities.

The property was renamed in 1981 as the "Poultry Research and Advisory Station". The name was again changed in 1983 to "Agricultural Station, Seven Hills". The property wound down in 1988 and the site was declared surplus by the Department of Agriculture and available for disposal.

A proposed road deviation through the western portion of the site has been mooted since at least 1984.

At some time presumably since 1988, the following buildings formerly on the site have been demolished:

- Motor Vehicle Depot Workshop (built late 1900s)
- Foreman's Cottage (pre-1925)
- Vehicle Storage Shed (c. 1970)
- Annex Office (c. 1939)
- Farm Mess Room (c. 1962)
- Chemical Store (1980s)
- Brooder House (c. 1937)
- Lands Department Workshop (1980s–1990s)
- Hatchery (1937–1939)
- Random Sample Layer test Shed (1970s)
- ES RSLT Rearing Shed (1970–1980)
- Machinery Sheds (1950s–1960s)
- DI Layer Shed (1950s)
- Rearing Pens (c. 1950)
- Layer Shed A1 (c. 1970)

Between 1984 and 1987 the station underwent its final functional transformations. Proposed road widening of Seven Hills Road led to sale of declared surplus land and relocation to the rear of the site of the cottage, Drumtochty. Drumtochty was originally built c. 1890 – 1900, originally located on Seven Hills Road at what is now the corner with Australorp Avenue. It was altered in 1966 before being relocated to its present site in 1984 in anticipation of a proposed road widening of Seven Hills Road. At that time it underwent substantial refurbishment to reverse its layout such that the original rear entrance is now the front door. From 1986 it was used as part of the central Motor Vehicle Depot (relocated from Glenfield) before becoming a caretaker's residence.

By 1987 the sale of surplus land had been effected and in 1988 the station's activities were wound down, the site being formally declared surplus by the Department of Agriculture. Demolition of several buildings to reduce maintenance costs quickly followed.

=== 1988–present: subdivision and change of uses ===
By 1989, much of the original site was largely subdivided into residential lots.

Since 1991 a number of buildings have been demolished leaving only six significant structures on the site and their outbuildings:

- Melrose and Drumtochty residences and outbuildings;
- the Administration building;
- the old feed shed;
- the switchboard and cleaner store; and
- a workshop identified in 1962 as the meat meal research room.

Since 1991 the site has remained largely unused except for informal activities by nearby residents and maintenance of the road reserve by a community group the Friends of Grantham.

In 2002 agreement was reached between Blacktown City Council and the Department of Agriculture to purchase the entire remaining site and its buildings.

The War Memorial on the site of the proposed road deviation on Lot 4 and built by the Friends of Grantham, is of recent construction and comprises a bolted "box" framework of recycled timber set into a mosaic-tiled concrete base. The structure was designed by Simon Cook of Design Rhetoric and the tiling carried out by the Ceramics Research Centre of UWS under the direction of Michael Keighery. It is on the site of the former Bachelors' Quarters, the small brick footings for which can be seen under the grass cover in the vicinity. It was built to commemorate the returned soldiers who settled on the site as part of the soldier-settlement scheme.

Council acquired the property from the NSW Department of Agriculture in 2004. Since acquisition Council has recognised the opportunities the site provides as a unique community resource. A sustainability education centre will be developed in the refurbished former Administration Building. This building will also accommodate family day care administration offices.

Council has prepared a master plan for the Grantham Heritage Precinct site (now known as the Grantham Heritage Parkland) focussing on the future uses of the site and on sustainability. The masterplanning process has considered the objectives of sustainability, heritage and "city garden" for the future use and development of the site, and provides guidance for the sites long-term development directions. The plan takes a staged approach starting with the former Administration building, then Melrose cottage precinct, then the central parkland, then the lower paddock and lastly the adjoining open space areas to the south (Environmental Partnership (NSW) et al., 2008, 8,11).

=== Modifications and dates ===
- c. 1897 Melrose built
- 1901 two properties combined by Harbone and used to test agricultural machinery
- 1912+ James Hadlington using Grantham as research facility for experiments with poultry
- 1917 photo shows much of surrounding area covered by newly established orchards, including orange orchards. The site is shown as largely cleared with only remnant trees retained across most of the site. Another 1917 photo shows Melrose with a rear addition with a steep-pitched gable roof and verandah – this is now removed.
- 1917+ Grantham likely used as Returned Soldier Settlement Scheme training facility and partially cooperative settlement – site subdivided into twelve 5 acre lots and 16 house lots. A section was excised to provide for improved road access to Seven Hills Road, the rest becoming known as Grantham State Poultry Farm. Site laid out with a number of breeding sheds and runs, crop plantings (oats, lucerne), dams were sunk along small streams on the property. The Soldier Settlement farms comprised small clapboard residences with a simple gable roof and front porch in one corner set on brick pier footings. Each consisted of four basic rooms, some with a lean-to addition at the rear. Many appear to have been located immediately adjacent to poultry sheds and runs, fronting onto dirt roads. Photos indicate basic accommodations in a largely treeless expanse of bare earth. Some settlers managed to establish a modest garden setting for some residences. Several of these dwellings remain in Grantham Road.
- 1917-18 Bachelors' Quarters erected replacing the earlier tent encampment – on an area along Seven Hills Road, which then retained a light tree cover and natural grasslands. A small building in the tent encampment with a chimney may have been a toilet block or kitchen facility. The bachelors' quarters was a timber-framed weatherboard dormitory, with verandahs on two sides and an enclosure on the north-east corner for the kitchen. It had 12 cubicles for trainees, accommodation for the cook, a dining room, shower and toilets. Apart from the main residence Melrose, this was the most substantial building on the site. 1926 photos show it was located on the hill of the western corner of the site, not far from the Seven Hills Road boundary where the memorial is now sited.
- 1923 approval for transfer to Department of 46 acre 3 rood 4 perchase property (c.18.93ha). An inventory of that time showed c.55acres of land (22.26ha) including 16 building allotments fronting Seven Hills Road; buildings including 3 cottages; barracks; plant; stock. Before transfer the property was reduced to 42 acres (c.17ha) and revalued. Buildings and facilities on the site included: manager's residence; foreman's cottage; stables and loft; incubator; feed room; office; barracks; brooder pens (2); cold brooder; weaner pens; rearing pens; general purpose houses; colony enclosures; adulat poultry houses; cockerel pens; single pens; & a corn cracker. An early 1920s site plan and 1923 photographs showed some of the station was under cultivation with paddocks of lucerne, presumably as stock feed.
- 1924-7 several unwanted blocks of land sold off. Following transfer of property to Department of Agriculture, 1.5 acres was sold bordering the property to the northeast. A 1925 plan showed a foreman's cottage on Seven Hills Road and the barracks within the area now known as Lot 4.
- 1927 block 245 bordering Grantham to the east (5 acres) sold (previously leased) including a cottage, barn and dam. By then there were no longer cattle on the site, and other farm-related uses had been phased out by 1927 prior to transfer to the Department of Agriculture.
- 1927-39 several buildings added to site and some were demolished, including:
- 1937 new office building, machinery and feed room, 2 brooder houses; and demolition of old machinery and feed room, old brooder houses, corn cracker, incubator and feed room (no date known).
- 1940s a series of upgrades in research facilities, including 1943 new laying house and pens; 1950 intensive pens for breeding
- early 1950s several new land acquisitions made in response to station's expanded role and international profile.
- 1951 16.28 acres acquired from Portion 103;
- 1952 Lot 1 on Seven Hills Road acquired from Housing Commission for an additional residence. Construction stopped and this lot was resold.
- 1958 new laboratories and officers added to existing building; new poultry range house, new broiler house and silos (1959).
- 1959 rezoning of land adjoining the station to the east and south from "Green Belt" to residential, producing a significant change to the site and context, making it increasingly difficult to operate the station with adjoining residences.
- 1966-71 plans for and construction of a new Administration/office building, allowing extension officers from Parramatta to relocate and have new office, training, library and laboratory facilities.
- 1975 new building built on eastern periphery of site to house the Random Mayer Sample Test
- 1982 major restructure and gradual phasing out of research. Property reduced to 5.5ha/13.6 acres. A number of structures were demolished and the Random Layer Sample Test was relocated.
- 1983 old office upgraded to house meat inspectors and prickly pear officers.
- 1984–7 final functional transformation of the station. Proposed road widening of Seven Hills Road led to sale of declared surplus land and relocation to the rear of the site of Drumtochty cottage, originally part of Portion 103 acquired in 1951. From 1986 part of the cottage used as part of central Motor Vehicle Depot, to which a service building was added in 1986, located adjacent.
- 1987 surplus land sale complete.
- 1988 station's activities formally wound down and site formally declared surplus. Several buildings demolished to reduce maintenance costs.
- by 1989 much of the original site was largely subdivided into residential lots. Lot 347 remained.
- Since 1991 a number of buildings have been demolished leaving only six significant structures on the site and their outbuildings
- 2009 Administration building adaptively reused for community environmental education centre; childcare administration offices.

== Description ==
=== Site ===
The site is on the eastern side of Seven Hills Road, surrounded by secure fencing and accessed through locked gates. The northern section of the site contains the entrance drive, administration building and residence Melrose. An open car port shelter is west of the administration building.

It contains six structures including two residences, Melrose and Drumtochty with outbuildings and an administration building. The remaining structures are sheds and workshops from its era of use as a poultry research station: an old feed shed, the switchboard and cleaner store and a workshop.

The following buildings/items survive on the site (as of 2008)

- Melrose House (c. 1897) and three outbuildings (garage/carport; chicken run & outdoor toilet)
- Administration Building (1971)
- Drumtochty (c. 1890-1900) and outbuildings
- Lands Department Workshop (c. 1962)
- Switch Board and Cleaner Store (c. 1950s-1960s)
- Old Feed Shed (c. 1947)
- Open Car Shelter and Shelter east of Administration building;
- Remains of former buildings and structures;
- Miscellaneous fencing.

All buildings present as an integrated whole and provide interpretation and definition of a former working research station. The items on the property known as Melrose House, Drumtochty, and the Old Feed Shed have individual significance.

=== Melrose House ===
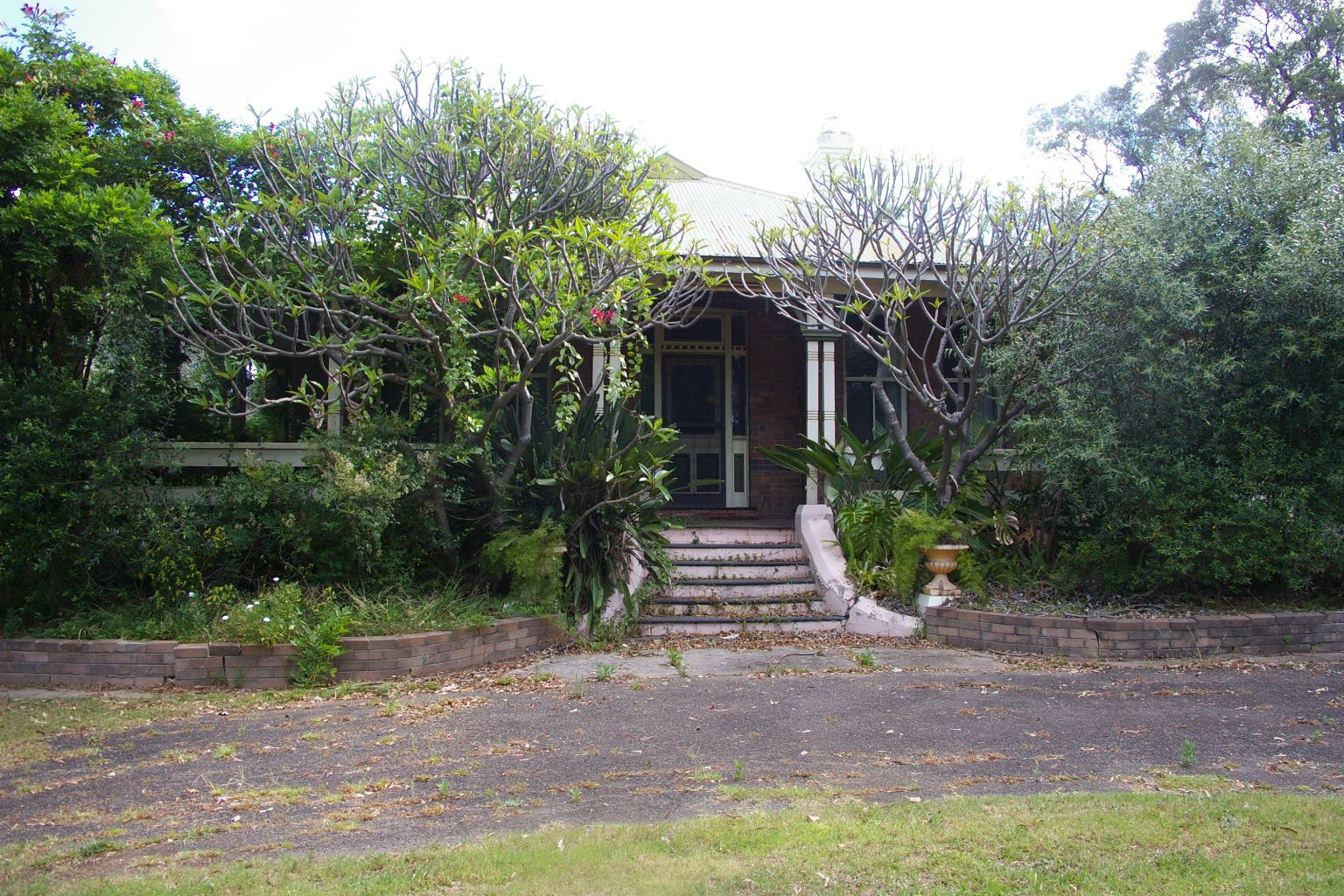
"Melrose" in 2008

This single storey brick residence, completed June 1897, is a vernacular example of the Federation style. The house was symmetrically designed with the main entrance at right angles to Seven Hills Road and a circular driveway approaching the main entry, still in use. Curved stairs approach the front door. The circular driveway appears to have been part of Hadley's original plan and is consistent with the place's original use as a "country residence".

The building originally had a slate roof with terracotta ridge capping, and three false gables, one to each side of the verandah. Curved stairs approached the front doors. The false gables and verandah rail have since been removed, and the roof now has corrugated iron cladding. Cracking of brickwork due to subsidence is evident and attempts to rectify this have been made by the use of steel bracing and tie rods at the two front corners of the building.

The interior comprises a central hallway, four bedrooms with open fireplaces, lounge room with open fireplace, kitchen and pantry, bathroom and laundry. The kitchen and bathroom have been upgraded, but the other rooms retain much of their original fabric and integrity.

3 outbuildings are associated with Melrose: garage/carport; chicken run & outdoor toilet. All three were probably constructed soon after 1926 as they are of similar materials and construction. They don't appear on early site plans or photographs, however two are visible in a 1917 photograph of the rear of the house in the same location as the current toilet. There is also a relatively recent pergola addition at the back of the house that has been used as a barbeque area - it is now on the point of collapse.

=== Administration Building ===
Plans were drawn up 1968–69 by the Government Architect's Office under E.H.(Ted) Turner, roughly contemporaneous with Sydney University's Fisher Library and Chemistry Building and additions to the Art Gallery of NSW, all considered fine examples of the new humanism of Scandinavian architectural design. This was a time when the NSW Government Architect's office was an Australian leader in institutional design. Green and Knight documented the building. Construction was completed by 1971.

The building is a two storied brick and concrete structure of 1000 sq.m.area, with vertical panels of dark face brick separated by lightweight panels containing fenestration and copper sun screens. It has a parapeted form with a simple monopitch roof. The plan comprises a simple rectangular office building with a small central wing containing toilets and service areas on the upper level and air conditioning plant and laboratories on the lower floor (ground) level. It is excavated into the slope so that a broad staircase off the entry drive on its western side accesses the first floor. The only stair connecting the two levels is at one end and not accessed from the foyer, separating the ground floor activities from the public or visitors.

Interior finishes are a standard office fit out with a grid tile ceiling to the upper floor and rendered wall finishes. Internal finishes are now dated and in need of upgrade. There is evidence of office partitioning on the upper level but both ends of the building are clear span with all partitions capable of removal. The current interior layout of the upper floor is largely open plan office space with meeting/conference areas, a reception area, library, lunch room facilities and toilets, with offices, laboratories, plant rooms, staff facilities and a dark room on the lower floor. The building comprises suspended concrete floors on load-bearing masonry walls. As it is set into the existing ground levels, a hardwood sleeper retaining wall runs parallel to its west elevation.

It is set in landscaped grassed areas to the north and west with bitumen-paved car parking areas to the south and east. There appears to have been a barbecue area to the northeast of the building.

=== Drumtochty ===
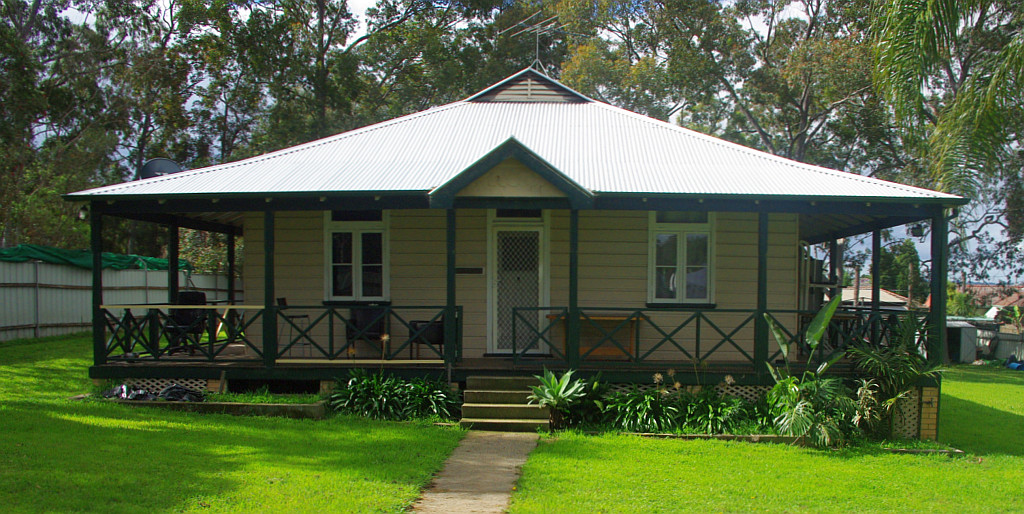
"Drumtochty" after restoration.

Constructed c. 1890 – 1900 at what is now the corner of Seven Hills Road and Australorp Avenue, this would appear to be a vernacular example of a Victorian weatherboard cottage. It was altered in 1966 and was relocated in 1984 (at the time of the sale of the adjacent portion of land) to its present position in anticipation of a proposed road widening of Seven Hills Road. At that time it underwent substantial refurbishment to reverse its layout such that the original rear entrance is now the front door. From 1986 it was used as part of the central Motor Vehicle Depot (relocated from Glenfield) before becoming a caretaker's residence.

At that time it was extensively refurbished and turned 180 degrees in orientation so that the front door is now used as the back door. It was not part of the development of the poultry station and while a reasonable example of late 19th century housing, does not have an important historic relationship with the site. The roof has corrugated iron cladding. Ceilings were replaced due to water damage, internal linings have been replaced, and a verandah balustrade added. The skillion section at the rear was refitted.

The building comprises two bedrooms, lounge and separate dining room, kitchen and family room. The bathroom has been modernised.

The building throughout is in good condition and retains a considerable proportion of original fabric and integrity.

=== Lands Department Workshop (c. 1962) ===
This small building to the west of the Old Feed Shed is timber framed and metal sheet clad with a pitched metal pan roof. It is immediately adjacent to the Old Feed Shed. It is currently fitted with two roller doors. On the 1962 site plan it is identified as the meatmeal research room and this is likely its original function before use as a workshop. It was probably built just prior to 1962 based on its form of construction.

=== Switch Board and Cleaner Store (c. 1950s – 1960s) ===
This appears on the 1962 site plan as a garage or temporary store, although the 1925 plan indicates a building of similar size and location used as a cold brooder. It is a simple timber-framed structure clad in asbestos cement sheet and roofed in corrugated iron. The double-access door is timber and the two louvred windows are now unglazed. The larger section of the building houses the main switchboard to the office building. Security is no longer provided to the switchboard and the building overall is in poor condition.

=== Old Feed Shed (c. 1947) ===
This single storey, open-sided shed comprises rough hewn posts presumably sourced from trees on the property. It appears to have been constructed some time after 1947 as it does not appear in an aerial photograph taken that year. It appears to have been built in several stages, with the southern section first.

The gable roof is clad in corrugated iron and the floor is paved with concrete. The roof structure includes sawn timber members, all exposed within the shed. The hewn round log posts, post heads and bracketing are typical of rural buildings largely classed as the style known as Rude Timber Buildings. The building is in good condition and retains a considerable proportion of o original fabric and integrity.

The property includes one of the largest remaining tracts of the Cumberland Plain Woodland in Seven Hills and one of few in the eastern part of Western Sydney. (National Trust of Australia (NSW) 1997).

=== The World War 1 Memorial (c. 2004) ===
The War Memorial on the site of the proposed road deviation on Lot 4 (its north-western corner) and built by the Friends of Grantham, is of recent construction and comprises a bolted "box" framework of recycled timber set into a mosaic-tiled concrete base. The structure was designed by Simon Cook of Design Rhetoric and the tiling carried out by the Ceramics Research Centre of UWS under the direction of Michael Keighery. It is located on the site of the former Bachelors' Quarters, the small brick footings for which can be seen under the grass cover in the vicinity. It was built to commemorate the returned soldiers who settled on the site as part of the soldier-settlement scheme.

=== Open Car Shelter & shelter east of Administration building ===
Steel framed structures of little heritage significance relating to the most recent period of the site's development

=== Remains of former buildings and structures ===
Large range of footings, concrete slabs and remnant sections of brickwork across the poultry research station area of the site in particular.

=== Miscellaneous fencing ===
Mixture of fencing types largely relating to the most recent period of the site's development, including the central Motor Vehicle Depot in the eastern part of the site. There is some potential for earlier fences or remnants of fences to remain along original/early boundaries.

=== Condition ===
As of 28 October 1999, the physical condition of the remaining buildings was reported as fair to good. Archaeological potential is high.

The archaeological potential of Grantham is found in two areas. Firstly the remains of buildings and features that can be readily seen around the site and secondly in areas that may have potential to reveal material of archaeological value related to earlier phases of use of the station.

The archaeology of the site is now relatively limited due to the excision of most of the site for housing. The remaining land comprises part of the original site and Lot 4 which was outside the station. Lot 4 (apart from the Seven Hills Road frontage) has limited archaeological potential.

Development over the last 40 years with construction of the 1960s administration building with extensive earthworks and ground level changes, the relocation of Drumtochty cottage and construction and later removal of later sheds and car parks has removed the archaeological potential of much of the site. Other areas retain their potential when there has been relatively little disturbance.

Following the completion of the 1991 CMP the Property Services Group of the NSW Government proceeded to subdivide the site and sell the farm area for housing. In preparation for this most of the buildings related to the farm activities were demolished. Several buildings as noted in the descriptions above were retained and still remain on the site. Structures removed were... (see p. 53, Paul Davies P/L, 2005)

The Site in its current form retains ground evidence in the form of foundations, ground slabs and footings of most of the buildings and structures demolished after 1991 along with site infrastructure such as roads and drainage systems. There also survive elements from earlier site activities such as foundations of the former entry gates, several building foundations in Lot 4 and the sites of former wells around Melrose (see below). Recently several fuel tanks were excavated and removed from the area behind Melrose.

As Grantham has not been actively used for a considerable time and not at all since 1990 there has been deterioration of the site remains, particularly from weed infestation and growth of self-sown plantings. There has also been considerable peripheral damage from storms, as seen in one building and a number of mature trees.

Prior to 1991, in anticipation of road works taking place on the excised Lot 4, earth mounding was formed along the approximate line of the excised lot boundary. This was roughly formed and now contains considerable planting.

It appears from site inspection that apart from the items noted, little infrastructure survives on the Melrose/Administration Building section of the site.

=== Areas of archaeological potential ===
In addition to the identified building remains and foundations the following parts of the site are likely to have archaeological potential.

Principally these are:

1. the immediate setting of Melrose including:
- sites of former buildings;
- sites of possible wells (3);
- sites of gardens;
2. the site of the former residence on Seven Hills Road;
3. the whole of the core site around the sheds;
4. the site of the former single men's barracks;
5. the Seven Hills Road alignment and edge;
6. the area around the former entry gates.

==== Melrose ====
Several sites of interest survive in the garden area of Melrose related to well sites. Directly behind the house, now under the pergola, is a concrete-capped well or cistern. This appears to remain largely intact and to date from the time of construction of the house. Adjacent to the driveway and garage is a circular depression that also appears to be a well site although no documentary evidence to support its location has been found.

==== Aboriginal archaeological significance ====
The former Grantham Poultry Research Station falls within a kilometre of Grantham Creek outside the 500m zone established by predictive modelling. Nevertheless, there is some potential that additional, unrecorded sites would have been situated this distance from Grantham Creek. However the potential is not significantly higher than might be expected for a typical bushland site in the area. Further, residential development makes it unlikely that undisturbed sites would have survived. The overall potential within the site is considered to be low.

In summary, areas of historical archaeological potential have been identified as follows:

- High archaeological potential
  - Melrose House precinct;
  - Former Research Station core area;
  - Bachelors' Quarters site;
  - Former Workshop site;
- Moderate archaeological potential:
  - Seven Hills Road alignment;
  - Drumtochty precinct (excluding footprint and vicinity of former workshop site – based on 1943 aerial photograph which shows structures relating to the poultry farm in this area;
  - parking lot in the vicinity of the former Administration Building – based on 1943 aerial photograph which shows structures relating to the poultry farm in this area;
- Low archaeological potential:
  - all other areas of the former Grantham Poultry Research Station site

==== Miscellaneous fencing ====
Mixture of fencing types largely relating to the most recent period of the site's development, including the central Motor Vehicle Depot in the eastern part of the site. There is some potential for earlier fences or remnants of fences to remain along original/early boundaries.

Four buildings remain in good order. Foundations remain for other buildings used for poultry research on site service road remains reasonably intact. Wooden Bachelors Barracks from World War I does not exist any longer but former location is known. Three brick footings belonging to the former Bachelor Barracks have been exposed. A memorial has been installed on that location. Base of concrete posts for main entrance to the site from c. 1920s to 1971 exist inside the boundary between Lot 4 and Seven Hills Road.

== Heritage listing ==
The former Grantham Poultry Research Station has historic and social significance as the focus of the poultry industry in New South Wales for over 70 years. Operating as an experimental farm under the NSW Government the property strongly reflects government support and initiative to further the efficiency and productivity of the poultry industry. The scientific research undertaken on the property, particularly research into manganese and vitamin deficiencies in food and their effect on hatchability, effectively saved the Poultry Industry from ruin and brought international acclaim, establishing the estate as one of the six leading poultry research stations in the world. The estate also has State significance, presumed to be the only poultry research station in New South Wales.

The site illustrates the changes in agricultural use and government policy, from its operation as a private farm to its development under the Soldier Settlement Scheme, and its subsequent operation as a series of governmental research stations including its establishment as a model poultry farm. Since the time of early grants and ownership, the property has a continuity of use as a working farm.

The site is one of the largest open spaces in the area and contains a number of significant mature trees comprising a remnant tract of Cumberland Woodland Plain Woodland.

The two farm residences, Melrose House and Drumtochty, and the Old Feed Shed have aesthetic significance as good examples of rural structures that remain attached to their original farm property, providing an important link to the early history of the area (National Trust of Australia (NSW) 1997).

Grantham Poultry Research Station was listed on the New South Wales State Heritage Register on 7 April 2000 having satisfied the following criteria.

The place is important in demonstrating the course, or pattern, of cultural or natural history in New South Wales.

Grantham Poultry Research Station (former) has historic significance as the focus of the poultry industry in new South Wales for over 70 years. It served as the base of operation for the State Poultry Expert from 1912. It has been the a contributing source for the change all the County of Cumberland form orcharding to poultry farming. The site illustrates changes in agricultural use and government policy, from its operation as a private farm to its development under the Soldier Settlement Scheme, and its subsequent operation as a series of governmental research stations including its establishment as a model poultry farm. Since the time of early grants and ownership, the property has a continuity of use as a working farm.

The original residence known as Melrose built by William Chadwick in 1897 is one of the early surviving farm buildings in the area and provides an important link to the early history of the area. It is particularly significant in the area as it is a substantial residence originally associated with a significant property and in its original relationship to Seven Hills Road.

The place is important in demonstrating aesthetic characteristics and/or a high degree of creative or technical achievement in New South Wales.

The site is one of the largest open spaces in the area and contains a number of significant trees in Cumberland Woodland Plain. The adjoining Seven Hills Road served as a boundary line for the Prospect Common c. 1803. The road (and property) follow the ridge line and as it proceeds past the property it maintains a rural road aspect. There is evidence of cultural planting's.

The two farm residences, Melrose and Drumtochty and the Old Feed Shed have aesthetic significance as good examples of rural structures that remain attached to their original farm property.

The place has a strong or special association with a particular community or cultural group in New South Wales for social, cultural or spiritual reasons.

It served as the base for training and stock and feed supply for local and other State Returning Soldiers Settlements during and post World War I. The site housed a wooden bachelors barracks that contributed to the rehabilitation and job reassignment of Australia's maimed and intact young men returning from the fledgling nation's initial involvement in a World War.

The place has potential to yield information that will contribute to an understanding of the cultural or natural history of New South Wales.

Some of Australia's best known agricultural scientists achieved international reputations for work undertaken on this site. Scientific research into manganese and vitamin deficiencies and their effect on hatchability during the 1940s helped revolutionise poultry farming worldwide and confirmed the NSW government's involvement in agriculture research. The site became one of the leading poultry research centres in the world. Significant research continued up to the 1980s. Archaeological potential of the site is high as foundations remain for buildings associated with poultry research.

The place possesses uncommon, rare or endangered aspects of the cultural or natural history of New South Wales.

It is presumed to be the only poultry research station in New South Wales. Cumberland Plain Woodland is an endangered ecological community listed under the Threatened Species Act 1995. Less than 7% of the original distribution of the woodland remains.

The place is important in demonstrating the principal characteristics of a class of cultural or natural places/environments in New South Wales.

Base for state poultry expert, base for returned soldier settlement training & feeding & stock supply in poultry farming. believed to be one of top & poultry research centres in world. Stand of vegetation representative of Cumberland plain Woodland.
