= Seven Hills, New South Wales =

Seven Hills
- Suburb
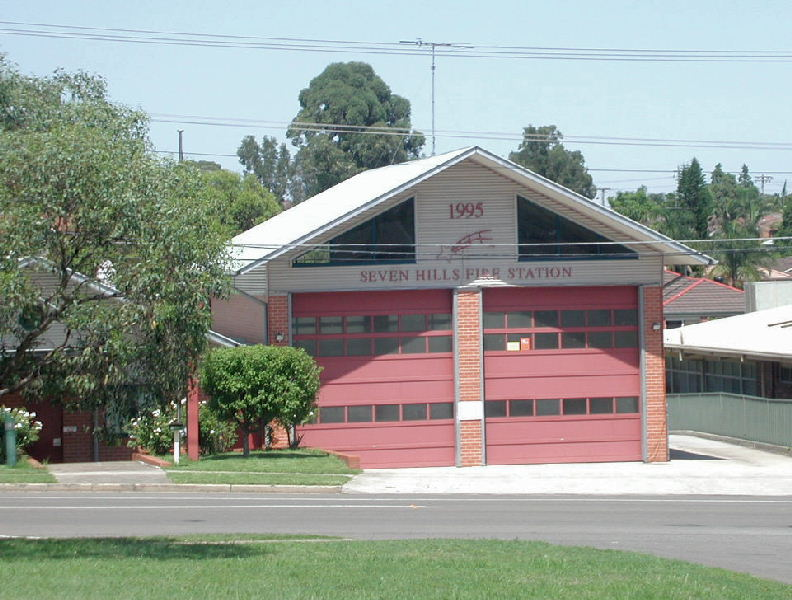
- Seven Hills Fire Station in 2006

- Interactive map of Seven Hills
- Coordinates: 33°46′40″S 150°56′30″E
- Country: Australia
- State: New South Wales
- Region: Greater Western Sydney
- City: Sydney
- LGAs: City of Blacktown; City of Parramatta
- Location: 33 km (21 mi) north west of Sydney CBD
- Established: 1800

Government
  - State electorates: Prospect; Winston Hills
  - Federal divisions: Greenway; McMahon; Parramatta
- Elevation: 45 m (148 ft)

Population
  - Total: 20,095 (SAL 2021)
- Postcode: 2147 (1730 for Seven Hills Post Office Boxes)
Suburbs around Seven Hills
Lalor Park	Kings Langley	Bella Vista
Blacktown	Seven Hills	Baulkham Hills
Prospect	Toongabbie	Winston Hills

Seven Hills is a suburb in the Greater Western Sydney region of Sydney, in the state of New South Wales, Australia, located 33 kilometres (21 mi) North West of the Sydney central business district. Seven Hills is within the local government areas of the City of Parramatta and Blacktown City councils.

== Name ==
The name 'Seven Hills' is thought to be affiliated with Matthew Pearce, a settler in Sydney who was granted 160 acres (65 ha.) of land in 1795. Pearce named his allotment Kings Langley Farm and in that lot, he could observe seven nearby hills. The "seven hills" observed by Pearce could possibly have been the surrounding areas, which are hilly and today have "hill" in their name, such as Castle Hill, Baulkham Hills, Rooty Hill, Prospect Hill, Beaumont Hills, Rouse Hill and Constitution Hill.

Though the origin of the name of the suburb still remains undocumented. Furthermore, the name was frequently used by 1803 when a notice in the Sydney Gazette that was about the dispersion of flour from stores to the residents at "Castle Hill, Seven Hills and other outposts".

== History ==
Prior to European settlement in the 1790s, the area now known as Seven Hills was originally settled and occupied for hundreds, if not thousands, of years by indigenous peoples who most probably would have identified with the Warmuli and Toogagal clans, of the Darug nation. The vicinity of Seven Hills was first visited by Europeans very early on in the settlement of the colony of New South Wales, possibly as early as April 1788 by Arthur Phillip or more certainly by Watkin Tench in June 1789.

The first land grant by the colonial administration (in what was then known as the "District of Toongabbee") was to an ex Marine soldier, John Redmond in May 1793, whose grant of 60 acres (24 ha) was adjacent to a track which later became Station Road. At least 13 further grants were made in this area before 1800. Matthew Pearce (1762–1831) was granted 160 acres (65 ha)) in 1795, which he named after Kings Langley in Hertfordshire, England, where he was said to have been born. George Best and John Pye Snr were given land grants in Seven Hills in 1796.

The area of the Pearce grant bounded by the present Old Windsor Road, Seven Hills Road, Chapel Lane (in what is now Baulkham Hills) and Toongabbie Creek became known as Seven Hills from about 1800, because his farm was situated near the seventh hill along the road from Parramatta. In 1804 part of the Cumberland Plain in an area which later became the Grantham Estate was reserved for use as Prospect Common and at some time after this possibly around 1819 two 50 acres (20 ha) land grants were made to Samuel Haynes and Samuel Dent.

Seven Hills encompassed a much larger area than now and as late as 1900, landowners as far afield as the modern suburbs of Bella Vista, Glenwood, and Parklea identified their properties as being located in Seven Hills. In the period 1959 to the 1970s, housing schemes excised land that was previously part of Seven Hills to create the suburbs of Lalor Park and Kings Langley.

The railway from Parramatta to Blacktown Road station (now Blacktown) was completed as a single line in 1860. A stationmaster's residence and siding were constructed near a level crossing at what was to become Toongabbie Road (later Seven Hills Road) in December 1863. A platform was built in 1869, and stops at the station were scheduled in the timetable from September of that year. The road bridge on Seven Hills Road across the railway line was constructed in 1975, replacing the level crossing.

=== Grantham Heritage Park ===
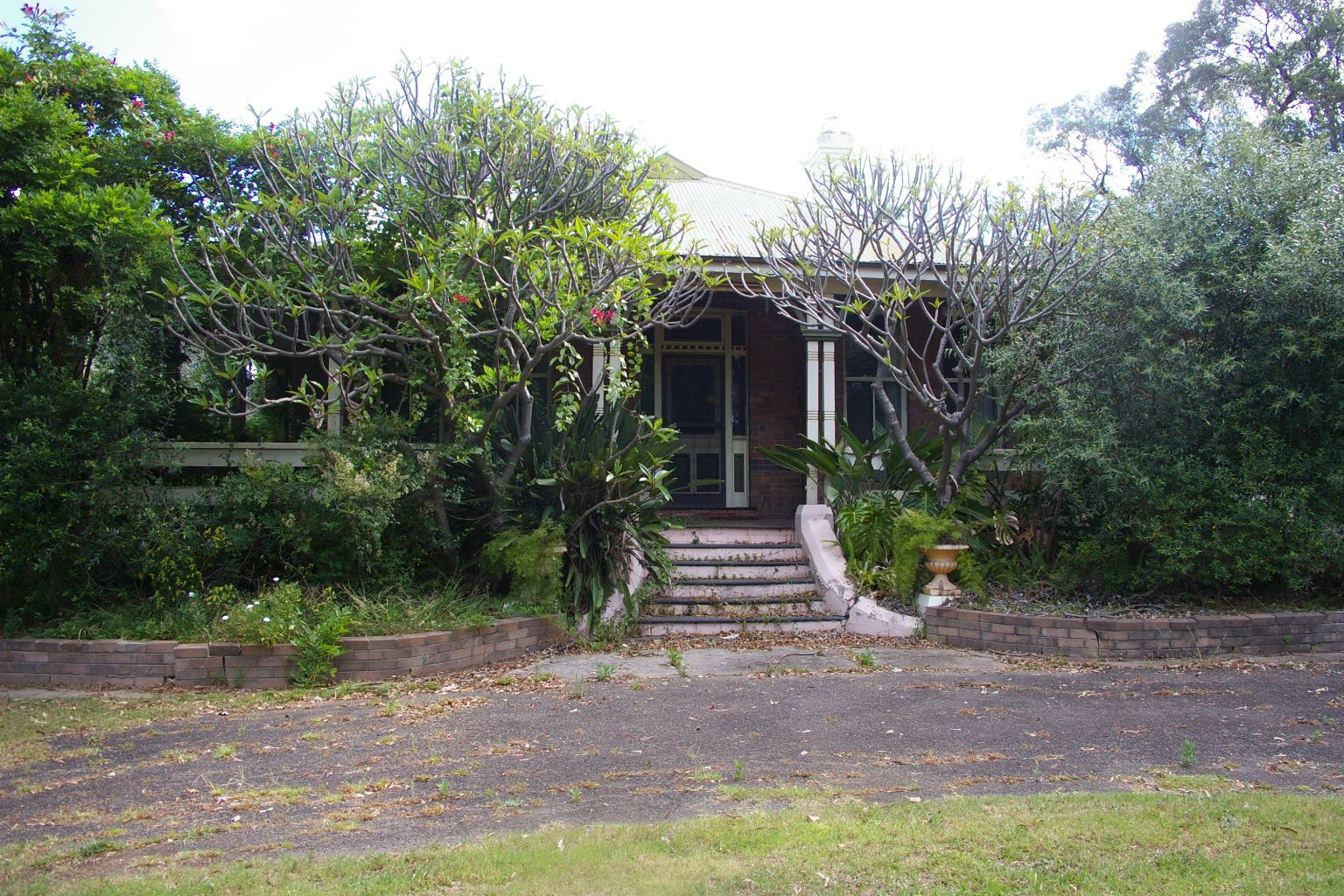
"Melrose" in 2008

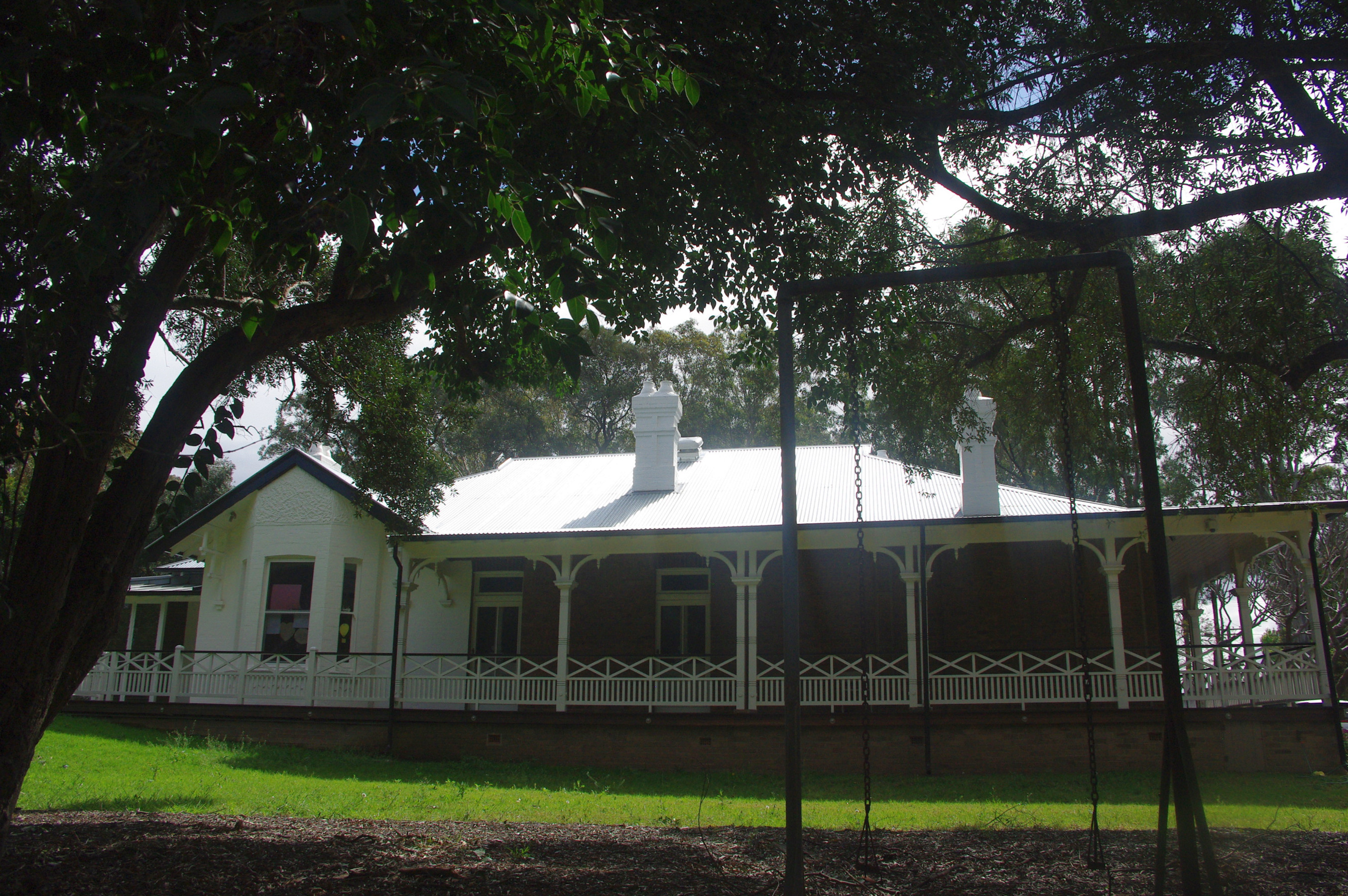
View of the restored "Melrose" taken from the east side looking west – 2015

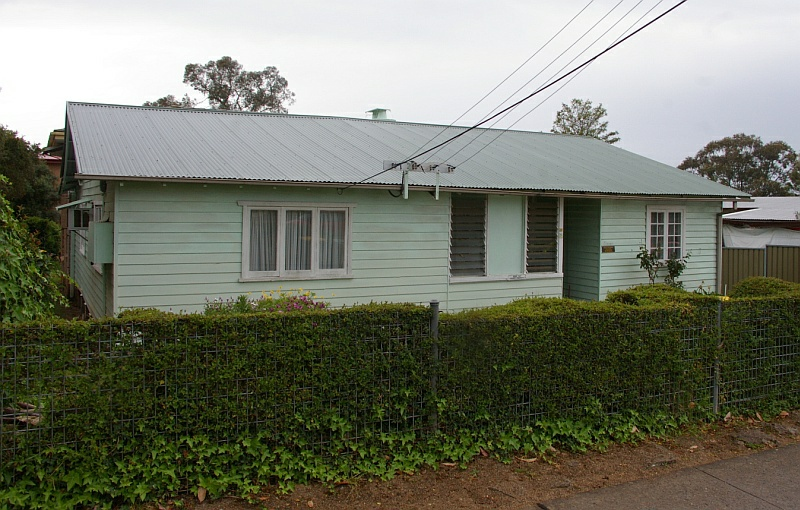
A still extant soldier settlement house in 2010 – the external fabric is almost unchanged.

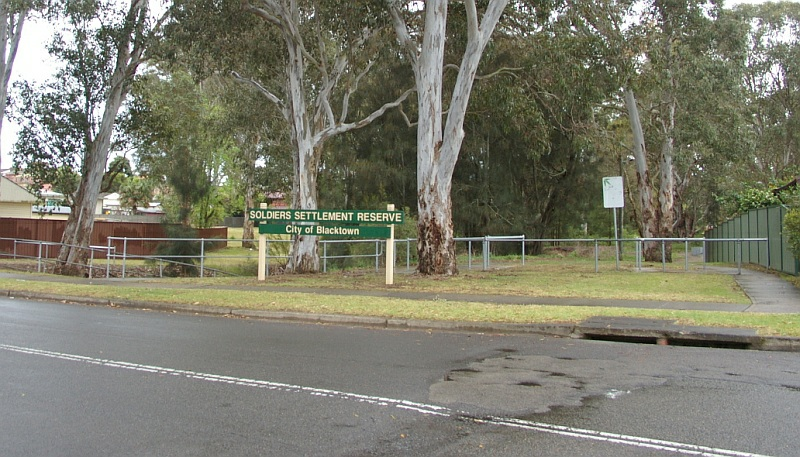
This recreation reserve on Grantham Road commemorates the soldier settlers

The Haynes and Dent lots were acquired in 1897 by William Chadwick. Chadwick commissioned a Sydney architect, Byera Hadley (later to become the leading architectural academic in NSW), to build a large house on the land which he named "Melrose". A much smaller house known as "Drumtochty" had been built around 1890 on the estate, to the south, at the corner of Seven Hills Road and what is now Australorp Avenue.

In 1901 the property was acquired by John Rabone who commenced a poultry breeding and experimental farm which he named "Grantham Poultry Stud". In 1906 there was a further change in ownership and the farm was under the control of Martin & Co owned by a Mr Francis Martin. In 1912 the company appointed James Hadlington who concurrently held the position as the state Department of Agriculture's "Poultry Expert".

By 1917 Australia was confronting the problem of providing suitable employment for both able-bodied and disabled veterans of the First World War. This led to the development of soldier settlement schemes. Hadlington persuaded the state government to acquire the farm for such a scheme it being thought that ex-servicemen including those disabled and even limbless would be able to make an adequate living for themselves and their families from poultry farming. The transfer took place in July 1917 and the area of the farm nearer Seven Hills Station fronting (what is now) Grantham Road was subdivided into eleven 5-acre (20,000 m^{2}) blocks for married men with the balance becoming a poultry breeding, stock and feed storage and training facility named "Grantham State Poultry Farm".

Initially the ex-servicemen trainees on the farm were housed in tents but by 1918 barracks-like accommodation had been put up near Seven Hills Road. The small farms were initially taken up by "maimed settlers" who occupied small houses which had been built for them and their families. As with other such schemes some of the settlers found it hard to make a living from agriculture despite establishment loans and sustenance payments and by 1922 some of the original occupiers had abandoned the project leaving the blocks for other ex-servicemen to take over. Over the next three decades the farms were turned over to other activities or further subdivided and by the 1950s none were being used for poultry farming although many such enterprises had been successfully established in the surrounding districts principally by migrants from Europe.

In 1923 the "Grantham State Poultry Farm" was no longer required for the settlement scheme and passed to the Department of Agriculture for use as a demonstration farm and named the "Government Poultry Farm". In 1939 the farm's function changed to one of experimentation and research aimed at improving the quality of the poultry farming in the state. This led to yet another change in name with the farm becoming known as "Poultry Experiment Farm, Seven Hills". From the 1940s the farm was the site of ground breaking research (notably by Professor Bill McClymont and Dr Len Hart) into poultry husbandry and nutrition leading to significant improvements in the efficiency of poultry farming in Australia and overseas. This was officially recognised when the name was changed to the Poultry Research Station in 1960.

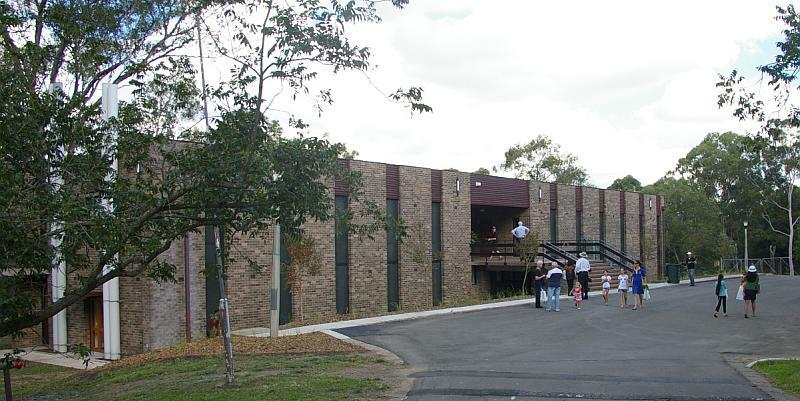
The 1971 office block now occupied by Blacktown City Council in 2010

In 1971 a new building was erected to house research and administrative functions of the research station and (later) offices of the NSW Egg Marketing Board.

By 1983 the site was known as "Agricultural Station, Seven Hills" and operations had begun to wind down. Much of the Department of Agriculture land was declared surplus to requirements and by 1989 the station had closed and the land sold off for residential development.

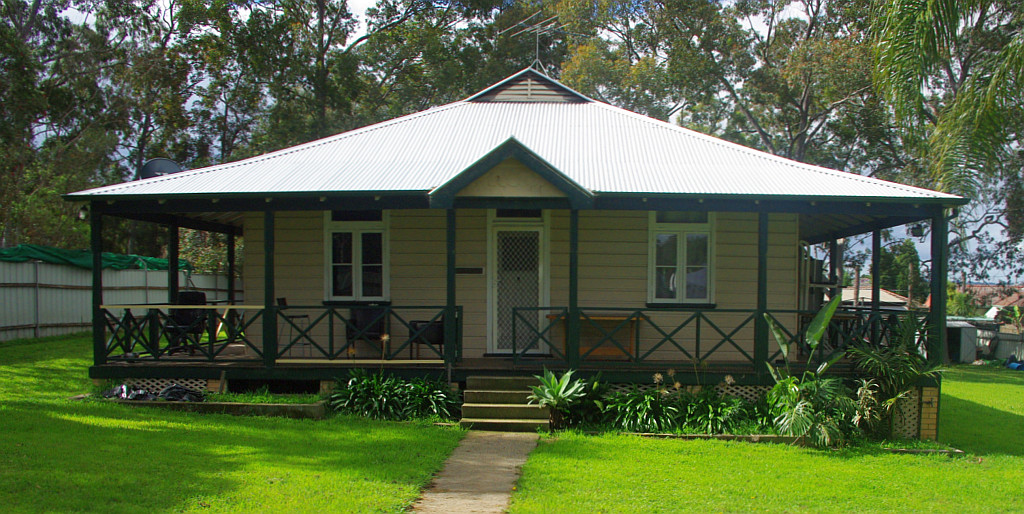
The cottage, "Drumtochty", – Grantham Heritage Park Seven Hills NSW after restoration.

In 2004 the remnant of the estate including "Melrose", "Drumtochty" (by now moved to the northern end of the estate) and the administrative building were acquired the City of Blacktown. In 2008 a plan for the use of the administration building as council offices and the development of the lands as a heritage park was announced and public comment was invited. The remnant portion has been named "Grantham Heritage Park". The entire estate, including Melrose and Drumtochty, is heritage-listed.

The Heritage Park from Seven Hills Road South looking north showing some of the remnant Cumberland Plains vegetation

The park lands contain some of the last vestiges of Cumberland Plain woodlands and the Grantham Heritage Park Memorial commemorating the soldier settlers and trainees.

== Heritage listings ==
Seven Hills has a number of heritage-listed sites, including:

- 37-39 Roger Place: Dayton House
- 71 Seven Hills Road: Grantham Poultry Research Station
- 313 Seven Hills Road: St Andrew's Anglican Church

== Demographics ==
As of the 2021 census:

- The most common ancestries were Australian 20.5%, English 19.1%, Indian 12.0%, Chinese 5.7% and Irish 5.2%.
- 50.6% of people were born in Australia. The most common countries of birth were India 12.2%, Sri Lanka 4.2%, Philippines 3.4%, China 2.5% and New Zealand 2.0%.
- The most common responses for religion were Catholic 23.1%, No Religion 19.9%, Hinduism 14.6%, Anglican 8.5% and Not stated 6.8%.
- 49.5% of people only spoke English at home. Other languages spoken at home included Tamil 6.0%, Punjabi 4.7%, Hindi 3.9%, Arabic 2.6% and Mandarin 2.4%.

== Commercial areas ==
Seven Hills Plaza is a major shopping centre in Seven Hills. It is located adjacent to Prospect Highway and slightly to the south-west of the railway station. It was originally opened in 1960 as Seven Hills Regional Shopping Centre. The Seven Hills Plaza shopping centre has remained relatively unchanged since the early 2000s (with the exception of a modernised parking number plate and boom gate system) and is like a time capsule when compared to nearby shopping centres such as Blacktown's Westpoint and Parramatta's Westfield shopping centres.

There are a very large number of industrial and commercial developments contained in the area to the north of the railway bounded by the Prospect Highway, Abbott Road to the north, Old Windsor Road to the west and Blacktown Creek to the south. The studios of broadcasting station Hope 103.2 FM and the NSW Fire Brigade Station, built in 1995 are situated on the southern side of Leabons Lane near the junction with Seven Hills Road South.

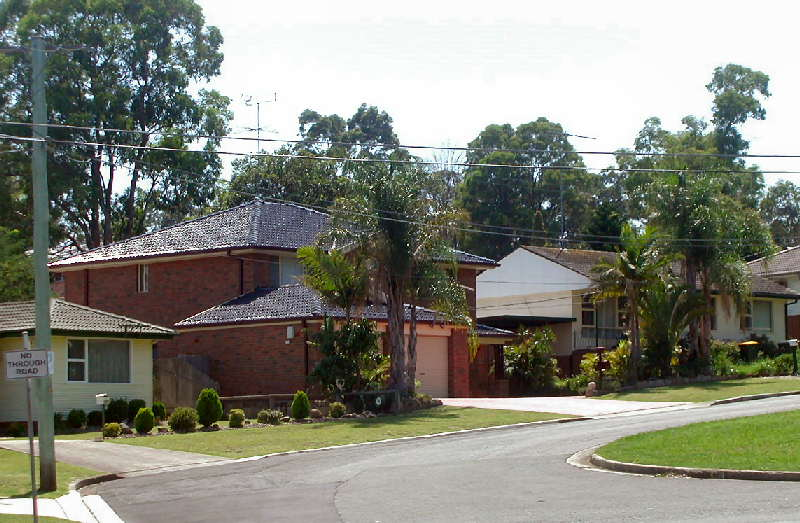
Florida Place

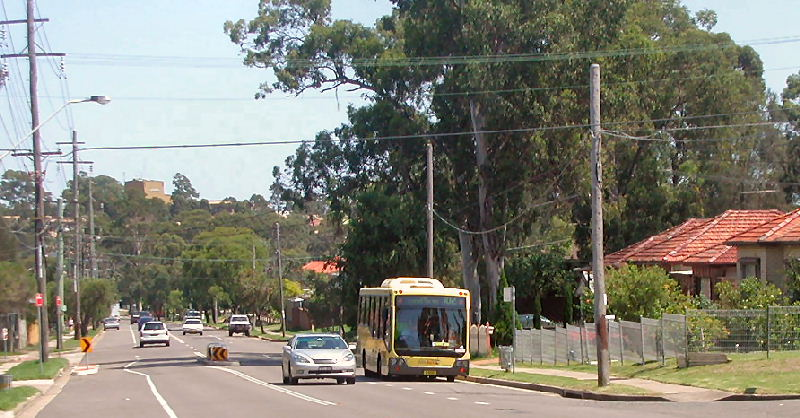
Leabons Lane

== Residential areas ==
The suburb is predominantly residential. Florida Place, a cul-de-sac, is typical of many residential streets in Seven Hills especially those south of the railway. The buildings show a transition from the mid 20th century single storey mixed construction dwellings with an average of approx 100 m^{2} floorspace on 600 to 900 m^{2} blocks to replacement two storey brick veneer dwellings built in the 2000s with twice to three times the floorspace.

Leabons Lane, is typical of streets that are used as transport corridors with a mix of residential and light commercial use. Despite being narrow it is a busy thoroughfare linking the residential areas of south Seven Hills with Blacktown. Note the plethora of signage, traffic calming devices and utility poles strung with overhead power and TV cabling typical of streetscapes in western Sydney.

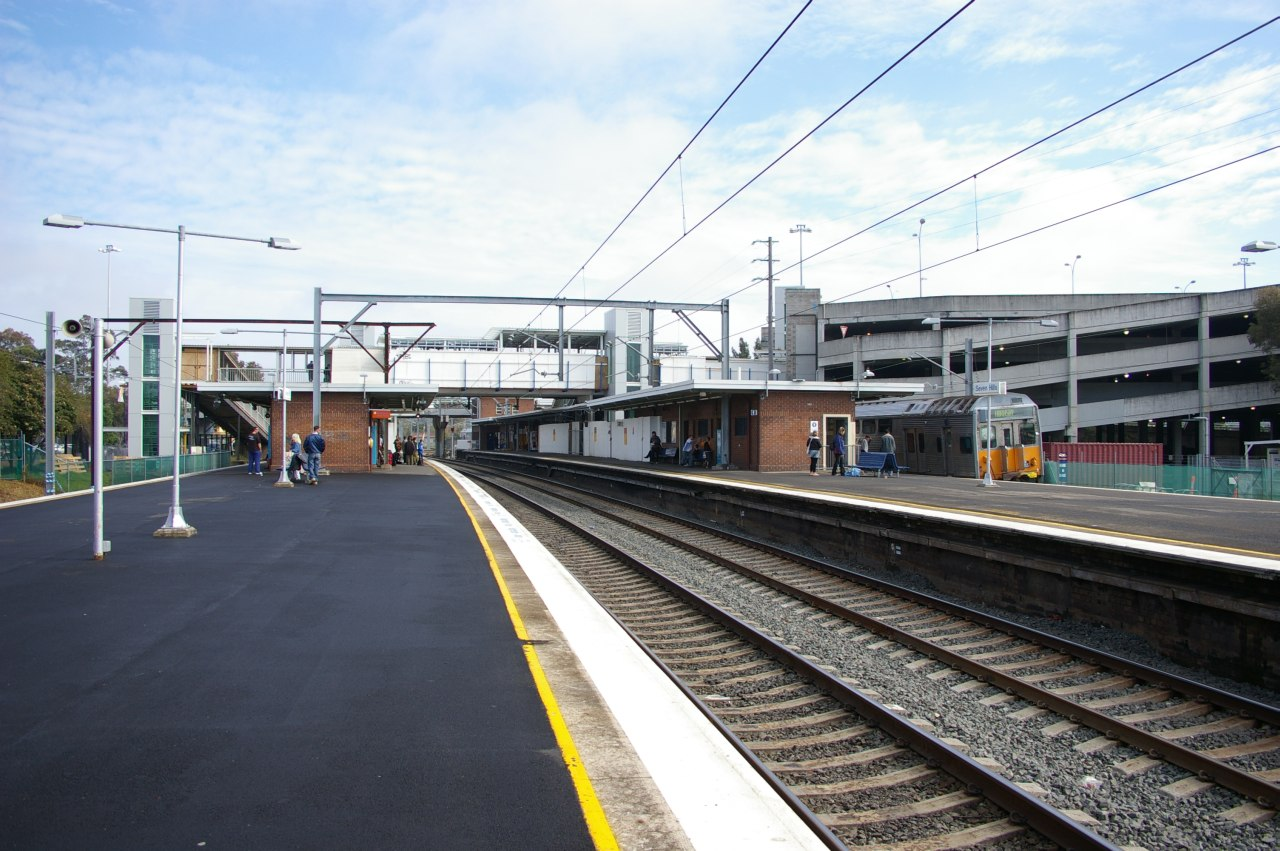
Seven Hills Railway Station looking west

== Transport ==
Seven Hills is located in an ideal section of Western Sydney when it comes to transport and logistics.

Sydney Trains provides regular services from Seven Hills railway station to Central railway station in 34 minutes. The suburb incorporates the localities of Grantham (the Grantham Estate) and Grantham Heights. The actual seven hills are situated along the Old Windsor Road between Westmead and where today's road intersects Norwest Boulevard, Bella Vista. Seven Hills railway station is a major interchange on the North Shore & Western Line of the Sydney Trains network with in excess of 2000 commuter parking spaces. Seven Hills Railway Station has the most commuter parking of any station in Western Sydney with there being more and more new parking lots being built around the station. Seven Hills is located approximately 32 km by rail or 34 minutes travel from Central railway station, on the railway line to Penrith.

The M2 Hills Motorway, M4 Motorway and Westlink M7 are three major arterial roads that link Seven Hills to other parts of Sydney. The Prospect Highway and Seven Hills Road are other major roads in the suburb.

CDC NSW provides regular services to Sydney CBD, Macquarie Park, Baulkham Hills, Bella Vista, Castle Hill, Blacktown, Toongabbie, Pendle Hill and Parramatta and Busways services to Kings Langley. The 611 bus runs along the M2 Hills Motorway from Blacktown till Macquarie Park with Seven Hills and Macquarie University being key stops. CDC NSW has two depots in Seven Hills, one on Hartley Road which is CDC NSW Seven Hills and one on Foundry Road which is also the company headquarters.

== Climate ==
Climate data for Seven Hills (1950–1975)
Month	Jan	Feb	Mar	Apr	May	Jun	Jul	Aug	Sep	Oct	Nov	Dec	Year
Record high °C (°F)	41.4 (106.5)	41.1 (106.0)	40.0 (104.0)	33.6 (92.5)	28.3 (82.9)	26.0 (78.8)	25.8 (78.4)	27.8 (82.0)	35.0 (95.0)	36.6 (97.9)	39.7 (103.5)	41.7 (107.1)	41.7 (107.1)
Mean daily maximum °C (°F)	28.3 (82.9)	27.7 (81.9)	27.0 (80.6)	24.1 (75.4)	20.0 (68.0)	17.5 (63.5)	17.4 (63.3)	18.6 (65.5)	21.4 (70.5)	23.8 (74.8)	26.3 (79.3)	28.4 (83.1)	23.4 (74.1)
Mean daily minimum °C (°F)	16.7 (62.1)	17.0 (62.6)	15.7 (60.3)	12.3 (54.1)	8.3 (46.9)	6.3 (43.3)	4.5 (40.1)	5.9 (42.6)	7.9 (46.2)	11.0 (51.8)	12.9 (55.2)	15.3 (59.5)	11.2 (52.2)
Record low °C (°F)	8.9 (48.0)	8.3 (46.9)	5.3 (41.5)	4.4 (39.9)	0.8 (33.4)	−1.1 (30.0)	−3.9 (25.0)	−0.8 (30.6)	0.3 (32.5)	3.3 (37.9)	6.1 (43.0)	8.5 (47.3)	−3.9 (25.0)
Average precipitation mm (inches)	102.3 (4.03)	116.5 (4.59)	104.5 (4.11)	73.7 (2.90)	69.1 (2.72)	78.9 (3.11)	42.8 (1.69)	55.2 (2.17)	45.8 (1.80)	70.3 (2.77)	83.5 (3.29)	70.1 (2.76)	912.8 (35.94)
Average precipitation days	10.4	11.0	11.2	8.8	8.6	9.5	7.0	7.4	7.6	9.7	9.8	9.5	110.3

== Education ==
Pre-schools

There are at least six early childhood educational facilities located in Seven Hills including two owned and operated by Blacktown City Council

Primary schools

- Bert Oldfield Public School – K-6 government school
- Our Lady of Lourdes Primary School – K-6 Roman Catholic systemic school
- Seven Hills Public School – K-6 government school
- Seven Hills North Public School K-6 government school
- Seven Hills West Public School – P-6 government school
- The Meadows Public School – K-6 government school

Secondary schools

- The Hills Sports High School – 7-12 government high school (formerly known as Grantham High School to 2001) – offers Talented Sports Program and is also location of a Saturday Community Languages School
- Seven Hills High School – 7-12 government high school – with a TAFE on site - also a feeder for the 11-12 Wyndham College

School for special purposes (SSP)

- William Rose School – K-12 school catering for students who have a visual disability plus an additional disability, students who have a hearing disability plus an additional disability and students who are Deafblind.

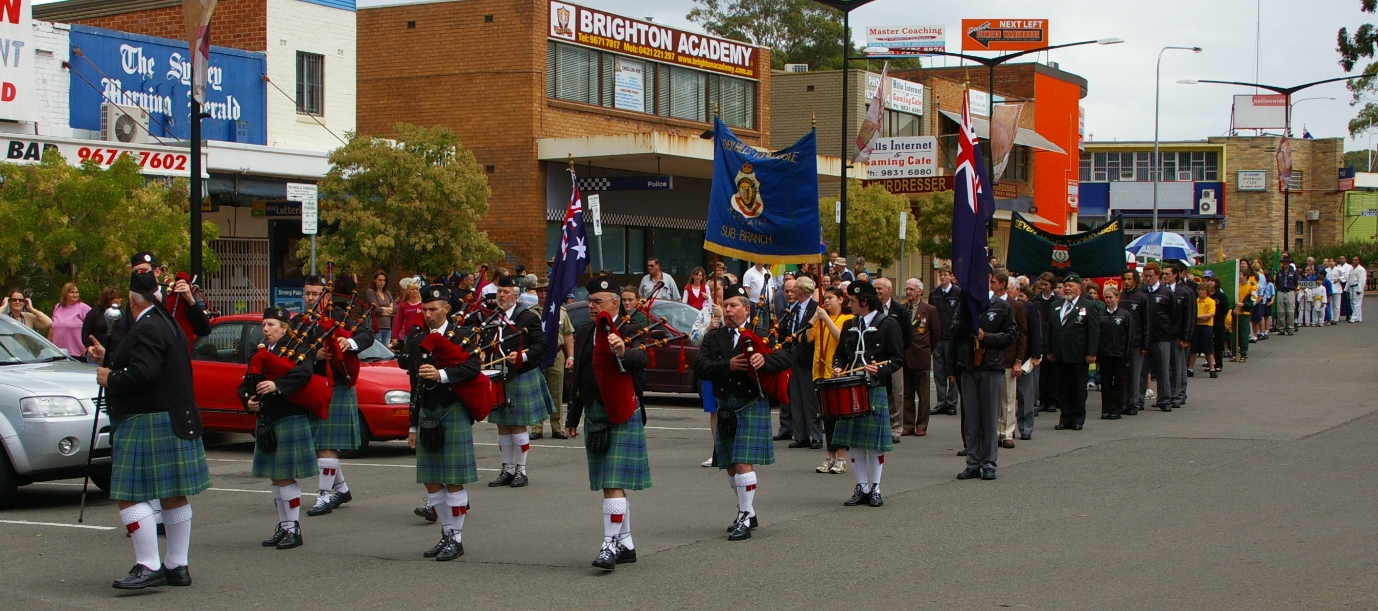
Anzac Day commemoration in Seven Hills, 2008

== Notable residents ==
- Maureen Caird, athlete
- Steve Cummins, rugby union player with the Melbourne Rebels
- Glenn Druery, Ultra Distance cycle racer, grew up in Seven Hills
- Blake Gaudry, 2012 Olympian
- Hamilton Hume, early explorer, born in Seven Hills
- Felix Lee, Stray Kids member
- Matt Moran, celebrity chef whose family lived in MacKenzie Boulevard. He attended Metella Road Public School and Grantham High School
- Nathan Rees, 41st Premier of New South Wales
- Sanford Wheeler, Australian rules footballer

== See also ==
- Seven hills (disambiguation)
