= Hillsbus =

Bus company

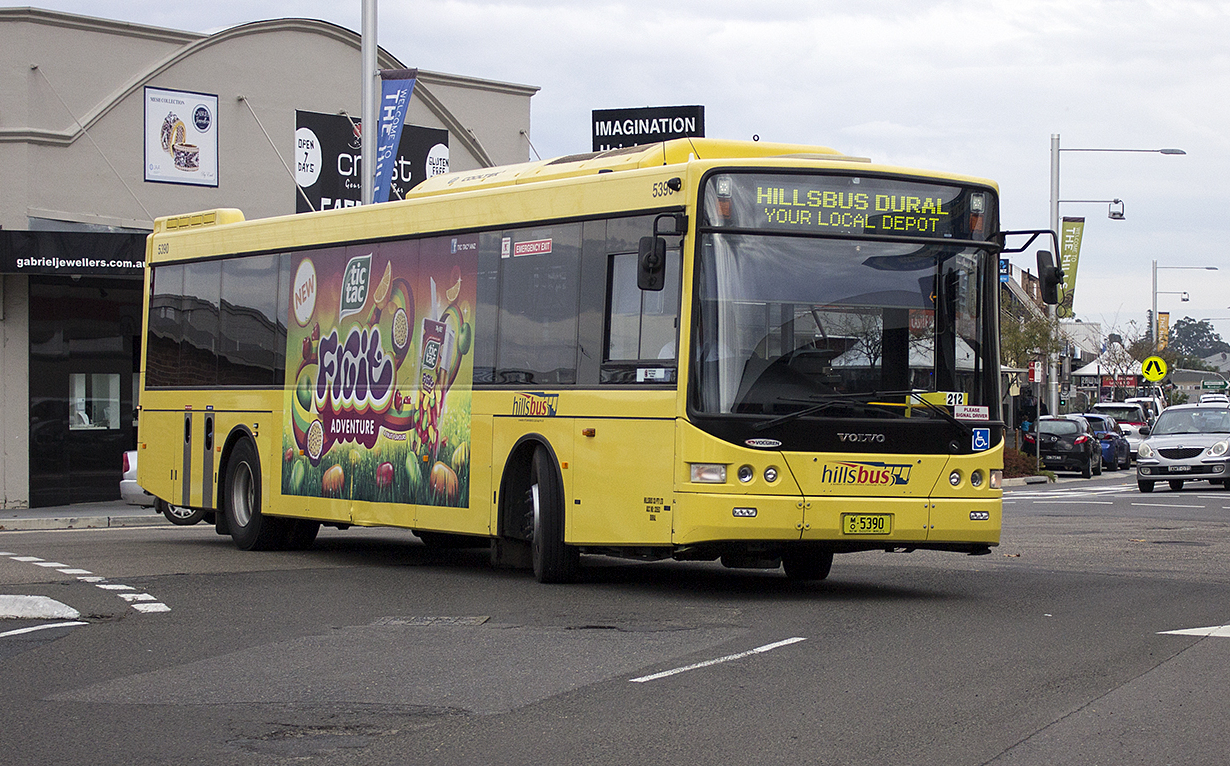
- A Volgren CR228L bodied Volvo B7RLE in July 2013
- Parent: ComfortDelGro Australia
- Founded: February 2002 (brand); December 2004 (company)
- Defunct: April 2023 (replaced by CDC NSW)
- Service area: Hills District
- Service type: Bus services
- Depots: Foundry Road (Seven Hills); Dural; Rouse Hill
- Website: www.cdcbus.com.au/hillsbus

Hillsbus was an Australian bus company that operated services in the Hills District of Sydney. Founded in 2004 when National Express merged its Glenorie Bus Company and Westbus (Hills District operations only) subsidiaries, it was later part of ComfortDelGro Australia. In early 2023, the Hillsbus brand was replaced by ComfortDelGro's CDC NSW brand.

== History ==
=== First use of the Hillsbus name ===
In 1996, Westbus established a separate Hillsbus brand to run express services from the Hills District to the Sydney CBD and North Sydney, initially via the Anzac Bridge and from 1997 via the M2 Hills Motorway. However, the Hillsbus brand seemed to have disappeared by the 2000s as these services were classified as Westbus rather than Hillsbus in early versions of the Westbus website. These Westbus services, however, were still referred to by Westbus as "Hills City Express".

=== 2002–2023 ===
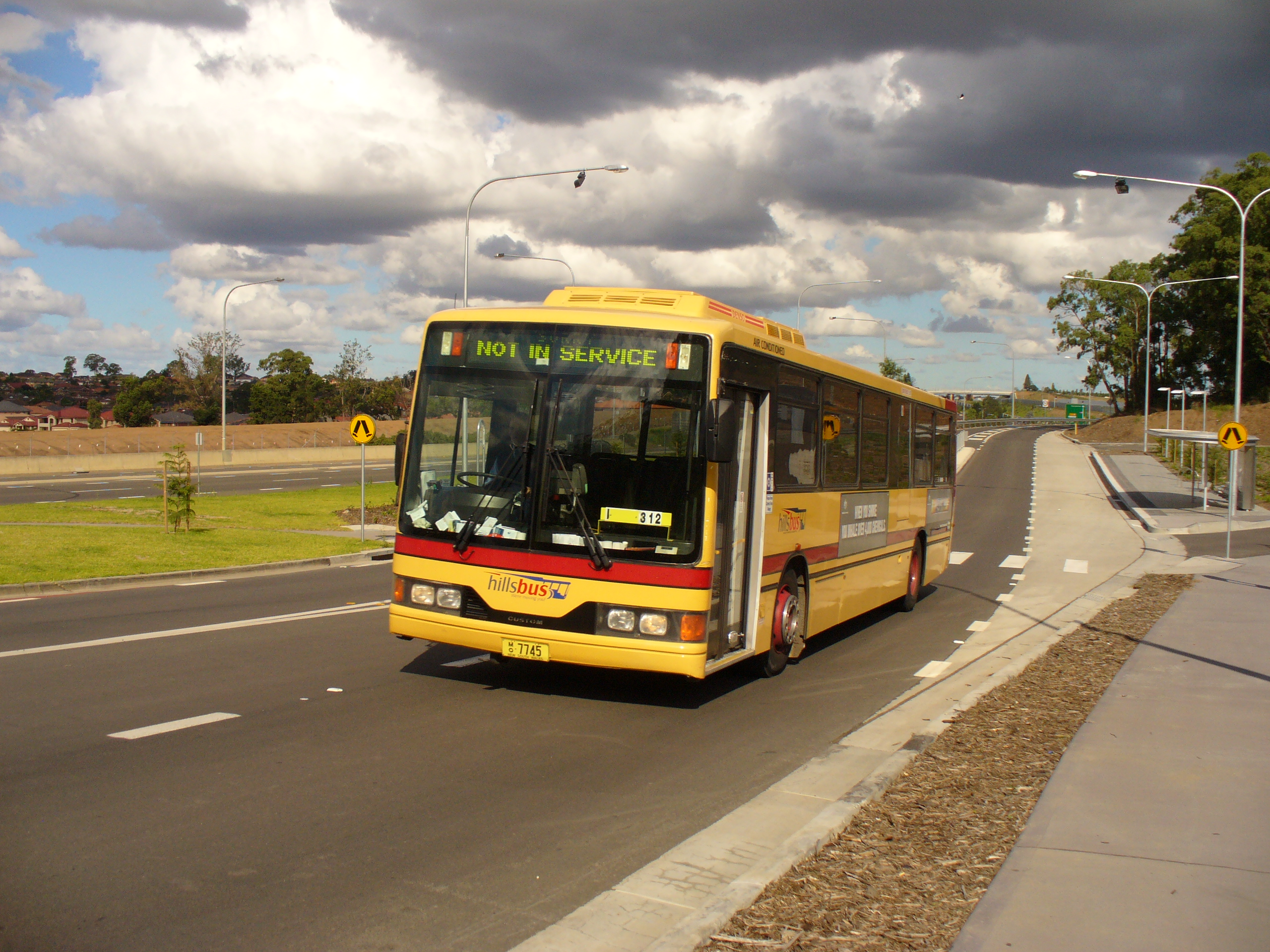
A Custom Coaches 510 bodied Mercedes-Benz O405 in September 2007

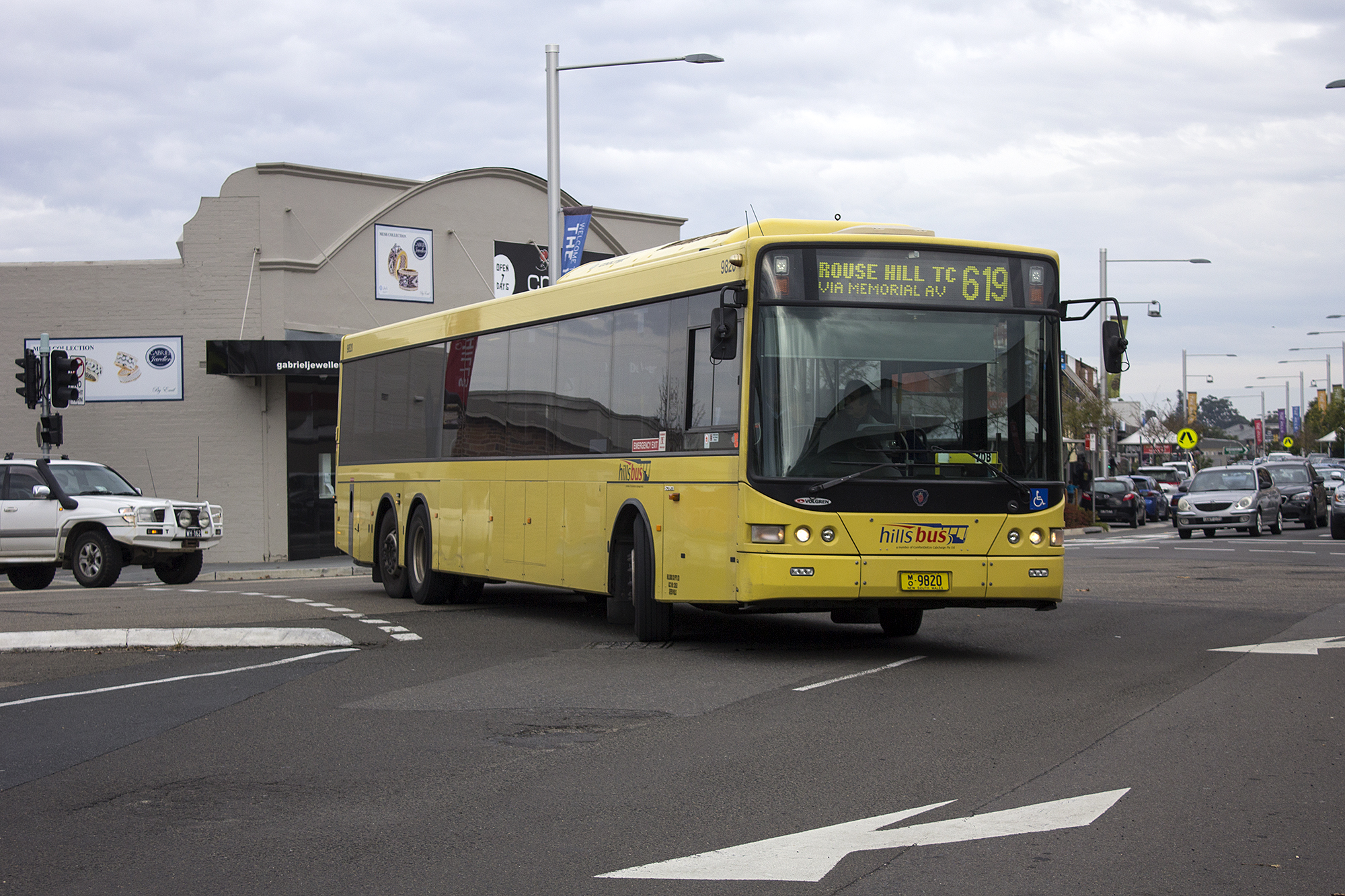
A Volgren CR228L bodied Scania K280UB in July 2013

On 11 February 2002, Hillsbus was revived as a joint venture between Westbus and National Express' newly acquired Glenorie Bus Company, and introduced a new bus route 642 under the Hillsbus brand. This service linked Dural and the City via the M2 and was therefore known as a "M2 City" express service. The joint venture also brought in five new articulated buses for the service in May that year. On 8 July 2002, Hillsbus introduced three more M2 City routes 650, 652 and 654. According to the Hillsbus timetables, these Hillsbus services were operated by Glenorie, even though neither Westbus nor Glenorie buses were used.

In December 2004, all Westbus routes operating out of Northmead and Seven Hills depots, as well as the rest of Glenorie Bus Company, were rebranded Hillsbus. At the same time, Hillsbus took over the operation of Harris Park Transport routes 620 - 630, following the latter ceasing operation. The services were transferred from Hillsbus to Sydney Buses on 28 January 2005. On 25 September 2005, after the purchase of Hillsbus by ComfortDelGro Cabcharge, routes 620, 625, 626, 627 and 630 were transferred back to Hillsbus.

Despite the rebranding to Hillsbus, the new Hillsbus website was only launched in January 2006, about a year after the rebranding. The delay could be related to the debt of Westbus and was only resolved after the sale of Westbus and Hillsbus to CDC. After the launch of the new website, it still did not show any timetables of the former Glenorie-operated timetables until May/June 2006, and during this period, customers were asked to check the Glenorie website instead.

When the Parramatta to Rouse Hill section of the North-West T-way opened on 10 March 2007, routes 730 (renumbered T63) and 735 (renumbered 616, now 616X) were transferred from Busways to Hillsbus with route 718 transferred from Hillsbus to Busways.

On 30 June 2014, the Opal card was rolled out on all of Hillsbus' NightRide and Region 4 routes (including school services).

On 28 July 2019, after the Sydney Metro Northwest opened in May, bus routes in the Hills District were reorganised, with some services rerouted to stop at various Sydney Metro stations.

In November 2022, CDC was awarded the contract to retain Region 4. The Hillsbus branding on buses was gradually replaced by the CDC NSW brand in early 2023, in time for the commencement of the new contract in April 2023.

== Routes ==
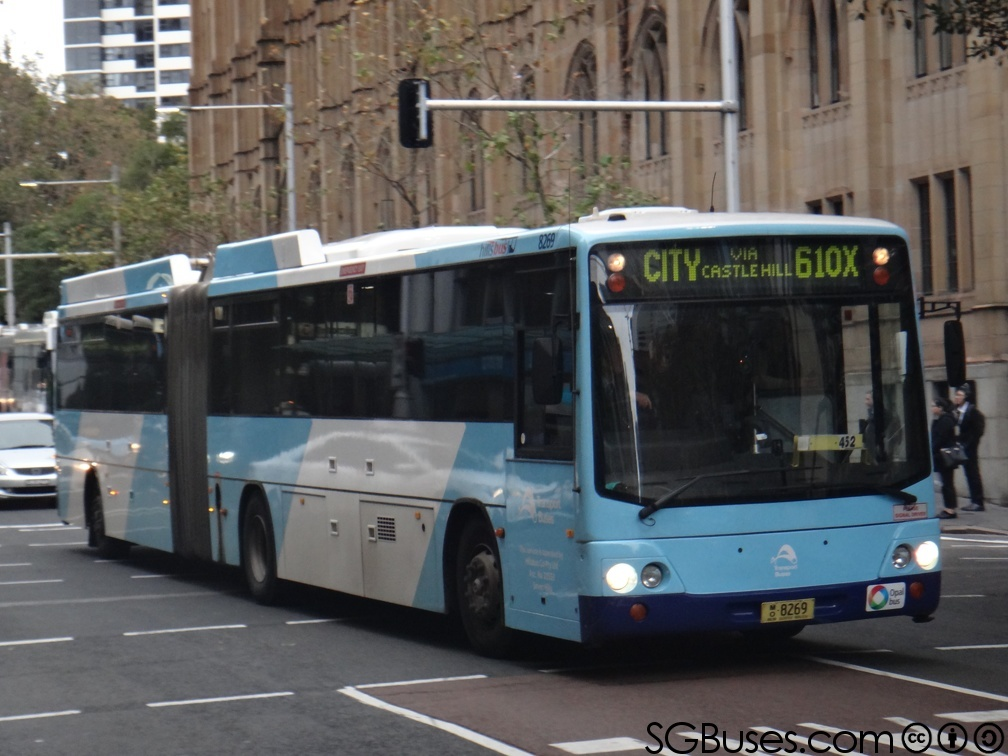
A Custom Coaches CB50 bodied Volvo B10MA on route 610X

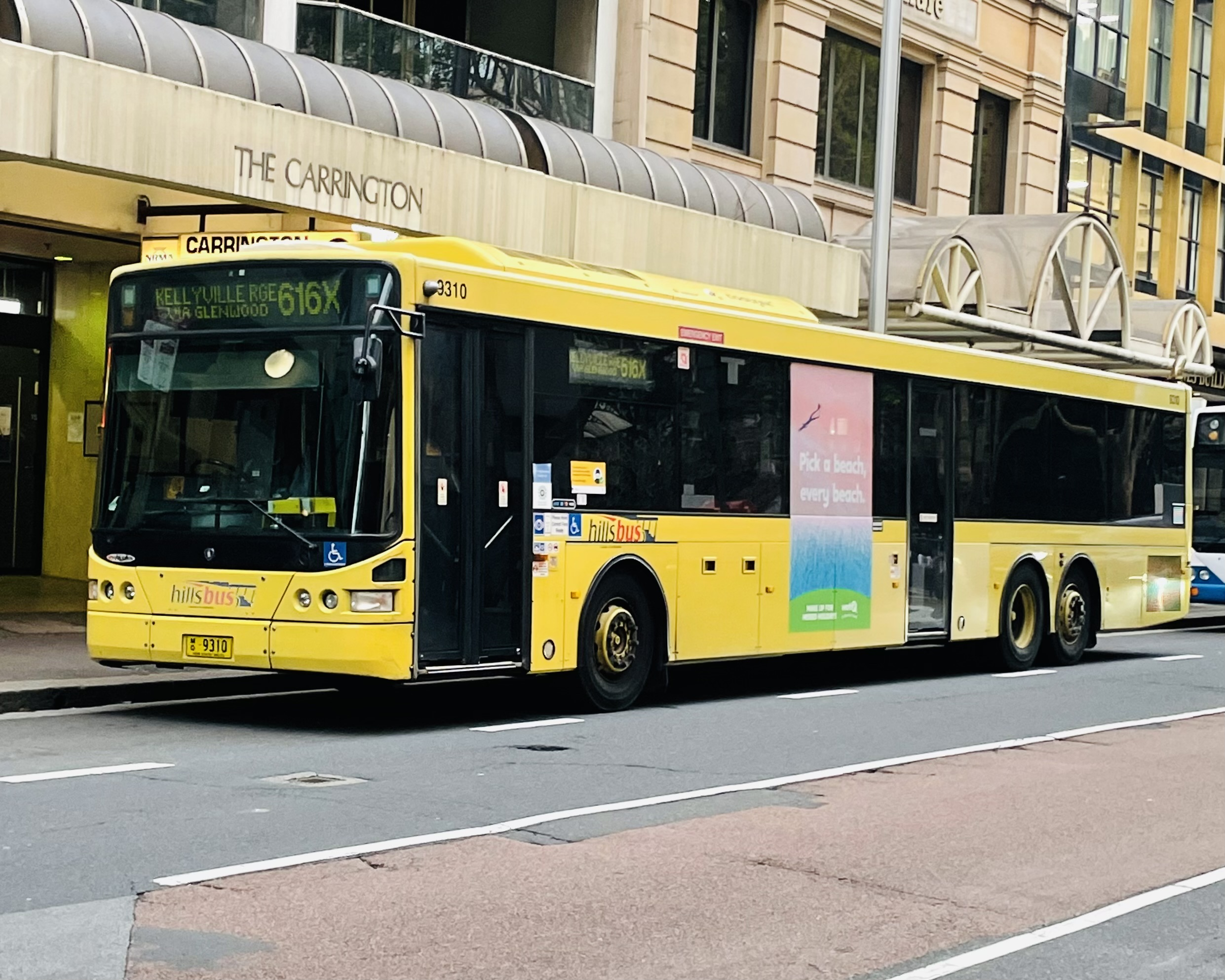
A Volgren CR228L bodied Scania L94UB on route 616X

From 2005 until its replacement by CDC NSW in 2023, Hillsbus' services had formed Sydney Bus Region 4. In August 2013, Hillsbus successfully tendered to operate the Region 4 services for another five years from August 2014.

At the time of cessation, Hillsbus operated the following services:

- 535 from Parramatta to Carlingford (rail replacement bus service)
- Bus routes 600 to 665 in Sydney's north-western suburbs, including
  - 600 (formerly Metrobus M60) from Hornsby to Parramatta
  - 610X (formerly Metrobus M61) from Castle Hill to Queen Victoria Building.
  - 66x series along the North West T-Way (formerly T6x series)
  - Express services along the M2 Hills Motorway and Lane Cove Tunnel to Macquarie Park, North Sydney and Queen Victoria Building
- Bus routes 700 to 715 in Sydney's western suburbs (Wentworthville, Seven Hills, Blacktown)

=== Other railway replacement bus services ===
Hillsbus also operated other railway replacement bus services between 2018 and 2019. Hillbus operated Station Link services (SLx series) between September 2018 and May 2019, while the Epping to Chatswood rail link was closed for upgrading and conversion to Sydney Metro Northwest. It stopped at Epping, Chatswood, Macquarie Park, Eastwood, Macquarie University, Beecroft and St Leonards stations. It was jointly operated with Transdev NSW. The service ceased when the Metro opened in May 2019.

Thereafter, until November 2019, Hillsbus operated the North West Night Bus to supplement the Metro North West Line on Sunday to Wednesday nights. Like Station Link, it was jointly operated with Transdev NSW.

== Fleet ==
=== Depots ===
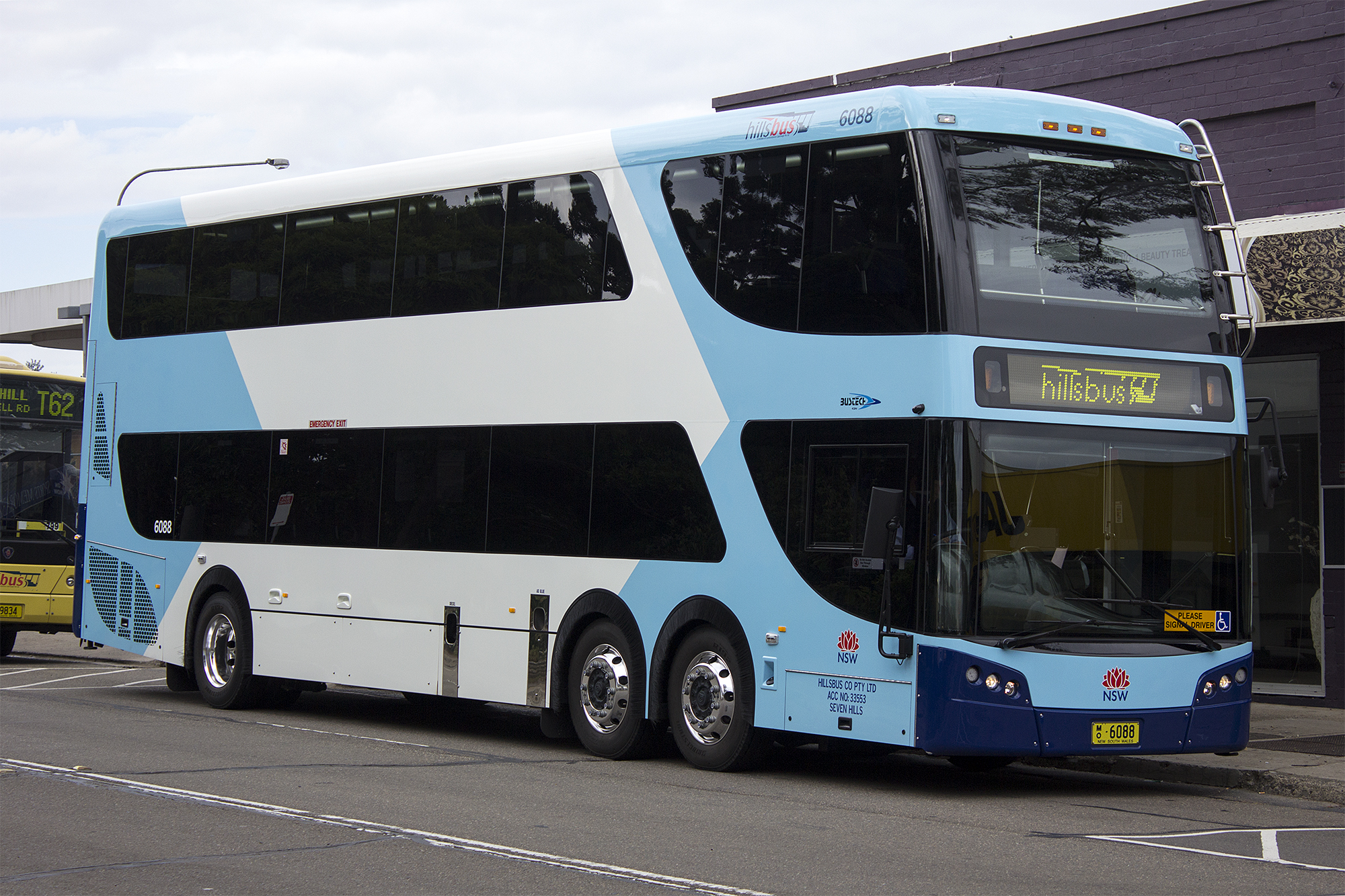
Bustech CDI double-decker in Transport for NSW livery at Castle Hill interchange

As of July 2022, Hillsbus operated 601 buses across four depots:

- Foundry Road (F) in Seven Hills – Head Office of Hillsbus – 204 buses
- Dural (D) – 177 buses
- Northmead (N) – 188 buses
- Seven Hills (V) – another depot also in Seven Hills, smaller than Foundry Road depot – 32 buses

Hillsbus also operated 62 buses at the Camellia depot designated for Station Link between September 2018 and May 2019, but they have since been moved to other Hillsbus, Hunter Valley Buses and Blue Mountains Transit depots after the cessation of Station Link.

=== Livery ===
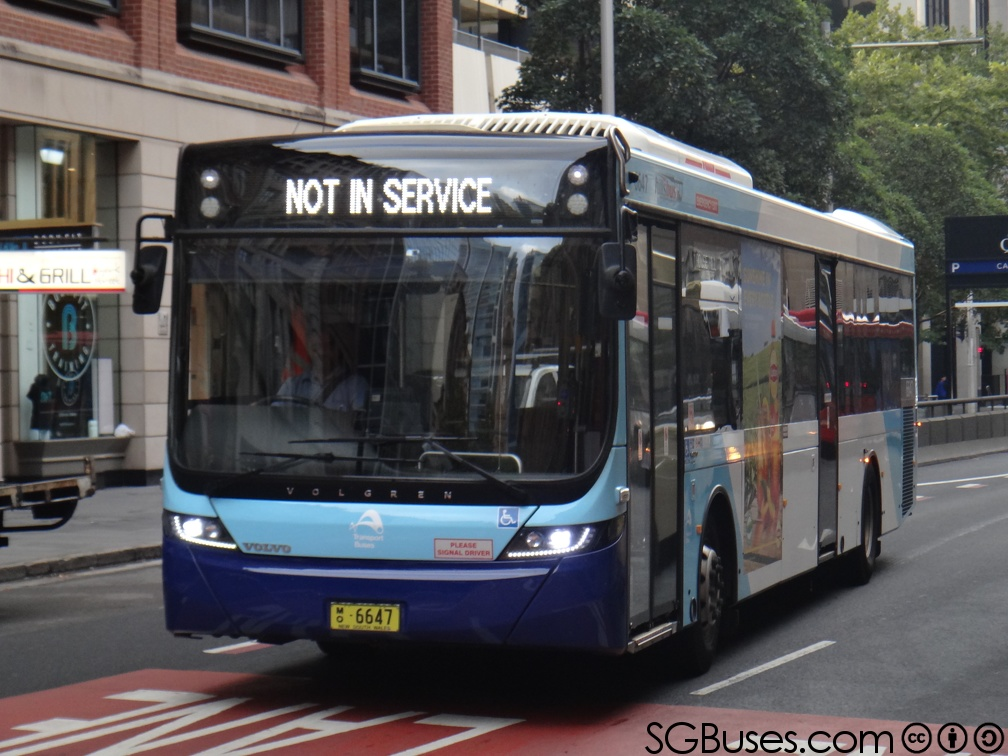
A Volgren Optimus bodied Volvo B7RLE in December 2014

Prior to 2010, Hillsbus adopted Westbus' new plain yellow livery. With the introduction of Metrobus routes, the Metrobus livery was applied to new buses dedicated to Metrobus operations. In 2010, the Transport for NSW white and blue livery began to be applied on new buses and repainted buses. Fleet dedicated for Station Link also carried the Transport for NSW livery but with "Station Link" labels and a pink body front. Most of the Station Link fleet have had the labels and pink front removed after the cessation of Station Link.

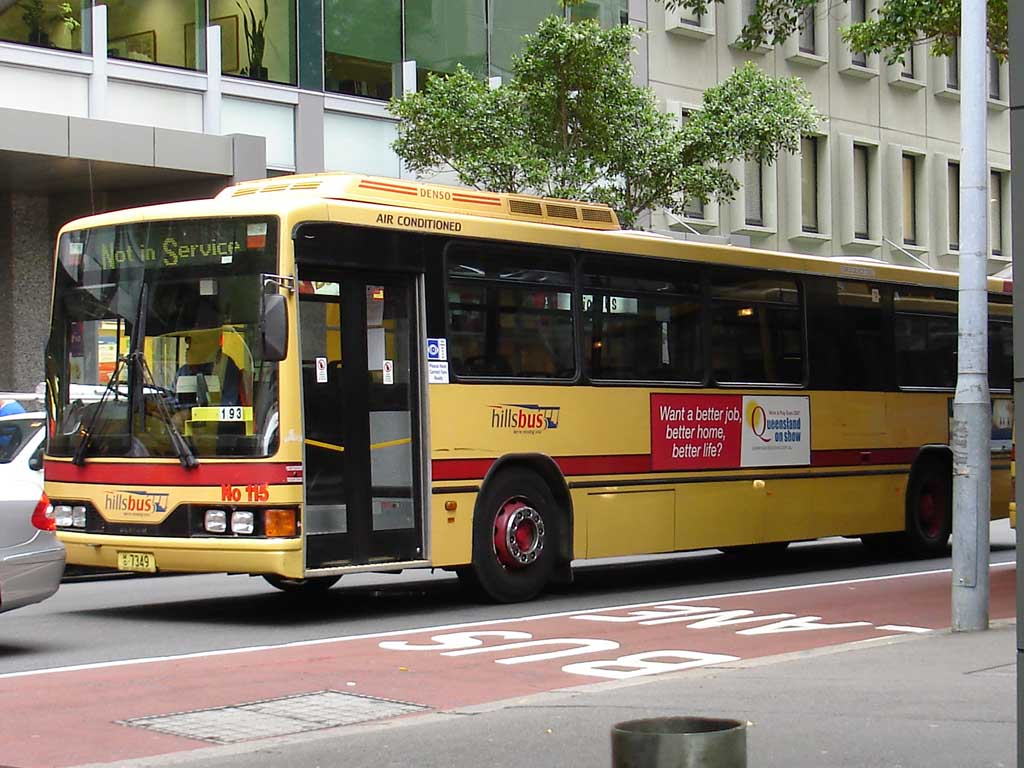
Hillsbus Custom Coaches bodied Mercedes-Benz O405 on Clarence Street painted in original Westbus cream & red livery in October 2007

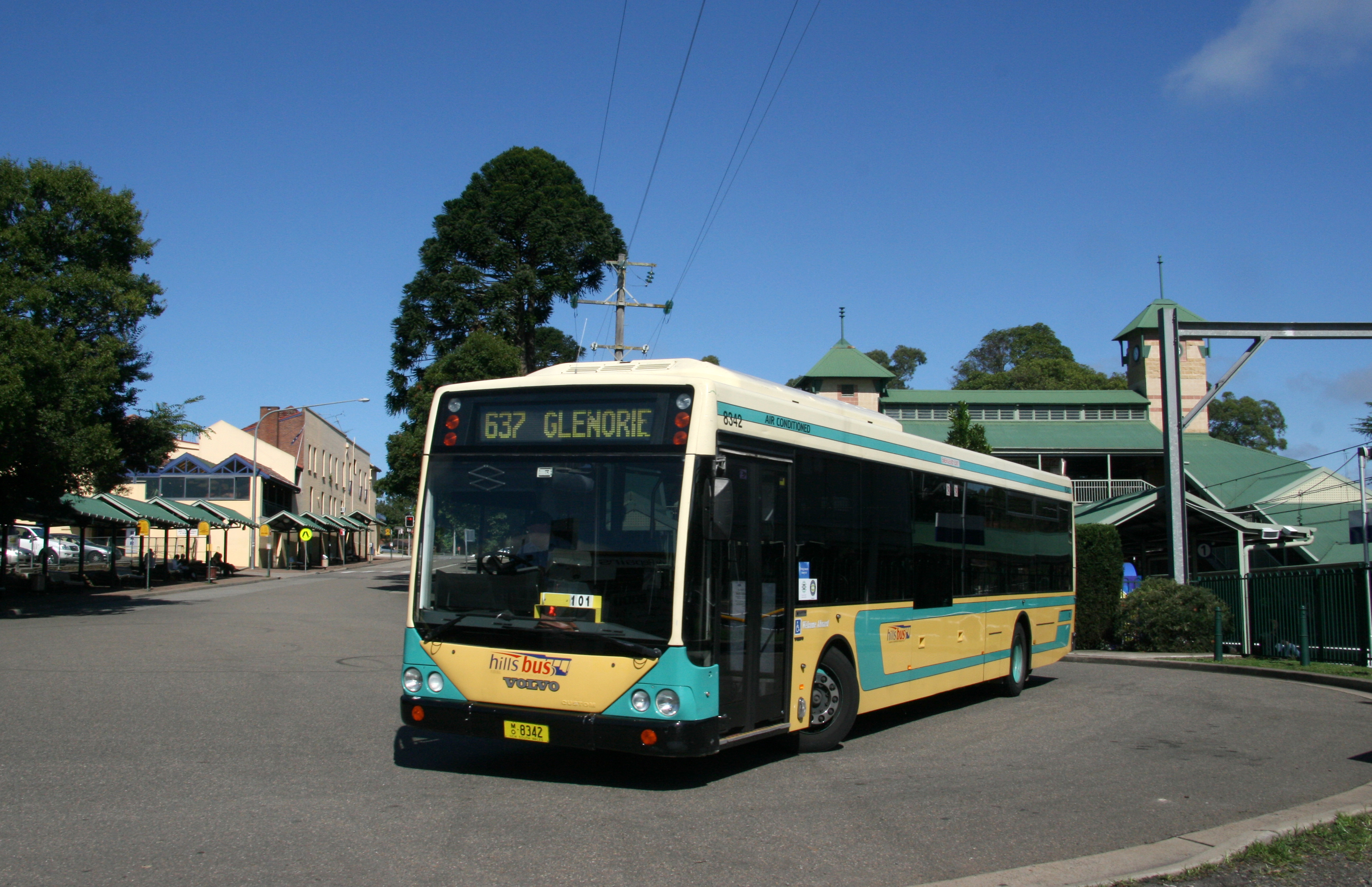
Hillsbus Custom Coaches bodied Volvo B10BLE at Pennant Hills in April 2009, still in the original Glenorie Bus Company livery

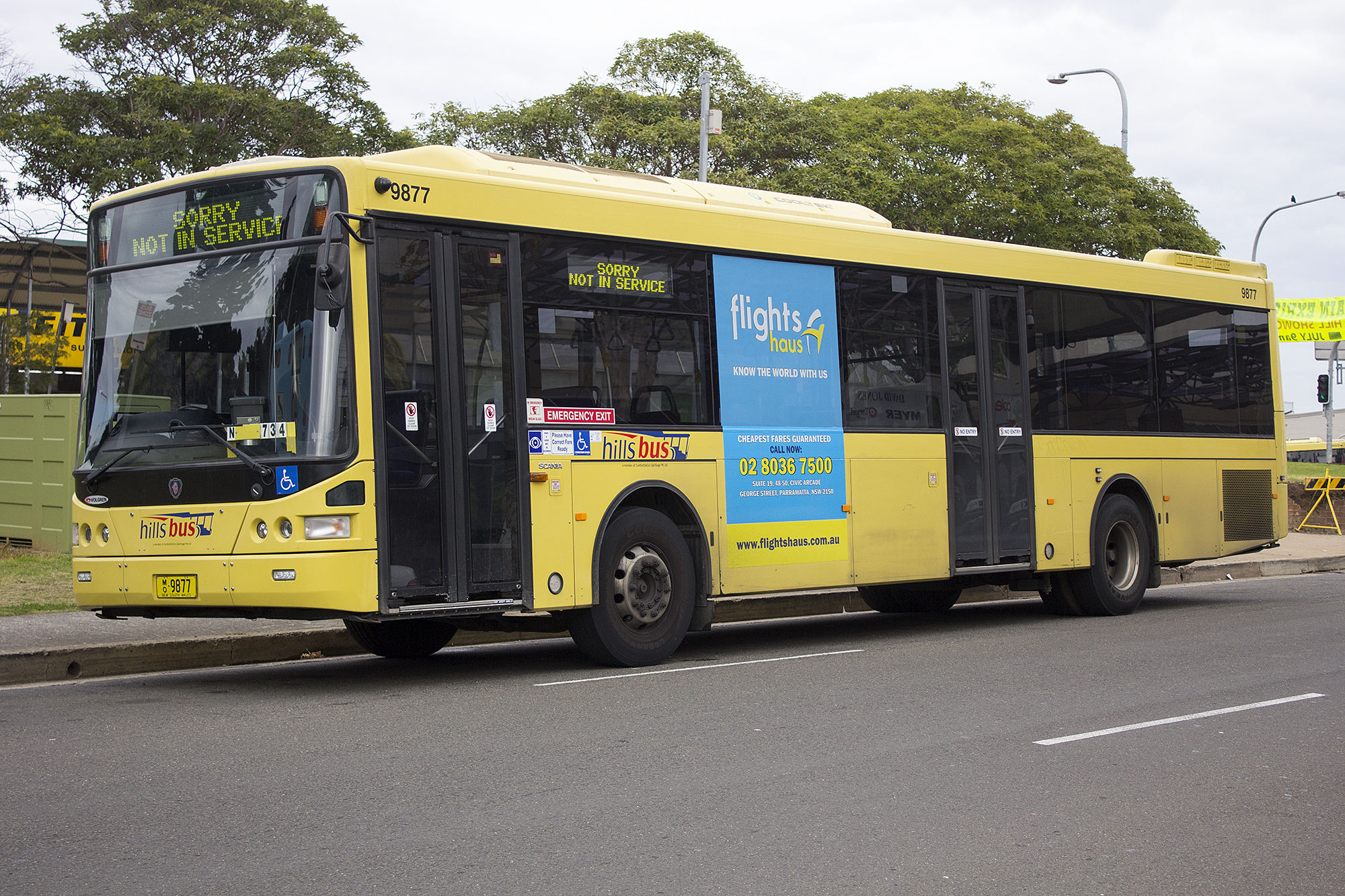
Hillsbus Volgren bodied Scania K230UB at Castle Hill bus interchange in July 2013, in previous yellow livery

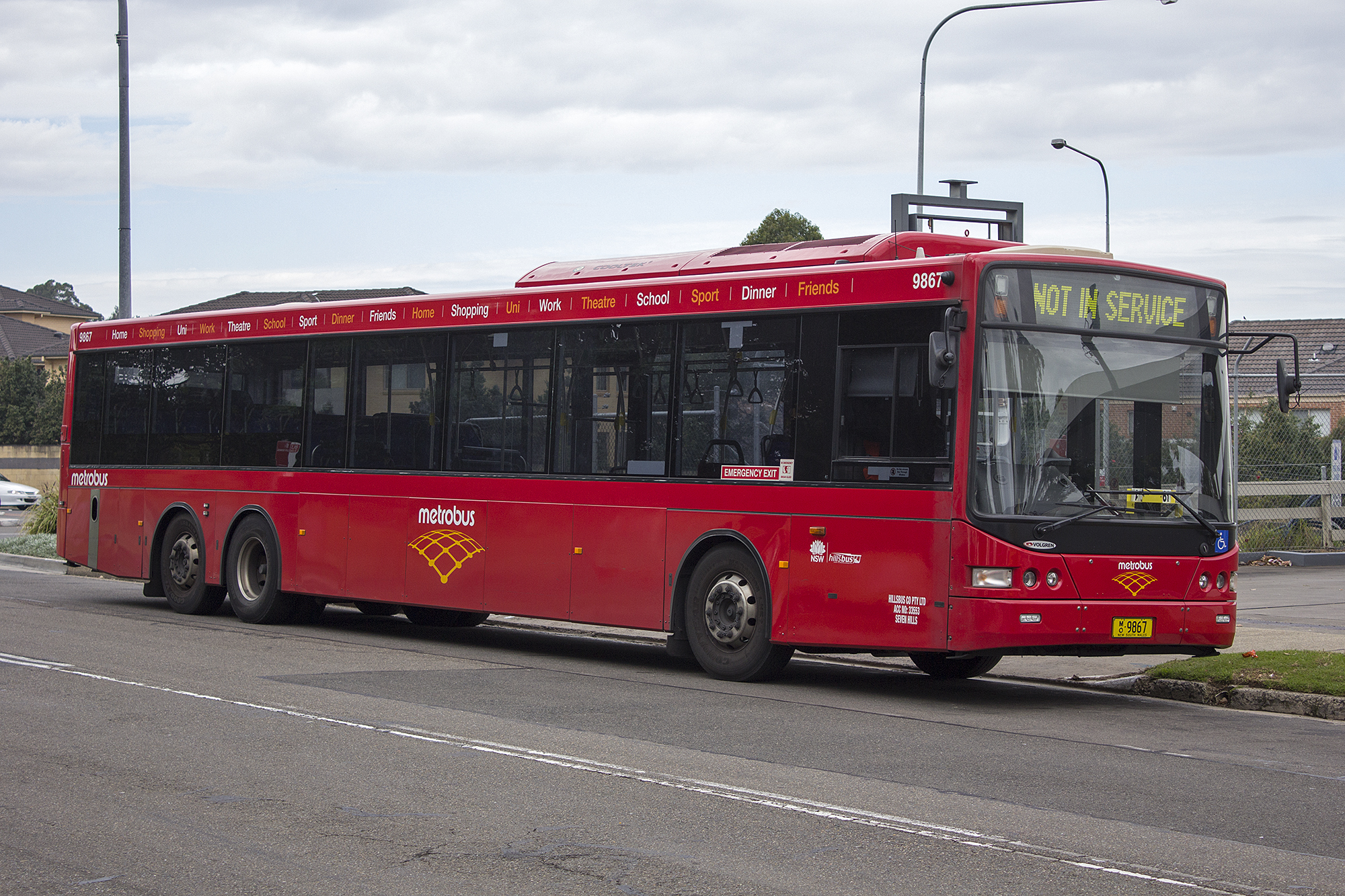
Discontinued Metrobus liveried Hillsbus Volgren CR228L bodied Scania K280UB at Castle Hill bus interchange

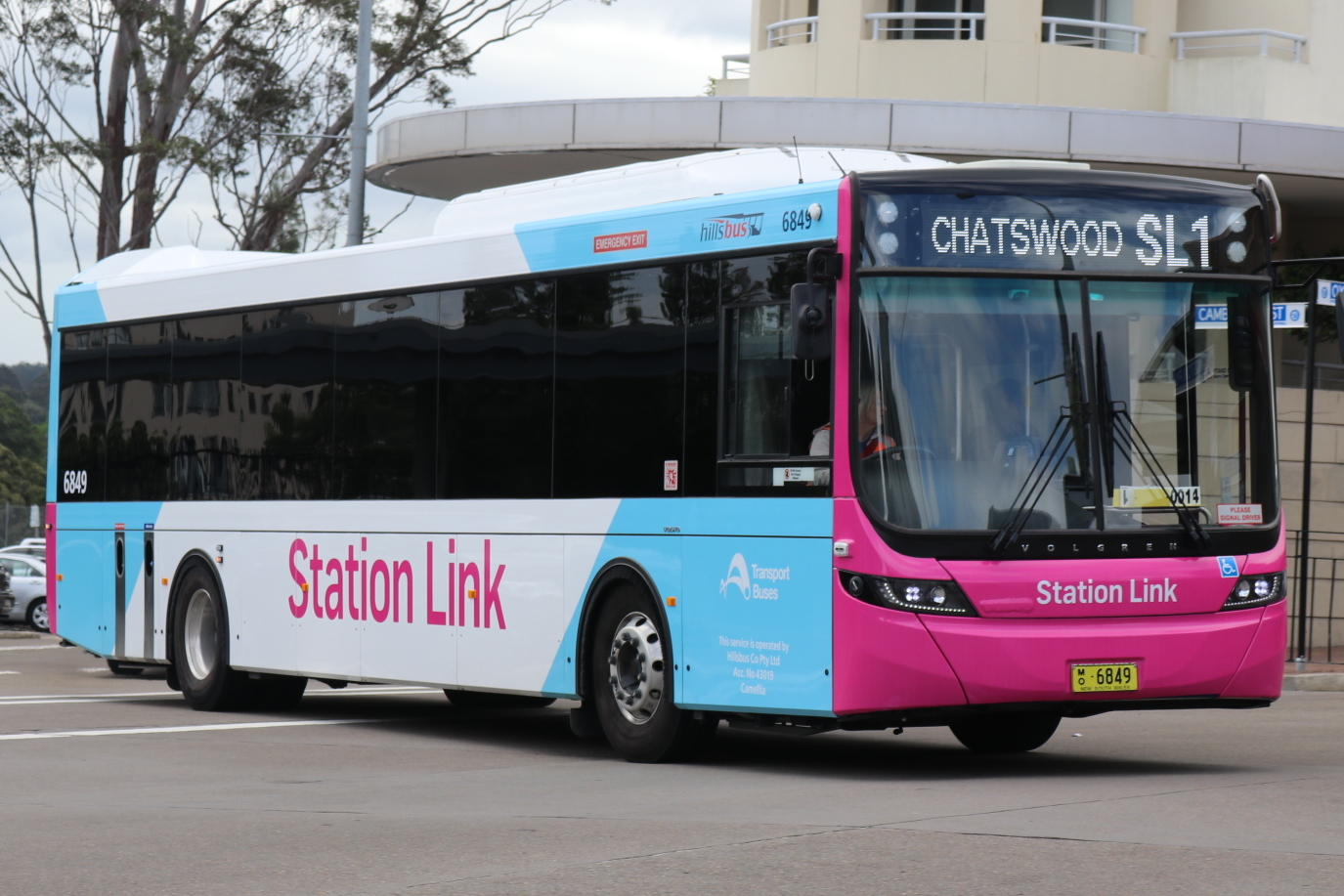
Hillsbus Volgren bodied Volvo B7RLE in Station Link livery

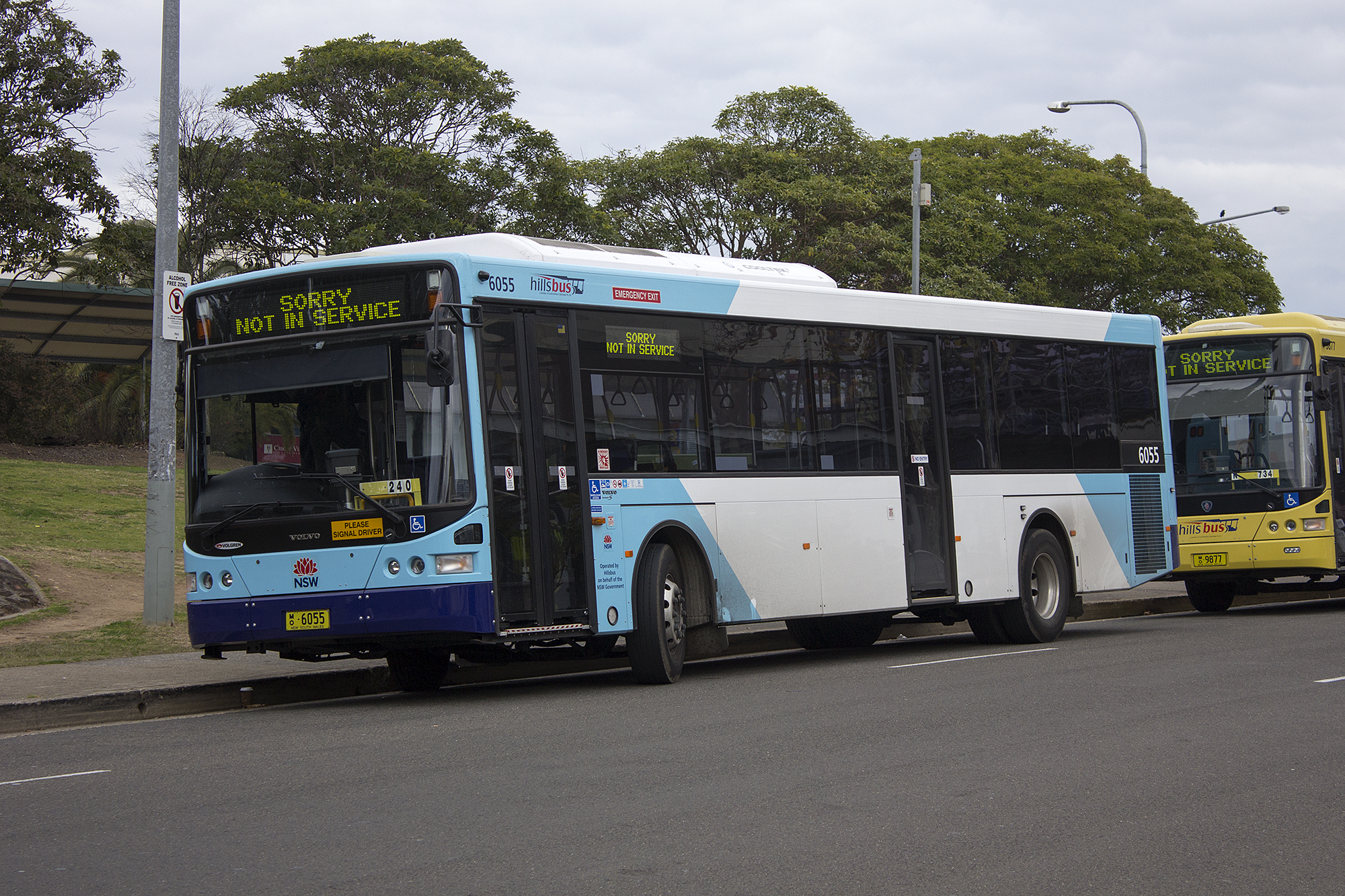
Volgren CR228L bodied Volvo B7RLE at Castle Hill Interchange in Transport for NSW livery
