= Westbus =

Australian bus and coach operator

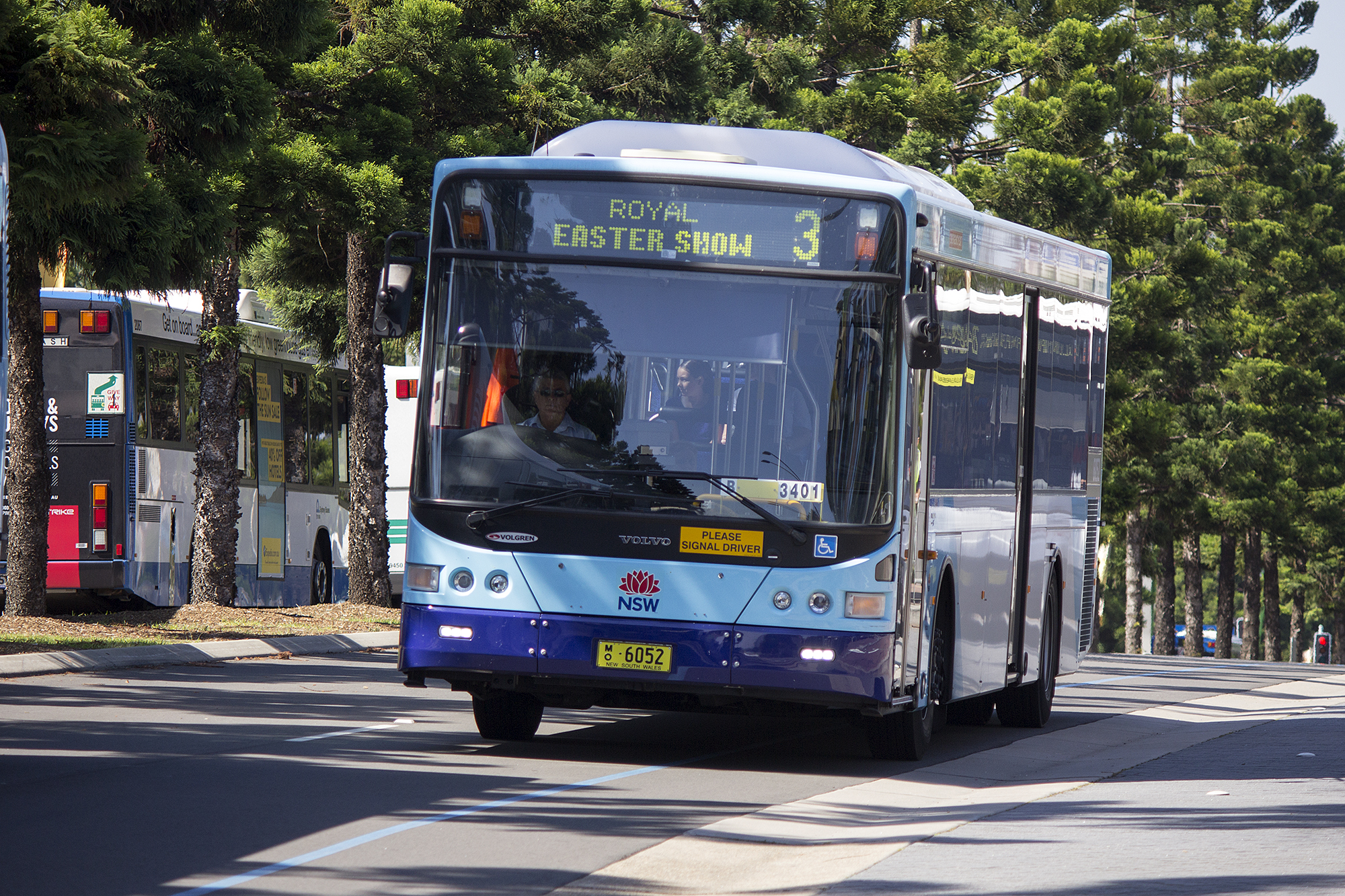
- Westbus Volgren bodied Volvo B7RLE at Sydney Olympic Park in March 2013
- Parent: ComfortDelGro Cabcharge
- Founded: 1955
- Ceased operation: October 2013
- Service area: Western Sydney
- Service type: Bus services
- Depots: Bonnyrigg; Girraween; St Marys; Windsor
- Website: westbus.com.au

Westbus was an Australian bus and coach operator that operated bus services in Western Sydney from 1955 until October 2013. Founded by the Bosnjak family, it later became a subsidiary of National Express and later ComfortDelGro Cabcharge.

== History ==
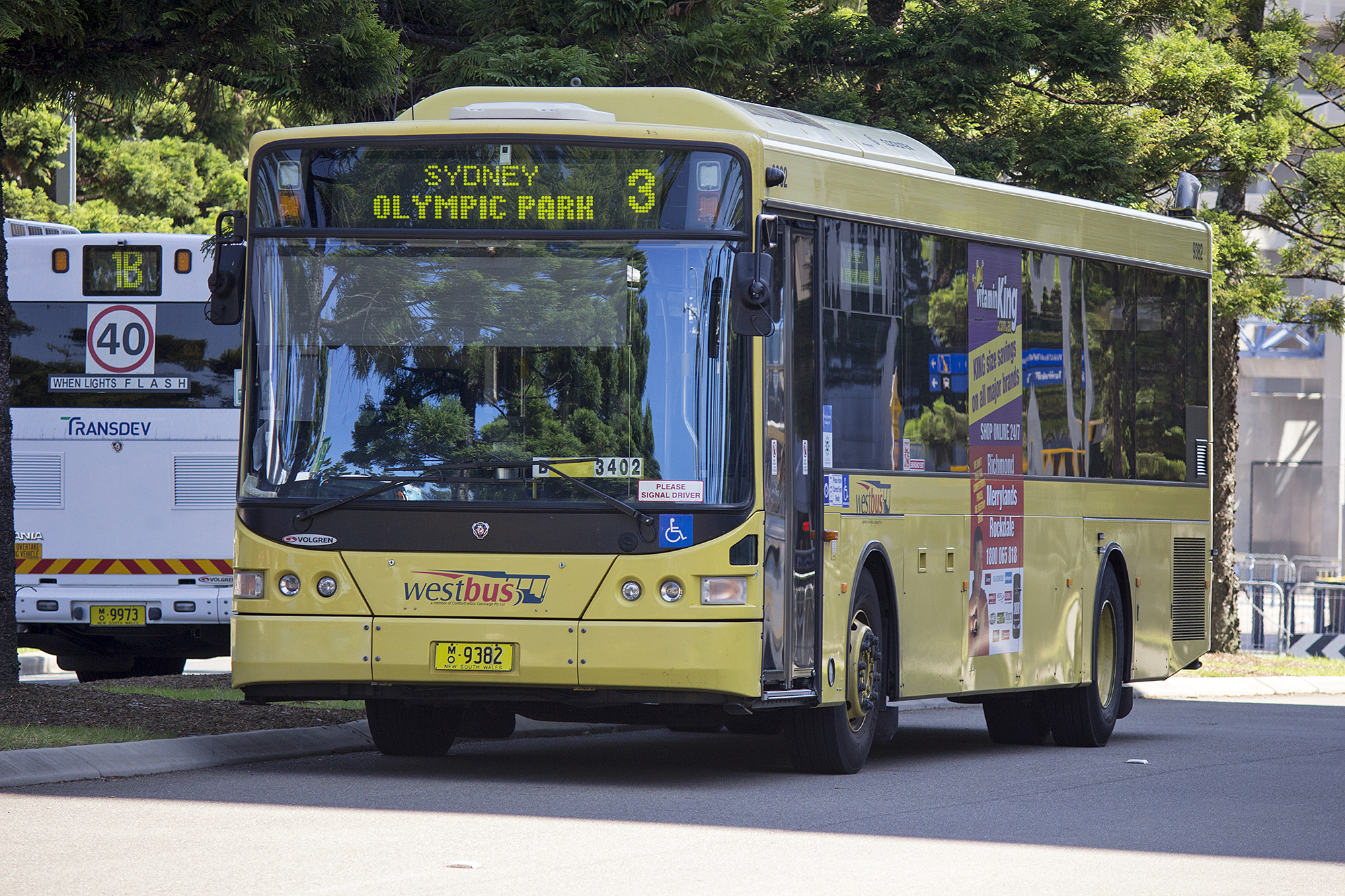
Westbus Volgren bodied Scania K94UB at Sydney Olympic Park in March 2013

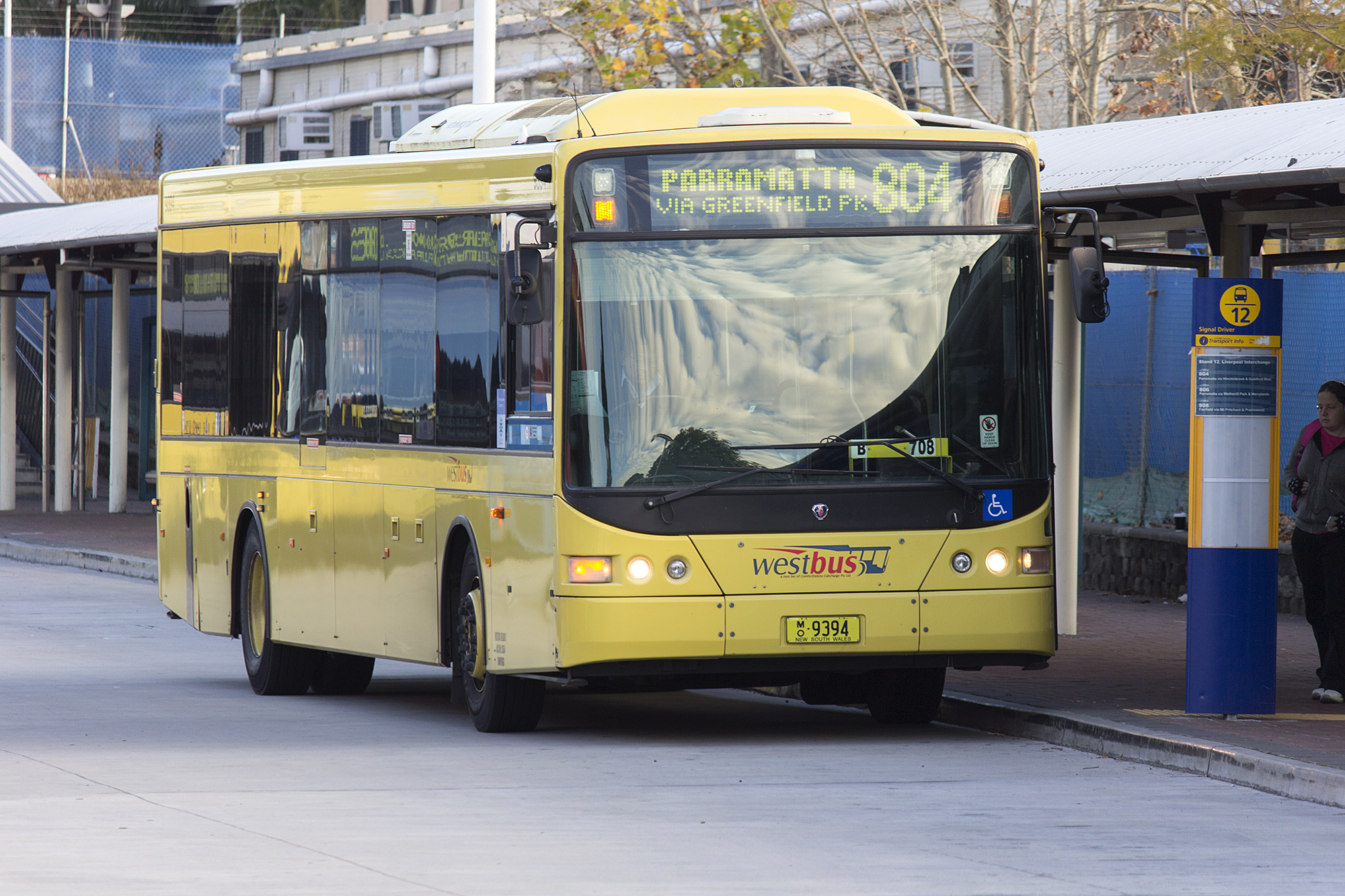
Volgren bodied Scania K94UB at Liverpool Interchange in July 2013

Westbus's history originates from the Bosnjak family, who entered the transport business in 1955 and traded as Bosnjak's Bus Service. At the time, it operated a fleet of five buses on a route connecting the Sydney suburbs of Canley Vale and Edensor Park.

Bosnjak's purchased a number of bus companies:

- 1963: Parramatta Bus Co
- April 1974: WJ Bale & Sons, Penrith
- November 1976: Fairlines Bus Service, Fairfield
- 1981: Cleary Brothers in 1981
- October 1983: Bowman's Bus Lines, St Marys
- 1987: Route 715 from Toongabbie Transport
- December 1987: Macquarie Towns Coach Lines, Windsor
- December 1988: The rest of Toongabbie Transport
- June 1989: Calabro's, Bonnyrigg
- January 1994: Richardson's Bus & Coach Service, Richmond

All companies began to trade as Westbus in October 1984.

In 1985 the coach business of Rowe's was purchased. A fleet of Volvo B10M coaches were purchased and based at Northmead. Following the purchase of Calabro's in June 1989 both fleets moved to Alexandria and later Arncliffe. The operation ceased in the early 2000s.

In the United Kingdom, Westbus Australia took over Swinards Coaches, Ashford, Kent and ADP Travel Services of Hounslow to form Westbus UK in 1986. Since 2005, Westbus UK has continued to exist as a separate entity to Westbus Australia, despite using Westbus Australia's old name, logo and livery, and having the same owners. It is now owned by CityFleet Networks, also a wholly owned subsidiary of ComfortDelGro.

By 1999, 57% shareholding of Westbus was held by Bosnjak Holdings, the main subsidiary of National Bus Company, which is also owned by Jim Bosnjak and his sister-in-law Carol. In May 1999, British coach operator National Express purchased National Bus Company and in turn took the 57% shareholding in Westbus held by National Bus Company. Members of the founding Bosnjak family including Jim continued to hold the remaining shares. Jim Bosnjak also continued to be Chairman of National Bus Company.

In December 2004, Westbus' Northmead and Seven Hills operations were merged with those of the newly acquired Glenorie Bus Company under the Hillsbus brand.

With debts of $90 million and National Express unwilling to provide further funding, in January 2005 the company was placed into voluntary administration. Westbus's problems threatened a major disruption to Sydney's transport network: the company ranked second only to government-owned Sydney Buses in the commuter bus industry. The company was acquired by ComfortDelGro Cabcharge in October 2005. The new owners pledged to honour the company's contractual obligations to customers and staff. The change of ownership saw the company exchange one politically well-connected shareholder, the Bosnjak family, for another, Cabcharge's Reg Kermode.

In August 2006, the routes of Baxter's Bus Lines were purchased by and absorbed into Westbus Region 3 operations. Also included in the sale were Baxter's Girraween depot and some of its bus fleet.

From 2005, Westbus services were part of Sydney Bus Regions 1 and 3. In 2012, these regions were put out to tender by Transport for NSW. Westbus' bids to retain both regions were not successful, with the Region 1 services operating out of St Marys and Windsor passing to Busways, while the Region 3 services operated by Bonnyrigg and Girraween passing to Transit Systems, both in October 2013. The remaining Westbus fleet was transferred to other ComfortDelGro Australia subsidiaries.

== Routes ==
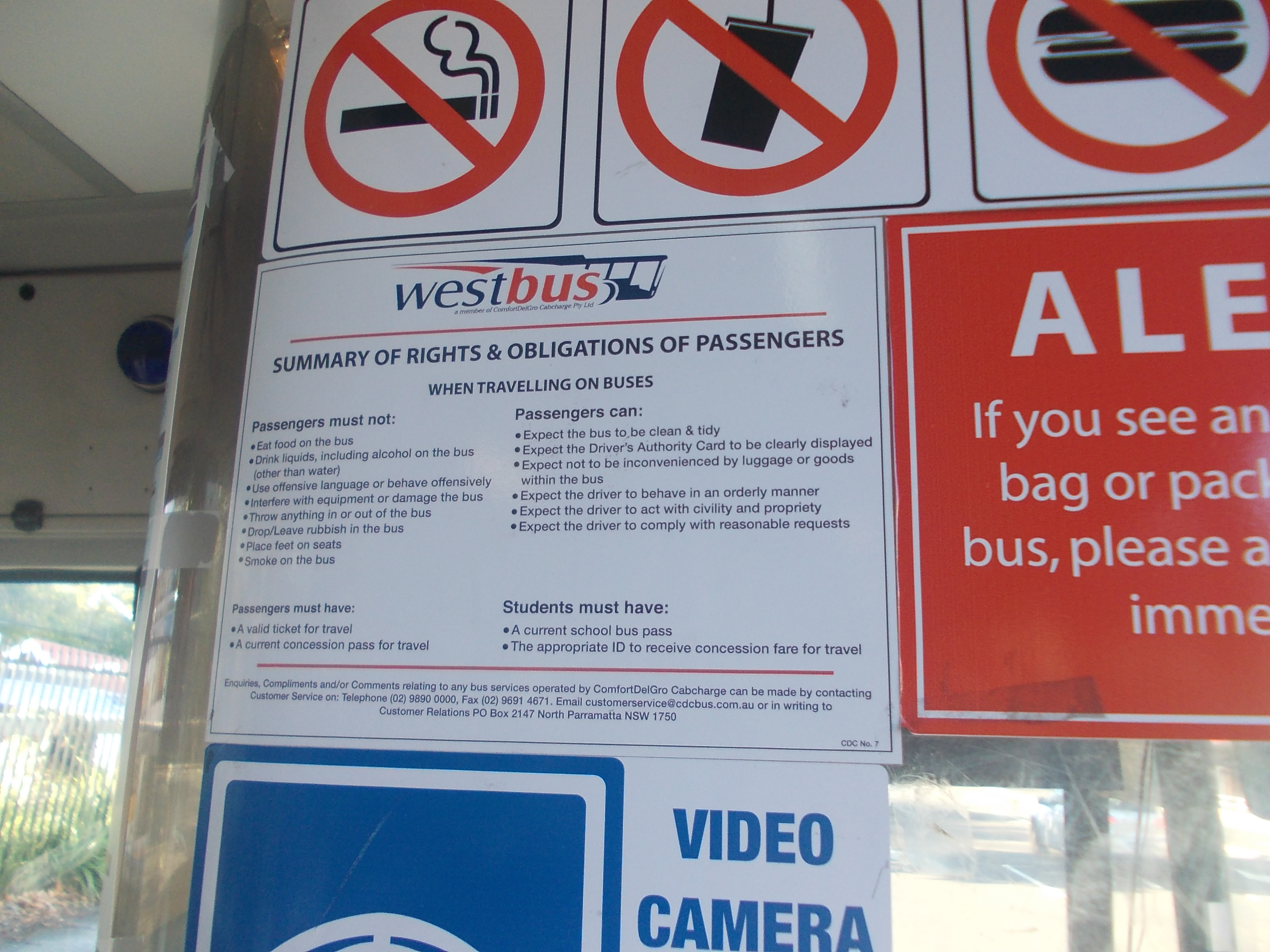
A remnant sticker with the Westbus logo in a Hillsbus vehicle, July 2014

Prior to its cessation in 2013, Westbus operated services in Sydney Bus Regions 1 and 3:

- Region 1:
  - Bus routes 668 to 682 in Sydney's north-western suburbs (Windsor, Richmond, Kurrajong)
  - Bus routes 759, 770 to 799 in Sydney's western suburbs (Penrith, St Marys)
  - Free Penrith Shuttle bus (route 787) from March 2011 to August 2013
- Region 3:
  - Bus routes 802 to 818 in Sydney's south-western suburbs (Parramatta, Merrylands, Liverpool), with routes 802 & 803 jointly operated with Hopkinsons
  - Free Cabramatta Shuttle bus (route 88) from March 2011 to August 2013, jointly operated with Metro-link Bus Lines

Westbus also operated services in the Hills District prior to their rebranding to Hillsbus in December 2004:

- Bus routes 600 to 618 in Sydney's north-western suburbs, including express services along the M2 Hills Motorway to Railway Square
- Red Arrow route 630 from Blacktown to Macquarie Centre. Jointly operated with Harris Park Transport until December 2004
- Bus routes 700 to 718 in Sydney's western suburbs (Wentworthville, Seven Hills, Blacktown)

== Fleet ==
A long time Bedford and Leyland buyer, after briefly manufacturing its own Bosnjak JBJ chassis in the late 1970s, Westbus moved to the Volvo B10M purchasing over 160 as buses and 12 as coaches in the 1980s. It later purchased Mercedes-Benz O405 and Scanias.

As at May 2013, Westbus operated 289 buses across four depots in Bonnyrigg and Girraween for Region 3 and St Marys and Windsor for Region 1. Upon formation in 1983 Westbus adopted a cream and red livery, which was adopted by National Bus Company in 1993. This was simplified in the early 2000s to plain yellow. In 2010 the Transport for NSW white and blue livery began to be applied in line with contractual obligations.
