= Harris Park Transport =

Former Australian bus operator

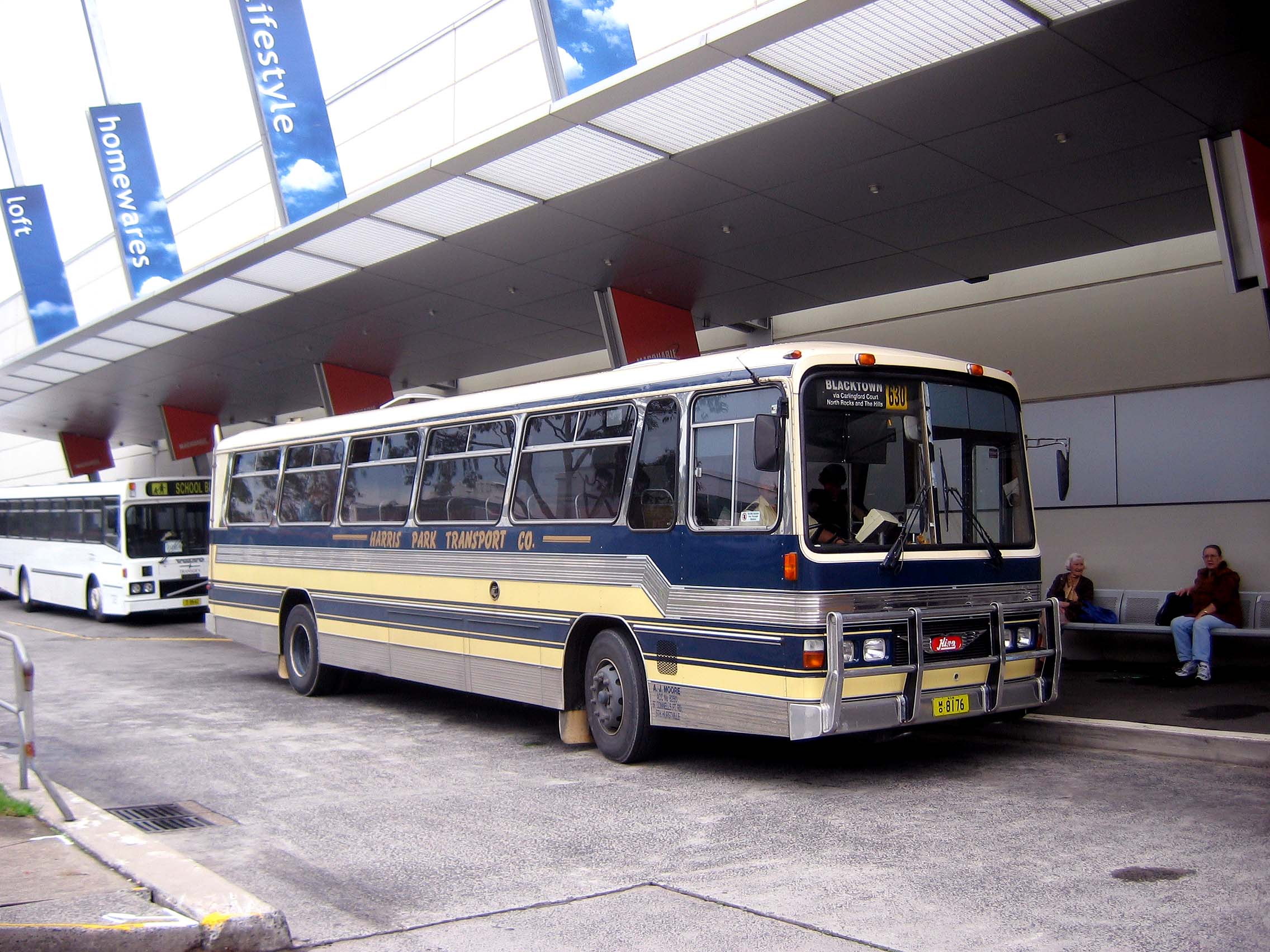
- A Custom Coaches bodied Hino CM277 at Macquarie Centre, October 2004
- Parent: Moore family
- Commenced operation: 1931
- Ceased operation: 21 December 2004
- Headquarters: Harris Park
- Service area: Hills District; Southern Sydney
- Service type: Bus operator
- Routes: 10 (December 2004)
- Depots: 3
- Fleet: 72 (December 2004)
- Chief executive: Nadine Thornburn (née Moore)
- Website: www.citybusdirect.com.au

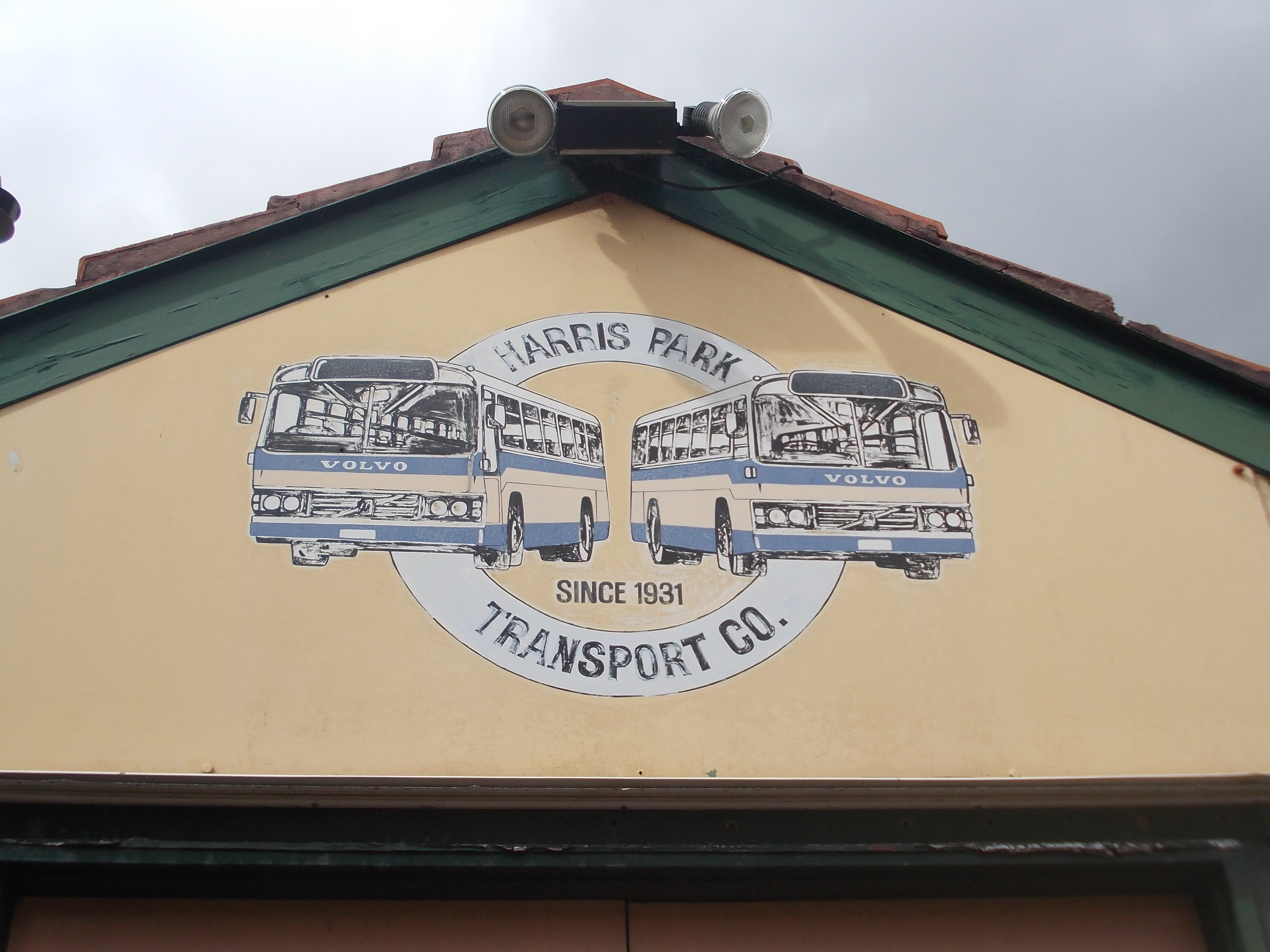
Logo at the former depot building in Harris Park, September 2014

Harris Park Transport was an Australian bus company operating services in the Hills District and Southern suburbs of Sydney.

== History ==
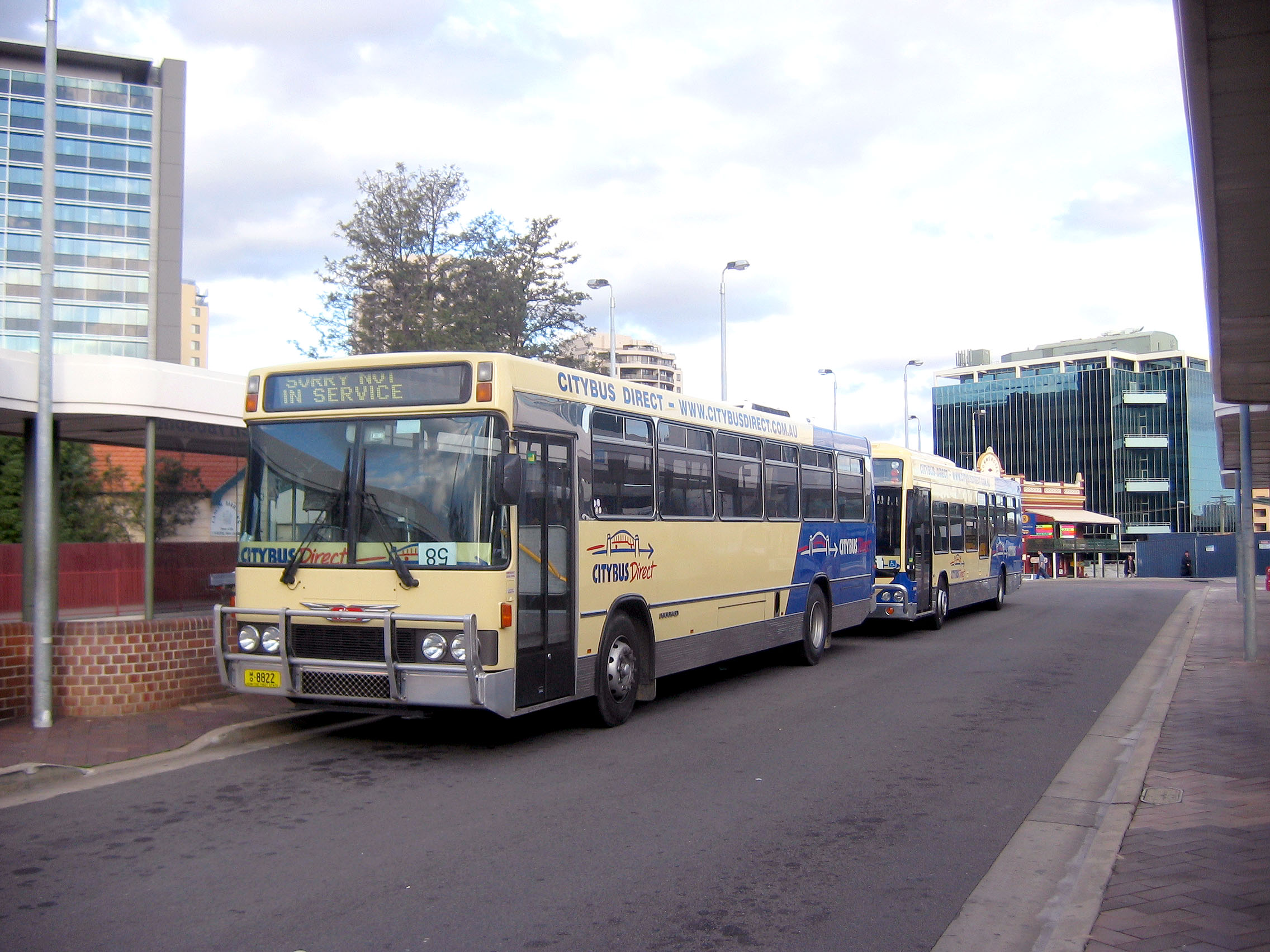
A Hino CM277K and a Mercedes Benz O405NH, both Custom Coaches bodied with CityBus Direct liveries, at Parramatta, September 2004

Harris Park Transport operated buses under a variety of trading names including Carlingford Bus Service, AJ Moore and Sutherland Bus Service. By the late 1990s, all had been consolidated under the Harris Park Transport and AJ Moore brands.

=== Hills District ===
Harris Park Transport was founded in 1931 when Jeff Moore entered a partnership with Harry Howell to operate route 165 from Northmead to Epping via Parramatta. In 1945, in partnership with GR Sinclair, Moore purchased route 82 Epping to Carlingford.

In 1945 Moore formed Parramatta – Epping Bus Service and purchased route 101 Parramatta to Pennant Hills. Route 82 was sold to Ritcher Bros in December 1947, it would be bought back in December 1973.

In 1952 Parramatta – Epping Bus Service commenced operating route 90 Epping to Carlingford that was later extended to Beecroft, North Rocks and Parramatta. In 1958 the business was renamed Harris Park Transport.

Further purchases were the business of Watson & Hume in May 1964, Nicholson Bros' route 191 Beecroft to Dural in July 1982 and East Parramatta Bus Lines' route 3 Parramatta – East Parramatta loop in February 1984. The latter was sold to North & Western Bus Lines in January 1994.

In December 1981, Red Arrow route 590 commenced between Blacktown and Macquarie Centre as a joint operation between Westbus and Harris Park's Carlingford Bus Service subsidiary. The route was renumbered 630 in September 1987.

The Carlingford Bus Service brand didn't last long and was replaced by the Harris Park Transport name.

In June 1997 the other routes were reorganised and renumbered. At this point of time, routes in the Hills District that Harris Park Transport operated were:

- 623: Parramatta – North Rocks – Beecroft
- 624: Parramatta – Carlingford – Epping
- 625: Parramatta – Carlingford – Pennant Hills
- 626: Pennant Hills – Cherrybrook
- 627: Parramatta – Carlingford – Cherrybrook
- 628: Epping – North Carlingford
- 629: Epping – North Rocks
- 630: Blacktown – Macquarie Centre (jointly operated with Westbus)

In mid 2002, Harris Park Transport commenced operating services under the CityBus Direct brand via the M2:

- 620: Dural – Queen Victoria Building
- 621: North Parramatta – Queen Victoria Building
- 622: Oatlands – Queen Victoria Building

On 8 October 2004, routes 621 and 622 ceased, leaving route 620 as the only CityBus Direct route.

=== Southern Sydney ===
Meanwhile, in December 1946, Moore's son Archie, trading as AJ Moore, purchased routes 74 and 106 from Hurstville to Kyle Bay and Connells Point. In March 1950, route 146 Mortdale station to West Oatley was purchased followed in October 1951 by route 116 Hurstville station to Oatley. Both operated under the Sandy Beach Bus Co name, which was named after a popular swimming spot in Oyster Bay. In June 1957, route 116 was incorporated into route 146. In December 1987, route 146 was partly replaced by route 115, which was operated by Archie's son Trevor's Moore's Tours business.

On 1 April 1996, routes 74 and 106 were combined to form route 74/106 Hurstville - Kyle Bay - Connells Point.

In May 1959, the business of Sutherland Bus Service was purchased with routes 100 Sutherland to Gymea Bay and 130 Sans Souci to Yowie Bay. In December 1990 these two routes were sold to Southtrans.

== Cessation ==
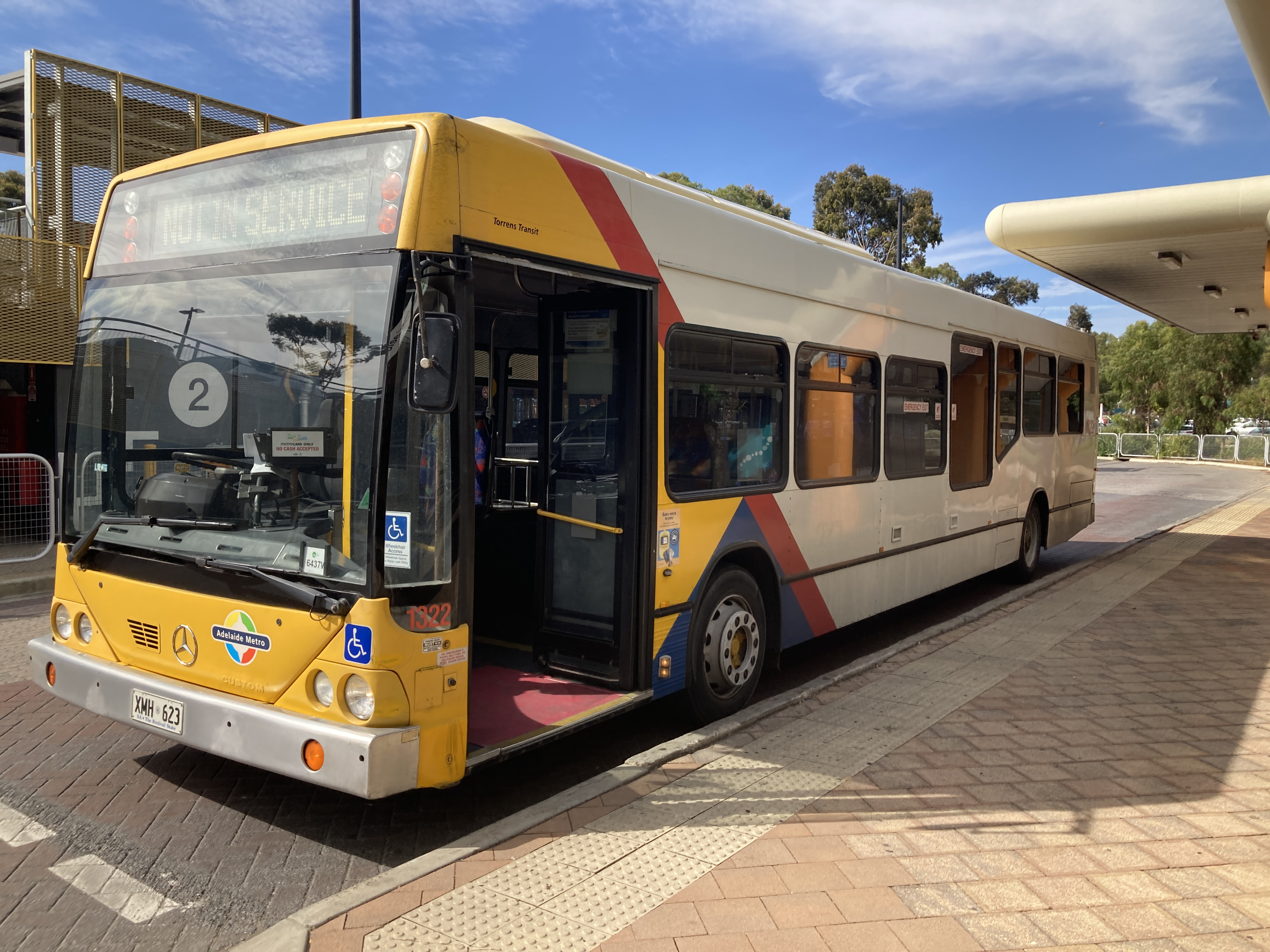
A former Harris Park Transport bus operated by Torrens Transit in Adelaide, November 2024

Harris Park Transport ceased operations after 21 December 2004, after giving the NSW Ministry of Transport notice of its intention not to renew its contracts, citing dissatisfaction with industry reforms being proposed.

As an interim measure, the Hills District services were taken over by Hillsbus. On 28 January 2005, these services were taken over by Sydney Buses, with 630 jointly operated with Hillsbus. Following further negotiations after ComfortDelGro Cabcharge's purchase of Hillsbus, routes 620, 625, 626, 627 and 630 were transferred back to Hillsbus as part of Sydney Bus Region 4 on 25 September 2005, with the remainder staying with Sydney Buses as part of Region 7. Route 624 later became Sydney Buses route 548, and then upgraded to Metrobus route M54 and extended to Macquarie Park in 2010.

Route 74/106, along with Moore's Tours route 954, was taken over by Punchbowl Bus Company and incorporated into Region 5, with the former renumbered 953. Harris Park Transport remained as a charter operator under the name CharterBus Direct. This had ceased by 2007.

Five air-conditioned buses used for the CityBus Direct services were sold in 2006 to Adelaide bus operator Torrens Transit, and as of November 2024, the buses continue to be used for route services over there.

== Tickets and fares ==
Prior to the cessation of CityBus Direct services, the stored-value CBD Easy card was accepted on these services as an alternative to cash. The cards became invalid after the transfer of these services to Hillsbus.

== Fleet ==
When operations ceased in December 2004, the fleet consisted of 72 buses. Fleet livery was cream and dark blue.

== Depots ==
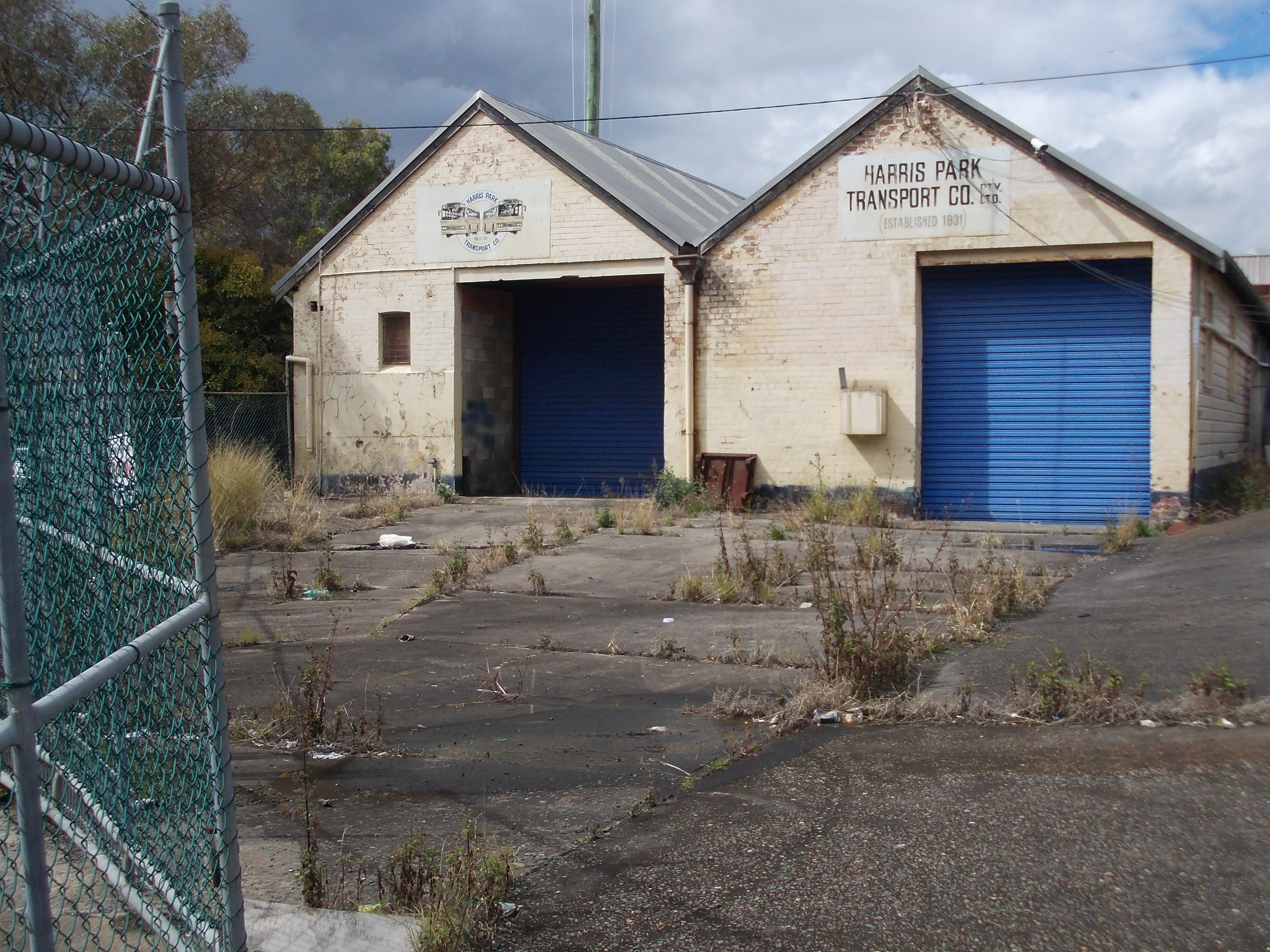
Former depot sheds at the depot in Harris Park, September 2014

Harris Park Transport had depots in Harris Park, North Rocks and South Hurstville. The former Sutherland Bus Service depot in Gymea Bay was retained to store out of use buses. The depot in Harris Park has been demolished in 2015 for residential development.
