= Glenorie Bus Company =

Defunct Australian bus company

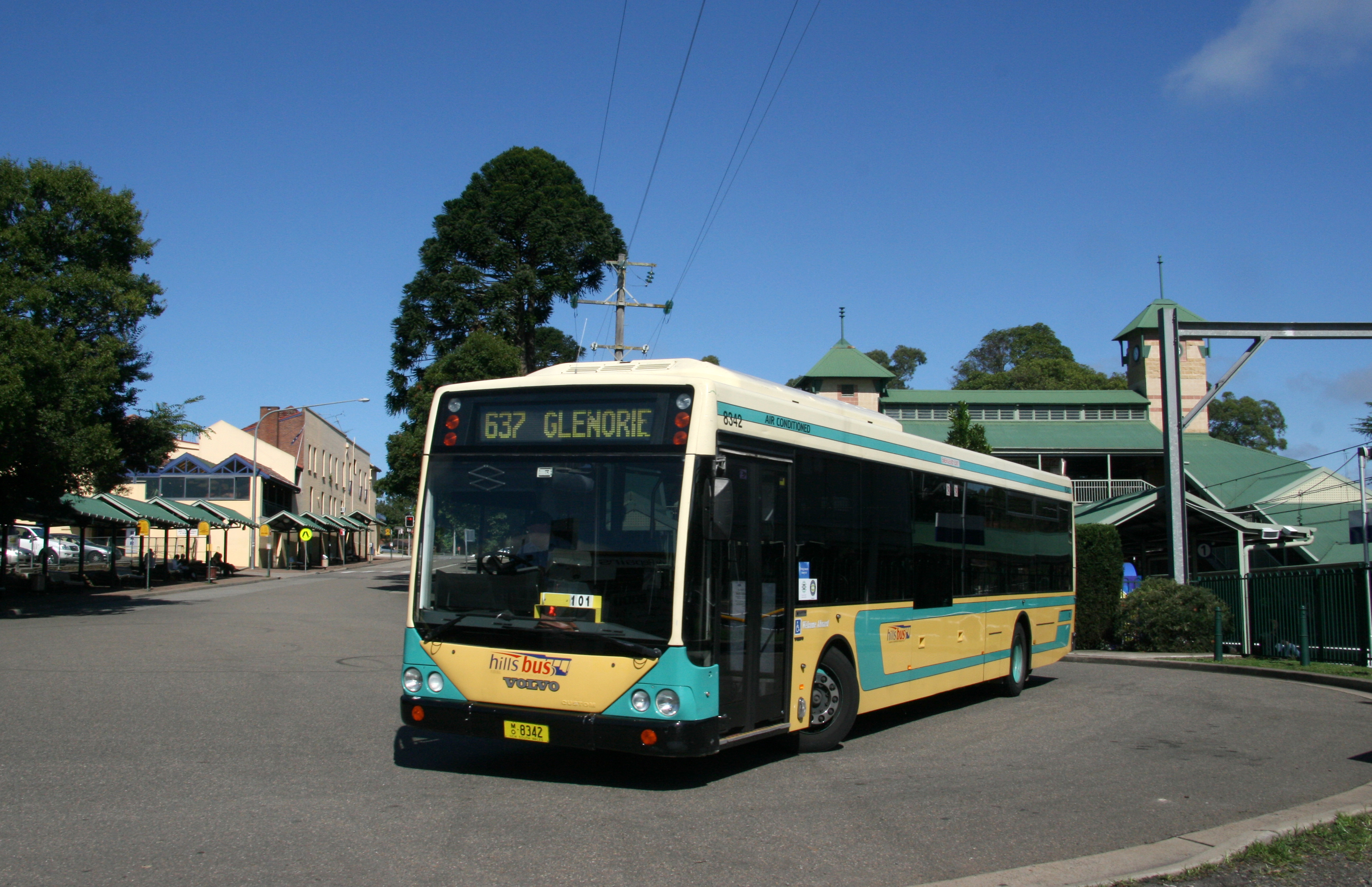
- Hillsbus Custom Coaches bodied Volvo B10BLE, still in Glenorie livery, April 2009
- Parent: Todd Family (until 2001); National Express Group (2001–2004)
- Commenced operation: 1920s
- Ceased operation: December 2004
- Headquarters: Dural
- Service area: Hills District
- Service type: Bus services
- Depots: 1
- Fleet: 95 (May 2005)
- Website: www.glenoriebus.com.au

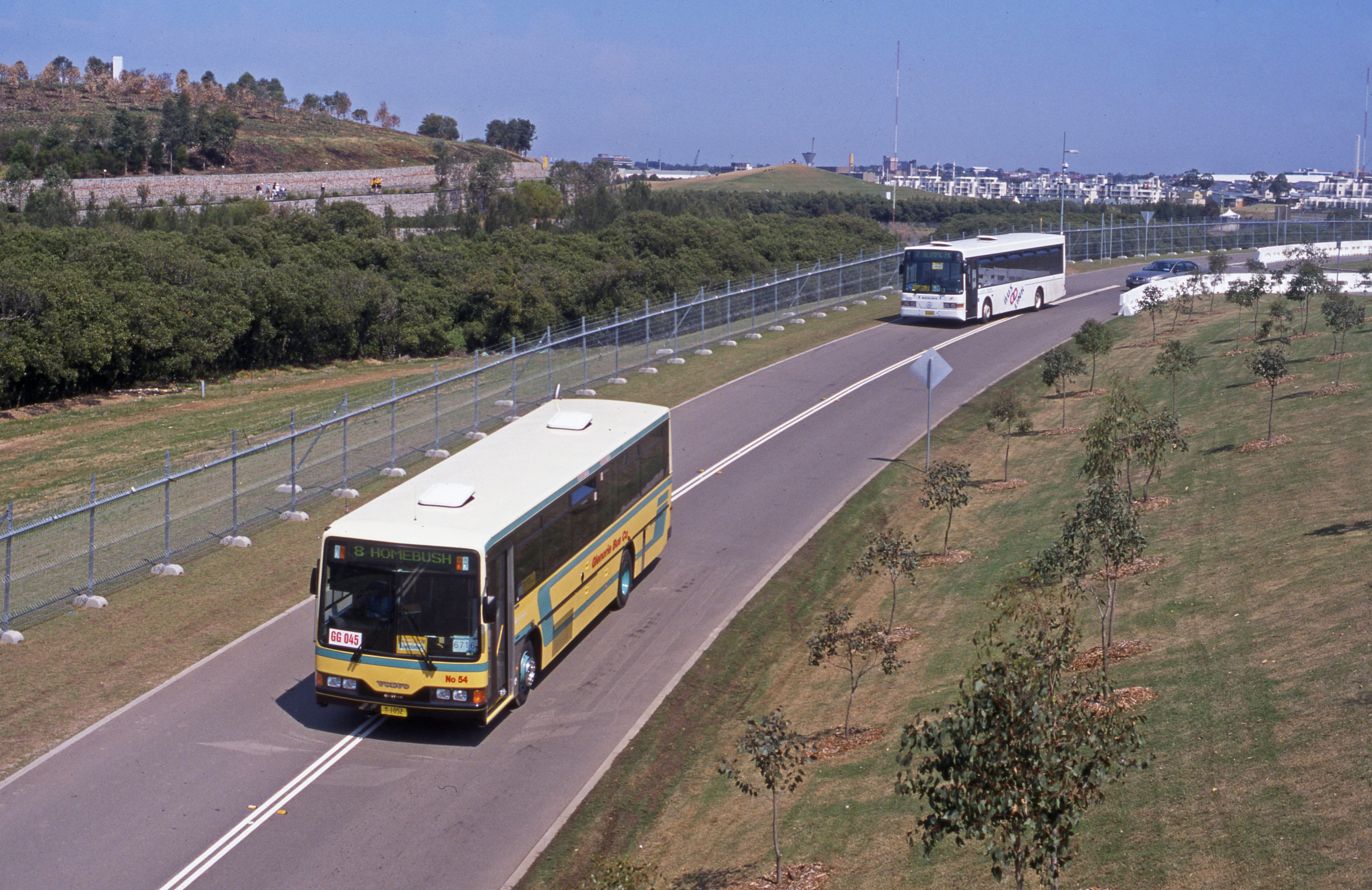
Custom Coaches bodied Volvo B10M during the Sydney Olympic Games, September 2000

Glenorie Bus Company was an Australian bus company in the Hills District of Sydney.

== History ==
Bus services in the Glenorie area commenced in the 1920s when George Deaman began operating. In 1952, Deaman sold out to Roy Baxter and George Tucknott. In 1975, the business was sold to Laurie and Keith Todd with 16 buses. In April 1988, Dural Busways was purchased.

In December 2001, Glenorie was purchased by National Express but the business was not merged with its neighbouring Westbus operation. Instead it operated on its own until December 2004, when Glenorie, along with Westbus routes that operated out of Seven Hills and Northmead depots, were all rebranded Hillsbus.

The following are the routes that were operated by Glenorie prior to their rebranding to Hillsbus.

- 631: Hornsby – Pennant Hills – Castle Hill via Castle Hill Road
- 632: Hornsby – Pennant Hills – Castle Hill via David Road
- 633: Pennant Hills – Castle Hill via Coonara Avenue
- 634: Pennant Hills – Castle Hill – Castlewood Estate
- 635: Macquarie Centre – Beecroft – West Pennant Hills Valley – Castle Hill
- 636: Pennant Hills – Castle Hill – Glenhaven
- 637: Pennant Hills – Castle Hill – Glenorie
- 638: Pennant Hills – Castle Hill – Berrilee
- 639: Pennant Hills – Castle Hill – Kenthurst (Pitt Town Road)
- 640: Pennant Hills – Castle Hill – Kenthurst (Porters Road)
- 641: Pennant Hills – Castle Hill – Annangrove Road

The Hillsbus brand actually existed since 2002 as a joint venture between Westbus and Glenorie. Hillsbus introduced a new route 642 on 11 February 2002 between Dural and the city. Hillsbus introduced another three routes from West Pennant Hills to the city on 8 July that year, All four routes operated under the Hillsbus brand. These express routes operated via the M2 and were known as "M2 City" express services. These routes, though operated by Glenorie according to timetables, did not use Westbus or Glenorie buses.

The "M2 City" routes that Glenorie operated were:

- 642: Dural – Cherrybrook – City via M2 (operates as Hillsbus)
- 650: West Pennant Hills – City via M2 (operates as Hillsbus)
- 652: West Pennant Hills – City via M2 (operates as Hillsbus)
- 654: Dural – West Pennant Hills – City via M2 (operates as Hillsbus)

== Glenorie Coaches ==
In late 2009, a coach charter company was formed under the name Glenorie Coaches using the same cream and aqua as previously carried by Glenorie Bus Company.
