= Northmead European rock carvings =

European Rock carvings
- Location within New South Wales Location within Australia
- 33.7734°S 150.9983°E
- Location: 226 (rear) Windsor Road, Northmead, City of Parramatta, New South Wales, Australia

New South Wales Heritage Register
- Official name: European Rock carvings
- Type: state heritage (archaeological-terrestrial)
- Designated: 2 April 1999
- Reference no.: 680
- Type: Rock Engraving
- Category: Exploration, Survey and Events

Northmead European Rock carvings is a heritage-listed rock engraving at 226 (rear) Windsor Road, Northmead, City of Parramatta, New South Wales, Australia. It was added to the New South Wales State Heritage Register on 2 April 1999.

== History ==
The carvings may be associated with activity on the early Hawkesbury or Windsor Roads. This is an area of very early settlement and this block of land was alienated before 1811. Very few early European carvings are known in New South Wales. Comparable examples are found at the Quarantine Station, North Head and Hartley Gaol. The fact that these carvings are not related to an institutional setting is unusual.

== Description ==
Two figures, possibly Europeans, etched into rock, by sparrow picking. A Salvation Army retirement village, "The Willows" has been built upon the site.

The group of carvings depicts one head and bust in profile, one complete figure, two unfinished heads and the letters AD in an outcrop of hard sandstone. On nearby outcrops two surveyor's benchmarks were observed. The heads are in profile with frontal eyes, wearing tall crowned, wide brimmed hats and smoking long clay pipes. The distinctive hats are suggestive of the style worn by "currency Lads"in the first half of the nineteenth century.

The carvings have significant research potential as they show an assemblage of figures in period dress, and in different stages of completion using two carving methods:

1. the use of broad tipped chisel, and
2. The making of an outline with drill holes which are then joined up with a pointed tool (a technique used in Aboriginal carving).

Surrounding the rock outcrop on which the carvings occur are remnants of the rainforest vegetation which must have originally covered the site.

A retirement village "the Willows" has been built upon the site. The carvings were reported as clear and in good condition at present as at 14 June 2000.

== Heritage listing ==
The carvings are of regional significance as the only known examples of early European carvings in the Parramatta region, the earliest rural settlement in Australia.

These carvings serve as the only surviving visual reminder of the 19th century history of this land associated with pioneering agricultural and early road building work.

European Rock carvings was listed on the New South Wales State Heritage Register on 2 April 1999 having satisfied the following criteria.

The place is important in demonstrating the course, or pattern, of cultural or natural history in New South Wales.

This item is historically significant. The carvings may be associated with activity on the early Hawkesbury or Windsor Roads. This is an area of very early settlement and this block of land was alienated before 1811.

The place possesses uncommon, rare or endangered aspects of the cultural or natural history of New South Wales.

Very few early European carvings are known in New South wales.

The place is important in demonstrating the principal characteristics of a class of cultural or natural places/environments in New South Wales.

This item is representative.
