= Volvo B10 =

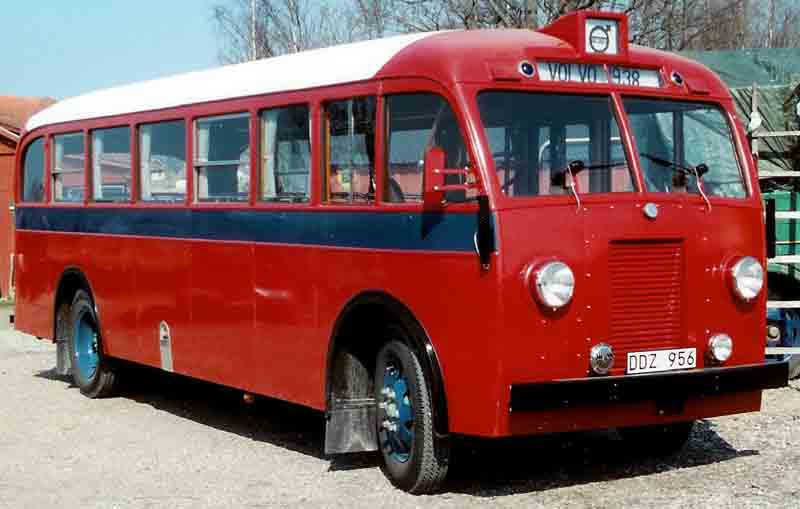
- A preserved 1938 Volvo B10.

Overview
- Manufacturer: Volvo
- Production: 1930s
- Assembly: Sweden

Body and chassis
- Class: Bus chassis

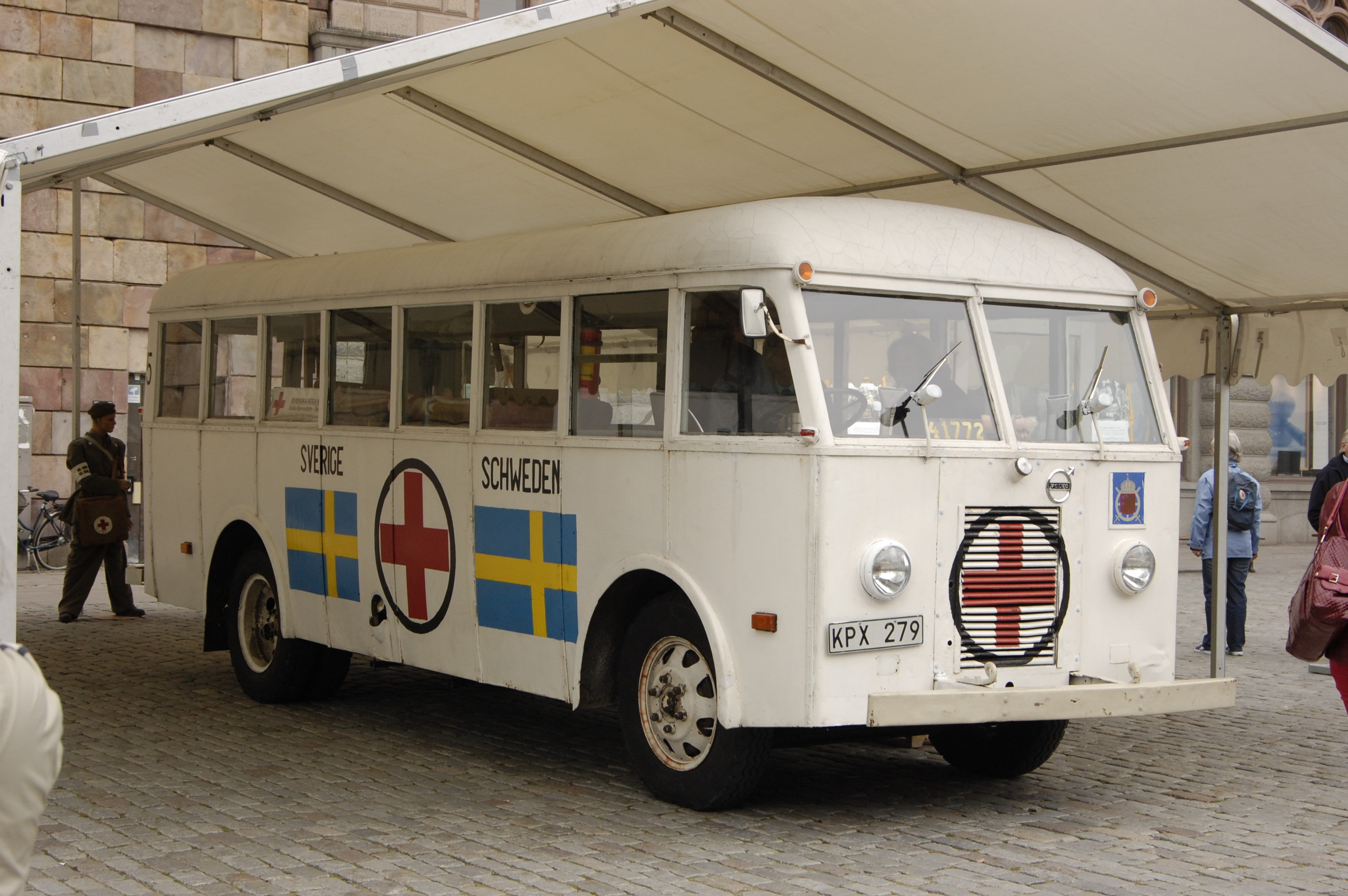
A preserved B10 that was used in the "White Buses" operation.

The Volvo B10 is a retired front-engined bus chassis built by Volvo in the 1930s.

Some of the buses used for the 1945 "White Buses" operation were built on the B10 chassis.
