= Northmead =

Suburb of western Sydney, Australia

- Suburb
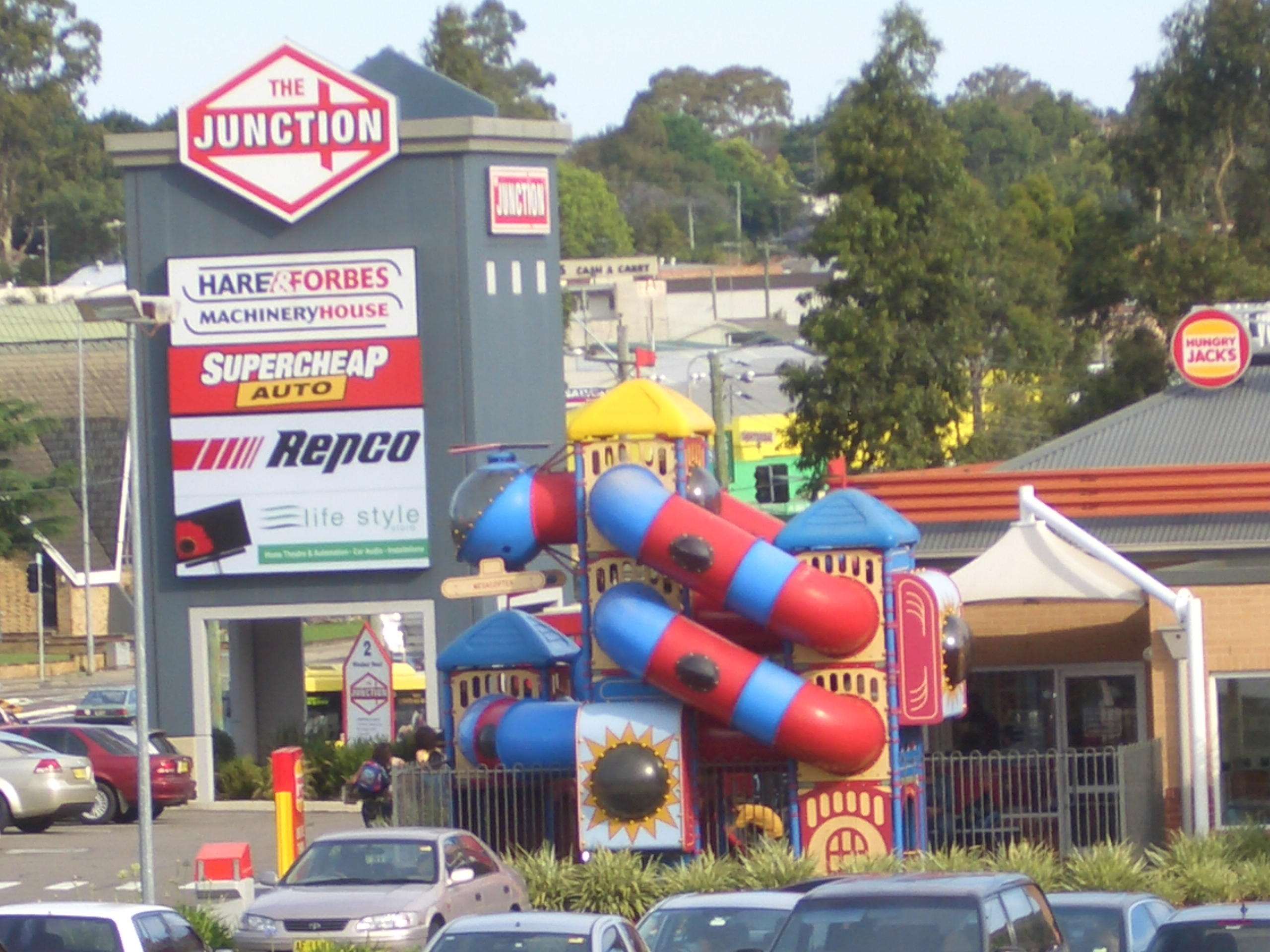
- The Junction,Windsor Road c. 2007

- Interactive map of Northmead
- Country: Australia
- State: New South Wales
- City: Greater Western Sydney
- LGA: City of Parramatta
- Location: 26 km (16 mi) west of Sydney CBD

Government
  - State electorates: Winston Hills; Epping
  - Federal divisions: Mitchell; Parramatta

Area
  - Total: 4.3 km^{2} (1.7 sq mi)
- Elevation: 30 m (98 ft)

Population
  - Total: 11,261 (2021 census)
  - Density: 2,619/km^{2} (6,780/sq mi)
- Postcode: 2152
Suburbs around Northmead
Winston Hills	Baulkam Hills	North Rocks
Old Toongabbie	Northmead	North Parramatta
Wentworthville	Westmead	Parramatta

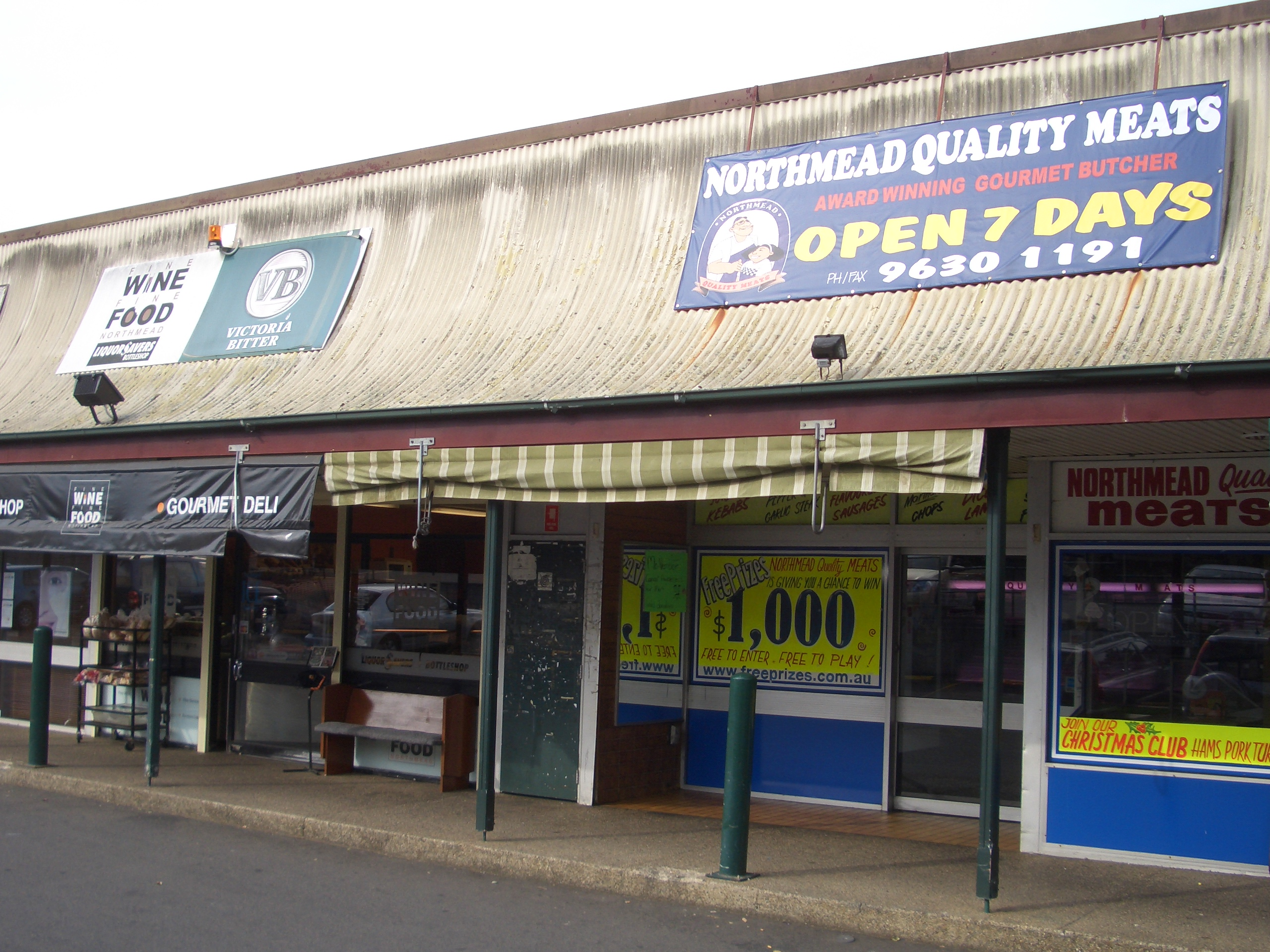
Northmead shopping centre c. 2007

Northmead is a suburb of Greater Western Sydney, in the state of New South Wales, Australia. Northmead is located 26 kilometres west of the Sydney central business district, in the local government area of the City of Parramatta.

Northmead is a hilly suburb with low to medium density houses, townhouses and apartment buildings, and a large light industrial area. It is located to the northeast of the junction of Darling Mills Creek and Toongabbie Creek, which combine to form the beginnings of the Parramatta River.

== History ==
Traditional owners of the land are believed to be the Dharug peoples.

With the British colonization of Parramatta, this area was originally part of the domain of Government House. What is left of this domain, including Government House, forms Parramatta Park.

The name Northmead is derived from the location of the north "mead", or meadow, of the governor's domain. It was an area of orchards and poultary farms prior to being subdivided. The suburb is bordered by the waterways of the Darling Mills and Toongabbie Creeks.

The land was subdivided between 1859 and 1889 and the Northern Meadow and Western Meadow of the domain were split off and called Northmead and Westmead. From this time, orchards were established by many new settlers, including some whose names were well known in the Parramatta area - George Oakes, Nat Payten and William Fullagar among them.

== Heritage listings ==
Northmead has a number of heritage-listed sites, including:

- 64 Windsor Road: 1850 sandstone house, originally used as the manager's residence of a grain mill.
- 226 (rear) Windsor Road: Northmead European rock carvings

== Industrial area ==
The southern portion of Northmead, between Old Windsor Road and Toongabbie Creek is the home of a large number of light industries. Coca-Cola Amatil and a NSW Health Ambulance Superstation are located on Briens Road, with a CDC NSW depot on nearby Boundary Road.

== Commercial areas ==
- Northmead Shopping Centre is located at 2 Campbell Street, corner of Windsor Road, and features a supermarket and many specialty shops. The centre is managed by PRD Nationwide in Bondi Junction.
- The Junction shops are located on the corner of Windsor Road and Briens Road and features a number of retailers for home furnishings, hardware, car accessories, office supplies and electricals and food outlets.
- Corner of Kleins Street and Briens Road features a bottle market, a bakery, a dental practice and a mini convenience shop.

== Schools ==
- Northmead Public School - Moxhams Road.
- Northmead High School - Campbell Street.
- The Hills School - William Street.

== Transport ==
The North-West T-way connecting the Hills with Parramatta runs through Northmead. Northmead's public transport needs are only catered by buses, namely those of the CDC NSW. This results in highly operational bus services in the Hills District - an area that is one of the fastest growing in Australia.

The major roads are Windsor Road and the Cumberland Highway.

== Transport history ==
Northmead once featured a train line known as the Rogans Hill railway line. Long underperforming due to an increasing preference for faster and more modern motor buses, it was decided in 1929 under conservative (United Australia Party) Premier Bertram Stevens that the line should be decommissioned, which eventually took place on 31 January 1932.

Currently, there is no train line that services Northmead with the closest being the Main Western railway line that runs through Westmead and Parramatta.

== Population ==
According to the 2021 census conducted by the Australian Bureau of Statistics, Northmead had a population of 11,261. This was a significant increase from the 2006 census, which showed a population of 6,969. This increase went hand in hand with an increase in apartments in the suburb from 9.9% to 31.5% over the period.

61.5% of people were born in Australia. The most common countries of birth were India 5.2%, China 3.1%, Iran 2.2%, South Korea 1.8% and Philippines 1.8%. 62.8% of people only spoke English at home. Other languages spoken at home included Mandarin 3.6%, Arabic 3.0%, Korean 2.5%, Persian (excluding Dari) 2.4% and Cantonese 2.3%. The religious affiliation responses were Catholic (26.9%), No Religion 25.8% and Anglican (10.4%).

== Notable residents ==
- Richie Benaud (1930–2015), cricketer and commentator.
- Allan Cunningham (1791–1839), explorer and botanist.
- Harry Hopman (1906–1985), tennis player.
- Joshua Katz (born 1997), Olympic judoka.
- David Lennox (1788–1873), colonial bridge builder.
- John Lewin (1770–1819), first professional artist in New South Wales.
- Rev. Samuel Marsden (1765–1838), known as the "flogging parson".
- Dowell Philip O'Reilly (1865–1923), poet and politician.
- Greg Page (born 1972), musician and Wiggles member.
