= Andrew Thompson =

Andrew or Andy Thompson may refer to:

== Sportspeople ==
- Andrew Thompson (catcher) (1846–?), Major League Baseball player for the 1875 Washington Nationals
- Andrew Thompson (footballer) (born 1972), Australian rules footballer
- Andrew Thompson (baseball manager) (1845–1895), Major League Baseball manager for the 1884 St. Paul Saints
- Andrew Thompson (racing driver) (born 1987), Australian racing driver
- Andrew Thompson (rugby union) (born 1974), Irish rugby union player
- Andy Thompson (baseball) (born 1975), former Major League Baseball left fielder
- Andy Thompson (footballer, born in Sunderland) (fl. 1904–05), English football winger for Sunderland
- Andy Thompson (footballer, born 1899) (1899–1970), English footballer
- Andy Thompson (footballer, born 1967), English footballer
- Andy Thompson (American football) (born 1980), American football player and coach
- Andrew Thompson (British racing driver) (active 2003–2004); see Hitech Racing

== Others ==
- Andrew Thompson (convict, magistrate) (c. 1773–1810), Australian convict and settler
- Andrew Thompson (historian) (born 1968), British historian specialising in modern empire
- Andrew Thompson (parasitologist), Australian parasitologist
- Andrew Thompson (politician) (1884–1961), Australian politician
- Andrew Green Thompson (1820–1889), British politician
- Andrew Thorburn Thompson (1870–1939), military officer, editor, lawyer and a third-generation political figure in Canada
- Andrew Thompson (priest) (born 1968, English Anglican priest
- Andy Thompson (Canadian politician) (1924–2016), Canadian politician
- Andy Thompson (Ohio politician) (1963–2020), American politician
- Andy Thompson (theatre professional) (born 1970), Canadian entertainer

== See also ==
- Andrew Thomson (disambiguation)
- Andy Thomson (disambiguation)
