= Andrew Thomson =

Andrew Thomson may refer to:

- Andrew Thomson (academic) (1936–2014), British management education academic and historian
- Andrew Thomson (kickboxer) (born 1974), South African kickboxer
- Andrew Thomson (Canadian politician) (born 1967), Canadian NDP politician and minister, 1995–2007
- Andrew Thomson (Australian politician) (born 1961), Australian Liberal politician and minister, 1995–2001
- Andrew Thomson (author), New Zealand UN doctor and author
- Rev Andrew Thomson (minister) (1814–1901), Scottish biographer
- Andrew Thomson (Australian footballer) (born 1972), Australian rules footballer for Sydney Swans
- Andrew Thomson (Scottish footballer) (1865–1936), Scottish international footballer
- Andrew Mitchell Thomson (1779–1831), minister of the Church of Scotland
- Andrew Thomson (sea captain) (1887–1975), sea captain

== See also ==
- Andy Thomson (disambiguation)
- Andrew Thompson (disambiguation)
