= Andy Thomson =

Andy Thomson may refer to:

- Andy Thomson (sea captain) (1887-1975), Cook Islands trading schooner master
- Andy Thomson (Scottish footballer) (born 1971), former Scottish football player for Queen of the South, Southend United, Oxford United, Gillingham, QPR, Partick Thistle, Falkirk and Stenhousemuir
- Andy Thomson (English footballer) (born 1974), former English football player for Swindon, Portsmouth, Bristol Rovers and Wycombe Wanderers
- J. Anderson Thomson, psychiatrist noted for work in evolutionary psychology
- Andy Thomson (bowls) (born 1955), lawn and indoor bowler
- Andy R. Thomson, Canadian architect and environmentalist

== See also ==
- Andrew Thomson (disambiguation)
- Andrew Thompson (disambiguation)
