= Model Farms =

Area in a suburb of Sydney, Australia

Coordinates: 33°46′39″S 150°58′40″E

Model Farms is a locality of Winston Hills, a suburb of Sydney, in the state of New South Wales, Australia. It is located in the local government area of the City of Parramatta.

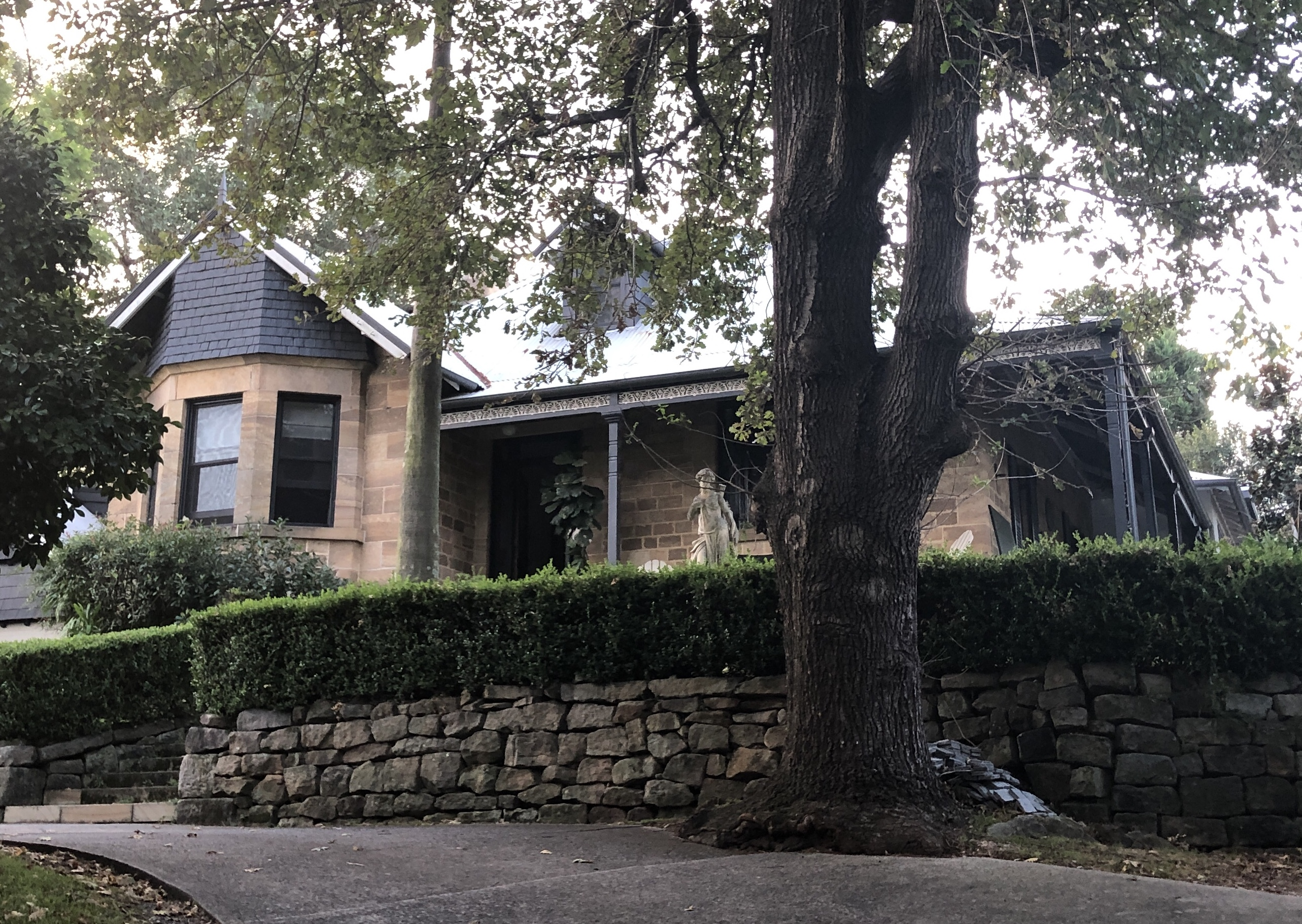
St Kilda, Model Farms, Winston Hills

== History ==
Originally, Model Farm was part of governor Phillip's and Governor Macquarie's demesne or domain. It extended from the 200 acres (now Parramatta Park) to Junction Road, Winston Hills, with Fitzwilliam Road and Windsor Road forming the side boundaries.

On 18 March 1857 (20 Vic, Act 35) an Act to provide for the disposal of the Domain was passed. It shall be lawful for the governor with the advice of the Executive Council to sell or other wise dispose of land known as the Parramatta domain in all respects as ordinary Waste Lands of the Crown provided that a portion thereof not being less than two hundred acres in extent shall be reserved from sale and shall be set apart and granted as a Park for promoting the health and recreation of the inhabitants of the Town of Parramatta." The areas became known as Northmead (or meadow) and Westmead (or meadow). The name 'Model Farms' was a small area set aside in what is now Winston Hills that was to provide land for almost self subsistence as opposed to the large landholders many of whom were only speculators and later subdivided the land into smaller blocks. Some built the "Country Houses" on the plots of land. The area was covered with orchards, duck farms and dairies. The Tram service of 1901-1923 from Parramatta along Windsor Road and then the train (1923-1932) service that left from Westmead station stopped off at Model Farm Siding to pick up the produce to take it to market in Parramatta and beyond. Trucks began to take over the road and became more popular for the produce transport as there was less handling.

== Schools ==
- Model Farms High School, located in Baulkham Hills but isn't far from Model Farms and therefore shares its name with the locality
