= Winston Hills =

- Suburb
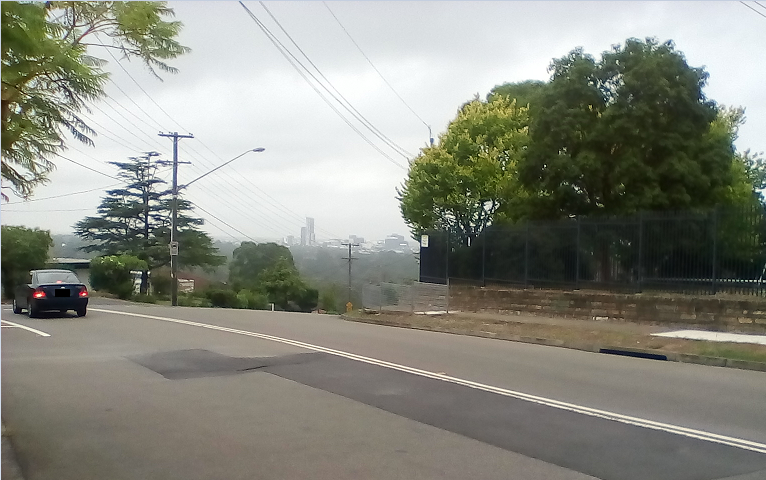
- Street scene in front of St Pauls at Oakes Road with Parramatta Skyline in distance.

- Interactive map of Winston Hills
- Country: Australia
- State: New South Wales
- City: Sydney
- LGAs: City of Parramatta; The Hills Shire
- Location: 28 km (17 mi) west of Sydney CBD

Government
  - State electorate: Winston Hills
  - Federal division: Mitchell
- Elevation: 70 m (230 ft)

Population
  - Total: 12,123 (2021 census)
- Postcode: 2153
Suburbs around Winston Hills
Seven Hills	Baulkham Hills	Baulkham Hills
Seven Hills	Winston Hills	Northmead
Toongabbie	Old Toongabbie	Constitution Hill

Winston Hills is a suburb of Sydney, in the state of New South Wales, Australia. Winston Hills is located 28 kilometres west of the Sydney central business district in the local government areas of the City of Parramatta and The Hills Shire. Winston Hills is part of the Hills District region of Greater Western Sydney.

== History ==
Winston Hills was originally part of the “Toongabbie” area. The traditional inhabitants of the land are thought to be originally the Dharug peoples, specifically the Toongagal clan.

As the colony spread out, the Toongabbie area grew and was later divided up into separate suburbs.

Winston Hills was named after Britain's Prime Minister Winston Churchill (1874–1965) during World War II. With the name being preferred to Churchill Hills. In the early days, this area was named Model Farms (a name retained in a locality of the suburb and local high school) as this was the area where a model farm was developed to show settlers the types of crops that could be grown in different seasons.

Development of the suburb began in the 1960s by Hooker Rex, and there is little undeveloped land left. In 2009, the last remaining large parcel of vacant land, at Buckleys Hill, started to be developed. There is not much natural bushland left in the suburb, except for the creek corridors, like Toongabbie Creek. It was transferred from the local government area of the City of Blacktown to the City of Parramatta in 1972.

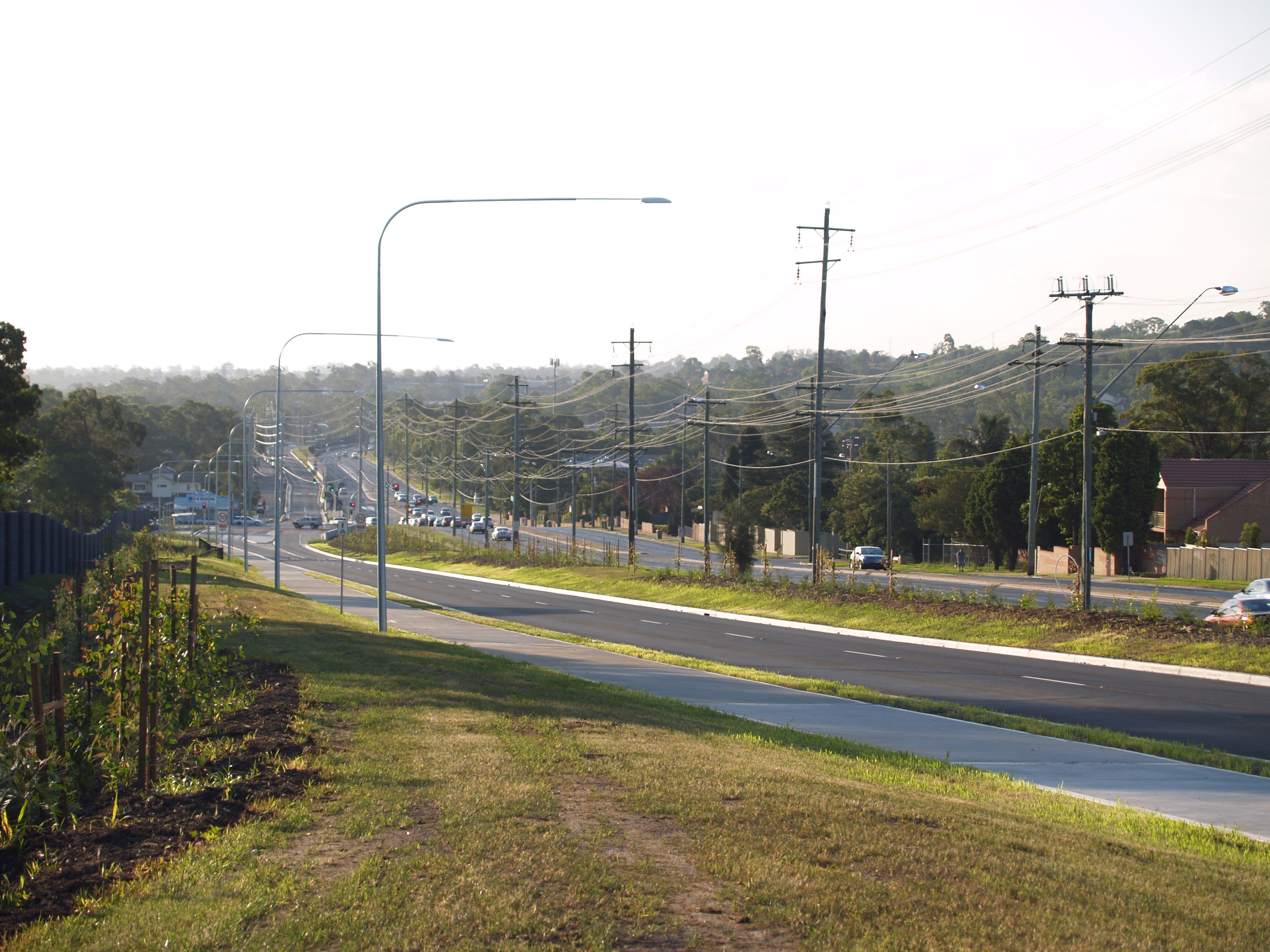
Winston Hills from Old Windsor Road.

Some streets are named after writers such as Bronte Place, Shelley Street, Twain Street, Voltaire Road and Homer Street which also links to other street names from Greek mythology such as Troy Place, Hera Place, Nestor Street, Ixion Street, Eros Place, Remus Place, Romulus Street, Latona Street, Olympus Street and Atlas Place. Other group of streets are named after great scientists Einstein, Volta, Lister, Edison and Marconi or Biblical figures such as Goliath, Gideon and Esther. Other streets are named after Britain's prime ministers, like Attlee Place, Melbourne Road, Disraeli Road, Lloyd George Avenue, and Palmerston Avenue.

== Heritage listings ==
Winston Hills has a number of heritage-listed sites, including:

- Goliath Avenue: Toongabbie Government Farm Archaeological Site
- 76 Lanhams Road: Late Victorian house built in the 1880s
- 41 Buckleys Road: Buckley House, built circa 1891

== Population ==
In the 2021 Census, there were 12,123 people in Winston Hills. 68.7% of people were born in Australia. The most common countries of birth were China 3.6%, India 3.6%, England 2.7%, Lebanon 1.4%, and South Korea 1.3%. 69.8% of people only spoke English at home. Other languages spoken at home included Mandarin 4.0%, Arabic 3.9%, Cantonese 2.6%, Korean 1.8%, and Hindi 1.6%. The most common responses for religion were Catholic 33.9%, No Religion 25.5% and Anglican 12.7%.

== Commercial area ==
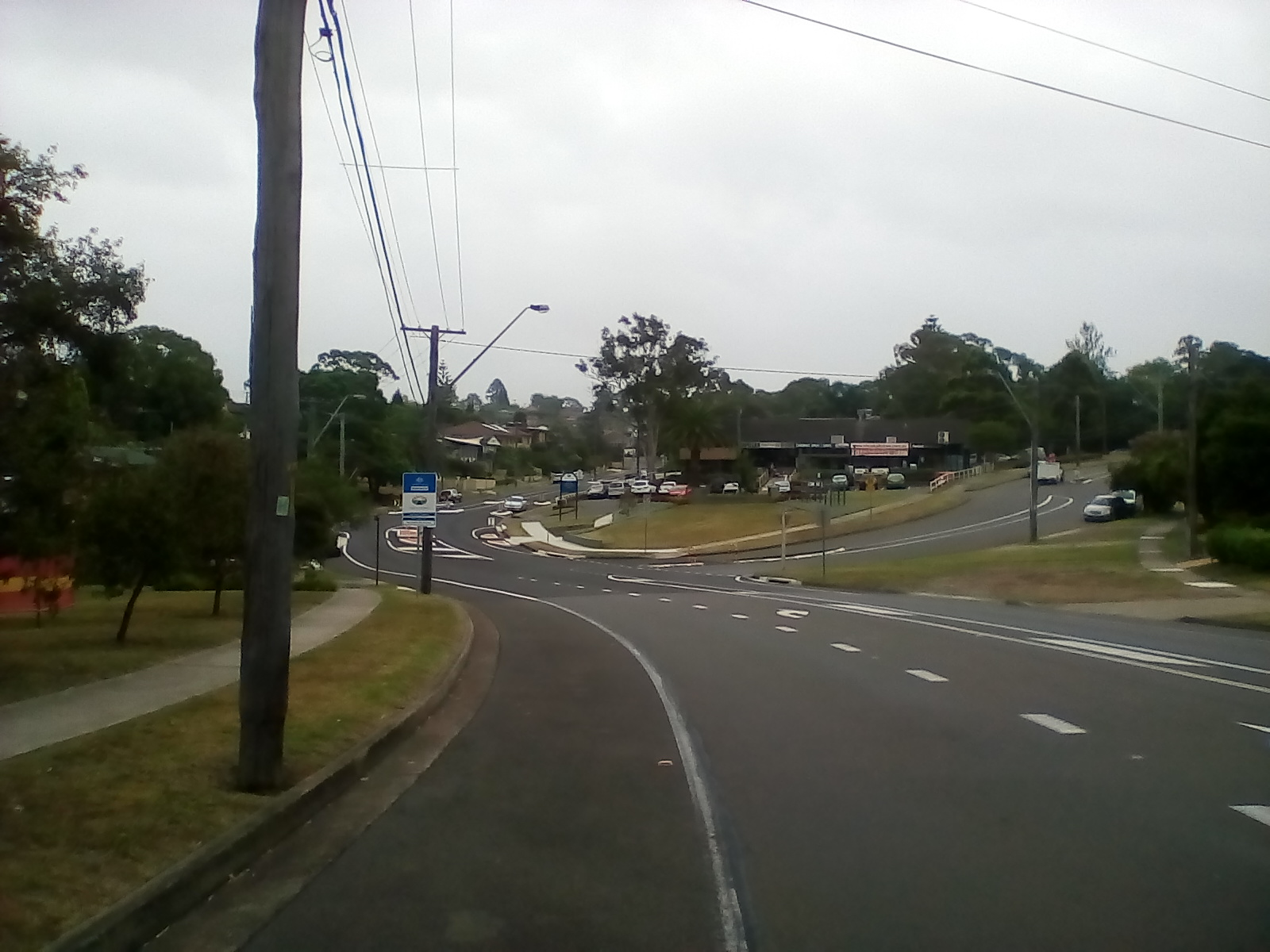
Winston Hills, New South Wales

Winston Hills Mall is a shopping centre that features a discount department store, supermarkets, over 75 specialty shops and a food court. Further east along Caroline Chisholm Drive is a small shopping centre known as the Chisholm Centre. On the southern side of the hill is a small shopping centre called the Lomond Centre and approximately 500 metres west of it is another row of shops, named Rebecca Parade shops.

== Schools ==
- Winston Hills Public School (Note: Built-in 1970, Winston Hills Public School was originally considered to be called "Model Farms Public School" due to the original name of the area which had been changed only a few years earlier to "Winston Hills".)
- Winston Heights Public School
- St Paul the Apostle

== Sport and recreation ==
Winston Hills has Girl Guides, Scouts, rugby league, baseball, football and netballclubs. The football club (The Bears) is one of the largest in suburban Sydney. They also have a well known Rugby League club known as Winston Hills Tigers. In 1983, Winston Hills Warriors Baseball Club was established after breaking away from Baulkham Hills. WHBC started playing at Col Sutton Park, just down the road from Model Farms High School. Winston Hills is one of the best clubs in senior A grade baseball in Sydney.

In 2010, the Winston Hills Girl Guides joined worldwide celebrations for the centenary (100th birthday) of the Guiding movement during the nationally acclaimed 'Year of the Girl Guide'. The Winston Hills Scouts also mark the 40th anniversary for their district.

== Notable residents ==
- Joseph Cook, 6th Prime Minister of Australia lived at the homestead "Corovo", which was located at 222 Windsor Road
- George Oakes, pastoralist and politician owned the homestead "Casuarina", which was located on Oakes Road, named after him
