= Emergency Sex and Other Desperate Measures =

2004 memoir of three UN recruits

Emergency Sex and Other Desperate Measures: A True Story from Hell on Earth
- Title page for Emergency Sex and Other Desperate Measures: A True Story from Hell on Earth (2004)
- Author: Heidi Postlewait; Kenneth Cain; Andrew Thomson
- Language: English
- Genre: Memoir
- Publisher: Hyperion
- Publication date: 2004
- Publication place: United States
- ISBN: 1-4013-5201-4

Emergency Sex and Other Desperate Measures: A True Story from Hell on Earth, by Heidi Postlewait, Kenneth Cain and Andrew Thomson, is a 2004 memoir of three young people who join the United Nations (UN) during the 1990s. It recounts the authors' experiences during the United Nations Transitional Authority in Cambodia and UN peacekeeping operations.

The book is critical of some aspects of the United Nations and its operations. Figures within the UN, including Shashi Tharoor and Kofi Annan, criticised the authors for releasing the book. It was adapted into a 2007 stage play.

== Summary ==
Thomson is a New Zealand-born physician who is inspired to work in Cambodia after meeting a mature age Cambodian medical student in his Auckland University class. Postlewait is a New York social worker who is struggling to make ends meet after the end of her marriage. Cain is an idealistic Harvard graduate who does not want to go into corporate law.

The three stories intersect through the years from Cambodia, to Somalia, Haiti, Rwanda, Bosnia and Liberia. This is the first account from UN workers on the front line and a memoir about the successes and failures of the UN.

Brutal and moving in equal measure, Emergency Sex (And Other Desperate Measures) explores pressing global issues while never losing a sense of the personal. Deeply critical of the West's indifference to developing countries and the UN's repeated failure to intervene decisively, the book provoked massive controversy on its initial publication. Kofi Annan called for the book to be banned, and debate was sparked about the future direction of the UN. Brilliantly written and mordantly funny, it is a book that continues to make waves.

— Publisher's summary

== Reception ==
Other critiques were not as impressed by the book. The Guardian claimed that one should not become an aid worker if "Your favourite book about aid is Emergency Sex."

The New Yorker questioned the behavior of the authors, and in its review quoted figures who had been criticized in the book, including Shashi Tharoor, the Under-Secretary-General for Communications and Public Information and an overseer of the peacekeeping mission in the former Yugoslavia. Tharoor stated that “[i]t didn’t seem right for people to work for the organization and trash it the way these people did.” Doing so while collecting a paycheck, he said, was “slightly contemptible. The review further noted that "“Emergency Sex,” with its tales of drug use and disillusionment and its emphasis on personal drama, is not a typical whistle-blowing tract; however, the authors do make a number of serious allegations of corruption, negligence, and inadequate leadership, particularly with regard to the genocides in Rwanda and Srebrenica. It also suggested that some of the authors' comments could be described as reckless, and that Andrew Thomson would like his job back; Thomson, who had been stationed in Geneva "for the remainder of his term" at the time of the book's publishing, was fired for his contributions.

Thomson said, “I think Shashi Tharoor has put himself and the organization on a really slippery slope, and at the ugly bottom of that you run into historical revisionism and Holocaust deniers", but stated that he still wished "to go on serving as a doctor to the staff,” Later, with the help of the Government Accountability Project, a whistleblower's association, Thomson was reinstated and promoted.

== Adaptations ==
Emergency Sex and Other Desperate Measures was adapted for the stage by Australian playwright, Damien Millar. It won Griffin Theatre Company’s annual Griffin Award for an outstanding new play in 2007.

The book has been optioned for television. Randall Wallace, script writer for Braveheart, is working on the screen play.
