= Andrew Thompson (convict, magistrate) =

Australian settler

- Born: Town Yetholm, Scotland, United Kingdom
- Baptised: 7 February 1773
- Died: 22 October 1810 (aged 36–37); Green Hills Windsor, New South Wales, Australia
- Other name: Andrew Thomson
- Occupations: Chief constable, farmer, ship owner, businessman, magistrate
- Years active: 1792−1810
- Known for: Supporting Bligh, flood rescue hero, district leader, government official
- Criminal charge: larceny
- Criminal penalty: 14 years

Andrew Thompson (c. 1773 – 22 October 1810) was transported at the age of 18 to New South Wales, arriving in Sydney on 14 February 1792. He rose to become a respected chief constable in the Hawkesbury district, a successful farmer and businessman, and eventually the wealthiest settler in early colonial Australia. In 1810 he was the first ex-convict to be appointed as magistrate.

== Early life and conviction in Scotland ==
Thompson was born into a rural weaving family in the Scottish border town of Yetholm and baptised the parish church of Kirk Yetholm on 7 February 1773. He was well educated at the local parish school. On 25 August 1790 Andrew was charged, along with an itinerant weaver John Aitkin, of stealing from his brother William and a local merchant. Aitkin escaped to England and was outlawed but Thompson was convicted at an assizes trial in Jedburgh on 22 September 1790 to 14 years transportation. He was taken from the Jedburgh Tolbooth jail to Portsmouth and was loaded onto the convict transport Pitt, which set sail for New South Wales on 17 July 1791.

== Convict in New South Wales ==
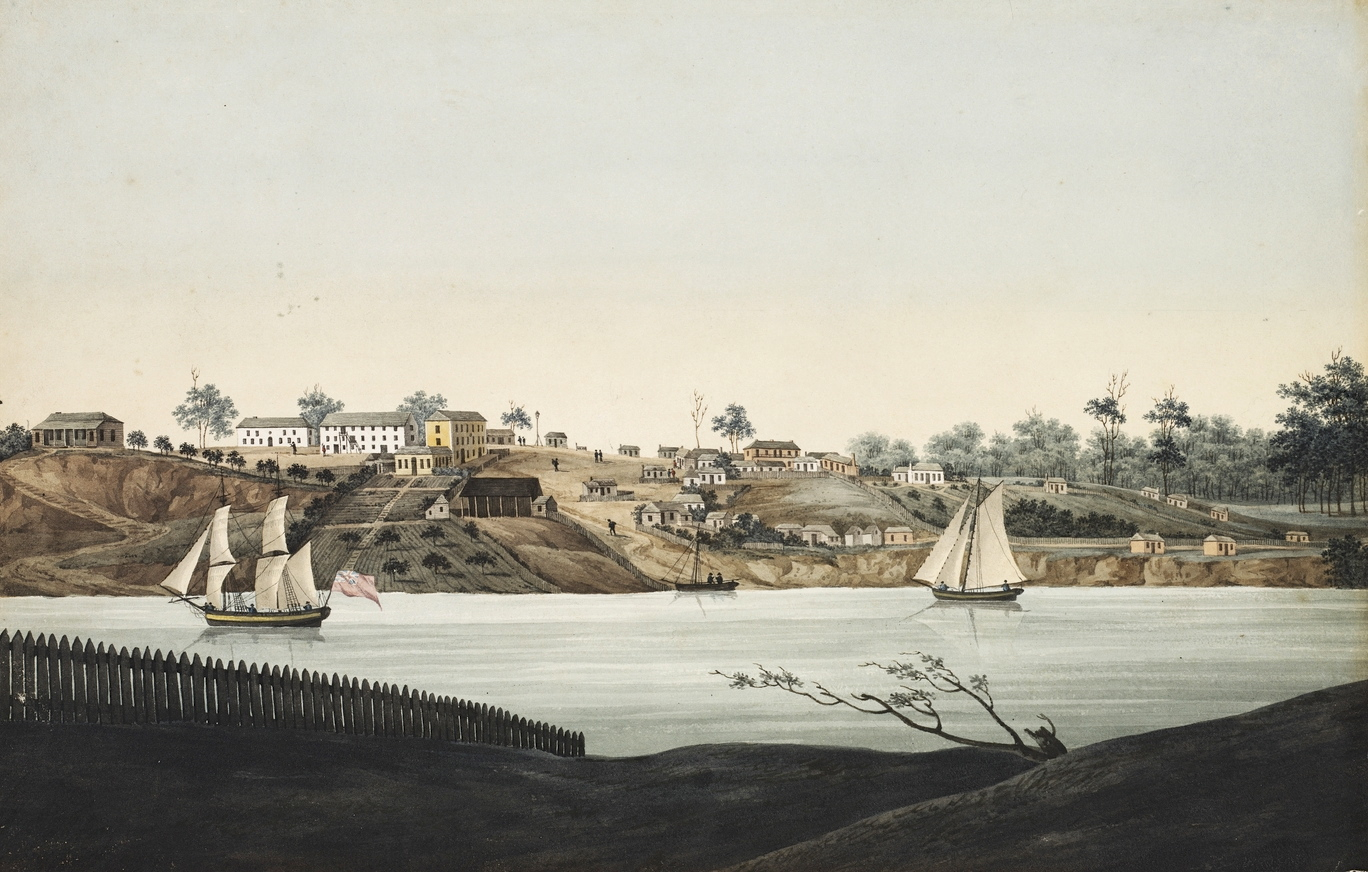
1809 painting of Green Hills on the Hawkesbury River showing Thompson's buildings and ships

After a very eventful voyage, Andrew Thompson arrived in Port Jackson New South Wales on 14 February 1792 with 367 other convicts. He was promptly sent to Parramatta to labour as a stonemason. In 1793 he was made a convict constable at the Toongabbie government farm, where he served for 3 years. In July 1796 Andrew, aged 23, successfully applied to become a constable at the Green Hills settlement located on the Hawkesbury River. He would remain a resident in this area for most of his life. Over the next five years he proved to be a skilled, industrious and honest law-enforcement officer, and on 17 October 1797 he was granted an absolute pardon by Governor Hunter in recognition of his meritorious service.

== Farmer, businessman and ship owner ==
Maintaining his constable post, Thompson was particularly prominent in the rescue of settlers in the massive Hawkesbury floods during 1799-1801 period and was considered in the district to be something of a hero. Following the March 1799 floods he bought farmland close to Green Hills and became a wheat farmer as well as a police constable. He would continue to acquire and farm numerous properties over the next ten years. On 13 November 1800 Governor King appointed him Registrar of Agreements at the Hawkesbury, and in July 1801 he was promoted to Chief constable. In May 1802 Thompson constructed over the South Creek, the first toll bridge in the colony. It linked Green Hills with the Old Parramatta Road and removed the need for a ferry. By now he had become one of the largest grower of cereal crops in the colony, and over the two years from mid 1802 to mid 1804 he constructed and launched three ships (the Hope, the Nancy and the Hawkesbury) for transporting produce to and from Sydney. On 11 May 1806 Governor King granted Thompson a license to build a brewery at Green Hills.

== A Bligh loyalist and bailiff ==
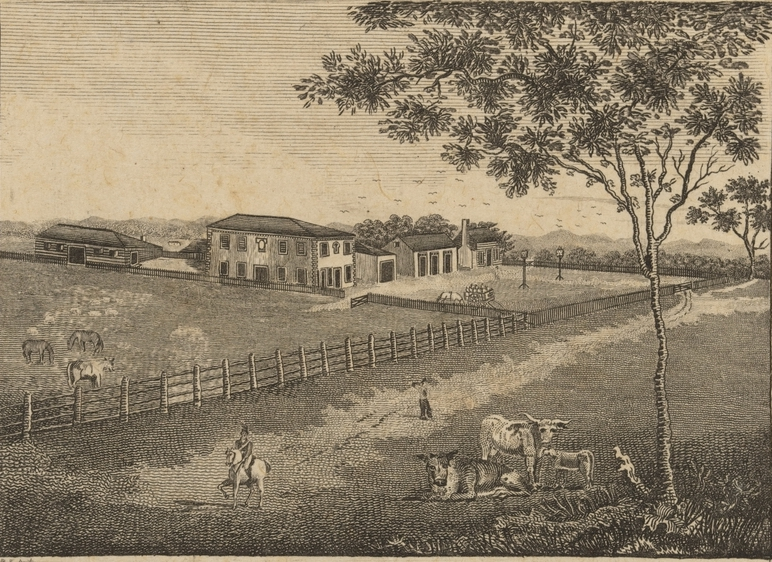
1810 etching of Thompson's Red House Farm, Windsor

On 6 August 1806 William Bligh became the 4th NSW governor and Thompson agreed to be the bailiff and manager of his Blighton model farm. He also acted as a spokesman of the Hawkesbury settlers, coordinating the presentation of the loyalty address to Bligh that swore the allegiance of small farmers in the district to the governor. On 21 March 1807 Thompson launched another ship, the Governor Bligh. Following the overthrow of Governor Bligh on 26 January 1808 by John Macarthur and the NSW Corps officers, Thompson was interrogated by the rebels seeking evidence of governmental corruption and collusion. No justification for the rebellion was found.

== Under the rebel administration ==
On 2 February 1808 Thompson was dismissed as chief constable, and on 26 February 1808 John Macarthur took out a £10,000 capias (legal restraint bond) on Thompson to try and prevent him leaving the colony and becoming a witness for Bligh's defense. On 31 December 1808 Lt. Governor Joseph Foveaux converted a lease on 5000 square metres of prime land in Sydney, on which Thompson had built a grand house close to the harbour, into a land grant. In May and July 1809 there were further major floods on the Hawkesbury River and tributaries, and Thompson again played a major role in the rescue of hundreds of settlers.

== A friend of Macquarie ==
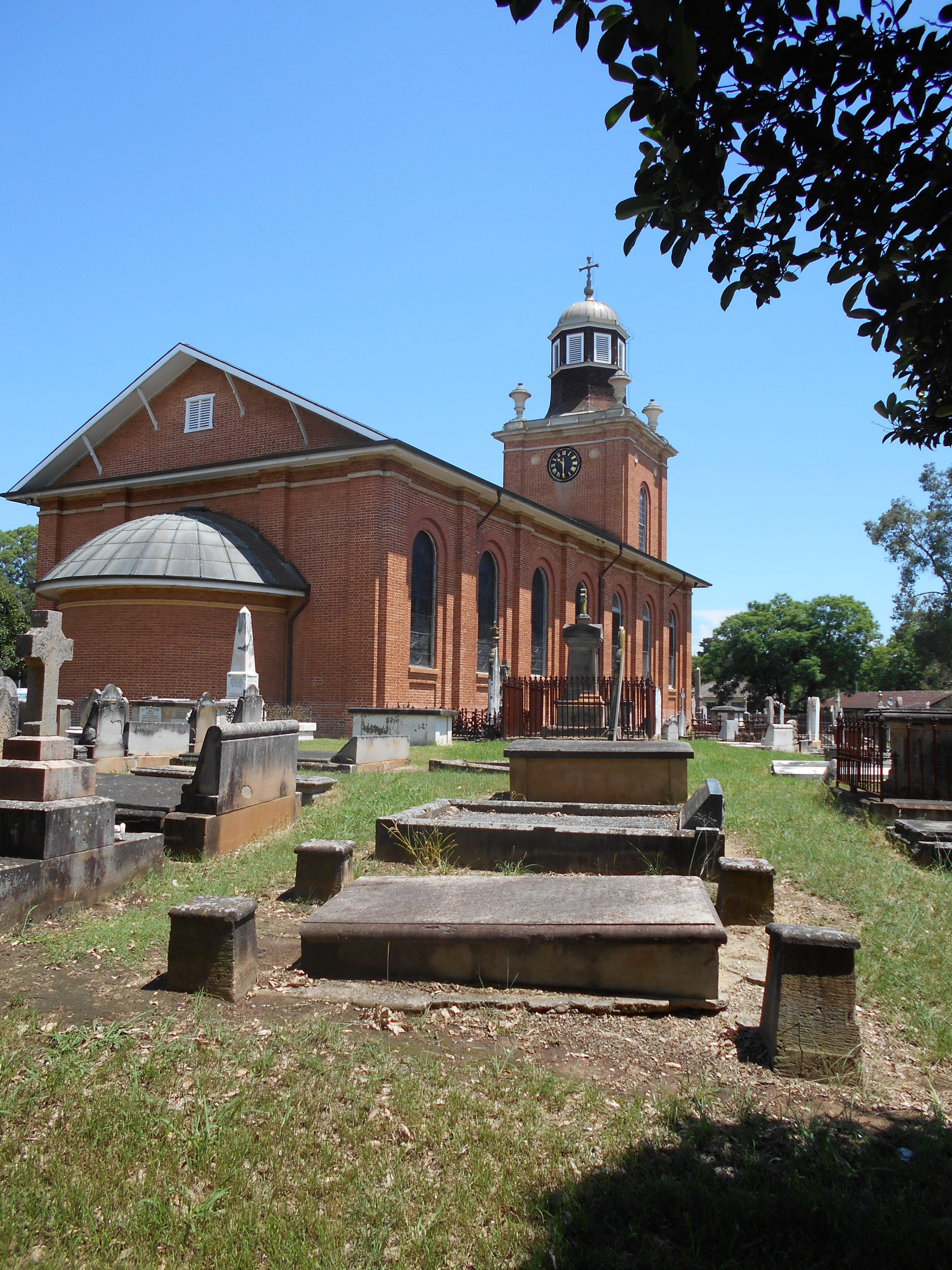
Andrew Thompson's grave (foreground) in the cemetery of St Matthew's church, Windsor

On 1 January 1810 Lachlan Macquarie became the 5th NSW governor and on 14 January 1810 he appointed Andrew Thompson to be a justice of the peace and magistrate for the Hawkesbury district; the first ex-convict to assume that post. Andrew became a personal friend of Lachlan and Elizabeth Macquarie, and was regularly invited to Government House to dine with them. But Thompson's health had been badly affected by the flood rescues, and on 22 October 1810 he died in Green Hills (Windsor) of respiratory failure, and was buried with great ceremony in the St Matthew's Church cemetery. On 11 January 1811 the Governor declared that the town square at the centre of Windsor would be named Thompson Square to commemorate his enormous contributions to the town and the district. In July 1813 Lachlan and Elizabeth Macquarie placed a tombstone on Andrew Thompson's grave site with a personal inscription.

== Andrew Thompson's legacy ==
Thompson had a vast estate, and his will bequeathed one half of this to his family in Britain and a quarter each to Governor Macquarie and his friend and business associate Simeon Lord. Settlement of the will by executors Henry Antill and Thomas Moore proved extremely complex because of the large number of properties and businesses, but also due to extensive credits from outstanding debts and loans. The settlement was not finalized until 15 years later, principally because the Thompson beneficiaries in England refused to correspond with the executors. The estimated retrievable value of the estate was £25,000 (over £2 million, today).

== Bibliography ==
- Byrnes, John Valentine, An outcast goat, or, The life and times of Andrew Thompson, Thesis (M.A.) University of Sydney, 1958.
- Hall, Annegret (2021). Andrew Thompson: From Boy Convict to Wealthiest Settler in Colonial Australia. Nedlands: ESH Publication. ISBN 978-0-9876292-2-7.
