= Andrew Thompson (priest) =

English Anglican priest

Andrew Thompson MBE
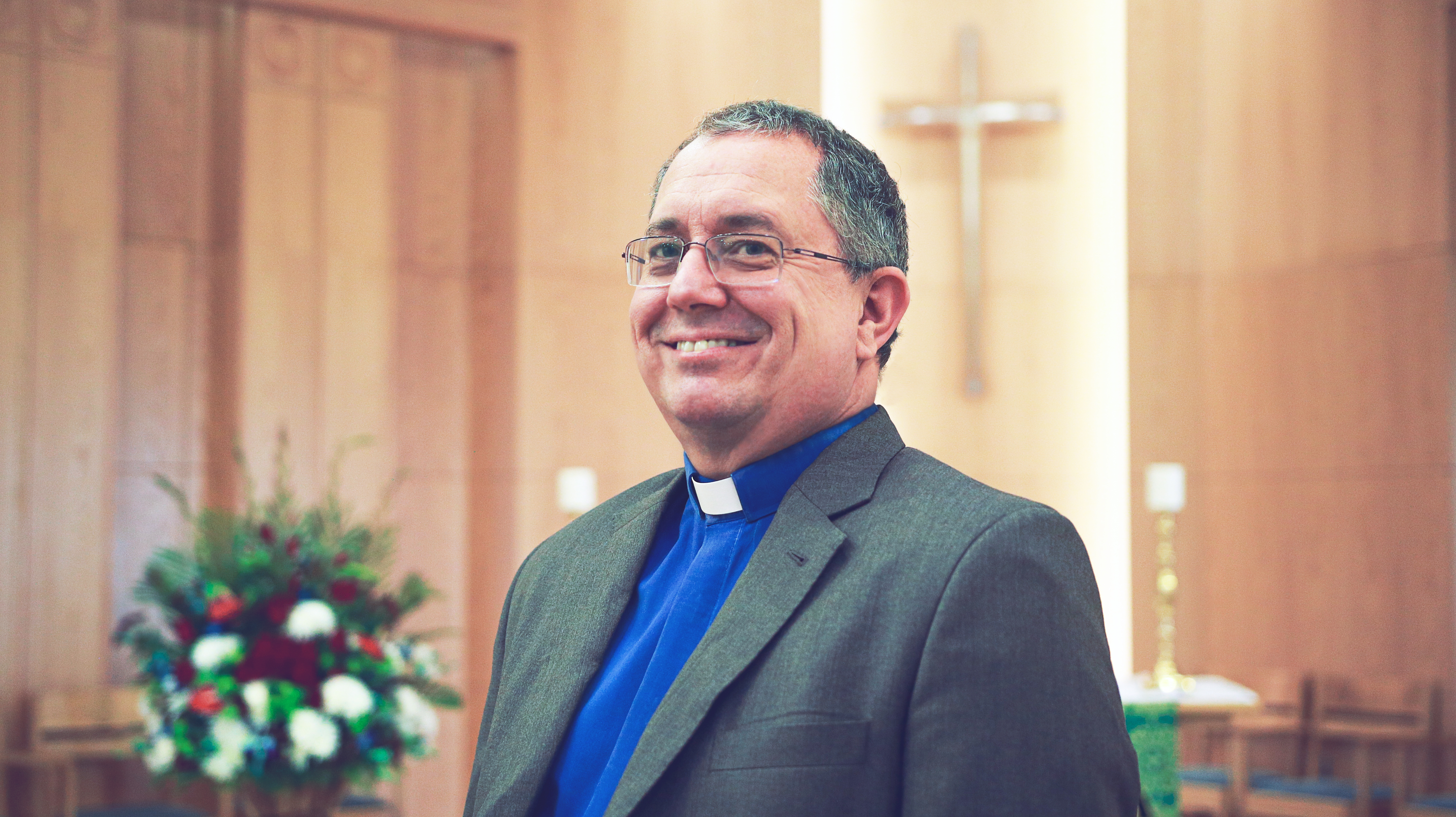
- Reverend Canon Andrew Thompson at St Andrew's Church in Abu Dhabi, UAE

Personal life
- Born: 23 June 1968 (age 58) Crawley, England
- Spouse: Navina
- Children: 3
- Education: Heart of England School; Polytechnic of Wales

Religious life
- Religion: Anglican
- Denomination: Anglican
- Church: St. Margaret's Church in Uxbridge, London Diocese
- Profession: Author, magician and interfaith activist
- Ordination: June 2000

Andrew Thompson (born 23 June 1968) is an English Anglican priest, who has done extensive religious work with churches throughout the Middle East and North Africa region, currently based at St. Margaret's Church in Uxbridge, London Diocese. He is also an author, magician, and interfaith activist.

== Early life and education ==
Thompson was born in Crawley and went to the Heart of England school in Balsall Common; he was born with a hearing impairment, which affected his speech. His parents were both officers in the Church Army, an Anglican organisation which provides evangelists for the Church of England and other places in the Anglican Communion. He studied Behavioural Sciences at the Polytechnic of Wales (now the University of Glamorgan). He has an MA by research on the subject of 'Christian and Muslim relations in Oman' from University of Gloucestershire and awarded a PhD by publication for his research on the subject of 'Christianity in the Arabian Gulf'.

== Ministry ==
After graduating, he spent several years working with churches in the Middle East and North Africa. He then returned to the UK and served as a Youth Worker at Holy Trinity Church, Matlock Bath in the Diocese of Derby. During this time, he developed his skills in magic and used this as a teaching tool for the Christian faith and released his first book; Gospel Magic for Preachers.

He was ordained in Derby Cathedral by Jonathan Bailey in June 2000. He served his curacy at the Oakwood Ecumenical Church from 2000 – 2004, while studying for a Master's Degree from the University of Nottingham, in which he studied the Muslim community of Derby and issues of identity, theology and cultural integration.

He then returned to the Middle East, where he was the chaplain at St Paul's Church, in Kuwait from 2006 – 2010 and was made an Honorary Canon of Bahrain Cathedral. He sparked controversy when a newspaper article recorded a statement, in which he declared that it "was easier to be a Christian in the UAE than in the UK".

This statement was subsequently used by the UAE ambassador to the US in support of the tolerant ethos his country.

In 2010, Thompson became the chaplain at St Andrew's Church, Abu Dhabi, United Arab Emirates, this church is part of the Diocese of Cyprus and the Gulf.

In 2020, he was appointed Team Vicar of St. Margaret's Church in Uxbridge, London Diocese.

== Interfaith work ==
Thompson is chairman of the board for the Al Amana Centre, which is in Muscat, Oman. This is the only Muslim-Christian relations interfaith institute run by the church in the Arabian Peninsula, the centre provides scriptural reasoning and other interfaith encounters between visiting groups of Christian students, pastors, scholars and local Omani Muslims.

He has had the opportunity to promote a better understanding of life for Christians in the Persian Gulf region, in various contexts, including at the House of Lords in London, the G20 Interfaith Summit in Australia, he has spoken at the Doha Trialogues, in Parliament in Denmark, and met Pope Francis in the Vatican as part of a delegation from the United Arab Emirates. He has also attended the National Prayer Breakfast in Washington, D.C. and the Religious Pluralism Conference in Athens, as a representative of the Christian community in the United Arab Emirates.

== Honours ==
Thompson was awarded an MBE in 2011, for his "services to human rights and promoting interfaith dialogue between Christians and Muslims in Kuwait". In 2019, he was awarded the 'Pioneer of the Emirates Medal' from the Prime Minister Sheikh Mohammed bin Rashid al Maktoum.

== Books ==
Christianity in Oman: Ibadism, Religious Freedom, and the Church (Christianities of the World)

Christianity in Oman explores the relationship between the distinctive Islamic beliefs (Ibadism) of Oman and how they define the experience of the church with regards to religious freedom.

Celebrating Tolerance: Religious Diversity in the UAE

Published in 2019 during the UAE's 'Year of Tolerance' Celebrating Tolerance is a collection of representatives of diverse faiths sharing their migration and experiences in the UAE.

Jesus of Arabia

Jesus of Arabia explores the teachings of Jesus through the culture of the Persian Gulf region, the book has received favourable reviews. and has been translated into Arabic, Korean, and soon to be in Chinese.

Christianity in the United Arab Emirates

This book considers the history and significance of the Christian faith in the United Arab Emirates, the author discusses the increasing importance of Muslim-Christian relations in enabling international security, he calls for and gives examples of bridge building activities. The book launch was hosted by the British Ambassador to the UAE, Dominic Jermey and was attended by Prince Andrew, Duke of York and Sheikh Nahyan bin Mubarak Al Nahyan, the Minister of Culture for the UAE.

The Christian Church in Kuwait

Gospel Magic for Preachers: Theology & Praxis

Gospel Magic. How to use Magic Tricks as Visual Aids

== Films ==
Thompson has been the subject of two films:

One.

One. was directed and produced by Daniel Malak, it is a short documentary based on the friendship and hope for religious tolerance between a priest and an imam.

Hartom

Hartom is a documentary written and directed by Arkus Arksus, based on the professional life of Andrew Thompson.

It has been screened at various film festivals and won the best producer award at the 2016 Arab Film studio, as well as best documentary short at the 2017 Whatashort Independent International Film Festival in India.

== Personal life ==
Thompson is married to Navina and they have three children.
