= Andy Thompson (footballer, born in Sunderland) =

English footballer

Personal information
- Full name: Andrew Thompson
- Place of birth: Sunderland, England
- Position: Winger

Senior career*
Years	Team	Apps	(Gls)
1904	Sunderland West End		
1904–1905	Sunderland	2	(0)
1905–1907	Queens Park Rangers	17	(6)
- * Club domestic league appearances and goals

Andrew Thompson was an English professional footballer who played as a winger for Sunderland.
