= Andrew Thomson (author) =

New Zealand writer and physician

Andrew Thomson (born 1963/1964) is a New Zealand born doctor and co-author of the international best selling book Emergency Sex and Other Desperate Measures. He has dedicated his life to humanitarian aid.

Thomson was born in Wellington and grew up in the Solomon Islands and Auckland where he went to school. He attended the University of Auckland Medical School from 1981 to 1987, graduating top of his class. His interest in humanitarian work came about when he was a medical student and got to know a refugee doctor who survived the notorious Cambodian killing fields.

On graduation he worked at Auckland Hospital then with the Red Cross in Cambodia. He joined the UN medical team in 1993 and worked in Cambodia, Haiti, Rwanda and Bosnia. He has also worked with the international criminal tribunals for the former Yugoslavia and for Rwanda, including exhuming mass graves to gather forensic evidence to prosecute government officials.

In 2004 he co-authored the memoir Emergency Sex and Other Desperate Measures: a True Story of Hell on Earth with his UN colleagues Heidi Postlewait and Kenneth Cain. The book, which was critical of the UN, exposed corruption, dysfunction and failures during its peace-keeping missions in Rwanda, Bosnia, Somalia and Haiti. Thomson was sacked for his role in the book but with the help of the Government Accountability Project, a whistleblower's association, he was reinstated and promoted.

In 2006 Thomson received a Distinguished Alumni Award from the University of Auckland.
