= Andrew Thompson (parasitologist) =

Richard Christopher Andrew Thompson is an Australian parasitologist. He is Professor Emeritus of Parasitology at Murdoch University and a member of the Management Committee of the Australian Society for Parasitology.

== Research and roles ==
Thompson earned a B.Sc. and Ph.D. from the University of London. Thompson's research centres on the molecular epidemiology and zoonotic transmission of protozoan parasites, particularly Giardia and Cryptosporidium. He is a long-time member of Murdoch University's parasitology group and has co-authored reviews on parasite zoonoses and wildlife.

He has served on the editorial board of the International Journal for Parasitology: Parasites and Wildlife.
