= Toongabbie Government Farm Archaeological Site =

- Location within New South Wales Location within Australia
- 33.7809°S 150.9714°E
- Location: Goliath Avenue, Winston Hills, City of Parramatta, New South Wales, Australia

History
- Built: 1791–1813

Site notes
- Architect: Governor Phillip
- Owner: Blacktown City Council; Department of Trade & Investment-Crown Lands; Parramatta City Council

New South Wales Heritage Register
- Official name: Toongabbie Government Farm Archaeological Site; Palestine Park; Oakes Reserve; Settlers Walk; Toongabbie Government Farm Convict Site; Toongab-be; Toongabbee; Tongabby; Tongabbie
- Type: state heritage (archaeological-terrestrial)
- Designated: 11 December 2012
- Reference no.: 1903
- Type: Farm
- Category: Farming and Grazing
- Builders: Convicts

The Toongabbie Government Farm Archaeological Site is the heritage-listed site of a former convict government farm at Goliath Avenue, Winston Hills, City of Parramatta, New South Wales, Australia. The farm was built by convict labour from 1791 to 1813. Its site includes areas today known as Palestine Park, Oakes Reserve and Settlers Walk and is also known as the Toongabbie Government Farm Convict Site. It was added to the New South Wales State Heritage Register on 11 December 2012.

== History ==
=== Indigenous occupation ===
A number of clans or families, known generally as the Darug people, settled along the Parramatta River and its headwaters. At the head of the river were the Burramattagal (or Barramattagal) of the Parramatta district, while to their west and north lived the Bidjigal who were known in both the Castle Hill and Botany areas. Pemulwuy, the Aboriginal warrior and his son Tedbury were of the Bidjigal clan.

The Darug people lived on a diversity of plant and animal life. Fresh water streams yielded mullet, crayfish, shellfish and turtles. Male food-gathering activities ranged from trapping and hunting native animals to collecting bull ants and their eggs and larvae of the longicorn beetle (the witchetty grub). Lizards, snakes, birds, potoroos, wallabies and possum were hunted.

Toongabbie Creek was situated in an alluvial valley running eastwards from Prospect to the sea that was dominated by stands of tall timber with gullies providing humid and fire-free conditions. These developed the closed canopies that supported patches of local rainforest or "brush" in the rich soil, some of which still remain along the creek between Oakes Road and Briens Road. The turpentine (Syncarpia glomulifera) and the coachwood or scented satinwood (Ceratopetalum apetalum) were common, as were the lillypilly (Acmena smithii) and the water gum (Tristaniopsis laurina).

=== The spread of settlement around Rose Hill ===
Governor Phillip's 1787 instructions to "proceed to the cultivation of the land" immediately, using convict labour resulted in the early establishment of government farms. His settlement of Rose Hill (later Parramatta) in November 1788 was driven by the need to develop an agricultural community that would make the colony almost self-sufficient. The government farm at Rose Hill thrived and paved the way for emancipist farming on land grants and the expansion of settlement around the township of Rose Hill. With the arrival of the Second Fleet in June 1790, (and an increased convict workforce), Phillip decided to expand settlement to the north-west of Rose Hill, along the Parramatta River valley, where the fertile river and creek lands could be cleared for cultivation.

The first expansion was a new "public settlement" about 2.4 km to the north of Rose Hill on the south side of Toongabbie Creek, in the corner of land formed by the creek and the head of the Parramatta River. The site is now occupied by Westmead Children's Hospital and remnants of the Psychiatric Centre Farm. Collins referred to it as "the new grounds" in August 1791. Under the direction of Thomas Daveney, 500 convicts, housed in 13 large tent huts, cleared 134 acres (54 hectares) that was then sown for maize. Karskens notes Watkin Tench's comment that (unusually) their labour was "unassisted by any liquor but water".

=== Toongabbie: The second settlement, principal agricultural centre and government stockyard, 1791-1813 ===
In 1791 Governor Phillip appointed Thomas Daveney to select, plan and superintend a more extensive "second settlement" further up the Toongabbie Creek, about 4 km north-west of the New Grounds. Here 500 convicts, most of whom were newly arrived on the Third Fleet, cleared 300 acres of forest in 30 days in late 1791, burning off the timber and planting the first crop of turnips to prepare the ground for maize. A year later, in October 1792, Phillip could report that: "One thousand acres of ground are in cultivation on the public account at Parramatta and a new settlement formed about three miles to the westward of Parramatta, and to which I have given the name of Toon-gab-be, a name by which the natives distinguish the spot". Legend has it that this was the first colonial town to be given an Aboriginal name. However, Phillip named Parramatta in June 1791 (on the King's birthday) and Toongabbie a month later, in July.

Governor Phillip (perhaps with the assistance of his Surveyor General, Augustus Alt) laid out the town plan for Toongabbie in a similar fashion to his 1790 plan for Rose Hill with convicts housed on huts on allotments along a main street.

By December 1792, Toongabbie had fulfilled Phillip's intention of becoming the principal farm of the colony with over 696 acres (281.6 hectares) of wheat, barley and maize while Parramatta's cultivation had dwindled to 316 acres (127.8 hectares). Most of the government's stock of cattle, horses and sheep were kept at Toongabbie as well. The settlement came to be self-sufficient with a barber, shoemaker, tailor, thatcher, miller and eight constables as well as convict overseers.

Toongabbie was designed to accommodate a convict workforce of 700. But its convict population swelled to over a thousand, including 260 women, many boys and some "old and feeble men" who were hutkeepers. Convicts worked from 5 am till 10 am, rested til 2 pm then worked until sunset. Work included felling trees, piling them up for burning, digging out stumps and turning the ground with spades and hoes.

Convicts were employed in raising grain, maintaining the township infrastructure and in looking after the government stock of cattle, horses, sheep, goats, pigs and chickens. Convicts constructed a new stockyard in 1796 and a large shed for government cattle in 1797. When Governor King arrived in the colony in 1800 there were 262 cattle, 30 horses and 137 sheep at Toongabbie. These were useful for manuring the 120 hectares still under wheat and the 40 hectares ready for maize. By 1801, however, King had all stock except cattle removed from Toongabbie to Parramatta.

In 1792, Toongabbie became the first location for the secondary punishment of convicts. Those convicted of stealing maize at Parramatta would not only be flogged but also sent to Toongabbie, where the work under the superintendent, Thomas Daveney, was severe and the location remote. The concept was extended in 1794 when "bad and suspicious characters" were sent to Toongabbie and were put to work in chains.

Superintendent Daveney was a hard taskmaster and drove his convicts relentlessly through his overseers, "a set of merciless wretches" often chosen from the toughest and most brutal convicts. Newly arrived male convicts were sent direct to Toongabbie. Those capable of handling a spade or hoe were set to work despite their emaciated condition after the long voyage. Hard labour combined with meagre rations led to many deaths at Toongabbie. Irish convict numbers increased rapidly after the Irish Rebellion of 1798 and the defeat of rebel (or patriot) forces at the Battle of Vinegar Hill. Most of the Irish transported between 1797 and 1801 were sent to Toongabbie where they were regarded as a disruptive element, threatening to desert at harvest time. Several planned Irish uprisings were foiled at Toongabbie. Their ringleaders were flogged and dispersed to the remote penal stations of Norfolk Island and the Hunter River coal mines. After 1801, Irish convicts were removed to the new (third) government farm being established at Castle Hill.

Karskens notes the brutality and oppression that later came to be associated with Toongabbie (perhaps undeservedly). Like other government farms it was not established as a place of punishment (as were the later penal stations of Newcastle, Port Macquarie and Cockatoo Island). But it nevertheless came to be associated with tyranny, torture and oppression - for which, however, there is little evidence. Toongabbie later acquired international notoriety as a place synonymous with slavery and famine and was included in the tracts of the anti-transportation and anti-slavery campaigners. It lived on in Irish folk memory as an original site of Irish oppression in Australia. 80 years after its closure, Ned Kelly, in his Jerilderie letter, "placed Toongabbie in the larger story of worldwide Irish suffering at the hands of the English".

Toongabbie is also associated with a severe escalation of hostilities on the Cumberland Plain between the local Aboriginal people and the convicts and civil authorities. Earlier torchings of settler farm buildings and crops in the Prospect and Toongabbie areas escalated in 1792 to Aboriginal "maize raids" on the Toongabbie Government Farm at harvest time. The frequency of these raids led to armed watchmen and soldiers being posted to guard the farm from 1794. Karskens reads these attacks on property as an Aboriginal response to dispossession and speculates that the 1794 "battle of Toongabbie" that secured the trophy head of an Aboriginal man was a non-military reprisal party raid on a sleeping Aboriginal camp that likely also included child-taking.

In March 1797 the Aboriginal warrior Pemulwuy, of the Bidjigal clan, led a raid on Toongabbie Government Farm, followed by a series of robberies of the Northern Farms (around present day North Parramatta). Soon after this raid Pemulwuy was injured in the "Battle of Parramatta" where around 100 hostile Aborigines clashed with vigilante groups of armed settlers and soldiers. In the altercation Pemulwuy was shot but recovered and escaped in irons from Parramatta hospital. From 1797 to 1802 Pemulwuy was a powerful Aboriginal resistance leader against British settlement. He led raids on farms around Lane Cove, Bankstown, Georges River, Parramatta and Prospect, attacking, burning and plundering huts, crops, and livestock. Following his capture and death as an outlaw in 1802, his head was taken to the Hunterian Museum of the Royal College of Surgeons in London (from where it subsequently disappeared).

Toongabbie's decline was as rapid as its rise. Following Governor Phillip's departure in December 1792, Lieutenant Governor Grose adopted a different agricultural policy. Grose discontinued centralised government farming, granted land to military and civil officers, officials and settlers, allotted the majority of the convict workforce to them, and encouraged them to raise cereal crops, to be purchased by the Commissariat Store. Toongabbie's lands soon showed signs of exhaustion from repeated cereal cropping which gave Grose the opportunity to alienate land and reassign the convict work force.

In 1793 Grose appointed John Macarthur as Inspector of Public Works at Toongabbie as well as Parramatta. Working under Macarthur (who resigned in 1796 and was succeeded by Richard Atkins) and the Government Farm superintendent Thomas Daveney (discharged in 1795) and Andrew Hume (superintendent of convicts) was Richard Fitzgerald, a very able ex-convict who took responsibility for close supervision of convict performance from 1792 onwards. In 1798 Fitzgerald was superintending agriculture at both Toongabbie and Parramatta.

Colonial government policy for agricultural production in the first decades of European settlement see-sawed between favouring government farms and private enterprise. In September 1795 Governor Hunter arrived in the colony with orders to re-establish public farming. As this involved withdrawing convict labour from settlers, it was a highly unpopular policy with both settlers and convicts. In December 1797 a large 90 feet (27.4 metres) long threshing barn was completed at Toongabbie which enabled eight or nine threshers to work concurrently. A large number of cattle were also placed at the farm to manure the soil for cropping.

In August 1801, however, Governor King advised the government that he had 50 men clearing land for a new Government Farm at Castle Hill to replace Toongabbie whose lands had been worked out by repeated cereal cropping. In 1803 official policy under Governor King saw public farming once again wound back in favour of private enterprise. While Toongabbie Government Farm closed for crop cultivation in 1803, government stock remained on the site until 1807. When Governor Bligh rebuilt the dairy and barn in 1807 there were still 873 cattle at Toongabbie (and no other stock). Numbers were soon reduced but there were still 128 cattle, 3 horses and 189 sheep at Toongabbie in August 1808 (out of a mainland-wide total of 3351 cattle, 44 horses and 858 sheep). Governor Macquarie, arriving in 1810, reappraised the whole system of government farms in the colony.

Macquarie closed down most convict-run public agriculture but retained a government interest in owning substantial numbers of cattle and sheep in new stock-yards to be built at locations removed from towns and settlers. Stock was removed from Toongabbie in 1813 and in 1817 Macquarie confirmed that Toongabbie was permanently closed.

=== Post Government Farm and stockyard site history ===
Macquarie retained his interest in Toongabbie, however, requesting the now disused site (but no convict labour or livestock) as a land grant on his resignation "on account of the beauty of the Situation and the contiguity to the seat of Government, it being only 17 miles west of Sydney". The grant was not approved and the 700 hectares at Toongabbie, including the old village site, remained officially unoccupied either by government or lessees in 1825.

It remained part of the Parramatta Domain until an act of the Parliament of New South Wales in 1857 made sub-division and sale possible. Survey and subdivision in 1860-61 created allotments of 8.4 to 16 hectares around Toongabbie Creek. 240 hectares, comprising the entire site of the former Government Farm and much of its adjacent farm lands, were purchased by a single proprietor, George Oakes, in 1861 and used for grazing.

At some point prior to 1860 quarrying, presumably for stone, took place on the north bank of Toongabbie Creek and on the south side of the creek near the present substation.

George Oakes was a significant figure in local and state affairs who sat in the New South Wales Parliament from 1848 off and on until his death in 1881, mostly in the Legislative Council. Oakes' principal home was "Rose Cottage" (now Perth House built 1840s) in George Street, Parramatta. The site of "Casuarina" (Oakes' substantial 1861 stone house, now demolished) is outside the SHR curtilage for Toongabbie Government Farm, at the north-west corner of the present Oakes Road and Barnetts Road. Oakes ran horses and cattle on his Toongabbie lands and grew fruit and vegetables. He constructed a stone weir across Toongabbie Creek (at the site of the present concrete dam) to create a private swimming pool for his family. Oakes is probably also responsible for the upper stone steps that lead to the four shallow steps cut in the bedrock beside the creek.

Oakes estate was subdivided after his death in 1881. The site of the former convict settlement was leased by a number of Chinese market gardeners from at least 1887. Harold Barnett, who grew up nearby, assisted in old age in drawing a map showing land use as he remembered it in 1890. Barnett claimed that as many as 50 Chinese men worked co-operatively on the gardens. Several Chinese market gardeners have been identified, mainly belonging to three families who worshipped together at St John's Anglican Church in Parramatta.

Subsequent subdivision from the 1880s resulted in orcharding, closer settlement and new streets in the vicinity of the site. Since the land immediately adjacent to Toongabbie Creek was liable to recurrent flood, it was not developed and reverted to public use from the 1920s onwards as a series of reserves. In the 1960s and 1970s the former Government Farm lands adjacent to Toongabbie Creek came under local council control, initially Blacktown Council and later Parramatta City Council after 1972. Land north of Toongabbie Creek became Palestine Park which was named in conjunction with the streets of the adjacent subdivision (Goliath, Gideon, Rebecca, Reuben, Ruth, Esther and Enoch). The former market gardens on the south side of the Creek became Oakes Reserve. Both parks are used for passive public recreation.

Twentieth century development of the site saw the major portion of the settlement of the former Government Farm (covering most of the convict huts and allotments) acquired in 1973 by Baxter Australia (later Baxter Healthcare) and substantially developed for works of a pharmaceutical company. The western end of the convict farm site was acquired for construction of a substantial electricity transmission substation, now owned by Endeavour Energy. With the exception of a portion of Endeavour Energy's landholding at Lot 1 DP780050 (being the riparian corridor adjacent to the creek) none of these developed landholdings are included in the proposed SHR curtilage.

== Description ==
=== Toongabbie government farm layout ===
The 1792 plan of "The Town of Toongabby" shows an ordered village settlement located on a bend of the Toongabbie Creek where its course turns from west–east to north–south. The main street of the convict settlement runs west–east, parallel to the creek, with two cross streets running north–south. The eastern cross street leads to a bridge which crosses the creek to its northern bank. The superintendent's and overseers huts, the military and the stores were located across the creek on the northern bank.

The main street is lined on both sides with 35 convict huts on allotments measuring 330 by 100 feet (101 by 30 m). The allotments are of a similar size to those at Rose Hill. The huts measure 30 by 15 feet (9.1 by 4.6 m) and would have accommodated 20 convicts (twice the number at Rose Hill). An early drawing (c. 1798), A western view of Toongabbee, depicts about 20 of these huts with a communal kitchen. The huts were of wattle and daub construction with gabled roofs of thatch and a brick chimney (although there is no mention of brick kilns or brickmaking at the settlement).

A stockyard was established in 1792 and a new stockyard constructed in 1796. In 1797 a large shed was built for cattle and a large weatherboard and shingle roofed threshing barn, 90 ft (27.4m) long, was completed. The site included an oven for the public baker and a hand-operated mill for preparing flour. There was also a dairy and church at the settlement. It is not known, however, where these buildings were sited so the location of their potential archaeology in unknown. It has been conjectured that the larger building in the north-east corner of the site was overseers' quarters. This view is supported by ceramic shard finds dating from the 1790s to the 1800s. It has also been conjectured that a lumberyard (referenced in 1799 land surveys) was established at the western end of the main street.

The 1792 plan of Toongabbie shows, at the north-east end of the laid-out section, a square, open-sided structure with a high thatched roof supported by four vertical round posts, containing what appears to be a large boiler or copper, with a high brick chimney from which smoke is curling. Sited close to the creek for water, it may be a communal laundry.

The 1798 view of the settlement terracing of the slope descending to the west bank of Toongabbie Creek below the huts. On the south side on the extension of the "street" there was a high two-rail wooden fence, running down to the Creek bank. The terracing and the fence may possibly have been constructed for the grape-vines which had been planted late in 1792 but which seem not to have endured. There was no granary at the time. The painting shows, on the northern side of the creek, the brick barn and grain-store built by convicts in February 1793 and destroyed by storms in August 1795.

The Old Windsor Road, from Parramatta to the Hawkesbury, bisected the Government Farm lands to the south of the settlement.

=== Present day site ===
There are no above-ground remains of the structures of the Toongabbie Convict Government Farm.

There are seven sandstone steps cut into the bedrock of the creek at the north end of its north–south reach, on the eastern side of the creek. The four lowest steps are shallow with pecked surfaces that are consistent with convict work. Above the four steps are three very different and higher rock cut steps. The steps do not appear on the 1792 plan of "Toongabby", nor on the 1860 and 1861survey plans. There is no conclusive evidence that any of the steps date from the Government Farm period. It is likely that the three upper steps were constructed by George Oakes in the 1860s, in connection with his construction of a stone weir across the creek to create a private swimming pool for his nearby residence (located outside the SHR curtilage).

Oakes' stone weir is now the site of a small concrete dam across the midsection of the creek's north–south reach. Adjacent to the concrete structure there is a substantial amount of broken-up rock, which is likely to be the remnants of Oakes' stone weir. The dam continues to have the effect of deepening the water in the creek upstream.

Today the remnant site of the Government Farm is largely the parkland of Palestine Park and Oakes Reserve which spans a bend in the Toongabbie Creek between Goliath Avenue and Oakes Road. A small section of the site immediately south of the creek and opposite Palestine Park is land owned by the electricity transmission substation.

The land slopes fairly sharply down to the creek on both sides and the lower parts have always been subject to flooding. The water in the creek is quite deep adjacent to the site. Most of the north bank within Palestine Park is steep and rocky, especially at the east end.

Most of the curtilage south and west of Toongabbie Creek has remained cleared for two centuries and comprises Oakes Reserve (also known as Settlers Walk) which is covered with regularly mown grass.

On the northern side of the creek, in Palestine Park, there is a highly modified remnant of Cumberland Plain Woodland (a Critically Endangered Ecological Community) interrupted by several clearings including one for a children's playground opposite the intersection of Goliath Avenue and Gideon Street.

The vegetation along the south bank of the creek has been less disturbed and consists of River Flat Eucalypt Forest, an Endangered Ecological Community.

The only signage relating directly to the convict farm is on the east bank of the creek close to the rock steps, erected by Parramatta City Council. It is located at the place where Thomas Watling (or some other artist) painted the "Western View of Toongabbie" published as an engraving in 1798 which is reproduced on the sign.

=== Archaeological potential ===
There are no visible remains of the convict buildings above ground. To the south of Toongabbie Creek, the general location of the buildings, the simple layout of the six blocks of huts and the cultivation terraces on the eastern slope down to the Creek shown in a plan of c.1792 and in an engraving published in 1798 can, however, be overlaid on a current cadastral map and on the 1943 aerial photograph. These overlays show where there are areas which may have high archaeological potential. The site within SHR curtilage has been only minimally disturbed by grazing and market gardening since the convict settlement closed in 1813.

On the north side of Toongabbie Creek, the southern sections of the convict granary complex (built in 1793, blown down in 1795 and replaced in 1797) and the superintendent's quarters lay within the present Palestine Park between the intersection of Goliath Avenue with Reuben and Esther Streets. This area has some archaeological potential.

The stone steps on the east bank of Toongabbie Creek at the extreme east of the site are in good condition. This area may have archaeological potential.

Without archaeological investigation, it is impossible to say whether those parts of the site which are in all probability relatively undisturbed retain sub-surface integrity, but the physical context of the farm in relation to Toongabbie Creek and to the eighteenth-century Old Windsor Road is still recognisable and meaningful.

== Heritage listing ==
The Toongabbie Government Farm Archaeological Site is of State heritage significance for its capacity to demonstrate strategies developed during the foundation years of the colonial settlement by Governor Phillip to best use convict workers outside an urban area. Governor Phillip's policies towards ordinary transportees and, later, the small minority who reoffended, are highly significant for the development of the colony under his immediate successors. The Toongabbie site has an essential role in understanding and interpreting the physical dimensions of these solutions. Toongabbie was a vitally important stage in the evolution of new settlements such as Newcastle and Port Macquarie exclusively designed as places of secondary punishment. Because of its critical role in feeding the struggling early colony by its production of wheat, maize and barley, the historical significance of Toongabbie Government Farm in the years 1791 to 1794 is especially high.

The site is closely associated with the major early colonial Governors Phillip, Hunter, King and Macquarie and Lieutenant Governor Grose and with the superintendent of convict agriculture, Thomas Daveney. The history of Toongabbie Government Farm reflects the shifts and accommodations in early colonial government policy between support for government farms and support for private enterprise agriculture in the first two decades of colonial settlement.

As the second successful government farm in the colony Toongabbie is one of only two such sites in Australia. The other is the first (successful) government farm at Rose Hill (Parramatta Park). Both sites demonstrate Governor Phillip's town planning that was informed by English village settlement. Phillip housed the convicts of both establishments communally in huts on designated allotments laid out on a street grid pattern. This concept was not continued at the Castle Hill (third) Government Farm where convicts were housed in stone barracks, which later came to be the pattern of convict accommodation.

Toongabbie Government Farm site is also closely associated with convict administrators John Macarthur, Richard Atkins, Andrew Hume and Richard Fitzgerald, and with George Oakes, politician, pastoralist and Commissioner of international exhibitions, who owned the site as part of his private estate from 1861 to 1881.

The Toongabbie Government Farm Archaeological Site is significant at the state level because of its early role in the convict system, its association with the development of policies concerning convicts, and its archaeological potential.

The use of an Aboriginal name for the settlement is highly significant at a state level. Parramatta and Toongabbie are the earliest recorded places to be deliberately given an indigenous name by the European administration. Both names were selected by Governor Phillip personally.

Toongabbie Government Farm Archaeological Site was listed on the New South Wales State Heritage Register on 11 December 2012 having satisfied the following criteria.

The place is important in demonstrating the course, or pattern, of cultural or natural history in New South Wales.

The Toongabbie Government Farm Archaeological Site has state historical significance as the earliest government farming enterprise outside the first two colonial administrative centres of Sydney and Parramatta. Toongabbie Government Farm represents an important phase in the early deployment of convict labour and the hierarchy of administration outside the two urban centres.

Toongabbie Government Farm was established in 1791 using convict labour because of severe problems in provisioning the new colony. Government farms were an essential part of British Government strategy implemented by Governor Phillip and his immediate successors to provide sustenance for the colony. Toongabbie was a reasonably successful enterprise during the critical earliest years before the Upper Hawkesbury Valley was opened up in 1794. It survived for a decade, initially producing a significant proportion of the maize, wheat and barley which was essential for the entire colony.

Toongabbie Government Farm played a significant role in educating unskilled convicts in farming techniques to ensure they could obtain employment, or work their own farms, when they completed their sentences. It therefore contributed to both the economic and social development of the colony. Two of the most successful ex-convicts from Toongabbie were Andrew Thompson, who became a constable, and Richard Fitzgerald who became a superintendent.

Toongabbie Farm is also state significant as the first attempt in the colony of NSW at creating a system for secondary punishment, to deal with those transportees who re-offended in the colony. It fulfilled this additional objective in the early 1790s and was the template on which the penal stations of Newcastle, Port Macquarie and Brisbane were later developed as mainland places of convict secondary punishment (in addition to the penal stations in Tasmania and on Norfolk Island).

The place has a strong or special association with a person, or group of persons, of importance of cultural or natural history of New South Wales's history.

The Toongabbie Government Farm Archaeological Site has strong associations with persons of state significance, being all five of the earliest colonial Governors, and the Lieutenant-Governor, from 1791 to 1821, and with the legendary Aboriginal warrior Pemulwuy of the Bidjigal clan.

Toongabbie Government Farm is strongly associated with the earliest colonial governors. Governor Phillip, who had been charged with the foundation of the colony and providing the material means for its survival in the critical early years after 1788, planned and created the new convict farm in 1791. Lieutenant-Governor Grose wound back public farming at Toongabbie and first alienated its lands. Governor Hunter restored public farming at Toongabbie, had the large threshing barn erected, and introduced stock to the farm to manure the soil and restore something of its fertility. Governor King closed the farm to crop cultivation but kept it going as a stock farm. Governor Bligh rebuilt farm buildings and continued the stock farm. Governor Macquarie formally closed down Toongabbie Government Farm, but also retained his interest in the site as a potential (though unsuccessful) land grant on his retirement as governor.

Toongabbie Government Farm is associated with Pemulwuy of the Bidjigal clan, the legendary Aboriginal warrior and resistance leader, who raided the farm in 1797 in one of his early attacks on convict and settler farms of the Parramatta and Georges River districts.

It is strongly associated with the first convict superintendent at Toongabbie, Thomas Daveney, who ran a harsh convict establishment at Toongabbie from 1791 to 1795.

The administration of the farm in the later 1790s was entrusted to men of wide importance in the development of the colony, such as Richard Fitzgerald and John Macarthur.

The first private owner of the site, George Oakes from 1861 to 1881, is a person of considerable local significance as a parliamentarian, pastoralist, businessman and Commissioner at three international exhibitions.

The place has strong or special association with a particular community or cultural group in New South Wales for social, cultural or spiritual reasons.

The Toongabbie Government Farm Archaeological Site has some social value for past nineteenth century communities: for the Irish in Australia as a site of oppression by British rule and for anti-transportation and anti-slavery activists as a site of tyranny and oppression.

The place has potential to yield information that will contribute to an understanding of the cultural or natural history of New South Wales.

The Toongabbie Government Farm Archaeological Site has state research significance as the earliest convict station which offers substantial archaeological opportunities to give physical documentation to the lives of those convicts who came on the Third Fleet and other early transports, and were still working out their sentences in the mid-1790s.

The parkland section of the site has been subject only to a brief surface archaeological survey which indicates that there is high potential for an archaeological resource in the existing parkland area as much of the site was infilled and levelled before landscaping.

While the extent of disturbance of the archaeological resource has not yet been assessed, identified areas of archaeological sensitivity were backfilled in the 1960s before landscaping, street layout and house building to create more level sites. This is considered likely to have preserved the archaeological resource.

The northern section of the site, across from the north bank of the Toongabbie Creek, has not been archaeologically surveyed but the preliminary archaeology assessment concluded there is archaeological potential for the remains of the Government Farm buildings and structures that occupied this area.

The 1998 assessment identified ceramic surface finds located in the north-east section of the site that have been dated from the 1790s to the early 1800s. These finds represent a minimum of 17 whole items (platters, plates and bowls) that are likely to have belonged to a convict overseer.

The site is likely to provide evidence of the survival of post holes, privy pits, rubbish pits and wells.

The site has state significance for its research potential for pre-contact and post-contact Aboriginal occupation and shared history.

The place possesses uncommon, rare or endangered aspects of the cultural or natural history of New South Wales.

The Toongabbie Government Farm Archaeological Site has rarity value at state level because, other than Rose Hill at Parramatta, there is no other comparable era site which expresses the early policy towards convicts implemented by Government and which retains potential for archaeological investigation.

The place is important in demonstrating the principal characteristics of a class of cultural or natural places/environments in New South Wales.

The Toongabbie Government Farm Archaeological Site has state significance at a representative level because the site is capable of demonstrating the earliest phases of colonial strategies for establishing an effective convict work-place and punishment centre outside an urban area. It also meets this criterion by providing the skills and practical experience for ex-convicts to become productive citizens of New South Wales.
