= Andrew Thomson (Australian footballer) =

Australian rules footballer

Personal information
- Born: 30 December 1972 (age 53); Kyneton Vic
- Original team: Echuca (GVFL)
- Height: 173 cm (5 ft 8 in)
- Weight: 80 kg (176 lb)

Playing career^{1}
Years	Club	Games (Goals)
1991-1993	Sydney Swans	3 (1)
- ^{1} Playing statistics correct to the end of 1993.

Career highlights
- 1992 NSW State of Origin V Queensland 2 Goals. Sydney Swans Reserves Best and Fairest 1992

Andrew Thomson (born 30 December 1972) is a former Australian rules footballer who played with the Sydney Swans in the Australian Football League (AFL).

Thomson was a rover, recruited to Sydney from Goulburn Valley Football League club Echuca. He made two senior appearances in the 1993 AFL season, against the Brisbane Bears in round eight and Geelong in round nine. He was the Sydney Swans Reserves Best and Fairest in 1992
