= Andy Thomson (sea captain) =

American-born trading schooner captain

Andrew Thomson (21 January 1887 - 17 October 1975), was an American-born Cook Islands trading schooner master associated with the inter-island vessels Tagua, Tiare Taporo and Charlotte Donald. He spent most of his maritime career in the Cook Islands trade and was described by Pacific Islands Monthly in 1962 as one of the last old-time South Pacific schooner masters.

== Early life ==
Thomson was born in Brooklyn, New York, on 21 January 1887, and grew up on Long Island near the port of New York. He served his apprenticeship in Atlantic square-rigged ships, worked as a quartermaster on the Great Lakes, and made voyages from Seattle and San Francisco, including to Alaska, before settling in the South Pacific.

According to later Pacific Islands Monthly profiles, Thomson first saw Rarotonga from a Boston barque when he was about 15 and had established a six-acre holding on the island by the age of 19. He married a Rarotongan woman.

== Maritime career ==
Thomson worked for A. B. Donald Ltd for much of his career and was master of the company's trading schooner Tagua before the Second World War. Robert Dean Frisbie's 1930 Atlantic Monthly account of the schooner Tagua places Thomson aboard the vessel at Avarua in December 1928, preparing to sail to San Francisco for replacement masts. The same voyage continued from Penrhyn toward San Francisco in February 1929 and reached the Golden Gate in April 1929.

In February 1931, while in command of Tagua, Thomson brought the vessel through a severe hurricane near Aitutaki and reached Tahiti for repairs. Pacific Islands Monthly reported in 1932 that Tagua and Thomson had attracted wider attention because of Frisbie's writing.

Thomson took command of A. B. Donald's auxiliary diesel schooner Tiare Taporo in 1939. In 1942 he was credited with bringing mosquito-fish from Tahiti for Cook Islands waters and with moving itiki eels from Mitiaro to Rarotonga and Mangaia as a food-resource initiative.

During the war years Tiare Taporo served as an important link between isolated Cook Islands communities, according to Pacific Islands Monthly. In February 1948, with Thomson in command, Tiare Taporo survived five days in a hurricane near Fiji; the magazine reported that Thomson remained at the wheel for more than four days and nights with only brief rests.

After Tiare Taporo moved into the Society Islands trade in 1949, Thomson became master of A. B. Donald's motor vessel Charlotte Donald. A 1951 profile reported that three of Thomson's sons had sailed with him in recent years, and a 1954 notice identified Tony Thomson as Captain Andy's eldest son and a mariner seeking his master's ticket in Wellington.

Tiare Taporo returned to the Cook Islands service in April 1960, and Thomson again became her master. In early October 1962, at the age of 75, he completed what Pacific Islands Monthly described as his last voyage, bringing Tiare Taporo from Rarotonga to Auckland for refit before she returned under Captain A. J. Pickering. A 1965 photograph feature listed Thomson among Rarotonga senior citizens and credited him with 56 years' residence in the Cook Islands.

== Reputation and associations ==
Thomson was repeatedly profiled as a colourful and experienced South Pacific skipper. In a 1976 obituary, Pacific Islands Monthly stated that his friends included South Seas writers Charles Nordhoff, James Norman Hall and Robert Dean Frisbie. A 1968 review note reported that Captain Clough Blair was writing a book about Thomson's South Pacific experiences.

Pacific Islands Monthly also credited Thomson with an unusually strong safety record, reporting statements that he had not lost a ship or a man overboard during his career with A. B. Donald. The same accounts linked that reputation to Thomson's practice of turning back to recover anyone who fell overboard.

== Death ==
Thomson died at his home on Rarotonga on 17 October 1975, aged 88 years and nine months. He was buried that evening in the grounds of his home at Rutaki, where an estimated 200 to 300 mourners attended his funeral. He was survived by his wife, a daughter and four sons, including Tony Thomson, who was described as a master mariner.

== Legacy and present-day commemorations in the Cook Islands ==
Captain Andy's Beach Bar & Grill, at The Rarotongan Beach Resort & Lagoonarium on Aroa Beach, is named after Thomson and is listed by Cook Islands Tourism as a current dining venue. The Rarotongan describes the venue as overlooking the Aroa Lagoonarium Marine Sanctuary and states that it was named for Thomson.

Villa Lime Blossom, a three-bedroom private pool and spa villa across the Circle Island Road from The Rarotongan, incorporates Thomson's original coral-and-limestone heritage home. The villa's name refers to Tiare Taporo, which the resort translates as "Lime Blossom", and the resort states that Thomson hosted Robert Dean Frisbie and Tom Neale on the house's verandah. Cook Islands Tourism also lists the historic house as still standing and says it has been transformed into SpaPolynesia LUXE @ Lime Blossom Villa.

Thomson's grave at Rutaki is documented in his 1976 obituary, which reported his burial in the grounds of his home. A later A. B. Donald commemorative page states that Edwin "Ned" Dav.
