= Model Farms High School =

Location
- Baulkham Hills, New South Wales; Australia; 33°46′10″S 150°58′17″E

Information
- Type: Public
- Motto: Great Deeds
- Established: 1975; 51 years ago
- Principal: Megan Clarke
- Enrolment: ~1000 (7–12)
- Campus: Urban
- Colours: Blue and gold
- Website: modelfarms-h.schools.nsw.gov.au

Model Farms High School is a public high school in Baulkham Hills, a suburb in northwest Sydney, New South Wales, Australia. The school is named so because the area was set up to demonstrate farming practices to convicts and others who wished to start a farm when the first settlers arrived. The school was built and established in 1975.

== Houses ==
A new school house system was introduced in 2007, with some major changes to the old system. It includes receiving house points for merits and awards, as well as sporting events like the annual swimming carnival. The houses consist of Chisholm (green), Peel (blue), Thompson (red), and Wentworth (yellow).

== 2020 bomb threat ==
At about 10:30AM on 28 August 2020, police were called to Model Farms High School. The NSW bomb squad, ambulance and fire crews were on the scene until about 1:30PM the same day.

== Notable people ==
- Daniel Mookhey – NSW Treasurer, 2023–present
- John Tsigounis – First Australian-born Greek Orthodox Bishop, 2011–present

== See also ==
- List of Government schools in New South Wales
